= Lake Michigan Conference =

High school athletic conference

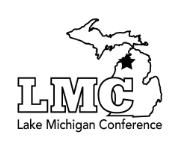
- Conference: MHSAA
- Founded: 1997
- Commissioner: Aaron Biggar
- Sports fielded: 19; men's: 9; women's: 9
- No. of teams: 8
- Headquarters: East Jordan, Michigan
- Region: Northern Michigan

Locations
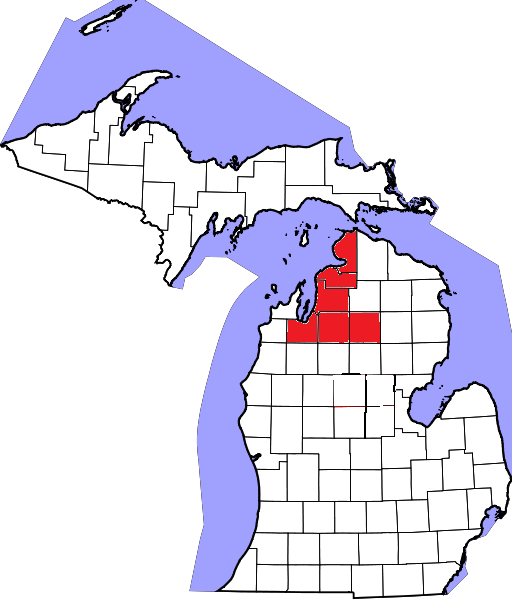

The Lake Michigan Conference was an interscholastic athletic conference affiliated with the Michigan High School Athletic Association. It was located in Northern Michigan and contained eight teams that encompasses six counties: Antrim County, Charlevoix County, Crawford County, Emmet County, Grand Traverse County, and Kalkaska County.

== History ==
The Lake Michigan Conference traces it origins to the Great Northern Conference, which began play in 1990. The conference was split into four divisions, by geography and school size. The Lake Michigan Division consisted of Class C schools; East Jordan, Boyne City, Charlevoix, Elk Rapids, Kalkaska, Mancelona, Traverse City St. Francis and Harbor Springs. Kalkaska played in the Lake Huron Division for football only with: Lincoln-Alcona, Grayling, Whittemore-Prescott, Onaway and Rogers City.

In 1993, Mancelona dropped to the smaller Ski-Valley for all sports. The Great Northern Conference dissolved in 1997, with most of the divisions retaining all their league memberships. The Lake Michigan Division, re-branded as the Lake Michigan Conference, with Kalkaska joining for football. The membership stayed the same until 2003, when Grayling, a former Lake Huron Division Rival of Kalkaska, left the Northeast Michigan Conference. This gave the conference the 8 teams that it has today. In 2010, conference athletic directors voted to eliminate St. Francis from participating in football effective in 2012. Elk Rapids and Grayling agreed to continue their series, while St. Francis will play two other LMC teams on a three-year rotation. The LMC also extended an invitation to St. Ignace High School to join. On January 14, 2011, it was announced that St. Ignace would join the Ski-Valley Conference.

Following the 2013 season the LMC and the neighboring Northwest Conference merged for football only, creating the Northern Michigan Football League. The league was split into two divisions based on enrollment and competitiveness. The Leader division consisted of the larger and more accomplished programs including, St. Francis, Maple City-Glen Lake, Elk Rapids, Boyne City, Kingsley, Benzie Central and Grayling. The Legacy Division consisted of Frankfort, Charlevoix, Kalkaska, East Jordan, Suttons Bay and Harbor Springs. Mesick, an original member of the Northwest Conference, opted against joining the NMFL and instead joined the five schools of the Mid-State North Conference, creating the Northwestern Six Football League.

In 2023, amidst discussion of removing St. Francis from the conference for competitive balancing purposes, or Kalkaska possibly leaving the conference, East Jordan announced it would be joining the Ski-Valley Conference, citing its low enrollment being better suited amongst the smaller schools of the Ski-Valley. In April 2023 the Northern Shores Conference was announced, with Boyne City, Charlevoix, Elk Rapids, Grayling, Harbor Springs, and Kalkaska leaving the Lake Michigan Conference to form this new league with Cheboygan from the Straits Area Conference and Kingsley from the Northwest Conference.

== Members ==
Full member institutions include: Departing Members are highlighted in pink.

Team & Mascot	School	Location	Joined	Enrollment	Class	Boys Champ	Girls Champ	Total Champ
Boyne City Ramblers	Boyne City High School	Boyne City, Michigan	1997	424	B	11	12	23
Charlevoix Rayders	Charlevoix High School	Charlevoix, Michigan	1997	282	C	46	34	80
East Jordan Red Devils	East Jordan High School	East Jordan, Michigan	1997	226	C	13	8	21
Elk Rapids Elks	Elk Rapids High School	Elk Rapids, Michigan	1997	369	B	42	25	67
Grayling Vikings	Grayling High School	Grayling, Michigan	2003	432	B	17	0	17
Harbor Springs Rams	Harbor Springs High School	Harbor Springs, Michigan	1997	246	C	41	58	99
Kalkaska Blazers	Kalkaska High School	Kalkaska, Michigan	1997	432	B	11	15	26
St. Francis Gladiators	St. Francis High School	Traverse City, Michigan	1997	356	C	76	77	154

=== Former members ===
Team & Mascot	High School	Location	Joined	Departed	Successive Conference
Boyne City Ramblers	Boyne City High School	Boyne City, Michigan	1997	2024	Northern Shores Conference
Charlevoix Rayders	Charlevoix High School	Charlevoix, Michigan	1997	2024	Northern Shores Conference
Elk Rapids Elks	Elk Rapids High School	Elk Rapids, Michigan	1997	2024	Northern Shores Conference
Grayling Vikings	Grayling High School	Grayling, Michigan	2003	2024	Northern Shores Conference
Harbor Springs Rams	Harbor Springs High School	Harbor Springs, Michigan	1997	2024	Northern Shores Conference
Kalkaska Blazers	Kalkaska High School	Kalkaska, Michigan	1997	2024	Northern Shores Conference
Mancelona Ironmen	Mancelona High School	Mancelona, Michigan	1990	1993	Ski-Valley Conference
East Jordan Red Devils	East Jordan High School	East Jordan, Michigan	1997	2024	Ski-Valley Conference

=== Membership timeline ===
Lake Michigan stopped sponsoring football in 2014.

== Football ==
Conference champions

Year	Champion	Record
1997	St. Francis	11-1 (6–0)
1998	St. Francis	11-2 (6–0)
1999	St. Francis	13-1 (6–0)*
2000	Charlevoix	6-4 (5–1)
2001	Boyne City	12-1 (6–0)
2002	St. Francis	10-2 (6–0)
2003	St. Francis	14-0 (7–0)*
2004	St. Francis	8-2 (7–0)
2005	St. Francis	13-1 (7–0)*
2006	St. Francis	10-2 (7–0)
2007	St. Francis	12-2 (7–0)
2008	St. Francis	13-1 (7–0)*
2009	St. Francis	14-0 (7–0)*
2010	Elk Rapids	9-1 (7–0)
2011	St. Francis	11-2 (7–0)
2012	Grayling	9-1 (6–0)
2013	Grayling	9-2 (6–0)

*State champion

=== Teams in the final regular-season rankings ===
Year	Team	Division	Rank
2023	Charlevoix	7	7th
2022	Boyne City	6	6th
2022	St. Francis	7	1st
2022	Charlevoix	7	9th
2021	Boyne City	6	6th
2021	Grayling	6	10th
2021	St. Francis	7	1st
2020	Charlevoix	7	6th
2018	St. Francis	6	2nd
2017	Boyne City	5	5th
2017	St. Francis	7	2nd
2016	St. Francis	7	1st
2015	Boyne City	6	7th
2014	Boyne City	6	5th
2012	Grayling	5	8th
2011	Grayling	5	8th
2011	St. Francis	8	4th
2010	Elk Rapids	5	2nd
2010	Grayling	5	10th
2010	St. Francis	7	7th
2009	St. Francis	7	1st
2008	St. Francis	7	6th
2007	St. Francis	7	4th
2006	St. Francis	7	5th
2005	Boyne City	6	6th
2005	St. Francis	7	5th
2004	St. Francis	7	3rd
2003	St. Francis	7	1st
2002	St. Francis	7	7th
2001	Boyne City	5	4th
1999	St. Francis	C	10th
1998	St. Francis	C	4th
1997	St. Francis	C	1st

=== Conference records ===
Team	LMC record	Pct.	NMFL record	NMFL%	Conference championship	State championships
St. Francis	94-5	.949	52-7	.881	12	5
Grayling	56-19	.747	27-32	.458	2	0
Boyne City	76-35	.685	44-13	.772	1	0
Charlevoix	53-58	.478	32-14	.696	1	0
Kalkaska	43-68	.387	12-37	.245	0	0
Elk Rapids	40-71	.360	19-34	.358	1	0
East Jordan	31-80	.279	20-31	.392	0	0
Harbor Springs	27-84	.243	25-26	.490	0	0

=== State championship results ===
Season	LMC		Non-LMC		Site	Division
1998	St. Francis (11–2)	8	Unionville-Sebawing (13–0)	23	Pontiac Silverdome • Pontiac, MI	C
1999	St. Francis (13–1)	23	Gobles (13–1)	6	Pontiac Silverdome • Pontiac, MI	7
2003	St. Francis (14–0)	28	Hudson (11–3)	13	Pontiac Silverdome • Pontiac, MI	7
2005	St. Francis (13–1)	28	Unionville-Sebawing (13–1)	14	Ford Field • Detroit, MI	7
2007	St. Francis (12–2)	0	Mendon (14–0)	20	Ford Field • Detroit, MI	7
2008	St. Francis (13–1)	42	Ubly (13–1)	8	Ford Field • Detroit, MI	7
2009	St. Francis (14–0)	42	Hudson (13–1)	7	Ford Field • Detroit, MI	7
2020	St. Francis (9–3)	35	New Lothrop (11–0)	42	Ford Field • Detroit, MI	7
2022	St. Francis (13–1)	12	Jackson Lumen Christi (11–3)	15	Ford Field • Detroit, MI	7

Results by team

Appearances	School	Wins	Losses	Pct.	Championship years
7	St. Francis	5	4	.556	1999, 2003, 2004, 2008, 2009

=== All-time playoff appearances ===
Traverse City St. Francis:(36) 1983, 85–87, 1990–2011, 2013–23

Boyne City:(22) 1993–94, 96, 2001–09, 2012–17, 2020–23

Grayling:(17) 1990, 92, 2003–05, 2007, 2009–13, 2015–17, 2020–22

Charlevoix:(13) 1992, 2000, 2005–06, 2008–09, 2014,16, 2019–23

Elk Rapids:(10) 2006–10, 2013–14, 2017–18, 2020, 2022

East Jordan:(9) 1993–94, 1999–2000, 2003, 2020–23

Harbor Springs: (8) 1986, 1999–2000, 2015–16, 2018–20

Kalkaska:(5) 2002, 2012–13, 2016, 2020

== Girls volleyball ==
Conference champions

Year	Champion	Record
1998	Charlevoix & Elk Rapids	10-2
1999	Elk Rapids	12-0
2000	Elk Rapids	11-1
2001	Elk Rapids	11-1
2002	Kalkaska	12-0
2003	Harbor Springs	12-0
2004	Charlevoix	13-1
2005	Charlevoix	13-1
2006	Kalkaska	13-1
2007 Feb.	Charlevoix	14-0
2007 Nov.	Charlevoix	14-0
2008	Charlevoix	13-1
2009	St. Francis	13-1
2010	Charlevoix	13-1
2011	Charlevoix	13-1
2012	St. Francis	14-0
2013	St. Francis	12-1
2014	St. Francis	14-0
2015	St. Francis	14-0
2016	St. Francis	14-0
2017	St. Francis	5-1
2018	St. Francis	11-1
2019	St. Francis	4-0
2020	Charlevoix	7-0
2021	Elk Rapids	7-0
2022	St. Francis	7-0
2023	St. Francis	7-0

Team	Conference championship	District championships	Regional championships
St. Francis	11	11	6
Charlevoix	9	12	1
Elk Rapids	5	3	0
Kalkaska	2	1	0
Harbor Springs	1	0	0
Boyne City	0	4	0
Grayling	0	2	0
East Jordan	0	0	0

=== State championship appearances ===
Season	LMC		Non-LMC		Site	Class/Div	Ref
2012	St. Francis (42–8–3)	14-26-10-9	Monroe St. Mary Catholic (49–6)	25-24-25-25	Kellogg Arena • Battle Creek, MI	C	
2023	St. Francis (38–10–1)	24-25-23-20	Kalamazoo Christian (43–6–3)	26-16-25-25	Kellogg Arena • Battle Creek, MI	3	

== Boys cross country ==
Conference champions

Year	Champion
1997	East Jordan
1998	East Jordan
1999	East Jordan
2000	East Jordan
2001	Charlevoix
2002	Harbor Springs
2003	Harbor Springs
2004	Harbor Springs
2005	Charlevoix
2006	Kalkaska
2007	Elk Rapids
2008	Harbor Springs
2009	Harbor Springs
2010	Harbor Springs
2011	Charlevoix
2012	Harbor Springs
2013	Charlevoix
2014	Harbor Springs
2015	Harbor Springs
2016	Harbor Springs
2017	Harbor Springs
2018	St. Francis
2019	Charlevoix
2020	St. Francis
2021	St. Francis
2022	St. Francis
2023	St. Francis

Team	Conference championships	Final appearances	State championships	Best finish
Harbor Springs	11	21	3	1st
East Jordan	4	8	2	1st
St. Francis	5	9	1	1st
Charlevoix	5	13	0	3rd
Kalkaska	1	4	0	4th
Elk Rapids	1	5	0	8th
Boyne City	0	1	0	20th
Grayling	0	0	0	-

=== State-final finishes ===
Year	School	Place	Division
1997	East Jordan	7th	C
1998	East Jordan	1st	C
1999	East Jordan	2nd	C
2000	Charlevoix	5th	3
2000	East Jordan	1st	4
2000	Harbor Springs	15th	4
2001	Charlevoix	3rd	3
2001	Elk Rapids	8th	3
2001	Harbor Springs	3rd	4
2001	East Jordan	11th	4
2002	Kalkaska	17th	3
2002	Harbor Springs	1st	4
2003	Kalkaska	23rd	3
2003	Harbor Springs	1st	4
2003	St. Francis	7th	4
2004	Harbor Springs	1st	3
2005	Kalkaska	6th	3
2006	Kalkaska	4th	3
2006	Elk Rapids	10th	3
2006	Harbor Springs	11th	4
2007	Elk Rapids	9th	3
2007	Harbor Springs	7th	4
2007	St. Francis	23rd	4
2008	Elk Rapids	11th	3
2008	Charlevoix	14th	3
2008	Harbor Springs	3rd	4
2008	St. Francis	19th	4
2009	Charlevoix	13th	3
2009	Harbor Springs	8th	4
2010	Harbor Springs	3rd	4
2011	Charlevoix	16th	3
2012	Harbor Springs	11th	4
2013	Charlevoix	12th	3
2014	Boyne City	20th	3
2014	Harbor Springs	8th	4
2015	Charlevoix	10th	3
2015	Harbor Springs	3rd	4
2016	Charlevoix	14th	3
2016	St. Francis	18th	3
2016	Harbor Springs	2nd	4
2017	Harbor Springs	5th	3
2017	Charlevoix	24th	3
2017	St. Francis	27th	3
2017	East Jordan	6th	4
2018	Charlevoix	10th	3
2018	Harbor Springs	13th	3
2018	St. Francis	22nd	3
2018	East Jordan	3rd	4
2019	Charlevoix	3rd	3
2019	St. Francis	4th	3
2019	Harbor Springs	8th	3
2019	East Jordan	3rd	4
2020	St. Francis	3rd	3
2020	Harbor Springs	20th	3
2020	Charlevoix	21st	3
2021	St. Francis	6th	3
2021	Charlevoix	12th	3
2021	Harbor Springs	15th	3
2022	St. Francis	2nd	3
2022	Elk Rapids	20th	3
2022	Harbor Springs	9th	4
2023	St. Francis	1st	3
2023	Charlevoix	15th	3
2023	Harbor Springs	8th	4

==== Individual state champions ====
Year	Champion	School	Division	Time
2004	Josh Hofbauer	Harbor Springs	3	15:48.1
2008	Tec Adams	Harbor Springs	4	15:22.4

== Girls cross country ==
Conference champions

Year	Champion
1997	Charlevoix
1998	Elk Rapids
1999	Boyne City
2000	East Jordan
2001	Boyne City
2002	Harbor Springs
2003	Elk Rapids
2004	Elk Rapids
2005	Elk Rapids
2006	Elk Rapids
2007	Harbor Springs
2008	Harbor Springs
2009	Harbor Springs
2010	Harbor Springs
2011	Charlevoix
2012	Harbor Springs
2013	Harbor Springs
2014	Harbor Springs
2015	St. Francis
2016	St. Francis
2017	St. Francis
2018	St. Francis
2019	St. Francis
2020	St. Francis
2021	St. Francis
2022	St. Francis
2023	St. Francis

Team	Conference championships	Final apps	State championships	Best finish
St. Francis	9	21	4	1st
Harbor Springs	8	21	2	1st
Elk Rapids	5	11	0	3rd
Charlevoix	2	13	0	6th
Boyne City	2	3	0	5th
East Jordan	1	7	0	4th
Kalkaska	0	0	0	-
Grayling	0	0	0	-

=== State-final finishes ===
Year	School	Place	Division
1998	Charlevoix	7th	C
1998	Elk Rapids	12th	C
2000	Boyne City	13th	3
2000	East Jordan	4th	4
2001	Boyne City	5th	3
2001	Elk Rapids	11th	3
2001	St. Francis	5th	4
2001	East Jordan	11th	4
2001	Harbor Springs	19th	4
2002	Charlevoix	12th	3
2002	Elk Rapids	14th	3
2002	St. Francis	3rd	4
2002	Harbor Springs	6th	4
2003	Elk Rapids	4th	3
2003	Charlevoix	11th	3
2003	Boyne City	22nd	3
2003	St. Francis	1st	4
2003	Harbor Springs	10th	4
2003	East Jordan	26th	4
2004	Elk Rapids	5th	3
2004	Charlevoix	9th	3
2004	Harbor Springs	12th	3
2004	St. Francis	6th	4
2005	Elk Rapids	4th	3
2005	East Jordan	5th	3
2005	St. Francis	2nd	4
2006	Elk Rapids	5th	3
2006	Harbor Springs	3rd	4
2006	St. Francis	15th	4
2007	Harbor Springs	2nd	4
2008	Elk Rapids	9th	3
2008	Harbor Springs	1st	4
2008	St. Francis	15th	4
2009	Harbor Springs	1st	4
2009	St. Francis	23rd	4
2010	Charlevoix	19th	3
2010	Harbor Springs	2nd	4
2010	St. Francis	12th	4
2011	Harbor Springs	5th	3
2011	Charlevoix	6th	3
2011	St. Francis	18th	4
2012	Harbor Springs	3rd	4
2012	St. Francis	7th	4
2013	St. Francis	8th	4
2014	Harbor Springs	4th	4
2015	St. Francis	1st	3
2015	Charlevoix	18th	3
2015	Harbor Springs	2nd	4
2015	East Jordan	27th	4
2016	St. Francis	1st	3
2016	Charlevoix	9th	3
2016	Harbor Springs	3rd	4
2017	Charlevoix	7th	3
2017	St. Francis	9th	3
2017	Harbor Springs	12th	3
2017	East Jordan	11th	4
2018	St. Francis	5th	3
2018	Harbor Springs	11th	3
2018	Charlevoix	12th	3
2018	East Jordan	9th	4
2019	St. Francis	4th	3
2019	Harbor Springs	12th	3
2019	Charlevoix	13th	3
2019	East Jordan	9th	4
2020	Charlevoix	11th	3
2020	St. Francis	13th	3
2020	Harbor Springs	18th	3
2021	St.Francis	3rd	3
2021	Harbor Springs	12th	3
2021	Elk Rapids	19th	3
2022	St. Francis	1st	3
2022	Elk Rapids	8th	3
2022	Charlevoix	22nd	3
2022	Harbor Springs	5th	4
2023	St. Francis	2nd	3
2023	Elk Rapids	3rd	3
2023	Harbor Springs	5th	4

==== Individual state champion ====
Year	Champion	School	Division	Time
2014	Holly Bullough	St. Francis	3	17:51.3
2015	Holly Bullough	St. Francis	3	17:41.8

== Boys soccer ==
Conference champions

Year	Champion	
2003-04	Elk Rapids	10-0
2004-05	Elk Rapids	10-0
2005-06	Elk Rapids	10-0
2006-07	Elk Rapids & Harbor Springs	10-2
2007-08	Boyne City	8-2-2
2008-09	Elk Rapids	12-0
2009-10	Charlevoix	9-1
2010-11	Elk Rapids & Charlevoix	9-1
2011-12	Elk Rapids	10-0
2012-13	Elk Rapids	9-1
2013-14	Elk Rapids	9-1
2014-15	Charlevoix & Elk Rapids	9-1
2015-16	Charlevoix	9-1
2016-17	Harbor Springs	10-0
2017-18	Elk Rapids	8-0-2
2018-19	Elk Rapids	10-0
2019-20	Elk Rapids	9-1
2020-21	Elk Rapids	9-0-1
2021-22	Elk Rapids	10-0
2022-23	Elk Rapids	9-1
2023-24	Elk Rapids	8-0-2

Team	Conference championship	District championships	Regional championships
Elk Rapids	17	16	10
Harbor Springs	2	9	2
Charlevoix	4	3	0
Boyne City	1	1	0
Kalkaska	0	0	0
East Jordan	0	0	0
Grayling	0	0	0
St. Francis*	0	7	3

- St. Francis has a Co-Op program with Traverse City Christian, who is the host program, and Grand Traverse Academy.

=== State championship appearances ===
Season	LMC		Non-LMC		Site	Class	Ref
1997	Elk Rapids (22–1)	2	Riverview Gabriel Richard (16–4–1)	0	Lowell High School • Lowell, MI	4	
1998	Elk Rapids (22–3–1)	2	Muskegon West Michigan Christian (18–5–1)	0	Lowell High School • Lowell, MI	4	

== Girls golf ==
Conference champions

Year	Champion
2016	Harbor Springs
2017	Harbor Springs
2018	Harbor Springs
2019	Harbor Springs
2020	Harbor Springs
2021	Harbor Springs
2022	Harbor Springs
2023	St. Franics

Team	Conference Championships	Final apps	State championships	Best finish
Harbor Springs	7	10	2	1st
St. Francis	1	5	0	6th
Grayling	0	6	0	11th
Charlevoix	0	3	0	8th
East Jordan	0	1	0	13th
Elk Rapids	0	0	0	-
Kalkaska	0	0	0	-
Boyne City	0	0	0	-

=== State-final finishes ===
Year	School	Place	Division
2004	Grayling	DNQ	3
2006	Grayling	12th	3
2009	Harbor Springs	15th	4
2010	Grayling	13th	4
2010	Harbor Springs	15th	4
2011	Grayling	12th	4
2012	Grayling	11th	4
2013	Harbor Springs	6th	4
2013	Grayling	11th	4
2014	Harbor Springs	2nd	4
2015	Harbor Springs	9th	4
2016	Harbor Springs	7th	4
2016	St. Francis	17th	4
2016	Charlevoix	17th	4
2017	Harbor Springs	1st	4
2017	Charlevoix	8th	4
2017	St. Francis	12th	4
2018	Harbor Springs	1st	4
2018	St. Francis	14th	4
2019	Harbor Springs	2nd	4
2020	Harbor Springs	7th	4
2021	St. Francis	12th	4
2023	St. Francis	6th	4
2023	Charlevoix	12th	4
2023	East Jordan	13th	4

==== Individual state champion ====
Year	Champion	School	Score	Division
2019	Jacque O'Neill	Harbor Springs	(81–83–164)	4

== Boys tennis ==
Conference champions

Year	Champion
1998-99	Harbor Springs
1999-00	Harbor Springs
2000-01	Elk Rapids
2001-02	Elk Rapids
2002-03	Elk Rapids
2003-04	Elk Rapids
2004-05	St. Francis
2005-06	Harbor Springs
2006-07	St. Francis
2007-08	St. Francis
2008-09	St. Francis
2009-10	St. Francis
2010-11	St. Francis
2011-12	St. Francis
2012-13	St. Francis
2013-14	St. Francis

=== Individual state champion ===
Year	Champion	School	Flight	Division
2009	Pat Wilson/Josh Kurtz	St. Francis	No. 2 D	4
2010	Keith Gingras/Stephen Siddall	St. Francis	No. 3 D	4
2017	Alex Thelen/Tyler Tafelsky	St. Francis	No. 4 D	4
2017	Nathan Sodini	St. Francis	No. 3 S	4
2018	Sean Navin/Brendan Chouninard	St. Francis	No. 2 D	4
2019	Brendan Chouinard/Ben Schmude	St. Francis	No. 1 D	4
2019	Cody Richards	St. Francis	No. 3 S	4
2021	Cody Richards/Ben Schmude	St. Francis	No. 1 D	4
2021	Jack Britten/Anthony Spranger	St. Francis	No. 2 D	4
2021	Charlie King/Derek Berta	St. Francis	No. 3 D	4
2021	Tristan Bonanni	St. Francis	No. 2 S	4
2021	Owen Jackson	St. Francis	No. 3 S	4
2022	Owen Jackson	St. Francis	No. 2 S	4

== Girls tennis ==
Conference champions

Year	Champion
1999-00	Harbor Springs
2000-01	Elk Rapids
2001-02	Elk Rapids
2002-03	Harbor Springs
2003-04	St. Francis
2004-05	St. Francis
2005-06	Harbor Springs
2006-07	Elk Rapids
07-2008	St. Francis
08-2009	St. Francis
09-2010	Harbor Springs
10-2011	Harbor Springs
11-2012	Harbor Springs
12-2013	St. Francis
13-2014	St. Francis
14-2015	St. Francis
15-2016	St. Francis
16-2017	Harbor Springs
17-2018	St. Francis
18-2019	St. Francis
19-2020	No champion due to the COVID-19 pandemic
20-2021	St. Francis
21-2022	St. Francis
22-2023	St. Francis
23-2024	St. Francis

=== Individual state champions ===
Year	Champion	School	Flight	Division
2012	Bailey Ray	St. Francis	No. 4 S	4
2014	Sarah Stayman/Rosie Wilson	St. Francis	No. 3 D	4
2015	Amanda Bandrowski	St. Francis	No. 1 S	4
2016	Rosie Wilson	St. Francis	No. 4 S	4
2018	Paige Davies	St. Francis	No. 4 S	4
2021	Jillian Sodini	St. Francis	No. 3 S	4
2021	Alexi Lewis	St. Francis	No. 2 S	4

== Boys basketball ==
Conference champions

Year	Champion	Record
1997-1998	Boyne City	10-2
1998-1999	Elk Rapids	11-1
1999-2000	Kalkaska	11-1
2000-2001	Charlevoix	12-0
2001-2002	Charlevoix	12-0
2002-2003	Elk Rapids & Harbor Springs	9-3
2003-2004	St. Francis	13-1
2004-2005	Grayling	13-1
2005-2006	St. Francis	13-1
2006-2007	Charlevoix	13-1
2007-2008	Charlevoix	13-1
2008-2009	St. Francis	13-1
2009-2010	St. Francis	13-1
2010-2011	Charlevoix	12-2
2011-2012	St. Francis	13-1
2012-2013	St. Francis	14-0
2013-2014	Boyne City	14-0
2014-2015	Boyne City	12-2
2015-2016	East Jordan	12-2
2016-2017	St. Francis	12-2
2017-2018	St. Francis	14-0
2018-2019	St. Francis	14-0
2019-2020	St. Francis	13-1
2020-2021	Charlevoix	13-1
2021-2022	St. Francis	14-0
2022-2023	St. Francis & Boyne City	13-1
2023-2024	Elk Rapids	12-2

Conference Records

Through 2023–24

Team	Wins	Losses	Pct.	Conference championship	District championships	Regional championships
St. Francis	275	90	.753	12	8	2
Charlevoix	241	123	.662	6	11	6
Elk Rapids	203	162	.556	3	3	0
Boyne City	187	178	.512	4	5	1
Grayling	147	147	.500	1	5	1
Harbor Springs	137	227	.376	1	5	0
Kalkaska	127	238	.348	1	0	0
East Jordan	107	259	.292	1	1	1

=== State championship appearances ===
Season	LMC		Non-LMC		Site	Class	Ref
2001	Charlevoix (23–4)	69	Kalamazoo Christian (22–6)	72	Breslin Center • East Lansing, MI	C	
2004	Charlevoix (22–6)	52	Saginaw Buena Vista (21–5)	63	Breslin Center • East Lansing, MI	C	
2012	St. Francis (25–3)	60	Flint Beecher (28–0)	74	Breslin Center • East Lansing, MI	C	
2023	St. Francis (24–5)	50	Flint Beecher (24–4)	64	Breslin Center • East Lansing, MI	3	

== Girls basketball ==
Conference champions

Year	Champion	Record
1997	Harbor Springs	12-0
1998	Harbor Springs	12-0
1999	Harbor Springs	11-1
2000	Charlevoix	12-0
2001	Charlevoix	12-0
2002	Harbor Springs	12-0
2003	St. Francis	13-1
2004	Charlevoix	14-0
2005	Charlevoix	13-1
2006	Charlevoix & Boyne City	12-2
2008	Charlevoix & East Jordan	12-2
2009	Charlevoix	14-0
2010	Kalkaska	14-0
2011	St. Francis & Kalkaska	13-1
2012	St. Francis	14-0
2013	St. Francis & Kalkaska	13-1
2014	St. Francis	14-0
2015	St. Francis & Kalkaska	13-1
2016	St. Francis	14-0
2017	St. Francis & Kalkaska	13-1
2018	St. Francis	13-1
2019	Charlevoix	14-0
2020	Charlevoix	14-0
2021	Elk Rapids	14-0
2022	Elk Rapids	13-1
2023	St. Francis	13-1
2024	Elk Rapids & Harbor Springs	13-1

Conference Records

1997–98 to 2023–2024

Team	Wins	Losses	Pct.	Conference championships	District championships	Regional championships
St. Francis	261	104	.715	10	7	2
Charlevoix	233	132	.638	8	11	2
Kalkaska	223	142	.611	5	8	2
Elk Rapids	170	195	.466	3	6	1
Harbor Springs	167	197	.459	5	7	1
Boyne City	158	208	.432	1	0	0
East Jordan	153	212	.419	1	1	0
Grayling	59	234	.201	0	0	0

=== State championship appearances ===
Season	LMC		Non-LMC		Site	Class	Ref
2004	Charlevoix (27–1)	56	Detroit St. Martin dePorres (23–2)	61	Breslin Center • East Lansing, MI	C	
2016	St. Francis (26–2)	37	Ypsi Arbor Prep (25–2)	53	Breslin Center • East Lansing, MI	C	

== Wrestling ==
Conference champions

Year	Champion
2006	Grayling
2007	Kalkaska
2008	Grayling
2009	Grayling
2010	St. Francis
2011	St. Francis
2012	St. Francis
2013	Grayling
2014	Grayling
2015	Grayling
2016	Grayling
2017	Grayling
2018	Grayling
2019	Grayling
2020	Grayling
2021	Grayling
2022	St. Francis
2023	Charlevoix
2024	Charlevoix

Team	Conference championship	District championships	Regional championships
St. Francis	4	8	0
Kalkaska	1	1	0
East Jordan	0	0	0
Boyne City	0	3	0
Elk Rapids	0	1	0
Charlevoix	2	3	0
Grayling	12	10	0
Harbor Springs	0	0	0

=== Individual state champions ===
Year	Champion	School	Weight	Division
2008	Andy Anderson	St. Francis	160	4
2011	Isaiah Schaub	St. Francis	130	4
2012	Isaiah Schaub	St. Francis	135	4
2019	Andy Simaz	St. Francis	152	4
2021	Gavin Wilmoth	St. Francis	152	4
2022	Lydia Krauss	Boyne City	155	Girls
2023	Josiah Schaub	St. Francis	138	4
2024	Brady Jess	Charlevoix	175	4
2024	Landon Swanson	Charlevoix	215	4

== Boys skiing ==
Conference champions

Year	Champion
1998	Harbor Springs
1999	Harbor Springs
2000	Harbor Springs
2001	Charlevoix
2002	Charlevoix
2003	Harbor Springs
2004	Harbor Springs
2005	Harbor Springs
2006	Harbor Springs
2007	Harbor Springs
2008	Boyne City
2009	St. Francis & Boyne City
2010	Harbor Springs
2011	St. Francis
2012	St. Francis
2013	Harbor Springs
2014	Elk Rapids-St. Francis*/Harbor Springs
2015	Harbor Springs
2016	Elk Rapids-St. Francis*
2017	Elk Rapids-St. Francis*
2018	Great North Alpine*
2019	Great North Alpine*
2020	Great North Alpine*
2021	Great North Alpine*
2022	Great North Alpine*/Harbor Springs
2023	Great North Alpine*/Harbor Springs
2024	Harbor Springs

- St. Francis and Elk Rapids were a co-op for their 2014,2016 & 2017 championships. Great North Alpine was a co-op between St. Francis, Elk Rapids, Central Lake and Grand Traverse Academy.

== Girls skiing ==
Conference champions

Year	Champion
1998	Harbor Springs
1999	Harbor Springs
2000	Harbor Springs
2001	Harbor Springs
2002	Harbor Springs
2003	Harbor Springs
2004	St. Francis
2005	St. Francis
2006	St. Francis
2007	Boyne City
2008	St. Francis
2009	Harbor Springs
2010	Harbor Springs
2011	Harbor Springs
2012	Harbor Springs
2013	Harbor Springs
2014	Harbor Springs
2015	Harbor Springs
2016	Harbor Springs
2017	Harbor Springs
2018	Harbor Springs
2019	Harbor Springs
2020	Harbor Springs
2021	Harbor Springs
2022	Harbor Springs
2023	Harbor Springs
2024	Harbor Springs

== Baseball ==
Conference champions

Year	Champion	Record
1998	Elk Rapids	12-0
1999	Boyne City	11-0-1
2000	Kalkaska & East Jordan	8-3
2001	Elk Rapids & East Jordan	9-2-1
2002	Kalkaska	12-0
2003	Kalkaska	14-0
2004	Boyne City	14-0
2005	Elk Rapids	11-3
2006	Kalkaska	11-3
2007	Elk Rapids	11-3
2008	Elk Rapids	10-4
2009	East Jordan	12-1-1
2010	Kalkaska	13-1
2011	Kalkaska & Boyne City	11-3
2012	St. Francis & East Jordan	11-3
2013	Charlevoix	14-0
2014	St. Francis	12-2
2015	St. Francis & Charlevoix	12-2
2016	St. Francis	12-2
2017	St. Francis	14-0
2018	St. Francis	14-0
2019	St. Francis	13-0
2020	No champion due to the COVID-19 pandemic	
2021	St. Francis	13-1
2022	St. Francis	12-2
2023	Charlevoix	12-2
2024	Charlevoix	14-0

Team	Conference championship	District championships	Regional championships
St. Francis	9	9 (2004, 2011, 2014, 2015, 2017, 2018, 2019, 2021, 2022)	2 (2017, 2021)
Kalkaska	6	8 (1999, 2000, 2002, 2004, 2006, 2010, 2013, 2016)	2 (2005, 2010)
East Jordan	4	7 (2000, 2001, 2007, 2008, 2009, 2023, 2024)	2 (2000, 2008)
Charlevoix	4	3 (2013, 2023, 2024)	1 (2024)
Boyne City	3	12 (1998, 1999, 2002, 2003, 2004, 2005, 2014, 2016, 2017, 2018, 2019, 2022)	0
Elk Rapids	5	3 (2006, 2007, 2008)	0
Grayling	0	3 (2023, 2024)	0
Harbor Springs	0	2 (2021, 2024)	0

=== State Finals Appearances ===
Season	Round	LMC		Non-LMC		Site	Class	Ref
2005	Semis	Kalkaska (26–9)	0	Michigan Center (23–8)	1	Bailey Park • Battle Creek, MI	3	
2017	Semis	St. Francis (38–3)	3	Schoolcraft (25–11)	2	McLane Stadium • East Lansing, MI	3	
2017	Finals	St. Francis (38–4)	0	Madison Heights Bishop Foley (25–12–1)	3	McLane Stadium • East Lansing, MI	3	
2021	Semis	St. Francis (28–9)	5	Richmond (30–6)	4	McLane Stadium • East Lansing, MI	3	
2021	Finals	St. Francis (28–10)	0	Grosse Pte. Woods Univ. Liggett (31–5)	12	McLane Stadium • East Lansing, MI	3	
2024	Semis	Charlevoix (27–11–1)	2	Jackson Lumen Christi (30–10)	3	McLane Stadium • East Lansing, MI	3	

== Softball ==
Conference champions

Year	Champion	Record
1998	Elk Rapids	11-1
1999	Elk Rapids	
2000	East Jordan & St. Francis	
2001	St. Francis	
2002	St. Francis	12-0
2003	Elk Rapids	12-0
2004	St. Francis	14-0
2005	Kalkaska	14-0
2006	Kalkaska	14-0
2007	St. Francis	13-1
2008	Kalkaska	13-1
2009	East Jordan	12-2
2010	East Jordan & Kalkaska	13-1
2011	St. Francis, Kalkaska, Charlevoix	11-3
2012	St. Francis	13-1
2013	St. Francis & Charlevoix	12-2
2014	St. Francis & Boyne City	13-1
2015	St. Francis	13-1
2016	Boyne City	13-1
2017	Kalkaska	14-0
2018	Kalkaska & Boyne City	13-1
2019	Kalkaska	13-1
2020	No champion due to the COVID-19 pandemic	
2021	St. Francis	13-1
2022	St. Francis	11-1
2023	St. Francis	14-0
2024	St. Francis	12-0

Team	Conference championship	District championships	Regional championships
St. Francis	14	21 (1998, 2000-02, 2004-16, 2018, 2021-22, 2024)	6 (2000-02, 2009-10, 2015)
Kalkaska	8	14 (1999, 2002, 2004-10, 2016-18, 2021-22)	1 (2022)
Elk Rapids	3	7 (1998-00, 2002-04, 2023)	2 (2002, 2003)
Boyne City	3	10 (1998, 2013-19, 2022, 2024)	0
Charlevoix	2	4 (2009-11, 2021)	1 (2021)
East Jordan	3	6 (1999, 2007-08, 2018-19, 2023)	0
Grayling	0	4 (2000, 2017, 2023-24)	0
Harbor Springs	0	2 (1999, 2024)	0

=== State Finals Appearances ===
Season	Round	LMC		Non-LMC		Site	Class	Ref
2000	Semis	St. Francis (37–4)	0	Mason County Eastern (28–4)	1	Flannery Field #3 • Battle Creek, MI	4	
2001	Semis	St. Francis (38–1)	1	Tekonsha (29–4)	0	Morrison #1 • Battle Creek, MI	4	
2001	Finals	St. Francis (38–2)	1	Mason County Eastern (38–2)	5	Flannery Field #1 • Battle Creek, MI	4	
2002	Semis	St. Francis (33–6)	1	Springport (28–10)	2	Diamond One • Battle Creek, MI	4	

== Boys track ==
Conference champions

Year	Champion
1998	East Jordan
1999	East Jordan
2000	East Jordan
2001	East Jordan
2002	Charlevoix
2003	Harbor Springs
2004	Harbor Springs
2005	Charlevoix
2006	Charlevoix
2007	Charlevoix
2008	Harbor Springs
2009	Harbor Springs
2010	Charlevoix
2011	Charlevoix
2012	Charlevoix
2013	Charlevoix
2014	Charlevoix
2015	Charlevoix
2016	Charlevoix
2017	Charlevoix
2018	Harbor Springs
2019	Harbor Springs
2020	No champion due to the COVID-19 pandemic
2021	St. Francis
2022	St. Francis
2023	St. Francis
2024	Charlevoix

Individual state champions

Year	Champion	School	Event	Time/Distance	Class
1999	Jacques Henning	Harbor Springs	1600m	04:18.4	C
2001	Josh Brown	Kalkaska	High Jump	6'9	D2
2005	Josh Hofbauer	Harbor Springs	3200m	09:34.6	D3
2016	Jacob Lechner	Harbor Springs	Shot Put	53'04	D4
2017	Carson, Ritter, Ritter, Buday	Charlevoix	3200 Relay	8:03.13	D3
2017	Jeremy Kloss	Harbor Springs	3200m	9:46.25	D4
2017	Jeremy Kloss	Harbor Springs	1600m	4:25.73	D4
2018	Jacob Ager	Boyne City	Shot Put	59'10	D3
2019	Hoffman, Smar, Harrell, Kloss	Harbor Springs	3200 Relay	8:01.31	D4
2019	Kloss, Cameron, Harrell, Smar	Harbor Springs	1600 Relay	4:15.59	D4
2019	Jeremy Kloss	Harbor Springs	1600	4:15.59	D4
2021	Tarrant, Heeringa, Ellalasingham, Richards	St. Francis	3200 Relay	8:16.64	D3
2022	Richards, Donahue, Kerr, Heeringa	St. Francis	3200 Relay	8:10.56	D3
2023	Mitchel Harrington	Grayling	Long Jump	22'1.75	D3
2024	Max Ward	Elk Rapids	300 Hurdle	38.53	D3
2024	Drew Moore	Grayling	3200	9:32.16	D3
2024	Walter, Myler, Carlson, Krumm	St. Francis	3200 Relay	7:59.31	D3

== Girls track ==
Conference champions

Year	Champion
1998	Charlevoix
1999	St. Francis
2000	Boyne City
2002	Boyne City
2003	St. Francis
2004	East Jordan
2005	East Jordan
2006	East Jordan
2007	Charlevoix
2008	Charlevoix & Harbor Springs
2009	Harbor Springs
2010	St. Francis
2011	Charlevoix
2012	Charlevoix
2013	St. Francis
2014	St. Francis
2015	Harbor Springs
2016	St. Francis
2017	St. Francis
2018	St. Francis
2019	St. Francis
2020	No champion due to the COVID-19 pandemic
2021	St. Francis
2022	St. Francis
2023	St. Francis
2024	St. Francis

Individual state champions

Year	Champion	School	Event	Time/Distance	Class
2000	Sarah Adelaine	Harbor Springs	Shot Put	41'9	D4
2002	Andres, Taylor, Fewins, DeMerle	St. Francis	3200 Relay	9:50.99	D4
2003	Brown, Taylor, Fewins, DeMerle	St. Francis	3200 Relay	9:58.58	D4
2004	Katie Martin	Boyne City	Pole Valut	10'9	D3
2012	Hegewald, Danz, McDonnell, Buckel	St. Francis	1600 Relay	4:12.47	D3
2012	Lauren Buckel	St. Francis	400m	59.93	D3
2012	Lauren Buckel	St. Francis	200m	26.49	D3
2013	Holly Bullough	St. Francis	1600m	5:07.37	D3
2013	Holly Bullough	St. Francis	800m	2:16.53	D3
2013	Lauren Buckel	St. Francis	400m	59.54	D3
2013	Amber Way	Charlevoix	3200m	10:48.48	D3
2014	Holly Bullough	St. Francis	1600m	5:01.34	D3
2014	Holly Bullough	St. Francis	800m	2:15.52	D3
2014	Amber Way	Charlevoix	3200m	10:53.33	D3
2014	Kylie Hicks	Boyne City	300 Hurdles	44.59	D3
2015	Kayla Keane	East Jordan	3200m	10:57.54	D3
2015	Cullip, Fleming, LaRue, Sampson	Harbor Springs	1600 Relay	4:08.14	D4
2015	Salix Sampson	Harbor Springs	400m	59.99	D4
2016	Holly Bullough	St. Francis	3200m	4:52.63	D3
2016	Holly Bullough	St. Francis	1600m	2:12.22	D3
2016	Fifarek, Duffing, Tarsa, Bullough	St. Francis	3200 Relay	9:23.95	D4
2016	Erika Lechner	Harbor Springs	Shot Put	41'11.75	D4
**2016**	**Caylin Bonser**	**Harbor Springs**	**Discus**	**141'06**	**D4**
**2017**	**Erika Lechner**	**Harbor Springs**	**Shot Put**	**44'1.5**	**D4**
2018	Anna Harmeling	Boyne City	Pole Vault	11'6	D3
2019	Maggie Stevenson	East Jordan	Shot Put	40'4.25	D4
2022	Rylan Finstrom	Grayling	Discus	145'2	D3
2024	Rylan Finstrom	Grayling	Discus	135'3	D3

Bold= MHSAA girls track & field final meet records

== Boys golf ==
Conference champions

Year	Champion
1997-98	Charlevoix
1998-99	Harbor Springs
1999-00	St. Francis
2000-01	St. Francis, Harbor Springs, Charlevoix
2001-02	Charlevoix
2002-03	Harbor Springs
2003-04	Grayling
2004-05	Grayling
2005-06	St. Francis
2006-07	St. Francis
07-2008	St. Francis
08-2009	St. Francis
09-2010	Charlevoix
10-2011	Charlevoix
11-2012	Kalkaska
12-2013	Charlevoix
13-2014	Kalkaska
14-2015	St. Francis
15-2016	St. Francis
16-2017	Charlevoix
17-2018	Elk Rapids
18-2019	Elk Rapids
19-2020	No champion due to the COVID-19 pandemic
20-2021	Charlevoix
21-2022	St. Francis
22-2023	Charlevoix

State Final Finishes

1997- none

1998- none

1999- none

2000- Charlevoix 3rd D3, St. Francis 8th D4, Harbor Springs 9th D4

2001- Elk Rapids 12th D3, Harbor Springs 2nd D4, St. Francis 3rd D4

2002- Charlexoix 15th D3, Harbor Springs 3rd D4, St. Francis 4th D4

2003- Grayling 3rd D3, Charlevoix 15th D3, St. Francis 3rd* D4, Harbor Springs 12th D4

2004- Grayling 2nd D3, St. Francis 1st D4

2005- St. Francis 2nd D4

2006- Elk Rapids 15th D3, St. Francis 2nd D4, Harbor Springs 4th D4

2007- none

2008- St. Francis 1st D4, Harbor Springs 10th D4

2009- Charlevoix 12th D3, St. Francis 3rd D4, Habor Springs 6th D4

2010- Charlevoix 8th D3

2011- Charlevoix 7th D3, St. Francis 11th D4

2012- none

2013- Charlevoix 13th D3, Harbor Springs 12th D4

2014- Kalkaska 3rd D3, Charlevoix 2nd D4, St. Francis 6th D4

2015- St. Francis 11th D4

2016- Harbor Springs 8th D4

2017- Charlevoix 8th D3, Harbor Springs 9th D4

2018- Charlevoix 10th D3, Elk Rapids 13th D3

2019- Elk Rapids 6th D3

2021- Elk Rapids 9th D3, Boyne City 10th D3, Charlevoix 4th D4, Harbor Springs 15th D4

2022- St. Francis 4th D3, Boyne City 12th D3, Charlevoix 5th D4

2023- St. Francis 14th D3, Charlevoix 4th D4

- St. Francis was in a three-way tie for 1st place. Due to tiebreakers they finished 3rd.

Team	Conference championships	appearances	State championships	Best finish
St. Francis	10	14	2	1st
Harbor Springs	3	11	0	2nd
Charlevoix	9	13	0	3rd
Elk Rapids	2	5	0	6th
Grayling	1	2	0	2nd
Kalkaska	2	1	0	3rd
Boyne City	0	1	0	10th
East Jordan	0	0	0	-

Individual Champion

Year	Champion	School	Score	Division
2003	Colin Casciano	St. Francis	(76–78–154)	4
2004	Don Kring	St. Francis	(70–71–141)	4
2017	Matt Good	Charlevoix	(75–75–150)	3

== Girls soccer ==
Conference champions

Year	Champion	Record
2004	Harbor Springs	
2005	Charlevoix & Elk Rapids	10-1-1
2006	Charlevoix	12-0
2007	Charlevox	14-0
2008	Charlevoix	13-1
2009	Elk Rapids	14-0
2010	Harbor Springs	10-1-3
2011	Harbor Springs	9-1-2
2012	Charlevoix	11-1
2014	Harbor Springs	13-1
2014	Charlevoix	13-1
2015	Charlevoix	12-0
2016	Elk Rapids	12-0
2017	Harbor Springs	11-1
2018	Boyne City	10-0-2
2019	Boyne City	11-0-1
2020	No champion due to the COVID-19 pandemic	
2021	Boyne City & Elk Rapids	9-1
2022	Elk Rapids	10-0
2023	Elk Rapids	10-0
2024	St. Francis	9-0-1

Team	Conference championship	District championships	Regional championships
St. Francis*	1	7	0
Kalkaska	0	0	0
East Jordan	0	0	0
Boyne City	3	2	2
Elk Rapids	6	15	1
Charlevoix	7	8	1
Grayling	0	0	0
Harbor Springs	5	11	3

- St. Francis was the host of a Co-Op program with Traverse City Christian and Grand Traverse Academy until the 2024 school year.

State championship Appearances

Season	LMC		Non-LMC		Site	Class	Ref
2001	Harbor Springs (21–2–1)	1	Clawson (21–0–3)	2	Canton Community Schools • Canton, MI	4	
2021	Boyne City (21–2–2)	0	Detroit Country Day (17–2–2)	3	Demartin Soccer Complex • East Lansing, MI	3	

== State champions by school ==
Boyne City: boys track and field, 1957, 1958; girls skiing, 2007 (3)

Charlevoix: boys cross country 1982, 1983, 1987, 1988, 1989, 1990, 1991 (7)

East Jordan: boys tennis 1955; boys cross country, 1998, 2000 (3)

Elk Rapids: boys soccer, 1997–98; girls skiing, 2016; boys skiing, 2019 (4)

Grayling: boys basketball, 1917 (1)

Harbor Springs: boys basketball, 1929; boys cross country, 2002, 2003, 2004; girls cross country, 2008, 2009; boys skiing, 1996, 2003, 2005–06,2010; girls skiing, 1987, 1988, 2000, 2001, 2002, 2003, 2004,2012; girls track 2015; girls golf 2017,2018 (22)

Kalkaska: Boys Basketball, 1916 (1)

Traverse City St. Francis: baseball, 1990; boys bowling, 2004; girls cross country, 2003,2015,2016,2022; football, 1992, 1999, 2003, 2005, 2008, 2009; boys golf, 2004, 2008; girls skiing, 2005, 2016; boys skiing, 2019; girls track and field 2013, boys tennis 2021 (19)

== Athletes who participated In NCAA Division I athletics ==
School	Athlete	Sport	College/university	Ref
Boyne City	Jason Rozycki	Basketball	Oakland University	
Boyne City	Taylor Voice	Track and field	University of Michigan	
Boyne City	Jason Richards	Baseball	Western Michigan University	
Boyne City	Kristen Gaither	Basketball	University of Detroit Mercy	
Boyne City	Malik Smith	Football	Michigan State University	
Boyne City	Corey Redman	Basketball	Central Michigan University	
Charlevoix	Eric Buday	Track and field	Michigan State University	
Charlevoix	Bill Taylor	Cross country	Central Michigan University	
Charlevoix	Matt Peterson	Cross country	Central Michigan University	
Charlevoix	John Tunison	Cross country	Central Michigan University	
Charlevoix	Jeff Drenth	Cross country	Central Michigan University	
Charlevoix	Doug Drenth	Cross country	Central Michigan University	
Charlevoix	Douglas Bergmann	Cross country	College of William & Mary	
Charlevoix	Scott Miller	Cross country	College of William & Mary	
Charlevoix	Scott Friske	Basketball	Brown University	
Charlevoix	Bill Ivan	Football	Indiana University	
Charlevoix	Ben Myers	Soccer	Michigan State University	
Charlevoix	Amber Way	Cross country	Michigan State University	
Charlevoix	Molly Jeakle	Cross country	Michigan State University	
Charlevoix	Megan Scholten	Soccer	University of Memphis	
Charlevoix	Zach Hankins	Basketball	Xavier University	
Charlevoix	Blaise Snabes	Soccer	Western Illinois University	
Charlevoix	Elise Stuck	Basketball	University of Michigan	
Charlevoix	Evan Solomon	Basketball	Oakland University	
Charlevoix	Landon Swanson	Football	Central Michigan University	
Charlevoix	Brayden Greensky	Football	Central Michigan University	
East Jordan	Tarn Leach	Cross country	University of Michigan	
East Jordan	Shaina Peters	Softball	Eastern Michigan University	
East Jordan	Kayla Keane	Cross country	University of Michigan	
East Jordan	Sophie Snyder	Rowing	University of Michigan	
Elk Rapids	Amanda Hammer	Cross country	Baylor University	
Elk Rapids	Adam Trautman	Football	University of Dayton	
Elk Rapids	Alec Trautman	Football	University of Dayton	
Elk Rapids	Audriana Hammond	Gymnastics	Central Michigan University	
Elk Rapids	Garrison Waugh	Rowing	University of Wisconsin	
Elk Rapids	Joshua Lavely	Golf	Villanova University	
Elk Rapids	Lauren Bingham	Soccer	Bellarmine University	
Grayling	Zac Baker	Football	University of Michigan	
Grayling	Jason Drudge	Track and field	Central Michigan University	
Grayling	Nick Hunter	Football	Michigan State University	
Grayling	David Millikin	Football	Michigan State University	
Harbor Springs	Stephanie Adelaine	Basketball	Wofford College	
Harbor Springs	Christi Shibata	Basketball	Kent State University	
Harbor Springs	Brandon Darnton	Basketball	Michigan State University	
Harbor Springs	Spencer Beatty	Track and field	Michigan State University	
Harbor Springs	Tecumseh Adams	Cross country	Central Michigan University	
Harbor Springs	Sarah Adelaine	Track and field	Michigan State University	
Harbor Springs	Jacques Henning	Track and field	Central Michigan University	
Harbor Springs	Jacob Kloss	Cross country	Michigan State University	
Harbor Springs	Jeremy Kloss	Cross country	Michigan State University	
Harbor Springs	Josh Hofbauer	Cross country	Michigan State University	
Harbor Springs	Alyssa Hunt	Rowing	Drake University	
Harbor Springs	Kalie Grambeau	Soccer	Purdue University	
Kalkaska	Adam Norman	Cross country	Michigan State University	
Kalkaska	Paul Greive	Cross country	Michigan State University	
Kalkaska	Josh Brown	Track and field	Western Michigan University	
Kalkaska	Leigh Ann Dalton	Basketball	Bowling Green University	
Kalkaska	Sara Vergote	Cross country	University of Toledo	
St. Francis	Patrick Rigan	Football	Michigan State University	
St. Francis	Matt Zakrzewski	Football	Indiana University	
St. Francis	Holden Greiner	Basketball	Lehigh University	
St. Francis	Erin Carney	Basketball	DePaul University	
St. Francis	Katy Olsen	Track and field	Central Michigan University	
St. Francis	Abby Clear	Volleyball	St. Francis College	
St. Francis	Joe Kerridge	Football	University of Michigan	
St. Francis	Max Bullough	Football	Michigan State University	
St. Francis	Riley Bullough	Football	Michigan State University	
St. Francis	Kyle Lints	Football	Michigan State University	
St. Francis	Sean Sheldon	Basketball	College of William & Mary	
St. Francis	Matt Benson	Football	Xavier University	
St. Francis	Matt Seybert	Football	Michigan State University	
St. Francis	Jake Khoury	Football	University of Buffalo	
St. Francis	Erin McDonnell	Cross country	United States Naval Academy	
St. Francis	Byron Bullough	Football	Michigan State University	
St. Francis	Holly Bullough	Cross country	Michigan State University	
St. Francis	Brady Buell	Football	Central Michigan University	
St. Francis	Juliana Phillips	Volleyball	Saint Louis University	
St. Francis	Molly Mirabelli	Volleyball	Purdue University Fort Wayne	
St. Francis	Natalie Graf	Soccer	Valparaiso University	
St. Francis	Chris Kolarevic	Football	University of Nebraska–Lincoln	
St. Francis	Michael Hegewald	Football	Central Michigan University	
St. Francis	Tyler Prichard	Baseball	United States Military Academy	
St. Francis	Andrew Simaz	Wrestling	University of Iowa	
St. Francis	Abby Hathaway	Rowing	University of Michigan	
St. Francis	Blake Rowe	Swimming	Purdue University	
St. Francis	Wyatt Nausadis	Basketball	American University	

=== Other notable athletes ===
Robert Boss, Charlevoix - former American football coach and player.

Damon Sheehy-Guiseppi, St. Francis — professional football player with the Cleveland Browns

Angus MacLellan, St. Francis — professional rugby player with the United States national rugby union team
