= Northern Shores Conference =

High school athletic conference

- Conference: MHSAA
- Founded: 2024
- No. of teams: 8
- Region: Northern Michigan

Locations
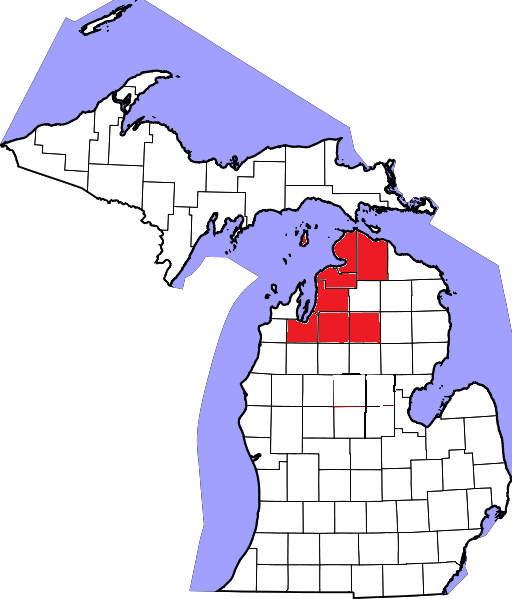

Northern Shores Conference
Location of NSC Members:

The Northern Shores Conference (NSC) is an interscholastic athletic conference affiliated with the Michigan High School Athletic Association. It began play during the 2024–2025 school year. It is located in Northern Michigan and contains eight teams that encompasses seven counties: Antrim County, Charlevoix County, Cheboygan County, Crawford County, Emmet County, Grand Traverse County, and Kalkaska County.

== History ==
The Northern Shores Conference was announced in April 2023, comprising six teams from the Lake Michigan Conference and one each from the Northwest and Straits Area Conference. The conference formed following the dissolution of the old Lake Michigan Conference, the schools in the conference had concerns with Traverse City St. Francis, and their domination in most of the sports offered, they had almost 50 more conference champions than the next closest school. East Jordan was the first school announced to leave; they were joining the smaller Ski-Valley Conference for all sports. Kingsley, who had previously been denied entry into the Lake Michigan Conference in 2017, and Cheboygan were invited by the remaining six LMC teams, sans St. Francis, to form the new conference.

Administrators at the schools feel the new conference will have better competitive balance, as well as maintaining some of the rivalries that have formed over the years. The new conference however does not affect its members schools association with the Northern Michigan Football League, the new conference will not sponsor football, all member schools except Kalkaska are current members of the NMFL.

In October 2025, it was announced that the Northern Shores Conference would sponsor football starting in the 2026 season, with the exception of Harbor Springs, who will stay in the Northern Michigan Football League. The seven other schools will play a 7-game schedule with non-league games to open and close the season, and one team playing a non-league game each week from weeks two through eight.

== Members ==
Team & Mascot	School	Location	Joined	Enrollment	Class	Prior Conference	Boys Champ	Girls Champ	Total Champ
Boyne City Ramblers	Boyne City High School	Boyne City, Michigan	2024	368	B	Lake Michigan Conference	1	1	2
Charlevoix Rayders	Charlevoix High School	Charlevoix, Michigan	2024	269	C	Lake Michigan Conference	7		7
Cheboygan Chiefs	Cheboygan High School	Cheboygan, Michigan	2024	395	B	Straits Area Conference	1		1
Elk Rapids Elks	Elk Rapids High School	Elk Rapids, Michigan	2024	356	C	Lake Michigan Conference	10	2	12
Grayling Vikings	Grayling High School	Grayling, Michigan	2024	413	B	Lake Michigan Conference	1		1
Harbor Springs Rams	Harbor Springs High School	Harbor Springs, Michigan	2024	252	C	Lake Michigan Conference	2	10	12
Kalkaska Blazers	Kalkaska High School	Kalkaska, Michigan	2024	393	B	Lake Michigan Conference	1		1
Kingsley Stags	Kingsley High School	Kingsley, Michigan	2024	393	B	Northwest Conference		6	6

== Sports ==
=== Boy's sponsored sports by school ===
School	Baseball	Basketball	Bowling	Cross Country	Football	Golf	Ice hockey	Lacrosse	Skiing- Alpine	Soccer	Tennis	Track & field	Wrestling	Total
Boyne City Ramblers	✓	✓	✓	✓	✓	✓	✓	✓	✓	✓	✗	✓	✓	12
Charlevoix Rayders	✓	✓	✗	✓	✓	✓	✓	✗	✓	✓	✗	✓	✓	10
Cheboygan Chiefs	✓	✓	✗	✓	✓	✓	✓	✗	✗	✓	✗	✓	✓	9
Elk Rapids Elks	✓	✓	✓	✓	✓	✓	✓	✗	✓	✓	✓	✓	✗	11
Grayling Vikings	✓	✓	✓	✓	✓	✓	✗	✗	✓	✓	✗	✓	✓	10
Harbor Springs Rams	✓	✓	✗	✓	✓	✓	✓	✓	✓	✓	✓	✓	✗	11
Kalkaska Blazers	✓	✓	✗	✓	✓	✓	✓	✗	✗	✓	✗	✓	✓	9
Kingsley Stags	✓	✓	✓	✓	✓	✓	✓	✗	✗	✓	✗	✓	✓	10

Notes:

° Boyne City - Co-ops with Charlevoix in Skiing; Co-ops with Petoskey, Petoskey St. Michael and Harbor Springs in Hockey and Lacrosse.

° Charlevoix - Co-ops with Boyne City in Skiing; Co-ops with Elk Rapids, Kalkaska, Kingsley, Lake Leelanau St. Mary, Mancelona, Suttons Bay and Traverse City St. Francis in Hockey.

° Cheboygan - Co-ops with Indian River-Inland Lakes, Onaway, Pellston and St. Ignace in Ice Hockey

° Elk Rapids - Co-ops with Charlevoix, Kalkaska, Kingsley, Lake Leelanau St. Mary, Mancelona, Suttons Bay and Traverse City St. Francis in Hockey; Co-ops with Central Lake and Traverse City St. Francis in Skiing.

° Harbor Springs - Co-ops with Petoskey, Petoskey St. Michael and Boyne City in Hockey and Lacrosse; Co-ops with Harbor Light Christian and Petoskey St. Michael in Football.

° Kalkaska - Co-ops with Charlevoix, Elk Rapids, Kingsley, Lake Leelanau St. Mary, Mancelona, Suttons Bay and Traverse City St. Francis in Hockey.

° Kingsley - Charlevoix, Elk Rapids, Kalkaska, Lake Leelanau St. Mary, Mancelona, Suttons Bay and Traverse City St. Francis in Hockey.

=== Girl's sponsored sports by school ===
School	Basketball	Bowling	Cross Country	Golf	Skiing- Alpine	Soccer	Softball	Tennis	Track & field	Volleyball	Competitive Cheer	Total
Boyne City Ramblers	✓	✓	✓	✓	✓	✓	✓	✓	✓	✓	✗	10
Charlevoix Rayders	✓	✗	✓	✓	✓	✓	✓	✓	✓	✓	✗	9
Cheboygan Chiefs	✓	✓	✓	✓	✓	✓	✓	✗	✓	✓	✗	8
Elk Rapids Elks	✓	✗	✓	✓	✓	✓	✓	✓	✓	✓	✓	10
Grayling Vikings	✓	✓	✓	✓	✓	✓	✓	✓	✓	✓	✗	10
Harbor Springs Rams	✓	✗	✓	✓	✓	✓	✓	✓	✓	✓	✗	9
Kalkaska Blazers	✓	✗	✓	✓	✗	✓	✓	✗	✓	✓	✗	7
Kingsley Stags	✓	✓	✓	✗	✗	✓	✓	✗	✓	✓	✗	7

Notes:

° Elk Rapids - Co-ops with Central Lake and Traverse City St. Francis in Skiing.

° Harbor Springs - Co-ops with Petoskey St. Michael in Tennis,

== Football ==
Includes information about each team's performances since the 2026 Fall season, the first season where the NSC adopted Football. Note: Harbor Springs does not compete in the NSC for Football.

=== Achievement History ===
Team	Conference Record	Conference Titles	District Titles	Regional Titles
Kingsley	5-0	1	1	1
Charlevoix	4-1	0	1	0
Elk Rapids	3-2	0	0	0
Boyne City	2-3	0	0	0
Grayling	1-4	0	0	0
Kalkaska	0-5	0	0	0
Cheboygan	0-0	0	0	0

=== Conference Champions ===
Year	Champion	Record
2026	Kingsley	5-0

=== District Champions ===
Year	Champion	Division
2026	Kingsley	6
2026	Charlevoix	7

=== Regional Champions ===
Year	Champion	Division
2026	Kingsley	6

=== Finals Appearances ===
Year	Round	NSC		Non-NSC		Site	Division
2026	Semifinal	Kingsley (12-1)	6	Almont (13-0)	30	Clare High School • Clare, MI	6

== Boys Soccer ==
Includes information about each team's performances since the 2024 Fall season, the first season under the NSC.

=== Achievement History ===
Team	Conference Record	Conference Titles	District Titles	Regional Titles	State Titles
Elk Rapids	37-1-0	3	3	2	1
Harbor Springs	29-8-1	0	3	0	0
Grayling	25-14-1	1	0	0	0
Charlevoix	21-19-0	0	0	0	0
Kingsley	15-23-2	0	0	0	0
Boyne City	11-26-3	0	0	0	0
Kalkaska	7-18-3	0	0	0	0
Cheboygan	0-37-3	0	0	0	0

=== Conference Champions ===
Year	Champion	Record
2024	Elk Rapids & Grayling	11-1-0
2025	Elk Rapids	14-0-0
2026	Elk Rapids	12-0-0

=== District Champions ===
Year	Champion	Division
2024	Elk Rapids	3
2024	Harbor Springs	4
2025	Elk Rapids	3
2025	Harbor Springs	4
2026	Elk Rapids	3
2026	Harbor Springs	4

=== Regional Champions ===
Year	Champion	Division
2024	Elk Rapids	3
2026	Elk Rapids	3

=== Finals Appearances ===
Season	Round	NSC		Non-NSC		Site	Division	Ref
2024	Semifinal	Elk Rapids (18-6-1)	3	Hartford (20-2-1)	0	Cedar Springs High School • Cedar Springs, MI	3	
2024	Final	Elk Rapids (18-7-1)	2	Pontiac Notre Dame Prep (23-2-0)	3	Grand Ledge High School • Grand Ledge, MI	3	
2026	Semifinal	Elk Rapids (23-1-3)	2	Grand Rapids NorthPointe Christian (20-4-1)	0	Cedar Springs High School • Cedar Springs, MI	3	
2026	Final	Elk Rapids (24-1-3)	1 (OT)	Williamston (12-9-4)	0	Grand Ledge High School • Grand Ledge, MI	3	

== Boys Cross Country ==
Includes information about each team's performances since the 2024 Fall season, the first season under the NSC. Note on MHSAA Cross Country: To qualify for the Finals, a team must place in the top three of their Regional. They do not need to strictly achieve 1st place.

=== Achievement History ===
Team	Conference Titles	Regional Titles	Finals Appearances	State Titles	Best Finish
Charlevoix	3	2	3	2	1st
Harbor Springs	0	1	2	0	4th
Boyne City	0	0	0	0	
Cheboygan	0	0	0	0	
Elk Rapids	0	0	0	0	
Grayling	0	0	0	0	
Kalkaska	0	0	0	0	
Kingsley	0	0	0	0	

=== Conference Champions ===
==== Team ====
Year	Champion	Points
2024	Charlevoix	27
2025	Charlevoix	23
2026	Charlevoix	23

==== Individual ====
Year	Champion	School	Time
2024	Hunter Eaton	Charlevoix	16:41.33
2025	Hunter Eaton	Charlevoix	15:59.14
2026	Hunter Eaton	Charlevoix	15:49.6

=== Regional Champions ===
Year	Champion	Division
2024	Harbor Springs	4
2025	Charlevoix	3
2026	Charlevoix	3

=== Final Appearances ===
Year	School	Place	Division
2024	Charlevoix	14th	3
2024	Harbor Springs	4th	4
2025	Charlevoix	1st	3
2025	Harbor Springs	25th	3
2026	Charlevoix	1st	3

=== State Champions ===
Year	Champion	School	Division	Time
2025	Hunter Eaton	Charlevoix	3	15:30.80

== Girls Cross Country ==
Includes information about each team's performances since the 2024 Fall season, the first season under the NSC. Note on MHSAA Cross Country: To qualify for the Finals, a team must place in the top three of their Regional. They do not need to strictly achieve 1st place.

=== Achievement History ===
Team	Conference Titles	Regional Titles	Finals Appearances	State Titles	Best Finish
Harbor Springs	3	1	3	0	4th
Boyne City	0	0	1	0	26th
Charlevoix	0	0	0	0	
Cheboygan	0	0	0	0	
Elk Rapids	0	0	0	0	
Grayling	0	0	0	0	
Kalkaska	0	0	0	0	
Kingsley	0	0	0	0	

=== Conference Champions ===
==== Team ====
Year	Champion	Points
2024	Harbor Springs	30
2025	Harbor Springs	53
2026	Harbor Springs	47

==== Individual ====
Year	Champion	School	Time
2024	Stefi Reskevics	Harbor Springs	19:53.54
2025	Brynne Schulte	Elk Rapids	19:16.31
2026	Hannah Muladore	Charlevoix	19:24.8

=== Regional Champions ===
Year	Champion	Division
2024	Harbor Springs	4

=== Final Appearances ===
Year	School	Place	Division
2024	Harbor Springs	4th	4
2025	Harbor Springs	21st	3
2025	Boyne City	26th	3
2026	Harbor Springs	14th	3

== Girls Golf ==
Includes information about each team's performances since the 2024 Fall season, the first season under the NSC. Note on MHSAA Golf: To qualify for the Finals, a team must place in the top three of their Regional. They do not need to strictly achieve 1st place. Note: Kingsley did not participate in the MHSAA Girls Golf postseason tournament from 2024-2026

=== Achievement History ===
Team	Conference Titles	Regional Titles	Final Appearances	State Titles	Best Finish
Elk Rapids	2	2	2	0	3rd
Harbor Springs	1	0	2	0	8th
Charlevoix	0	0	1	0	10th
Boyne City	0	0	0	0	
Cheboygan	0	0	0	0	
Grayling	0	0	0	0	
Kalkaska	0	0	0	0	
Kingsley	0	0	0	0	

=== Conference Champions ===
==== Team ====
Year	Champion
2024	Harbor Springs
2025	Elk Rapids
2026	Elk Rapids

==== Individual ====
Year	Champion	School
2024	Jessica Campbell	Grayling
2025	Sophie Lagattuta	Grayling
2026		

=== Regional Champions ===
Year	Champion	Division
2025	Elk Rapids	4
2026	Elk Rapids	4

=== Finals Appearances ===
Year	School	Place	Division
2024	Charlevoix	10th	4
2024	Harbor Springs	13th	4
2025	Elk Rapids	3rd	4
2025	Harbor Springs	8th	4
2026	Elk Rapids	3rd	4

== Girls Volleyball ==
Includes information about each team's performances since the 2024 Fall season, the first season under the NSC.

=== Achievement History ===
Team	Conference Record	Conference Titles	District Titles	Regional Titles	State Titles
Kingsley	21-0	3	3	2	1
Elk Rapids	17-4	0	0	0	0
Boyne City	14-7	0	1	0	0
Cheboygan	13-8	0	0	0	0
Grayling	6-15	0	0	0	0
Charlevoix	5-16	0	0	0	0
Harbor Springs	4-17	0	0	0	0
Kalkaska	4-17	0	0	0	0

=== Conference Champions ===
Year	Champion	Record
2024	Kingsley	7-0
2025	Kingsley	7-0
2026	Kingsley	7-0

=== District Champions ===
Year	Champion	Division
2024	Kingsley	2
2025	Kingsley	3
2026	Kingsley	2
2026	Boyne City	3

=== Regional Champions ===
Year	Champion	Division
2025	Kingsley	3
2026	Kingsley	2

=== Finals Appearances ===
Season	Round	NSC		Non-NSC		Site	Division	Ref
2025	Quarterfinal	Kingsley (54-4-1)	25-23-25-25	Traverse City St Francis (32-17-0)	23-25-19-15	West Senior High • Traverse City, MI	3	
2025	Semifinal	Kingsley (55-4-1)	17-25-25-8-17	Monroe St Mary Catholic Central (26-5-1)	25-19-23-25-15	Kellogg Arena • Battle Creek, MI	3	
2025	Final	Kingsley (56-4-1)	22-26-25-25	Kalamazoo Christian (30-11-3)	25-24-15-12	Kellogg Arena • Battle Creek, MI	3	
2026	Quarterfinal	Kingsley (50-6-1)	25-18-26-15	North Branch (42-9-3)	15-25-28-25	Shepherd High School • Shepherd, MI	2	

== Wrestling ==
Includes information about each team's performances since the 2025 Winter season, the first season under the NSC. Note: Elk Rapids and Harbor Springs do not field Wrestling teams.

=== Achievement History ===
Team	Conference Titles	District Titles	Regional Titles
Boyne City	1	1	0
Charlevoix	1	1	1
Kingsley	0	1	0
Kalkaska	0	1	0
Cheboygan	0	0	0
Grayling	0	0	0

=== Conference champions ===
==== Team ====
Year	Champion
2025	Charlevoix
2026	Boyne City

==== Individual ====
Year	106	113	120	126	132	138	144	150	157	165	175	190	215	285
2025	Andrew Betz	Gavin Holmes	Owen Lewicki	Gabriel Buyze-Prieto	Kalen Titus	Max Huspen	Bruyn Hauger	Collin Jess	Jordan Peters	Parker Grubb	Brady Warchol	Colton Goethals	Danny Bonamie	Luke Munger
2026	Mathieu Moore	Korbin Korpenkoskey	Peyton Frost	Evan Fradette	Alex Moore	Owen Lewicki	Deegan Anthony	Max Huspen	Collin Jess	Gage Miller	Isaiah Cosgrove	Ryan Glass	Sawyer Blaszczyk	Zeke Wright

=== District Champions ===
Year	Champion	Division
2025	Boyne City	3
2025	Kalkaska	3
2025	Charlevoix	4
2026	Kingsley	3

=== Regional Champions ===
Year	Champion	Division
2025	Charlevoix	4

=== Finals Appearances ===
Year	Round	NSC		Non-NSC		Site	Division	Ref
2025	Quarterfinal	(7) Charlevoix	9	(2) St Louis	65	Wings Event Center • Kalamazoo, MI	4	

=== State Champions ===
Year	Champion	School	Division	Weight Class
2026	Sawyer Blaszczyk	Charlevoix	4	285

== Girls Skiing ==
=== Conference Champions ===
Year	Champion
2025	Harbor Springs
2026	Harbor Springs

Team	Conference championships	Final appearances	State championships	Best finish
Harbor Springs	2	2	1	1st
Elk Rapids	0	2	0	5th
Charlevoix	0	0	0	
Boyne City	0	0	0	
Grayling	0	0	0	

=== Individual Champions ===
YEAR	Giant Slalom	YEAR	Slalom
2025	Drew Bowman, Harbor Springs	2025	Avery Kita, Lake Charlevoix
2026	Keeler Brainerd, Harbor Springs	2025	Grace Rowe, Great North Alpine

== Boys Skiing ==
=== Conference Champions ===
Year	Champion
2025	Great North Alpine
2026	Great North Alpine

Team	Conference championships	Final appearances	State championships	Best finish
Elk Rapids	2	2	0	2nd
Harbor Springs	0	0	0	3rd
Charlevoix	0	0	0	
Boyne City	0	0	0	
Grayling	0	0	0	

=== Individual Champions ===
YEAR	Giant Slalom	YEAR	Slalom
2025	Corbin Bogard, Great North Alpine	2025	Corbin Bogard, Great North Alpine
2026	Corbin Bogard, Great North Alpine	2026	Corbin Bogard, Great North Alpine

== Boys Basketball ==
Includes information about each team's performances since the 2025 Winter season, the first season under the NSC.

=== Achievement History ===
Team	Conference Record	Conference Titles	District Titles	Regional Titles
Elk Rapids	27-1	2	1	0
Harbor Springs	20-8	0	1	0
Cheboygan	18-10	0	1	0
Boyne City	15-13	0	1	0
Charlevoix	14-14	0	0	0
Kalkaska	7-21	0	0	0
Grayling	7-21	0	0	0
Kingsley	4-24	0	0	0

=== Conference Champions ===
Year	Champion	Record
2025	Elk Rapids	13-1
2026	Elk Rapids	14-0

=== District Champions ===
Year	Champion	Division
2025	Boyne City	2
2025	Harbor Springs	3
2026	Cheboygan	2
2026	Elk Rapids	3

== Girls Basketball ==
Includes information about each team's performances since the 2025 Winter season, the first season under the NSC.

=== Achievement History ===
Team	Conference Record	Conference Titles	District Titles	Regional Titles
Harbor Springs	26-2	1	2	0
Kingsley	24-4	1	0	0
Elk Rapids	19-9	0	0	0
Boyne City	17-11	0	0	0
Cheboygan	11-17	0	0	0
Grayling	7-21	0	0	0
Kalkaska	4-24	0	0	0
Charlevoix	4-24	0	0	0

=== Conference Champions ===
Year	Champion	Record
2025	Harbor Springs	14-0
2026	Kingsley	13-1

=== District Champions ===
Year	Champion	Division
2025	Harbor Springs	3
2026	Harbor Springs	3

== Boys Bowling ==
=== Conference Champions ===
Year	Champion	Record
2025	Elk Rapids	
2025	Elk Rapids & Cheboygan	10-1-1

== Girls Tennis ==
=== Conference Champions ===
Year	Champion
2025	Harbor Springs

== Boys Golf ==
Includes information about each team's performances since the 2025 Spring season, the first season under the NSC.

=== Achievement History ===
Team	Conference Titles	Final appearances	State Titles	Best finish
Charlevoix	1	1	1	1st
Elk Rapids	1	1	0	13th
Harbor Springs	0	1	0	6th
Boyne City	0	1	0	17th
Cheboygan	0	0	0	
Grayling	0	0	0	
Kalkaska	0	0	0	
Kingsley	0	0	0	

=== Conference Champions ===
==== Team ====
Year	Champion
2025	Elk Rapids
2026	Charlevoix

==== Individual ====
Year	Champion	School
2025	Bryce Boss	Charlevoix
2026	Bryce Boss	Charlevoix

=== Regional Champions ===
Year	Champion	Division
2026	Elk Rapids	3
2026	Charlevoix	4

=== State Finals Appearances ===
Year	School	Place	Division
2026	Elk Rapids	13th	3
2026	Boyne City	17th	3
2026	Charlevoix	1st	4
2026	Harbor Springs	6th	4

== Girls Soccer ==
Includes information about each team's performances since the 2025 Spring season, the first season under the NSC. Note: Kalkaska did not participate in the MHSAA Girls Soccer postseason tournament in 2025.

=== Achievement History ===
Team	Conference Record	Conference Titles	District Titles	Regional Titles
Harbor Springs	22-0-1	2	1	1
Elk Rapids	22-3-1	0	0	0
Cheboygan	13-7-4	0	0	0
Boyne City	10-9-5	0	1	0
Charlevoix	7-14-3	0	0	0
Kingsley	6-15-5	0	0	0
Grayling	3-21-1	0	0	0
Kalkaska	0-14-0	0	0	0

=== Conference Champions ===
Year	Champion	Record
2025	Harbor Springs	12-0-0
2026	Harbor Springs	10-0-1

=== District Champions ===
Year	Champion	Division
2025	Boyne City	3
2026	Harbor Springs	4

=== Regional Champions ===
Year	Champion	Division
2026	Harbor Springs	4

== Softball ==
Includes information about each team's performances since the 2025 Spring season, the first season under the NSC.

=== Achievement History ===
Team	Conference Record	Conference Titles	District Titles	Regional Titles
Elk Rapids	23-5	1	0	0
Boyne City	23-5	1	1	1
Kingsley	18-9	0	1	0
Cheboygan	16-10	0	0	0
Kalkaska	13-15	0	0	0
Grayling	10-18	0	1	0
Harbor Springs	4-22	0	1	0
Charlevoix	2-26	0	0	0

=== Conference Champions ===
Year	Champion	Record
2025	Elk Rapids	13-1
2026	Boyne City	13-1

=== District Champions ===
Year	Champion	Division
2025	Grayling	3
2025	Kingsley	3
2025	Harbor Springs	4
2026	Boyne City	3

=== Regional Champions ===
Year	Champion	Division
2026	Boyne City	3

=== Finals Appearances ===
Year	Round	NSC		Non-NSC		Site	Division
2026	Quarterfinal	Boyne City (29-11)	2	Evart (42-0)	6	Ferris State University • Big Rapids, MI	3

== Baseball ==
Includes information about each team's performances since the 2025 Spring season, the first season under the NSC.

=== Achievement History ===
Team	Conference Record	Conference Titles	District Titles	Regional Titles
Kingsley	22-6	0	0	0
Elk Rapids	21-7	1	1	0
Boyne City	18-10	0	0	0
Harbor Springs	17-11	1	1	0
Kalkaska	16-12	1	0	0
Charlevoix	8-20	0	0	0
Cheboygan	5-23	0	0	0
Grayling	5-23	0	0	0

=== Conference Champions ===
Year	Champion	Record
2025	Elk Rapids	13-1
2026	Kalkaska & Harbor Springs	12-2

=== District Champions ===
Year	Champion	Division
2025	Elk Rapids	3
2026	Harbor Springs	3

== Girls Track & Field ==
Includes information about each team's performances since the 2025 Spring season, the first season under the NSC. Note: As of the current MHSAA Track & Field postseason tournament structure, a team cannot qualify for the State Finals. To score points at the Finals, individuals alone must qualify and place high enough to earn points. As a result, many schools will make appearances at the Finals, but few score points, and therefore not given places.

=== Achievement History ===
Team	Conference Titles	Regional Titles	Best Finish
Kingsley	2	0	5th
Harbor Springs	0	1	45th
Elk Rapids	0	1	55th
Boyne City	0	0	
Charlevoix	0	0	
Cheboygan	0	0	
Grayling	0	0	
Kalkaska	0	0	

=== Conference Champions ===
==== Team ====
Year	Champion	Points
2025	Kingsley	204.5
2026	Kingsley	177

==== Individual ====
Year	100M	Time	200M	Time	400M	Time	800M	Time	1600M	Time	3200M	Time	110M H	Time	300M H	Time
2025	Alivia Dear	13.02	Norah Galton	26.95	Hunter Shellenbarger	1:02.04	Delaney Little	2:29.64	Brynn Schulte	5:34.27	Adrianna Soria	12:37.10	Norah Galton	16.06	Norah Galton	46.51
2026	Alivia Dear	12.97	Alivia Dear	26.97	Maya Duncombe	1:01.90	Anna Pray	2:30.81	Aaliyah Hillier	5:51.51	Hailee Bertels	12:52.80	Brooke Fluty	16.92	Brooke Fluty	51.35

Year	4 X 100M	Time	4 X 200M	Time	4 X 400M	Time	4 X 800M	Time
2025	Kingsley	52.53	Harbor Springs	1:51.54	Elk Rapids	4:24.14	Harbor Springs	10:47.75
2026	Kingsley	51.19	Harbor Springs	1:50.54	Grayling	4:23.55	Boyne City	10:56.46

Year	Shot Put	Distance	Discus	Distance	High Jump	Height	Long Jump	Distance	Pole Vault	Height
2025	Adalene Chambers	35'10"	Adalene Chambers	113'10"	Delaney Case	5'0"	Alivia Dear	15'5"	Isabelle Seitz	8'0"
2026	Emily Bott	33'10"	Emily Bott	108'5"	Cambrynne Giem	4'10"	Emilee Robinson	15'1"	Isabelle Seitz	9'0"

=== Regional Champions ===
Year	Champion	Division
2025	Elk Rapids	3
2025	Harbor Springs	4

=== State Champions ===
Year	Champion	School	Event	Time/Distance	Division
2025	Dear, Galton, McKinley, Robinson	Kingsley	400m Relay	49.38	3

== Boys Track & Field ==
Includes information about each team's performances since the 2025 Spring season, the first season under the NSC. Note: As of the current MHSAA Track & Field postseason tournament structure, a team cannot qualify for the State Finals. To score points at the Finals, individuals alone must qualify and place high enough to earn points. As a result, many schools will make appearances at the Finals, but few score points, and therefore not given places.

=== Achievement History ===
Team	Conference Titles	Regional Titles	Best Finish
Charlevoix	2	1	6th
Elk Rapids	0	0	2nd
Cheboygan	0	0	17th
Harbor Springs	0	0	23rd
Kingsley	0	0	32nd
Boyne City	0	0	
Grayling	0	0	
Kalkaska	0	0	

=== Conference Champions ===
==== Team ====
Year	Champion	Points
2025	Charlevoix	179.5
2026	Charlevoix	174.5

==== Individual ====
Year	100M	Time	200M	Time	400M	Time	800M	Time	1600M	Time	3200M	Time	110M H	Time	300M H	Time
2025	Tyler Unterbrink	11.18	Tyler Unterbrink	22.97	Brody Horrigan	51.91	Hunter Eaton	2:02.84	Hunter Eaton	4:36.42	Hunter Eaton	9:47.96	Max Ward	14.80	Max Ward	38.93
2026	Garrett Godden	11.38	Garrett Godden	22.28	Garrett Godden	49.42	Tristan Hernandez	2:02.44	Hunter Eaton	4:28.62	Hunter Eaton	9:57.28	Aidan Hunt	16.23	Landon Baas	41.93

Year	4 X 100M	Time	4 X 200M	Time	4 X 400M	Time	4 X 800M	Time
2025	Kingsley	44.61	Charlevoix	1:34.44	Elk Rapids	3:32.08	Grayling	8:40.52
2026	Kalkaska	44.87	Charlevoix	1:33.74	Elk Rapids	3:30.35	Elk Rapids	8:47.38

Year	Shot Put	Distance	Discus	Distance	High Jump	Height	Long Jump	Distance	Pole Vault	Height
2025	Lucas Sidlaukas	49'0"	Chase Bott	162'3"	Chase Bott	6'0"	Gavin Lewis	20'0.5"	Korbin Bedford	11'6"
2026	Andrew Grogan	50'5"	Austin Tonn	127'4"	Jason McNamara	6'0"	Gavin Lewis	21'7.25"	Collin Jess	11'6"

=== Regional Champions ===
Year	Champion	Division
2026	Charlevoix	3

=== State Champions ===
Year	Champion	School	Event	Time/Distance	Division
2025	Hunter Eaton	Charlevoix	3200m	9:33.09	3
2026	Hunter Eaton	Charlevoix	1600m	4:16.08	3
2026	Liggett, Prabhaker, Hamilton, Godden	Elk Rapids	1600m Relay	3:23.58	3
