= Northern Michigan Football League =

- Founded: 2014
- Division: MHSAA
- No. of teams: 9
- Region: Northern Michigan

Locations
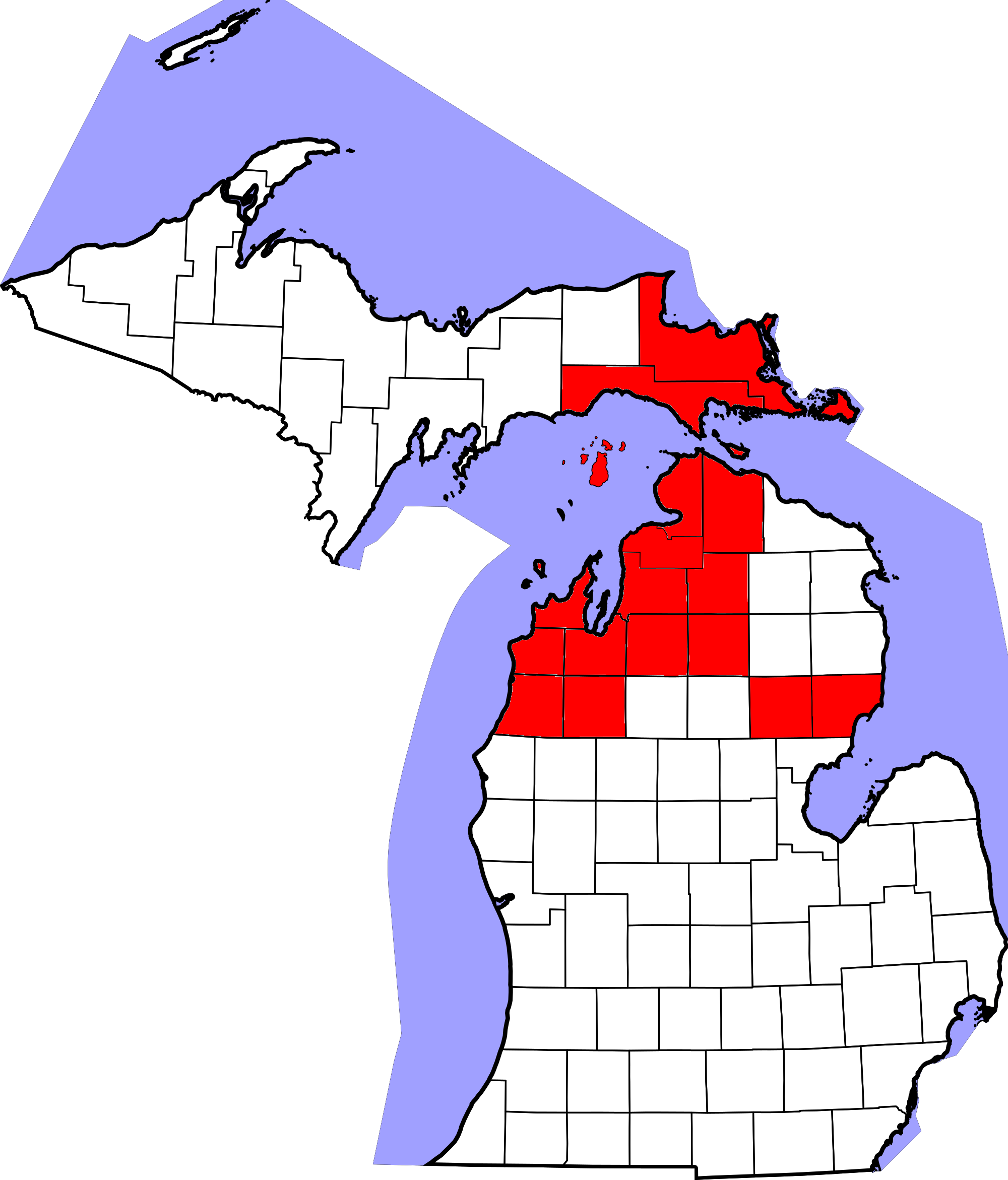

The Northern Michigan Football League is an interscholastic athletic conference affiliated with the Michigan High School Athletic Association. It is located in Northern Michigan and contains nine teams that encompasses seven counties: Antrim, Benzie, Charlevoix, Emmet, Iosco, Leelanau, and Otsego.

== History ==
The League formed from the merger of the Lake Michigan Conference and the Northwest Conference, for football only. The schools were then split up based on enrollment and competitiveness, with the larger schools forming the Legends Division, and the smaller ones forming the Legacy Division. Mesick, who was a member of the Northwest Conference, declined to join the league, leaving the Legacy Division with one school less than the Legend Division. Before the 2015 season, it was announced that the six members of the Ski Valley Conference not dropping to Eight-man Football as well as Cheboygan, Onekema and Traverse City Christian High Schools would join the league during the 2016 season, causing the league to expand to three divisions; the Leaders, Legends, and Legacy divisions. The league is also considering the applications of several other schools, and the possibility of further divisions to help with travel costs. On October 6, 2015, Traverse City Christian announced that it would not be joining the NMFL and that Mesick would be replacing them in the conference on a two-year trial basis.

For the 2017 season, more changes will be happening, as four schools will be making the move to eight-man football. In the last few months of 2016, Central Lake, Mesick, Onekama, and Suttons Bay all announced moves to the eight-man game. However, for the 2018 season, Newberry, from the former Mid Eastern Football Conference, was brought into the league. This did not last long, however, as for the 2019 season, Newberry, along with Gaylord St. Mary announced their own move to the 8 man game as well. Starting in 2020, the league will welcome Sault Ste. Marie and West Branch-Ogemaw Heights, who both previously were independent. In corresponding moved Kalkaska and Boyne city will move from the Legends Division to the Leaders Division, and Frankfort will move from the Leaders Division to the Legacy Division. This aligns the league, with the exception of Traverse City St. Francis, to divisions based on enrollment sizes, with the Legends being the largest, Leaders being the middle, and Legacy being the smallest schools.

Effective 2021, the NMFL added 2 new schools, Tawas & Oscoda. Tawas was added to the largest division, Legends, while Oscoda was added to the smallest division, Legacy. Former North Star League foes Rogers City & Lincoln-Alcona were both originally set the join the Legacy Division, but opted instead to drop to 8-Man Football.

In September 2021, following the departure of the two Traverse City high schools to the Saginaw Valley League, the four remaining Big North Conference high schools: Alpena, Gaylord, Cadillac, and Petoskey, were denied entry into the league, despite approval of the conferences athletic directors. The eight superintendents of the then Legends Division declined the addition of the four schools, Citing how the league has grown fast and changed so much in the last six years it might be best to slow down before overhauling the league. The addition of the four schools would have seen the creation of a new 4th division, the Liberty Division and would have included the 6 biggest schools, Alpena, Petoskey, Gaylord, Cadillac, Sault Ste. Marie, and Cheboygan. The following 18 teams would have been divided into 3 equal divisions of 6 teams based on size and success. Instead, the conference kept its 3 division format, but saw Tawas moved to the middle Leaders division and Glen Lake moved to the smaller Legacy Division.

In September 2022 it was announced that effective Fall 2023, the Big North Conference would add Marquette, Escanaba and NMFL member, Sault Ste. Marie, as football members only. Also in 2023, St. Ignace left the conference and moved to 8-man football, while Kalkaska left as well to become an 11-man football independent. With these changes, Benzie Central and Oscoda moved to the middle Leaders division from the larger Legends and smaller Legacy divisions respectively, while Mancelona moved from the Leaders division to the Legacy division

In October 2025, it was announced that the Northern Shores Conference would sponsor football starting in the 2026 season. Harbor Springs opted to remain in the NMFL, while Boyne City, Charlevoix, Cheboygan, Elk Rapids, Grayling, and Kingsley would depart after the 2025 season. Traverse City St. Francis will also depart after the 2025 season, leaving the NMFL as a 9-team league with no divisions. The nine schools will play an eight-game conference schedule, with one team playing a non-league game each week of the season.

== Member schools ==
=== Current members ===
Team	School	Location	County	Joined	Type	Enrollment	All-Sports Conference
Benzie Central Huskies	Benzie Central	Benzonia Township	Benzie	2014	Public	295	Northwest Conference
East Jordan Red Devils	East Jordan	East Jordan	Charlevoix	2014	Public	208	Ski-Valley Conference
Frankfort Panthers	Frankfort	Frankfort	Benzie	2014	Public	131	Northwest Conference
Maple City Glen Lake Lakers	Maple City–Glen Lake	Kasson Township	Leelanau	2014	Public	200	Northwest Conference
Harbor Springs Rams	Harbor Springs	Harbor Springs	Emmet	2014	Public	365 (Note: Co-Op with Harbor Light Christian (58 Students) & St. Michael Academy (48 Students))	Northern Shores Conference
Johannesburg-Lewiston Cardinals	Johannesburg-Lewiston	Charlton Township	Otsego	2016	Public	200	Ski Valley Conference
Mancelona Ironmen	Mancelona	Mancelona Township	Antrim	2016	Public	233	Ski Valley Conference
Oscoda Owls	Oscoda	Au Sable Township	Iosco	2021	Public	282	North Star League
Tawas Braves	Tawas Area	Tawas Township	Iosco	2021	Public	338	Independent

=== Former members ===
Team	School	Location	County	Joined	Departed	Enrollment	Type	Current Conference
Boyne City Ramblers	Boyne City	Boyne City	Charlevoix	2014	2026	373	Public	Northern Shores Conference
Central Lake Trojans	Central Lake	Central Lake	Antrim	2016	2017	84	Public	Ski Valley Conference (8-Man)
Charlevoix Rayders	Charlevoix	Marion Township	Charlevoix	2014	2026	258	Public	Northern Shores Conference
Cheboygan Chiefs	Cheboygan	Cheboygan	Cheboygan	2016	2026	441	Public	Northern Shores Conference
Elk Rapids Elks	Elk Rapids	Elk Rapids	Antrim	2014	2026	351	Public	Northern Shores Conference
Gaylord St. Mary Snowbirds	Gaylord St. Mary	Gaylord	Otsego	2016	2019	69	Private	Ski Valley Conference (8-Man)
Grayling Vikings	Grayling	Frederic Township	Crawford	2014	2026	448	Public	Northern Shores Conference
Indian River Inland Lakes Bulldogs	Inland Lakes	Tuscarora Township	Cheboygan	2016	2020	177	Public	Ski Valley Conference (8-Man)
Kalkaska Blazers	Kalkaska	Kalkaska	Kalkaska	2014	2023	441	Public	Northern Shores Conference
Kingsley Stags	Kingsley	Kingsley	Grand Traverse	2014	2026	385	Public	Northern Shores Conference
Mesick Bulldogs	Mesick	Mesick	Wexford	2016	2017	197	Public	West Michigan 8-Man Football League
Newberry Indians	Newberry	Newberry	Luce	2018	2019	171	Public	Great Lakes 8-Man Conference - East
Ogemaw Heights Falcons	West Branch–Ogemaw Heights	West Branch Township	Ogemaw	2020	2024	556	Public	Jack Pine Conference
Onekama Portagers	Onekama	Onekama	Manistee	2016	2017	99	Public	West Michigan 8-Man Football League
Sault Ste. Marie Blue Devils	Sault Area	Sault Ste. Marie	Chippewa	2020	2023	884	Public	Big North Conference
St. Francis Gladiators	Traverse City–St. Francis	Traverse City	Grand Traverse	2014	2026	345	Private	Independent (11-Man)
St. Ignace Saints	Saint Ignace	St. Ignace Township	Mackinac	2016	2023	201	Public	Great Lakes 8-Man Conference - East
Suttons Bay Norsemen	Suttons Bay	Suttons Bay	Leelanau	2014	2017	132	Public	West Michigan 8-Man Football League

== Football Champions ==
Year	NMFL I	NMFL II	
2014	Boyne City 12-1 (6–0)	Suttons Bay 9-2 (5–0)	
Year	Legends	Leaders	
2015	St. Francis 12-1 (6–0)	Frankfort 9-3 (5–0)	
Year	Legends	Leaders	Legacy
2016	St. Francis 11-1 (6–0)	Frankfort 11-1 (5–0)	St. Ignace 11-2 (6–0)
2017	Boyne City 9-1 (7–0)	Maple City Glen Lake 7-3 (5–0)	Gaylord St. Mary 10-1 (5–0)
2018	St. Francis 12-1 (6–0)	Maple City Glen Lake 5-5 (4–0)	Johannesburg-Lewiston 9-2 (6–0)
2019	Kingsley 12-1 (6–0)	Maple City Glen Lake 12-2 (4–0)	Johannesburg-Lewiston 10-1 (4–0)
2020	Kingsley 8-1 (6–0)	Charlevoix 8-1 (5–0)	Johannesburg-Lewiston 10-1 (4–0)
2021	St. Francis 12-1 (7–0)	Boyne City 9-2 (5–0)	East Jordan 6-3 (5–0)
2022	St. Francis 13-1 (6–0)	Boyne City 9-1 (5–0)	St. Ignace 7-3 (6–0)
2023	Ogemaw Heights 9-2 (4–0)	Charlevoix 8-2 (5–0)	East Jordan 8-2 (5–0)
2024	Boyne City 7-2 (3–1), Kingsley 7-2 (3–1), St. Francis 6-3 (3–1)	Charlevoix 6-3 (4–0)	Glen Lake 8-1 (5–0)
2025	St. Francis 7-3 (3-0)	Charlevoix 8-2 (4–0)	Glen Lake 9-2 (5–0)

== State Championship Appearances ==
Season	NMFL		Non-NMFL		Site	Division
2016	Maple City Glen Lake (12–2)	14	Jackson Lumen Christi (11–3)	26	Ford Field • Detroit, MI	6
2019	Maple City Glen Lake (12–2)	0	Monroe Saint Mary Catholic (12–1)	7	Ford Field • Detroit, MI	6
2020	St. Francis (9–3)	35	New Lothrop (11–0)	42	Ford Field • Detroit, MI	7
2022	St. Francis (13–1)	12	Jackson Lumen Christi (11–3)	15	Ford Field • Detroit, MI	7
2023	Kingsley (12–2)	38	Almont (12–2)	24	Ford Field • Detroit, MI	6
2025	Kingsley (11–3)	14	Jackson Lumen Christi (11–3)	28	Ford Field • Detroit, MI	6

== NMFL Records ==
School	Seasons	Legend	Leader	Legacy	Overall	%	Playoffs	Playoff Record	Districts	Regionals	Championships
Benzie Central Huskies	12	10-39	7-6		17-45	.274	4	1-4	0	0	0
Boyne City Ramblers	12	33-12	16-4		49-16	.754	10	11-10	2	2	0
Central Lake Trojans	1			1-5	1-5	.168	0	0-0	0	0	0
Charlevoix Rayders	12		40-14		40-14	.741	9	5-9	0	0	0
Cheboygan Chiefs	10	14-41			14-41	.256	1	0-1	0	0	0
East Jordan Red Devils	12		0-10	27-24	27-34	.443	6	3-6	0	0	0
Elk Rapids Elks	12	9-16	15-21		24-37	.393	5	0-5	0	0	0
Frankfort Panthers	12		18-8	20-10	38-18	.679	11	7-11	3	0	0
Gaylord St. Mary Snowbirds	3			10-7	10-7	.588	2	1-2	0	0	0
Grayling Vikings	12	27-40			27-40	.403	6	5-6	1	1	0
Harbor Springs Rams	12		4-6	22-29	26-35	.426	5	1-5	0	0	0
Indian River Inland Lakes Bulldogs	4			2-19	2-19	.095	0	0-0	0	0	0
Johannesburg-Lewiston Cardinals	10			24-27	24-27	.470	4	6-4	1	1	0
Kalkaska Blazers	9	5-20	7-17		12-37	.245	2	0-2	0	0	0
Kingsley Stags	12	46-22			46-22	.677	8	19-7	6	3	1
Mancelona Ironmen	10		8-23	8-9	16-32	.333	4	1-4	0	0	0
Maple City Glen Lake Lakers	12	4-8	21-4	16-5	41-17	.701	10	13-10	3	2	0
Mesick Bulldogs	1		0-5		0-5	.000	1	0-0	0	0	0
Newberry Indians	1			3-3	3-3	.500	1	0-0	0	0	0
Ogemaw Heights Falcons	4	12-9			12-9	.571	3	1-3	0	0	0
Onekama Portagers	1		2-3		2-3	.400	1	0-1	0	0	0
Oscoda Owls	5		5-6	5-6	10-12	.455	0	0-0	0	0	0
Sault Ste. Marie Blue Devils	3	10-7			10-7	.588	1	2-1	0	0	0
St. Francis Gladiators	12	58-8			58-8	.879	12	29-12	9	6	0
St. Ignace Saints	7			20-16	20-16	.557	4	3-4	1	0	0
Suttons Bay Norsemen	3		6-4		6-4	.600	1	1-1	0	0	0
Tawas Braves	5		1-17	0-6	1-23	.042	0	0-0	0	0	0

== Membership Timeline ==
Legends Leaders Legacy
