= Elk Rapids Schools =

School district in Michigan

Address
- 308 Meguzee Point Road Elk Rapids, Antrim County, Michigan, 49629; United States
- Coordinates: 44°53′45″N 85°24′38″W

District information
- Type: Public school district
- Motto: Where excellence is a tradition!
- Grades: Pre-Kindergarten-12
- President: Jennifer Brown
- Superintendent: Bryan McKenna
- Schools: 4
- Budget: $31,822,000 2022-2023 expenditures
- NCES District ID: 2613050

Students and staff
- Students: 949 (2024-2025)
- Teachers: 53.11 (on an FTE basis) (2024-2025)
- Staff: 123.7 FTE (2024-2025)
- Student–teacher ratio: 17.87 (2024-2025)
- District mascot: Elk
- Colors: Orange and Black

Other information
- Website: www.erschools.com

Elk Rapids Schools is a public school district in Northern Michigan. In Antrim County, it serves Elk Rapids, Elk Rapids Township, Milton Township, and part of Torch Lake Township. In Kalkaska County, it serves parts of Clearwater Township. In Grand Traverse County, it serves parts of the townships of Acme and Whitewater. It is part of the intermediate school district Northwest Education Services.

== History ==
The cornerstone of the current high school was laid on September 5, 1970 by members of the Grand Lodge of Free and Accepted Masons of Michigan. As part of the bond issue passed in November 2020, additions were built at the high school and much of Cherryland Middle School was rebuilt.

Because of declining enrollment and the corresponding drop in funding revenue, in 2023 the district considered turning Mill Creek Elementary into a public charter school. Currently, the school is a charter school known as Mill Creek Academy.

== Schools ==
Schools in Elk Rapids Schools district
School	Address	Notes
Elk Rapids High School	308 Meguzee Point Rd., Elk Rapids	Grades 9-12
Cherryland Middle School	707 E. Third Street, Elk Rapids	Grades 6-8
Lakeland Elementary School	616 Buckley Street, Elk Rapids	Grades PreK-5
Sunrise Academy	308 Meguzee Point Rd., Elk Rapids	Alternative high school

== Additional facilities ==
As a member of Northwest Education Services, Elk Rapids students have access to Northwest Educational Services facilities. Some high school students attend the Northwest Education Services Career Tech, a career and technical education school located in Traverse City.
