= Adam Trautman =

American football player (born 1997)

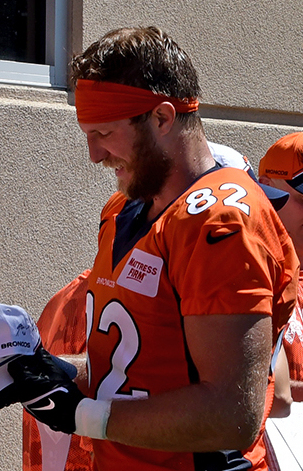
- Trautman with the Denver Broncos in 2023

No. 82 – Denver Broncos
- Position: Tight end
- Roster status: Active

Personal information
- Born: February 5, 1997 (age 29); Williamsburg, Michigan, U.S.
- Listed height: 6 ft 5 in (1.96 m)
- Listed weight: 253 lb (115 kg)

Career information
- High school: Elk Rapids (Elk Rapids, Michigan)
- College: Dayton (2015–2019)
- NFL draft: 2020: 3rd round, 105th overall pick

Career history
- New Orleans Saints (2020–2022); Denver Broncos (2023–present)

Awards and highlights
- PFL Offensive Player of the Year (2019); First-team All-PFL (2019); 2× Second-team All-PFL (2017, 2018)

Career NFL statistics as of 2025
- Receptions: 115
- Receiving yards: 1,228
- Receiving touchdowns: 10
- Stats at Pro Football Reference

Adam Trautman (born February 5, 1997) is an American professional football tight end for the Denver Broncos of the National Football League (NFL). He played college football for the Dayton Flyers and was selected by the New Orleans Saints in the third round of the 2020 NFL draft. Prior to the 2023 season, he was traded to the Broncos, reuniting with former Saints head coach Sean Payton.

== Early life ==
Trautman grew up in Williamsburg, Michigan and attended Elk Rapids High School, where he played basketball and football and was an All-County selection in both sports. Trautman set every major school passing record and was named the Lake Michigan Conference Player of the Year as a senior.

== College career ==
Trautman redshirted in his true freshman season at the University of Dayton, as he changed positions from quarterback to tight end. As a redshirt freshman, he caught 24 passes for 238 yards and three touchdowns. He had 43 receptions for 537 yards and five touchdowns and was named second-team All-Pioneer Football League in his sophomore season. As a junior, Trautman led the team with 41 receptions, 604 yards and nine touchdowns and was again named second-team All-PFL. As a Senior, he was named the PFL Offensive Player of the Year and first-team All-PFL after catching 70 passes for 916 yards and 14 touchdowns. He finished his collegiate career with 171 receptions for 2,295 yards and 31 touchdowns. Trautman played in the 2020 Senior Bowl, catching two passes. Trautman has a degree in Electrical Engineering from University of Dayton

== Professional career ==
Pre-draft measurables
Height	Weight	Arm length	Hand span	Wingspan	40-yard dash	10-yard split	20-yard split	20-yard shuttle	Three-cone drill	Vertical jump	Broad jump	Bench press
6 ft 5 in (1.96 m)	255 lb (116 kg)	32 5/8 in (0.83 m)	9 1/2 in (0.24 m)	6 ft 6 in (1.98 m)	4.80 s	1.57 s	2.76 s	4.27 s	6.78 s	34.5 in (0.88 m)	9 ft 6 in (2.90 m)	18 reps
All values from NFL Combine

=== New Orleans Saints ===
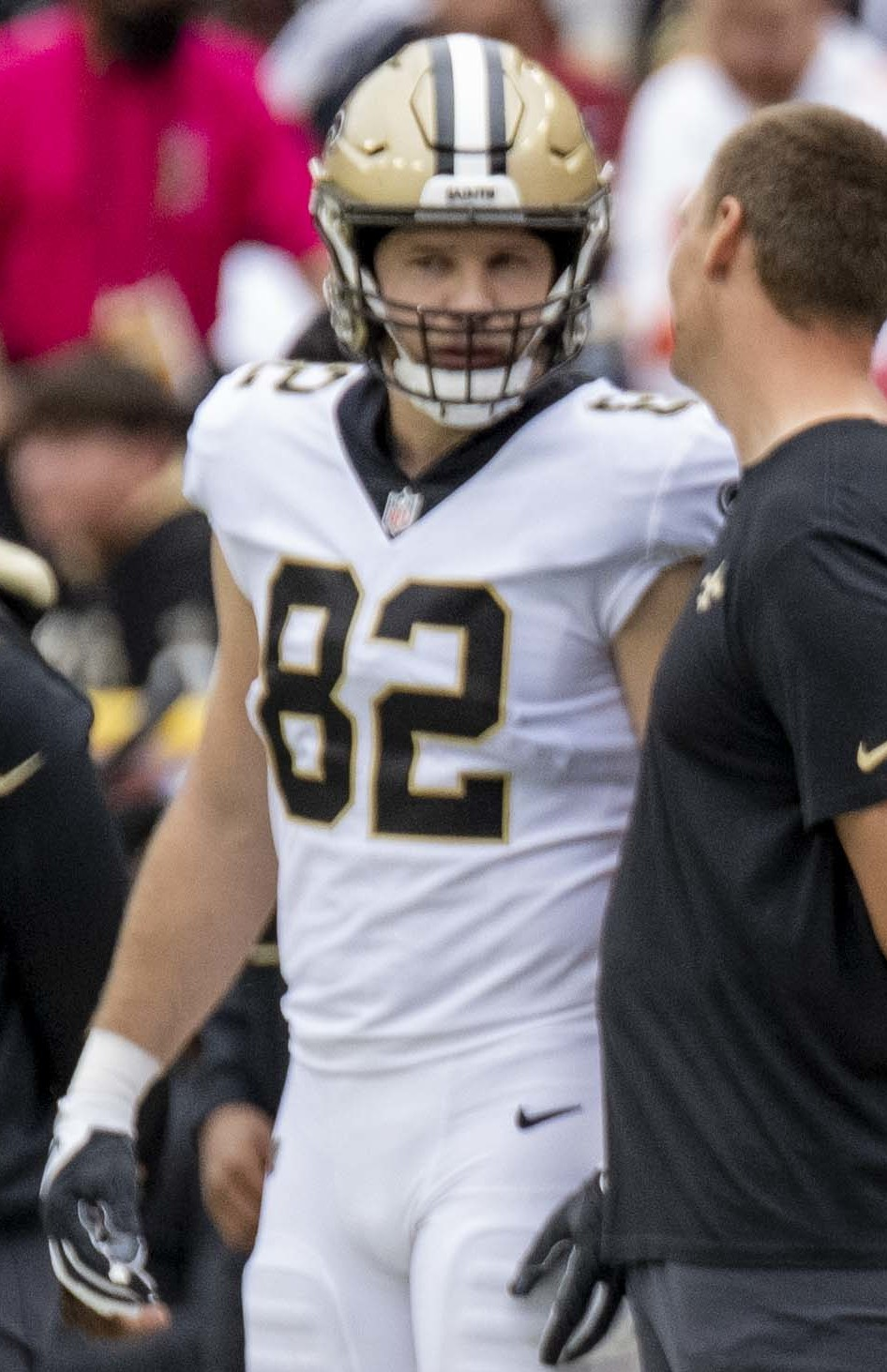
Trautman with the New Orleans Saints in 2021

Trautman was drafted by the New Orleans Saints in the third round with the 105th overall pick of the 2020 NFL draft. He was the first Dayton football player to be drafted since Bill Westbeld in 1977. Trautman made his NFL debut on September 13, 2020, in the season opener against the Tampa Bay Buccaneers, becoming the first Dayton player to appear in an NFL game in 45 years. He caught a 17-yard pass from Drew Brees for his first career reception on September 21, 2020, on Monday Night Football in a 34–24 loss to the Las Vegas Raiders. In Week 9, against the Buccaneers, he had three receptions for 39 yards and his first professional touchdown reception in the 38–3 victory. In a humorous incident, the Buccaneers were unable to find a picture of Trautman to use on their scoring display, and instead used a picture of then-Rams quarterback Jared Goff. He finished his rookie season with 15 receptions on 16 targets for 171 yards and one touchdown and was rated the best rookie tight end by Pro Football Focus, who also rated him the best run-blocking tight end in the NFL. Trautman entered the 2021 season as the starting tight end for the Saints after the team released Jared Cook in the offseason. He was placed on injured reserve on November 23, 2021. He was activated on December 18. In the 2021 season, he finished with 27 receptions for 263 yards and two touchdowns. In the 2022 season, he finished with 18 receptions for 207 yards and one touchdown.

=== Denver Broncos ===
On April 29, 2023, Trautman was traded from the Saints, along with the 257th pick of the 2023 NFL draft, to the Denver Broncos in exchange for the 195th pick of the draft. He was the Broncos starting tight end throughout the season, playing all 17 games with 12 starts while recording 22 catches for 204 yards and three touchdowns.

On March 13, 2024, Trautman signed a two-year contract extension with the Broncos.

On March 8, 2026, the Broncos signed Trautman to a three-year, $17 million extension.

== NFL career statistics ==
Legend
**Bold**	Career high

=== Regular season ===
Year	Team	Games		Receiving					Fumbles	
Year	Team	GP	GS	Rec	Yds	Avg	Lng	TD	Fum	Lost
2020	NO	15	6	15	171	11.4	**41**	1	0	0
2021	NO	13	10	**27**	**263**	9.7	32	2	**1**	**1**
2022	NO	15	12	18	207	11.5	22	1	0	0
2023	DEN	17	12	22	204	9.3	24	**3**	0	0
2024	DEN	17	14	13	188	**14.5**	37	2	0	0
2025	DEN	17	12	20	195	9.8	26	1	0	0
Career		94	66	115	1228	10.7	41	10	1	1

=== Postseason ===
Year	Team	Games		Receiving					Fumbles	
Year	Team	GP	GS	Rec	Yds	Avg	Lng	TD	Fum	Lost
2020	NO	2	0	**1**	**4**	**4.0**	**4**	0	0	0
2024	DEN	1	1	**1**	2	2.0	2	0	0	0
2025	DEN	2	1	0	0	0.0	0	0	0	0
Career		5	2	2	6	3.0	4	0	0	0
