= Cheboygan High School =

Public high school in Michigan, United States

Location
- 801 West Lincoln Avenue; Cheboygan, Michigan 49721; United States
- Coordinates: 45°37′58″N 84°29′42″W

Information
- Type: Public high school
- School district: Cheboygan Area Schools
- Superintendent: Spencer Byrd
- Principal: Marty Mix
- Teaching staff: 34.33 (on an FTE basis)
- Grades: 8–12
- Enrollment: 580 (2023–2024)
- Student to teacher ratio: 16.89
- Colors: Orange; Black
- Athletics conference: Northern Shores Conference; Northern Michigan Football League
- Team name: Chiefs
- Yearbook: Chief
- Website: cashs.chebschools.org

Cheboygan High School (CHS) is a public, coeducational secondary school in Cheboygan, Michigan. It is the sole high school serving the Cheboygan Area Schools district.

== Demographics ==
The demographic breakdown of the 659 students enrolled in 2021-22 was:

- Male – 51.0%
- Female – 49.0%
- American Indian/Alaska Native – 1.5%
- Black – 0.6%
- Hispanic – 1.2%
- White – 85.6%
- Multiracial – 11.1%

Additionally, 346 students (52.5%) were eligible for reduced-price or free lunch.
