= Kingsley High School (Michigan) =

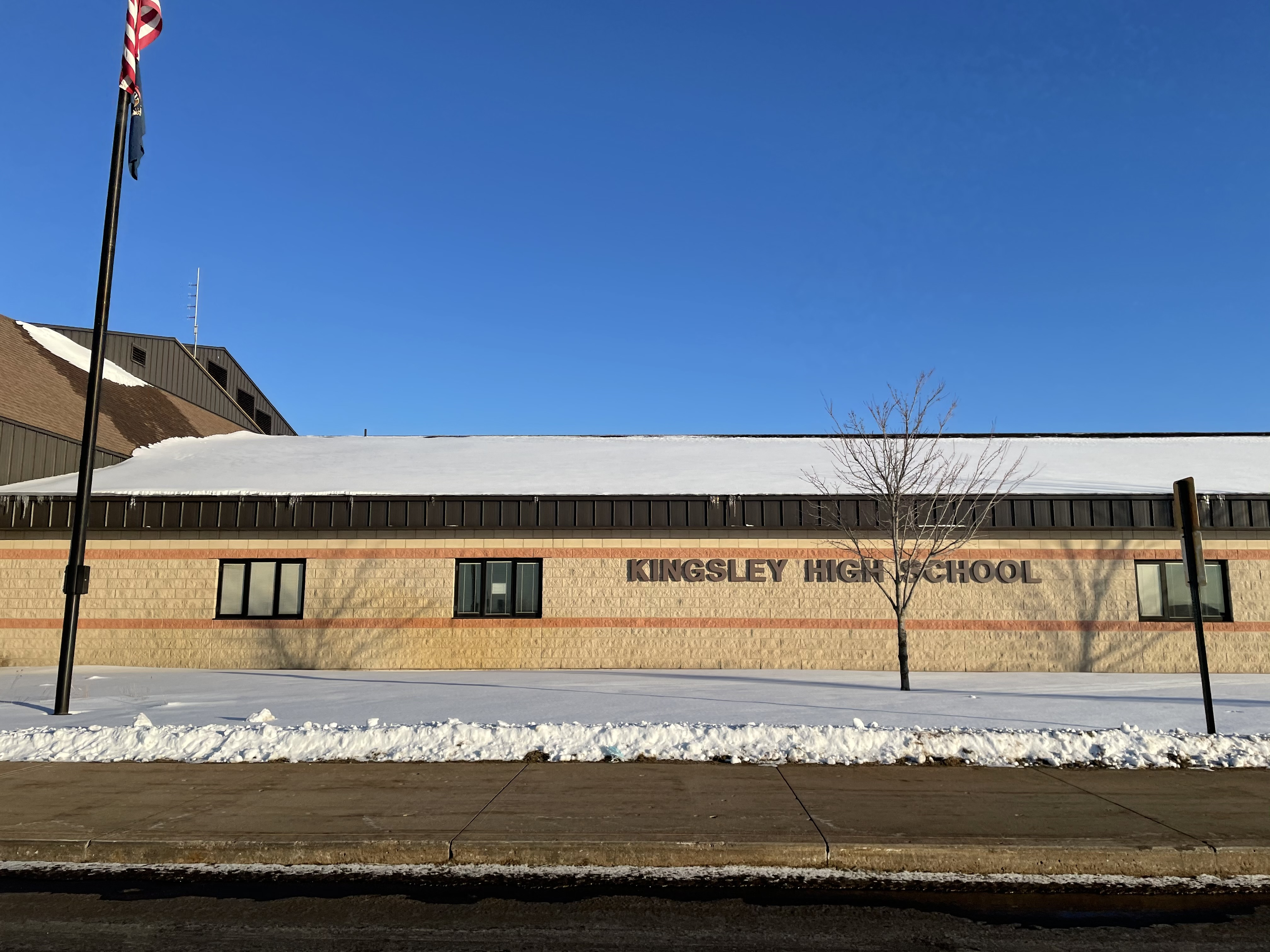

Location
- 7475 Kingsley Road; Kingsley, Michigan 49649; United States; 44°34′44″N 85°31′58″W

Information
- Type: Public high school
- Established: 2001 (Current Site)
- School district: Kingsley Area Schools
- Superintendent: Josh Rothwell
- Principal: Cody Wagatha
- Teaching staff: 25.58 (on an FTE basis)
- Grades: 9–12
- Enrollment: 401 (2024-2025)
- Student to teacher ratio: 15.68
- Campus type: Rural
- Colors: Orange; Black; White
- Athletics conference: Northern Shores Conference; Northern Michigan Football League
- Team name: Stags
- Rival: Glen Lake Community School; St. Francis High School
- Yearbook: The Stag
- Feeder schools: Kingsley Elementary School; Kingsley Middle School
- Website: www.kingsleyschools.org/kingsley-high-school

Kingsley High School (KHS) is a public high school in Kingsley, Michigan. KHS is the sole high school in the Kingsley Area Schools District, which serves southern Grand Traverse County. As of 2026, the school's interim principal is Cody Wagatha. The current building was built in 2001.

== Demographics ==
The demographic breakdown of the 500 students enrolled in 2021-22 was:

- Male - 51%
- Female - 49%
- Native American/Alaskan - 0.6%
- Asian - 0.8%
- Black - 1.4%
- Hispanic - 2.6%
- Native Hawaiian/Pacific Islander - 0.2%
- White - 93%
- Multiracial - 1.4%

Additionally, 211 students (42.2%) were eligible for reduced-price or free lunch.

== Athletics ==
KHS offers a number of athletic options for students. It competes in the Northern Shores Conference and Northern Michigan Football League, and is classified as a Class B school by the Michigan High School Athletic Association. Kingsley has a number of regional rivalries, however its most intense rivalry is with the Glen Lake Community School Lakers of Maple City in nearby Leelanau County. The school shares another rivalry with St. Francis High School in Traverse City. Kingsley offers the following sports:

- Baseball (boys)
- Basketball (girls & boys)
- Competitive cheer (girls)
- Cross country (girls & boys)
- Football (boys)
- Golf (boys)
- Soccer (girls & boys)
- Softball (girls)
- Track (girls & boys)
- Volleyball (girls)
- Wrestling (boys & girls)

The Kingsley Stags won the 2005 and 2023 Division 6 football championships.

== See also ==
- Cadillac Area Public Schools
- Traverse City Area Public Schools
