= Elk Rapids High School =

Public high school located in Elk Rapids, Michigan

Location
- 308 Meguzee Point Road; Elk Rapids, Michigan 49629; United States; 44°53′33″N 85°23′43″W

Information
- Motto: "Where Excellence is a Tradition"
- School district: Elk Rapids Schools
- Principal: Jack Young
- Teaching staff: 18.65 (on an FTE basis)
- Grades: 9-12
- Enrollment: 359 (2023-2024)
- Student to teacher ratio: 19.25
- Colors: Orange; Black
- Athletics: MHSAA Class C
- Athletics conference: Northern Shores Conference; Northern Michigan Football League
- Nickname: Elks
- Website: www.erschools.com/schools/elk-rapids-high-school/

Student assessments
- 2021–22 school year Change vs. prior year

M-STEP 11th grade proficiency rates (Science / Social Studies)
- Advanced %: 38.0 / 19.0
- Proficient %: 43.0 / 53.2
- PR. Proficient %: 10.1 / –
- Not Proficient %: 8.9 / ≤5

Average test scores
- SAT Total: 1093.3 (▲ +8.4)

Elk Rapids High School is a public high school located in Elk Rapids, Michigan. It serves grades 9-12 for the Elk Rapids School District.

== Academics ==
In the 2020 U.S. News & World Report survey of high schools, Elk Rapids ranked 844th nationally and 22nd in Michigan.

== Extracurricular activities ==
=== Athletics ===
The Elk Rapids Elks compete in the Northern Shores Conference and Northern Michigan Football League. The school colors are orange and black. Michigan High School Athletic Association sanctioned sports offered by Elk Rapids are:

- Baseball (boys)
- Basketball (girls and boys)
- Bowling (girls and boys)
- Cross country (girls and boys)
- Football (boys)
- Golf (boys)
- Ice hockey (boys)
- Skiing (girls and boys)
  - Boys state champion - 2019^{*}
  - Girls state champion - 2016^{**}
- Soccer (girls and boys)
  - Boys state champion - 1997, 1998
- Softball (girls)
- Tennis (girls and boys)
- Track and field (girls and boys)
- Volleyball (girls)
- Wrestling (boys)
    - ^{*}Co-op team with Traverse City St. Francis, Central Lake, and Grand Traverse Academy
    - ^{**}Co-op team with Traverse City St. Francis

Elk Rapids also competes in equestrian events for both boys and girls with the Michigan Interscholastic Horsemanship Association (MIHA). In 2019, 41 schools competed in their state tournament.

== Notable alumni ==
- Adam Trautman, National Football League (NFL) tight end
