= Cheboygan Area Schools =

School district in Michigan

Address
- 7461 N. Straits Highway Cheboygan, Cheboygan County, Michigan, 49721; United States

District information
- Grades: Pre-Kindergarten-12
- Superintendent: Spencer Byrd
- Schools: 5
- Budget: $19,550,000 2021-2022 expenditures
- NCES District ID: 2608910

Students and staff
- Students: 1,468 (2024-2025)
- Teachers: 91.48 (on an FTE basis) (2024-2025)
- Staff: 193.5 FTE (2024-2025)
- Student–teacher ratio: 16.05 (2024-2025)

Other information
- Website: www.chebschools.org

Cheboygan Area Schools is a public school district in Northern Michigan. It serves Cheboygan and the townships of Aloha, Beaugrand, Benton, and parts of the townships of Hebron, Munro, and Mullett.

== History ==
The first school in Cheboygan was established in 1848. During the late 19th and early 20th centuries, rural schoolhouses dotted the county. These belonged to independent primary school districts and were consolidated with Cheboygan Area Schools in the 1950s and 1960s.

A central school building was built in Cheboygan in 1872. The first class of Cheboygan High School graduated in 1884. According to a local newspaper at the time, "The first annual commencement of the Cheboygan high school will be very fine and those who want a seat had best go to the Opera House early Friday evening."

A new high school building was built in the early 20th century. According to a 1914 newspaper article, "The Cheboygan high school building is considered one of the finest buildings in this section of the state and is comparatively new." A gymnasium addition was built around 1938, paid for by the Works Progress Administration, but it burned in 1942. In 1950, the addition was replaced by a new building that contained classrooms and a gymnasium with a stage.

The current high school was dedicated on March 17, 1968. The former high school was demolished that year.

The district has faced controversy for its use of Native American imagery associated with its mascot, the Chiefs. In 2016, the district altered the team's logo to a headdress draped over the letter C because the previous logo, a Native American, looked too angry. While many schools have changed their Native American mascots to avoid stereotyping or racial caricature, "We treat it with respect", stated then-superintendent Paul Clark in 2020. "Our native population, they embrace the Chiefs and stand behind it."

== Schools ==
Schools in Cheboygan Area Schools district
School	Address	Notes
Cheboygan High School	801 West Lincoln Avenue, Cheboygan	Grades 8–12; built 1968
Cheboygan Middle & Intermediate School	905 West Lincoln Ave., Cheboygan	Grades 3–7; built 1998
East Elementary	440 Garfield Avenue, Cheboygan	Grades PreK-2; built 1959
Inverness Academy	7461 North Straits Highway, Cheboygan	Alternative high school; built 1960
