= Kalkaska High School =

High school in Kalkaska, Michigan, United States

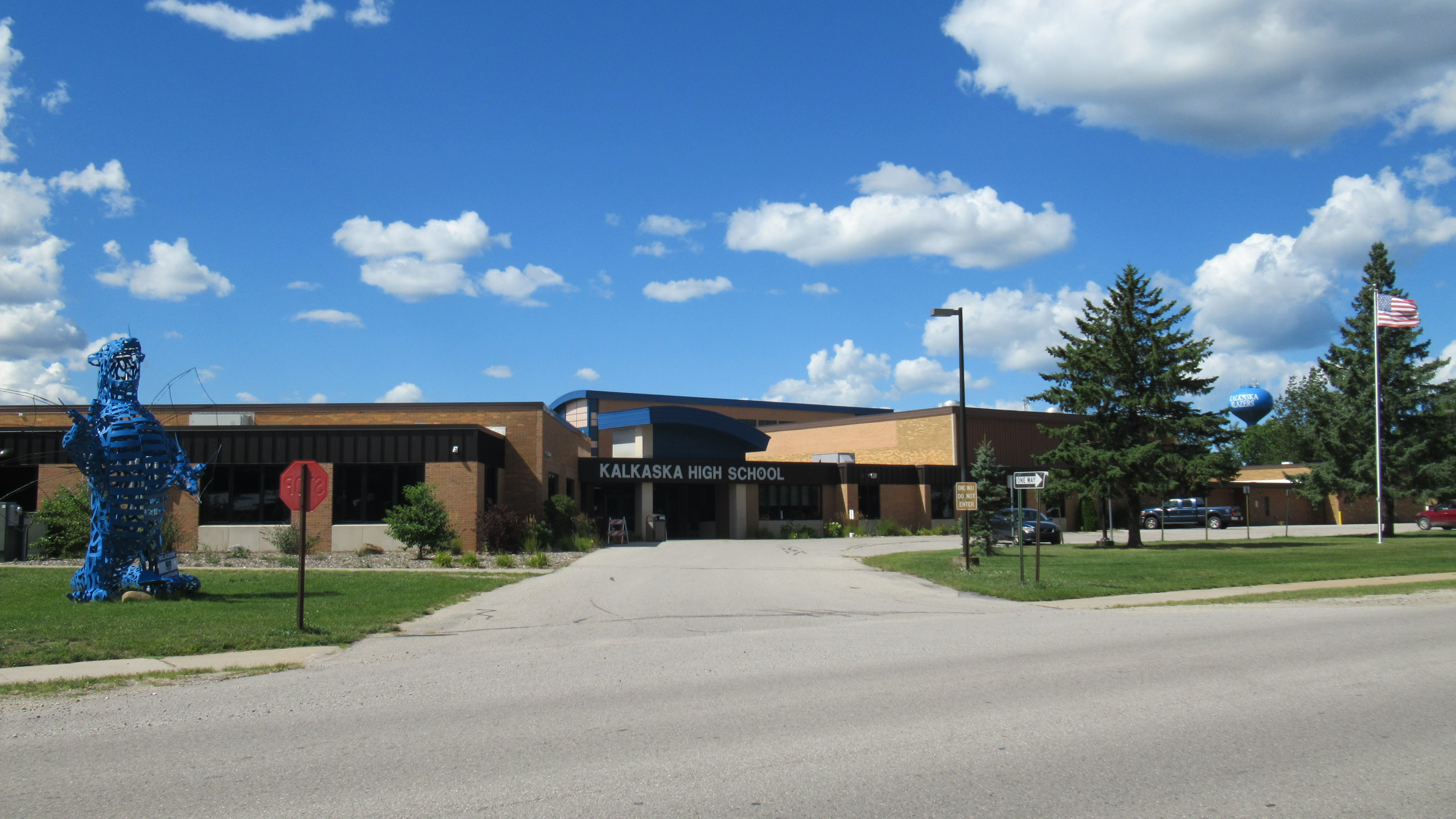
- Main entrance along N. Birch Street

Location
- 109 North Birch Street; Kalkaska, Michigan 49646; United States; 44°44′10″N 85°11′07″W

Information
- Type: Public
- Motto: Blazing A Trail To Excellence
- School district: Kalkaska Public Schools
- Principal: Stacy Short
- Teaching staff: 24.00 (on an FTE basis)
- Grades: 9-12
- Enrollment: 466 (2023-2024)
- Student to teacher ratio: 19.42
- Colors: Blue; White
- Athletics conference: Northern Shores Conference; Independent (football only)
- Nickname: Blazers
- Yearbook: Hi-Lites
- Website: www.kpschools.com/vnews/display.v/SEC/Kalkaska%20High%20School

Student assessments
- 2021–22 school year Change vs. prior year

M-STEP 11th grade proficiency rates (Science / Social Studies)
- Advanced %: 19.1 / ≤5
- Proficient %: 32.6 / –
- PR. Proficient %: 11.2 / 57.3
- Not Proficient %: 37.1 / 9.0

Average test scores
- SAT Total: 950.1 (▼ −23.5)

Kalkaska High School is a public high school located in Kalkaska, Michigan. It is part of Kalkaska Public Schools, which, in turn, is part of the larger Northwest Educational Services coordinating school district, formerly the Traverse Bay Area Intermediate School District (TBAISD).

== Demographics ==
The demographic breakdown of the 434 students enrolled in 2018-19 was:

- Male - 51.6%
- Female - 48.4%
- Native American/Alaskan - 0.5%
- Asian - 0.5%
- Black - 0.9%
- Hispanic - 2.5%
- White - 94.5%
- Multiracial - 1.1%

56.0% of the students were eligible for free or reduced-cost lunch.

== Athletics ==
The Kalkaska Blazers compete in the Northern Shores Conference in all sports except football, which is an Independent. School colors are blue and white. The following Michigan High School Athletic Association (MHSAA) sanctioned sports are offered:

- Baseball (boys)
- Basketball (boys and girls)
- Cross country (boys and girls)
- Football (boys)
- Golf (boys and girls)
- Ice hockey (boys)
- Soccer (boys and girls)
- Softball (girls)
- Track and field (boys and girls)
- Volleyball (girls)
- Wrestling (boys)
- Powerlifting (boys and girls)
- Cheerleading (boys and girls)

== Notable alumni ==
- Ron Winter, National Football League (NFL) referee
- Renee Raudman, American voice and television actress
- Ron Ryckman Sr., former member of the Kansas House of Representatives
