= Joe Kerridge =

American football player (born 1992)

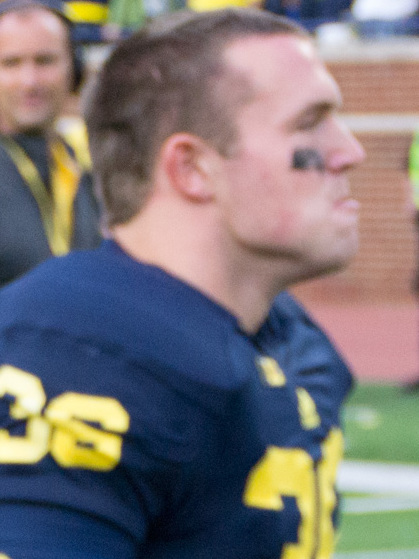

No. 40
- Position: Fullback

Personal information
- Born: September 17, 1992 (age 34); Traverse City, Michigan, U.S.
- Listed height: 6 ft 0 in (1.83 m)
- Listed weight: 246 lb (112 kg)

Career information
- High school: St. Francis (Traverse City, Michigan)
- College: Michigan
- NFL draft: 2016: undrafted

Career history
- Washington Redskins (2016)*; Green Bay Packers (2016–2018); Cleveland Browns (2019)
- * Offseason or practice squad member only

Career NFL statistics
- Receptions: 1
- Receiving yards: 3
- Stats at Pro Football Reference

Joseph Kerridge (born September 17, 1992) is an American former professional football player who was a fullback in the National Football League (NFL). Kerridge attended high school at St. Francis High School in Traverse City, Michigan, where he was a three-sport athlete in football, basketball, and lacrosse. He played college football at Michigan, where he was elected team captain in 2015. Kerridge was signed by the Washington Redskins as an undrafted free agent in 2016, and was also a member of the Green Bay Packers and Cleveland Browns.

== College career ==
Kerridge was a four-year letterman, four-time Academic All-Big Ten Conference, and team captain at the University of Michigan, where he played on the Michigan Wolverines football team from 2011 to 2015. Kerridge played in 47 games, logging 18 carries for 121 yards, 17 receptions for 123 yards, and 1 touchdown.

=== College statistics ===
| Year | Team | G | GS | Rushing | | | | | Receiving | | | | |
| Year | Team | G | GS | Att | Yds | Avg | Lng | TD | Rec | Yds | Avg | Lng | TD |
|---|---|---|---|---|---|---|---|---|---|---|---|---|---|
| 2012 | MICH | 11 | 0 | 0 | 0 | 0.0 | 0 | 0 | 1 | 12 | 12.0 | 12 | 0 |
| 2013 | MICH | 13 | 7 | 1 | 3 | 3.0 | 3 | 0 | 5 | 25 | 5.0 | 10 | 0 |
| 2014 | MICH | 12 | 3 | 3 | 56 | 18.7 | 52 | 0 | 6 | 53 | 8.8 | 17 | 0 |
| 2015 | MICH | 11 | 4 | 14 | 62 | 4.4 | 34 | 1 | 5 | 33 | 6.6 | 9 | 0 |
| Total | | 47 | 14 | 18 | 121 | 6.7 | 52 | 1 | 17 | 123 | 7.2 | 17 | 0 |
Source: MGoBlue.com

== Professional career ==
Pre-draft measurables
| Height | Weight | 40-yard dash | 10-yard split | 20-yard split | 20-yard shuttle | Three-cone drill | Vertical jump | Broad jump | Bench press |
|---|---|---|---|---|---|---|---|---|---|
| 6 ft 0 in (1.83 m) | 240 lb (109 kg) | 4.79 s | 1.73 s | 2.74 s | 4.24 s | 7.09 s | 34 1/2 | 9 ft 9 in (2.97 m) | 24 reps |
All values are from Pro Day

=== Washington Redskins ===
After going undrafted in the 2016 NFL draft, Kerridge signed a 3-year $1,380,000 contract with the Washington Redskins on May 6, 2016. On September 3, 2016, he was waived by the Redskins during final team cuts. Kerridge was signed to the Redskins' practice squad the following day. On September 5, 2016, he was released by the Redskins.

=== Green Bay Packers ===
On October 3, 2016, Kerridge was signed to the Green Bay Packers' practice squad. He was promoted from the practice squad to the active roster on November 7, 2016.

On March 15, 2017, the Packers re-signed Kerridge. The contract was a one-year, $550,000 deal. He was waived from injured reserve on September 8, 2017, and resigned to the Packers' practice squad on October 30, 2017. He was promoted to the active roster on November 18, 2017. He was waived on December 19, 2017, and re-signed to the practice squad. He was promoted back to the active roster on December 30, 2017.

He was re-signed on March 14, 2018. He was waived on September 1, 2018, and was signed to the practice squad the next day. He was released on October 30, 2018.

=== Cleveland Browns ===
On August 10, 2019, Kerridge signed a 2-year $1,380,000 contract with the Cleveland Browns. Kerridge was waived with an injury designation on August 31, 2019, and subsequently reverted to injured reserve. He was waived from injured reserve on October 18.

== NFL career statistics ==
=== Regular season ===
| Year | Team | G | GS | Rushing | | | | | Receiving | | | | | Fumbles | |
| Year | Team | G | GS | Att | Yds | Avg | Lng | TD | Rec | Yds | Avg | Lng | TD | FUM | Lost |
|---|---|---|---|---|---|---|---|---|---|---|---|---|---|---|---|
| 2016 | GB | 8 | 0 | 1 | 4 | 4.0 | 4 | 0 | 0 | 0 | 0.0 | 0 | 0 | 0 | 0 |
| 2017 | GB | 4 | 0 | 0 | 0 | 0.0 | 0 | 0 | 1 | 3 | 3.0 | 3 | 0 | 0 | 0 |
| Total | | 12 | 0 | 1 | 0 | 0.0 | 0 | 0 | 1 | 3 | 3.0 | 3 | 0 | 0 | 0 |
Source: NFL.com
