= Riley Bullough =

American football player (born 1993)

No. 49
- Position: Linebacker

Personal information
- Born: November 23, 1993 (age 32); Traverse City, Michigan, U.S.
- Listed height: 6 ft 2 in (1.88 m)
- Listed weight: 228 lb (103 kg)

Career information
- High school: St. Francis (Traverse City)
- College: Michigan State
- NFL draft: 2017: undrafted

Career history
- Tampa Bay Buccaneers (2017–2018); Tennessee Titans (2019)*
- * Offseason or practice squad member only

Career NFL statistics
- Total tackles: 16
- Pass deflections: 1
- Stats at Pro Football Reference

Riley Bullough (born November 23, 1993) is an American former professional football player who was a linebacker in the National Football League (NFL). He played college football for the Michigan State Spartans, and was signed by the Tampa Bay Buccaneers as an undrafted free agent in 2017.

== College career ==
Bullough played four seasons for the Spartans, appearing in 50 games. Over the course of his career, he recorded 214 tackles, 18 tackles for loss, and 7.5 sacks along with 4 interceptions, forced 2 fumbles and 3 fumble recoveries. He was named to the All-Big Ten second-team as a junior and the All-Big Ten third-team as a senior.

== Professional career ==
=== Tampa Bay Buccaneers ===
Bullough signed with the Tampa Bay Buccaneers as an undrafted free agent on May 1, 2017. He was waived on September 2, 2017, and was signed to the Buccaneers' practice squad the next day. He was promoted to the active roster on December 12, 2017.

On September 1, 2018, Bullough was placed on injured reserve. On September 11, 2018, Bullough was waived by the Buccaneers with an injury settlement. He was re-signed to the active roster on October 22, 2018. He appeared in nine games for the Buccaneers, starting three, with 14 tackles and a pass defended in 2018.

On April 29, 2019, Bullough was waived by the Buccaneers.

=== Tennessee Titans ===
On April 30, 2019, Bullough was claimed off waivers by the Tennessee Titans. He was waived/injured on August 10, 2019, and placed on injured reserve. He was released on August 20.

Bullough announced his retirement from professional football in December 2019.

== Personal life ==
Bullough's parents are Shane and LeeAnn Bullough. His father was a linebacker at Michigan State from 1983 to 1986. He has two brothers, Max and Byron. Max previously played with the Houston Texans and Byron played for the Spartans.
