= Northwest Education Services =

Intermediate school district in Michigan, US

Northwest Education Services is an intermediate school district in Northern Michigan, USA. It provides services to schools, including sixteen public school districts, in the counties of Antrim, Benzie, Grand Traverse, Kalkaska, and Leelanau.

== Northwest Education Services Career Tech ==
Northwest Education Services Career Tech, located in Traverse City, provides technical vocational training to students in the intermediate school district.

== School districts ==
- Alba Public Schools
- Bellaire Public Schools
- Benzie Central Schools
- Buckley Community Schools
- Crawford School-Excelsior District #1
- Elk Rapids Public Schools
- Forest Area Community Schools
- Frankfort–Elberta Area Schools
- Glen Lake Community Schools
- Kalkaska Public Schools
- Kingsley Area Schools
- Leland Public Schools
- Mancelona Public Schools
- Northport Public School
- Suttons Bay Public Schools
- Traverse City Area Public Schools
