= Kalamazoo Christian High School =

Location
- 2121 Stadium Drive; Kalamazoo, Michigan 49006; United States; 42°16′26″N 85°36′54″W

Information
- School type: Private Christian
- Superintendent: Mark Verkaik (Lead Admin)
- CEEB code: 232170
- Principal: Dirk Walhout
- Grades: 9-12
- Colors: Purple and Gold
- Athletics conference: Southwestern Athletic Conference (MHSAA)
- Team name: Comets
- Affiliation: Christian
- Information: 269-381-2251
- Website: Kalamazoo Christian School Association Homepage

Kalamazoo Christian High School is a private Christian high school in Kalamazoo, Michigan, serving students from ninth through twelfth grades.

== History ==
The history of Christian education in Kalamazoo starts with the establishment of the first Kalamazoo Christian elementary school in 1877 by the Walnut Street Church. The first Christian high school in Kalamazoo was established in 1939. The high school moved to its current campus in 1960. In November 1992 the Kalamazoo Christian High School and four K-8 Schools joined to form the Kalamazoo Christian School Association.

In 1997, a teacher was fired from his teaching position at Kalamazoo Christian High School for holding views about homosexuality that the Kalamazoo Christian Schools Association Board found to be "unbiblical." At the time, the teacher had been at the school for thirty years.

== Athletics ==
The school's mascot is Kaptain Comet, with its teams being called The Comets. The school's colors are purple and gold. The Comets are part of the Kalamazoo Valley Association. The following MHSAA-sanctioned sports are offered with both boys and girls teams (unless specified):

- Baseball (boys)
- Basketball
  - Boys state champion - 1959, 1983, 2001 and 2008.
- Bowling
- Cross country
  - Boys state champion - 1981.
- Football (boys)
- Golf
- Soccer
  - Girls state champion - 2003, 2004, 2007 and 2008.
- Softball (girls)
  - State champion - 1996, 1997, 1998, 1999, 2000, 2002, and 2013
- Tennis
- Track & field
- Volleyball (girls)

== See also ==
- Kalamazoo Central High School (which shares the same school abbreviation: KCHS)
- Kalamazoo Public Schools
