= St. Francis High School (Traverse City, Michigan) =

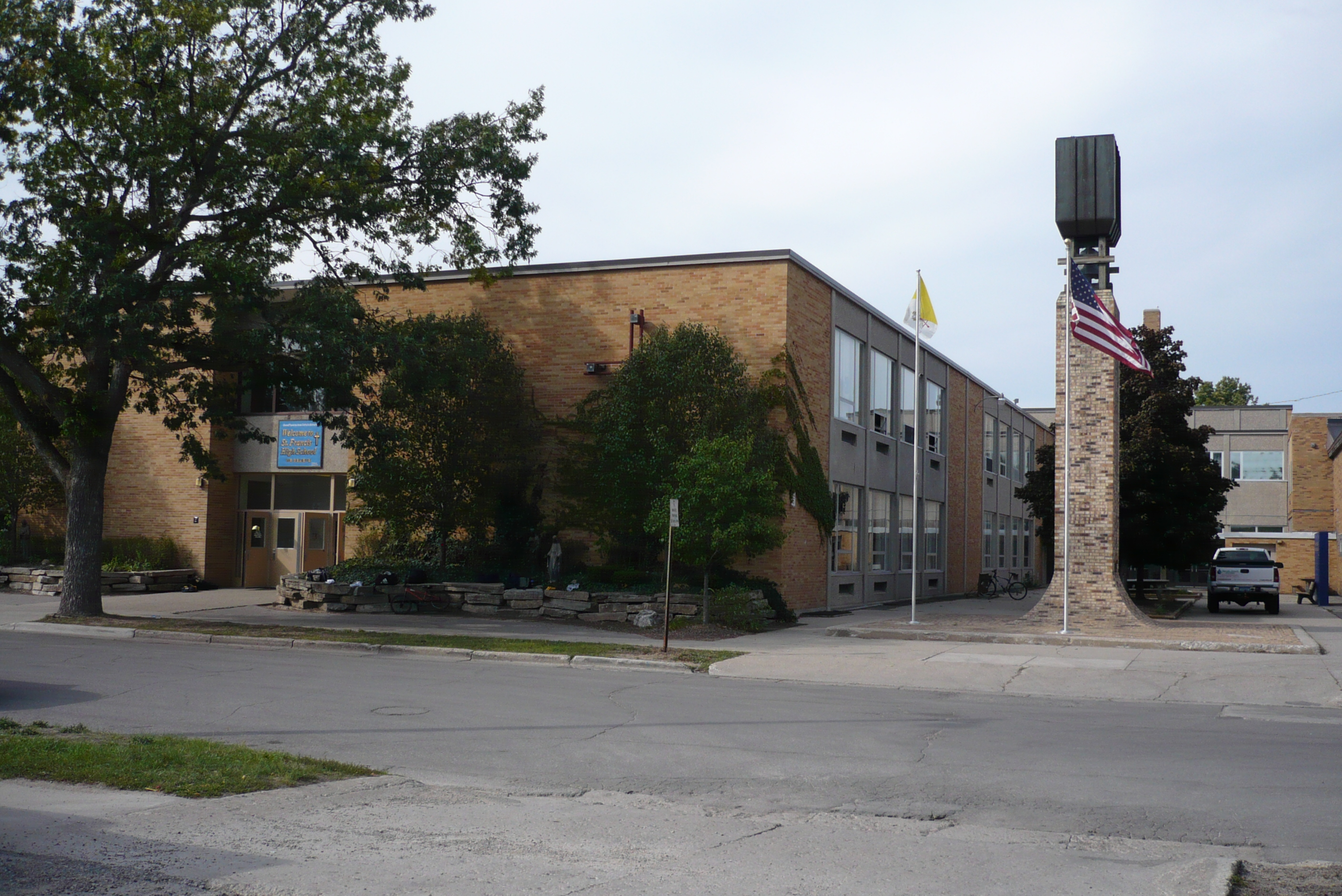

Location
- 123 East Eleventh Street; Traverse City, Michigan 49684; United States; 44°45′22″N 85°37′22″W

Information
- Type: Private, Coeducational
- Religious affiliations: Roman Catholic, Dominican Sisters
- Established: 1877
- Founder: Michael Weber
- President: Rachael Milliman
- Principal: Joseph Carlson
- Grades: 9–12
- Colors: Navy and Gold
- Fight song: Notre Dame Victory March
- Athletics conference: Independent; Northern Michigan Football League
- Nickname: Gladiators
- Rival: Kingsley High School
- Website: gtacs.org/st-francis-high-school/

St. Francis High School is a private, Roman Catholic high school in Traverse City, Michigan. It is located in the Roman Catholic Diocese of Gaylord.

== Background ==
St. Francis High School is located in Traverse City, Michigan, and is part of the Grand Traverse Area Catholic Schools. This parochial school system traces its roots back to 1877 when it was founded by the Dominican Sisters.

In 1877, Father George Ziegler made an appeal to a priest friend in New Jersey asking for Sisters to help in educating Traverse City's youth. Six young Dominican nuns boarded a steamship for Traverse City, opening Holy Angels Convent School (located on Union Street) for six pupils on October 29, 1877. The new, four-floor Holy Angels Academy (convent and boarding school) was dedicated in 1883. The building was constructed on land donated by Perry Hannah, and cost $10,000.

Immaculate Conception parish was formed to lessen the distance to daily mass; the new facility was dedicated on February 22, 1906, and it housed the church on the upper level and the school on the lower level. When it opened in September, the school had 80 students in three classrooms. St. Francis Elementary (today’s Holy Angels Elementary School) opened to students in January 1955 with 14 classrooms and a study hall.

The Immaculate Conception and St. Francis school systems were consolidated in 1969. The newly constructed St. Elizabeth Ann Seton Middle School opened on donated land near Hammond and 3 Mile Road in 1998. The remaining portion of the old Immaculate Conception School was demolished in 2018. A 1961 time capsule is unearthed. The new Immaculate Conception Elementary School opened in 2019 for students in Preschool through Grade 5.

Traverse City St. Francis (TCSF) is three-time recipient of Top 50 Catholic high school honors, having earned distinction among the approximately 1,300 Catholic high schools in the United States.

== Athletics ==
Fall sports

- Boys' Football
- Boys' Tennis
- Boys' Soccer
- Boys'/Girls' Cross Country
- Girls' Volleyball
- Girls' Cheerleading
- Girls' Golf
- Girls' Swimming

Winter sports

- Boys'/Girls' Basketball
- Boys' Wrestling
- Boys'/Girls' Skiing
- Boys' Ice Hockey

Spring sports

- Boys'/Girls' Outdoor Track
- Boys' Baseball
- Boys' Golf
- Girls' Softball
- Girls' Tennis
- Girls' Soccer

=== Football ===
The St. Francis Football team has won state titles in 1992, 1999, 2003, 2005, 2008 and 2009. Other trips to the State Finals include 1983, 1998, 2007 and 2022. Since the playoff system was established in Michigan, TCSF has qualified for the playoffs 23 times. This includes the current streak of 19 years, which is an MHSAA record. The Gladiators have an all-time winning percentage of .757 (418-133-4). Their regular-season winning percentage is .763 (375-115-4) and their playoff winning percentage is .705 (43-18). The Gladiators are members of the Northern Michigan Football League, which they have won for six consecutive seasons. During this streak, they have not lost a single conference game. Other teams that St. Francis considers its rivals are the Muskegon Catholic Central Crusaders, the Saginaw Nouvel Catholic Central Panthers, and the Kingsley Stags. Although the Benzie Central Huskies have been considered a rival of St. Francis, The record between the teams stands at 37-0 for St. Francis. Many Gladiators have gone on to play football at the collegiate level. The most recent Division I recruits are Max and Riley Bullough who were both recruited by the Michigan State Spartans. Max also went on to play in the NFL for the Houston Texans. Another notable football player to graduate from St. Francis is fullback Joe Kerridge. Joe walked on to the 2011 University of Michigan Wolverines, quickly earning a full-ride scholarship. In 2015 Kerridge was named team captain and went on to play for the Green Bay Packers.

== Notable alumni ==
- Angus MacLellan — professional rugby player with the United States national rugby union team
- Damon Sheehy-Guiseppi - professional football player with the Cleveland Browns
- Matt Noveskey - professional singer, songwriter, record producer, guitarist, and bassist, best known for his work with the bands Blue October and (a+)machines.
- Carter Oosterhouse - television personality and model
- Max Bullough - former professional football player with the Houston Texans and Cleveland Browns
- Riley Bullough - former professional football player with the Tampa Bay Buccaneers and Tennessee Titans
- Joe Kerridge - former professional football player with the Green Bay Packers
