= List of high schools in Michigan =

This is a list of high schools in the state of Michigan.

== Alcona County ==
- Alcona Community High School, Lincoln

== Alger County ==
- Burt Township K-12 School, Grand Marais
- Munising Baptist School (K-12), Wetmore
- Munising Middle/High School, Munising
- Superior Central School (K-12), Eben Junction

== Allegan County ==
- Hamilton High School, Hamilton
- Holland Christian High School, Holland
- Hopkins High School, Hopkins
- Martin High School, Martin
- Saugatuck Middle/High School, Saugatuck

=== Allegan ===
- Allegan County Area Technical & Education Center
- Allegan High School

=== Fennville ===
- Fennville Alternative High School
- Fennville High School

=== Otsego ===
- Otsego Baptist Academy (K-12)
- Otsego High School

=== Plainwell ===
- Plainwell High School
- Renaissance Alternative High School

=== Wayland ===
- Wayland Career Connections Academy
- Wayland Union High School

== Alpena County ==
=== Alpena ===
- ACES Academy (7-12)
- Alpena High School
- Immanuel Lutheran High School (opens fall 2026)

== Antrim County ==
- Alba Public School (K-12), Alba
- Bellaire High School, Bellaire
- Central Lake High School (6-12), Central Lake
- Ellsworth Community School (K-12), Ellsworth

=== Elk Rapids ===
- Elk Rapids High School
- Sunrise Alternative Academy

=== Mancelona ===
- Mancelona High School
- North Central Academy Charter School (K-12)

== Arenac County ==
- Au Gres-Sims High School, Au Gres
- Standish-Sterling Central High School, Standish

== Baraga County ==
- Baraga Junior/Senior High School (7-12), Baraga
- L'Anse Junior/Senior High School, L'Anse

== Barry County ==
- Barry County Christian School (K-12), Hastings
- Hastings High School, Hastings
- Lakewood High School, Lake Odessa
- Thornapple Kellogg High School, Middleville

=== Delton ===
- Cedar Creek Christian School (K-12)
- Delton Kellogg High School

== Bay County ==
- Bay City Western High School, Auburn
- Bay-Arenac Community High School, Essexville
- Garber High School, Essexville
- John Glenn High School, Bangor Township (Bay City address)
- Pinconning Area High School, Pinconning

=== Bay City ===
- All Saints Central High School
- Bay City Central High School
- Bay City Eastern High School
- Wenona Center High School

== Benzie County ==
- Frankfort High School, Frankfort

=== Benzonia ===
- Benzie Alternative Academy (7-12)
- Benzie Central High School

== Berrien County ==
- Bridgman High School, Bridgman
- Coloma High School, Coloma
- Eau Claire Middle-High School, Eau Claire
- Lakeshore High School, Stevensville
- New Buffalo Middle/High School, New Buffalo
- River Valley Middle/High School, Three Oaks

=== Benton Harbor ===
- Benton Harbor High School
- C.A.P.E. Center
- Countryside Academy (K-12)

=== Berrien Springs ===
- Andrews Academy
- Berrien Springs High School
- Discovery Alternative Academy

=== Buchanan ===
- Buchanan High School
- Jesus Christ Academy (2-12)

=== Niles ===
- Brandywine Innovation Academy
- Brandywine Middle/Senior High School
- Niles Cedar Lane Alternative School
- Niles High School

=== St. Joseph ===
- Lake Michigan Catholic High School
- Michigan Lutheran High School
- Our Lady of the Lake Catholic High School
- St. Joseph High School

=== Watervliet ===
- Grace Christian School (PK-12)
- Watervliet Senior High School
- WAY Alternative Program

== Branch County ==
- Bronson Jr./Sr. High School, Bronson
- Quincy High School, Quincy

=== Coldwater ===
- Coldwater High School
- Pansophia Academy (K-12)

== Calhoun County ==
- Athens Junior/SeniorHigh School, Athens
- Homer High School, Homer
- Marshall High School, Marshall
- Marshall Opportunity High School, Albion
- Tekonsha Senior High School, Tekonsha
- Union City High School, Union City

=== Battle Creek ===
- Battle Creek Central High School
- Bedford Bible Church School (K-12)
- Harper Creek High School
- Lakeview Alternative High School
- Lakeview High School
- Pennfield Senior High School
- St. Philip Catholic Central High School
- W.K. Kellogg Preparatory High School

== Cass County ==
- Ross Beatty Junior/Senior High School, Cassopolis

=== Dowagiac ===
- Calvary Bible Academy (K-12)
- Dowagiac Union High School
- Pathfinders Alternative High School

=== Edwardsburg ===
- Edwardsburg Alternative Learning Center
- Edwardsburg High School

=== Marcellus ===
- Marcellus High School
- Volinia Outcomes Alternative School

== Charlevoix County ==
- Beaver Island Community School, Beaver Island (PK-12)
- Boyne Falls Public School (K-12), Boyne Falls
- Charlevoix Middle/High School, Charlevoix
- East Jordan Middle/High School, East Jordan

=== Boyne City ===
- Boyne City High School
- Concord Academy Boyne (K-12)
- Morgan-Shaw Alternative School

== Cheboygan County ==
- Inland Lakes High School, Indian River
- Northern Michigan Christian Academy (K-12), Burt Lake
- Wolverine Middle/High School, Wolverine

=== Cheboygan ===
- Cheboygan High School
- Inverness Academy

== Chippewa County ==
- DeTour High School, De Tour Village
- Maplewood Baptist Academy (K-12), Kinross
- Pickford Public School (PK-12), Pickford
- Rudyard School (K-12), Rudyard
- Whitefish Township Community School (K-12), Paradise

=== Brimley ===
- Brimley Middle/High School
- Ojibwe Charter School (K-12)

=== Sault Ste Marie ===
- Malcolm Alternative High School
- Sault Area High School

== Clare County ==
- Farwell High School, Farwell
- Harrison High School, Harrison

=== Clare ===
- Clare High School
- Pioneer Alternative High School

== Clinton County ==
- Bath Community High School, Bath
- DeWitt High School, DeWitt
- Fowler High School, Fowler
- Ovid-Elsie Alternative High School, Ovid
- Ovid-Elsie High School, Elsie
- Pewamo-Westphalia Junior/Senior High School, Pewamo

=== St. Johns ===
- St. Johns High School
- S.T.R.I.V.E. Academy

== Crawford County ==
- Grayling High School, Grayling

== Delta County ==
- Bark River-Harris High School, Harris
- Big Bay de Noc High School, Cooks
- Gladstone Area High School, Gladstone
- Mid-Peninsula High School, Rock
- Rapid River High School, Rapid River

=== Escanaba ===
- Escanaba Senior High School
- Escanaba Student Success Center (8-12)

== Dickinson County ==
- Iron Mountain High School, Iron Mountain
- Kingsford High School, Kingsford
- North Dickinson County School (K-12), Felch
- Norway High School, Norway

== Eaton County ==
- Bellevue High School, Bellevue
- Grand Ledge High School, Grand Ledge
- Olivet High School, Olivet
- Potterville Middle/High School, Potterville
- Waverly High School, Waverly (Lansing address)

=== Charlotte ===
- Charlotte High School
- Project Success Alternative School

=== Eaton Rapids ===
- Eaton Rapids High School
- Greyhound Central Performance Academy

=== Vermontville ===
- Maple Valley Junior/Senior High School
- Pathways Alternative High School

== Emmet County ==
- Alanson Public School, Alanson
- Mackinaw City School (K-12), Mackinaw City
- Pellston High School, Pellston

=== Harbor Springs ===
- Harbor Light Christian School (PK-12)
- Harbor Springs High School

=== Petoskey ===
- Concord Academy of Petoskey (K-12)
- Petoskey High School
- St. Michael High School Chesterton Academy

== Genesee County ==
- Beecher High School, Beecher
- Elisabeth Ann Johnson High School, Mt. Morris
- Flushing High School, Flushing
- Genesee Junior/Senior High School, Genesee
- Goodrich High School, Goodrich
- Grand Blanc High School, Grand Blanc
- LakeVille Memorial High School, Otisville
- Linden High School, Linden
- Swartz Creek High School, Swartz Creek

=== Burton ===
- Atherton High School
- Bendle High School
- Bentley High School
- CenterPoint Christian Academy (K-12)
- Genesee Christian School (K-12)
- St. Thomas More Academy
- Valley Christian Academy

=== Clio ===
- Clio Area High School
- Clio Community High School

=== Davison ===
- Davison Alternative Education
- Davison High School
- Faith Baptist School (K-12)

=== Fenton ===
- Fenton Alternative Academy
- Fenton High School
- Lake Fenton High School

=== Flint ===
- Academy West Alternative Education
- Atlantis Alternative High School
- Beecher Higher Learning Academy
- Carman-Ainsworth High School
- Genesee Career Institute
- Genesee County Career Tech Education Early Middle College
- Genesee Early College
- Hamady Community High School
- International Academy of Flint (2-12)
- Kearsley High School
- Michigan School for the Deaf
- Mott Middle College
- New Standard Academy Charter School (PK-12)
- Powers Catholic High School
- Richfield Public School Academy
- Southwestern Classical Academy
- Waterbrook Christian Academy (K-12)
- WAY Academy of Flint (7-12)

=== Montrose ===
- Choice Alternative Education
- Hill-McCloy High School

== Gladwin County ==
- Beaverton High School, Beaverton

=== Gladwin ===
- Gladwin Alternative Education/C.O.O.L. School
- Gladwin High School
- Skeels Christian School (PK-12)

== Gogebic County ==
- A.D. Johnston Senior/Junior High School (7-12), Bessemer
- Wakefield-Marenisco School (K-12), Wakefield
- Watersmeet Township School (K-12), Watersmeet

=== Ironwood ===
- Gogebic County Community Education
- Luther L. Wright School (K-12)

== Grand Traverse County ==
- Interlochen Center for the Arts, Interlochen
- Kingsley High School, Kingsley

=== Traverse City ===
- Grand Traverse Academy (K-12)
- The Greenspire High School
- St. Francis High School
- Traverse City Central High School
- Traverse City Alternative High School
- Traverse City West Senior High School
- Traverse City Christian School (PK-12)

== Gratiot County ==
- Alma High School, Alma
- Ashley High School, Ashley
- Breckenridge Middle/High School, Breckenridge
- Fulton Middle/High School, Middleton
- Ithaca High School, Ithaca
- St. Louis High School, St. Louis

== Hillsdale County ==
- Bird Lake Christian Academy (K-12), Osseo
- Camden-Frontier School (K-12), Camden
- Litchfield High School, Litchfield
- North Adams High School, North Adams
- Owens High School (7-12), Reading
- Waldron Area School, Waldron

=== Hillsdale ===
- Hillsdale Academy
- Hillsdale High School
- Horizon Alternative School
- Will Carleton Academy Charter School (K-12)

=== Jonesville ===
- Jonesville High School
- Pathways Alternative School

=== Pittsford ===
- Freedom Christian School/Homeschool (K-12)
- Pittsford High School

== Houghton County ==
- Dollar Bay-Tamarack City High School, Dollar Bay
- Hancock Central High School (Hancock, Michigan), Hancock
- Houghton High School, Houghton
- Jeffers High School (7-12), Painesdale
- Lake Linden–Hubbell High School, Lake Linden

=== Calumet ===
- Calumet-Laurium-Keweenaw High School
- Horizon Alternative High School

=== Chassell ===
- Chassell Township School
- Copper Country Christian School

== Huron County ==
- Caseville Public School, Caseville
- Harbor Beach High School, Harbor Beach
- Laker High School, Pigeon
- North Huron Secondary School (7-12), Kinde
- Owendale-Gagetown High School, Owendale
- Port Hope Community School (K-12), Port Hope
- Ubly Community Junior/Senior High School, Ubly

=== Bad Axe ===
- Ascent Alternative High School
- Bad Axe High School

== Ingham County ==
- Dansville High School, Dansville
- East Lansing High School, East Lansing
- Haslett High School, Haslett
- Leslie High School, Leslie
- Mason High School, Mason
- Okemos High School, Okemos
- Stockbridge Junior / Senior High School, Stockbridge
- Webberville High School, Webberville
- Williamston High School, Williamston

=== Holt ===
- Capitol City Baptist School (K-12)
- Holt High School

=== Lansing ===
- Eastern High School
- Everett High School
- Ingham Alternative High School
- J.W. Sexton High School
- Lansing Baptist School (1-12)
- Lansing Catholic High School
- Lansing Christian School (K-12)
- Lansing Technical High School
- New Covenant Christian School (K-12)

== Ionia County ==
- Saranac Junior/Senior High School, Saranac

=== Belding ===
- Belding Alternative Education
- Belding High School

=== Ionia ===
- Douglas R. Welch Alternative High School
- Ionia High School

=== Lake Odessa ===
- Faith Christian School (K-12)
- Lakewood High School

=== Portland ===
- PACE Alternative School
- Portland High School
- St. Patrick High School

== Iosco County ==
- Hale High School, Hale
- Oscoda High School, Oscoda
- Tawas Area High School, Tawas City
- Whittemore-Prescott High School, Whittemore

== Iron County ==
- Forest Park High School, Crystal Falls
- West Iron County High School, Iron River

== Isabella County ==
- Shepherd Senior High School, Shepherd

=== Mount Pleasant ===
- Beal City Middle/High School
- Mount Pleasant High School
- Odyssey Middle/High School
- Sacred Heart Academy High School

== Jackson County ==
- Columbia Central Junior/Senior High School, Brooklyn
- Columbia Options High School, Clarklake
- Concord High School, Concord
- Grass Lake High School, Grass Lake
- Hanover-Horton High School, Horton
- Michigan Center Jr/Sr High School, Michigan Center
- Springport High School, Springsport
- Western High School, Parma

=== Jackson ===
- da Vinci High School
- East Jackson Secondary School
- Jackson Christian School (PK-12)
- Jackson High School
- Lumen Christi Catholic School
- Northwest Connect Alternative High School
- Northwest High School
- Vandercook Lake High School
- Western Career Prep High School

=== Napoleon ===
- Ackerson Lake Alternative High School
- Napoleon High School

== Kalamazoo County ==
- Climax-Scotts Junior/Senior High School, Climax
- Parchment High School, Parchment
- Schoolcraft Junior-Senior High School, Schoolcraft

=== Galesburg ===
- Galesburg-Augusta Alternative Education (6-12)
- Galesburg-Augusta High School

=== Kalamazoo ===
- Comstock High School
- Comstock Compass High School
- Hackett Catholic Prep
- Heritage Christian Academy (PK-12)
- Kalamazoo Area Math and Science Center (KAMSC)
- Kalamazoo Christian High School
- Kalamazoo Central High School
- Kalamazoo Innovative Learning Program
- Loy Norrix High School
- Phoenix Alternative High School

=== Portage ===
- Portage Central High School
- Portage Community High School
- Portage Northern High School

=== Richland ===
- Gateway Alternative Academy
- Gull Lake High School

=== Vicksburg ===
- Pathways Alternative High School
- Vicksburg High School

== Kalkaska County ==
- Forest Area Middle/High School, Fife Lake
- Kalkaska High School, Kalkaska

== Kent County ==
- Caledonia High School, Caledonia
- Comstock Park High School, Comstock Park
- East Grand Rapids High School, East Grand Rapids
- Forest Hills Eastern High School, Ada
- Northview High School, Plainfield Township (Grand Rapids address)
- Sparta High School, Sparta

=== Byron Center ===
- Byron Center Charter School (K-12)
- Byron Center High School
- Zion Christian School (PK-12)

=== Cedar Springs ===
- Cedar Springs High School
- Creative Technologies Academy Charter School (K-12)
- New Beginnings Alternative High School

=== Grand Rapids ===
==== Public schools ====
- 54th Street Academy
- CA Frost Environmental Science Middle/High School
- City High-Middle School
- Covenant High School Grand Rapids
- Forest Hills Central High School
- Forest Hills Northern High School
- Godwin Heights High School
- Godwin Heights Learning Center
- Grand Rapids Montessori Middle High School
- Grand Rapids Public Museum High School
- Grand Rapids University Preparatory Academy (6-12)
- Innovation Central High School
- Kelloggsville High School
- Kenowa Hills High School
- Kent Career Technical Center
- Kent Innovation High
- Knights STEM Academy
- Link Learning Alternative High School
- Northview Next Career Center
- Northview Next Learning Center
- Ottawa Hills High School
- Pathways Alternative High School
- Southeast Career Pathways
- Southwest Middle High School - Academia Bilingüe
- Union High School
- West Michigan Aviation Academy

==== Private schools ====
- Catholic Central High School
- Grand Rapids Adventist Academy (K-12)
- Grand Rapids Christian High School
- Lake Michigan Academy (1-12)
- NorthPointe Christian Schools (K-12)
- Plymouth Christian High School (7-12)
- South Christian High School
- West Catholic High School

=== Grandville ===
- Grandville Calvin Christian School (PK-12)
- Grandville High School

=== Kent City ===
- Algoma Christian School (K-12)
- Kent City High School

=== Kentwood ===
- Crossroads Alternative High School
- East Kentwood High School
- West Michigan Lutheran High School

=== Lowell ===
- Lowell High School
- Unity Alternative High School

=== Rockford ===
- River Valley Alternative Academy
- Rockford High School

=== Walker ===
- Covenant Christian High School
- West Michigan Academy of Environmental Science (K-12)

=== Wyoming ===
- East Lee Alternative Campus
- Lee High School
- The Potter's House (K-12)
- Rogers High School
- Tri Unity Christian School (PK-12)
- Wyoming High School
- Wyoming Park High School
- Wyoming Secondary Learning Academy

== Keweenaw County ==
- Horizons Alternative High School, Mohawk

== Lake County ==
- Baldwin Senior High School, Baldwin

== Lapeer County ==
- Almont High School, Almont
- Dryden High School (7-12), Dryden

=== Lapeer ===
- Lapeer Center for Innovation
- Lapeer High School

=== North Branch ===
- North Branch High School
- Quest Alternative High School

=== Imlay City ===
- Imlay City High School
- Spartan Bridge/Venture Alternative High School

== Leelanau County ==
- Glen Lake Community School, Maple City
- The Leelanau School, Glen Arbor
- Leland Public School (K-12), Michigan
- Northport Public School (K-12), Northport
- St. Mary High School, Lake Leelanau
- Suttons Bay High School, Suttons Bay

== Lenawee County ==
- Addison High School, Addison
- Blissfield High School, Blissfield
- Britton Deerfield High School, Britton
- Clinton High School, Clinton
- Morenci Area Middle/High School, Morenci
- Onsted High School, Onsted
- Sand Creek High School, Sand Creek
- Tecumseh High School, Tecumseh

=== Adrian ===
- Adrian High School
- Lenawee Christian School (K-12)
- Madison High School

=== Hudson ===
- Hudson High School
- Hudson Tech Alternative High School
- Southern Michigan Center for Science and Industry

== Livingston County ==
- Fowlerville High School, Fowlerville
- Hartland High School, Hartland

=== Brighton ===
- The Bridge Alternative High School
- Brighton High School
- Charyl Stockwell Preparatory Academy Charter High School

=== Howell ===
- Howell High School
- Innovation Academy
- Kensington Woods Charter School (6-12)
- LEGACY Alternative High School

=== Pinckney ===
- The Link Alternative High School
- Pinckney High School

== Luce County ==
- Newberry High School, Newberry

== Mackinac County ==
- Cedarville High School, Cedarville
- Engadine Consolidated High School, Engadine
- LaSalle High School, St. Ignace
- Mackinac Island K-12 School, Mackinac Island

== Macomb County ==
- Anchor Bay High School, Fair Haven
- Austin Catholic High School, Chesterfield
- Center Line High School, Center Line
- Eisenhower High School, Shelby Township
- Fraser High School, Fraser
- L'Anse Creuse High School, Harrison Township
- Mount Clemens High School, Mount Clemens
- New Haven High School, New Haven
- Richmond High School, Richmond
- Romeo High School, Romeo
- Roseville High School, Roseville
- Utica High School, Utica

=== Armada ===
- Armada High School
- Macomb Academy of Arts and Science

=== Clinton Township ===
- Chippewa Valley High School
- Clintondale High School
- Frederick V. Pankow Center
- International Academy of Macomb
- Macomb Academy
- Mohegan High School

=== Eastpointe ===
- Eastpointe Alternative Center
- Eastpointe High School

=== Macomb ===
- Dakota High School
- Diane M. Pellerin Center
- L'Anse Creuse High School - North
- Lutheran High School North

=== St. Clair Shores ===
- Lake Shore High School
- Lakeview High School
- North Lake Alternative High School
- South Lake High School

=== Sterling Heights ===
- Gene L. Kilda Utica Academy for International Studies
- Henry Ford II High School
- Parkway Christian School
- Sterling Heights High School
- Stevenson High School
- Utica Alternative Learning Center
- Utica Center for Mathematics, Science and Technology
- Utica Center for Science and Industry
- Warren Career Preparation Center
- Warren Community High School
- Warren Consolidated School of Performing Arts

=== Warren ===
- Arts Academy in the Woods (6-12)
- Cousino High School
- De La Salle Collegiate High School
- Enterprise Alternative High School
- Fitzgerald High School
- Immaculate Conception Ukrainian Catholic High School
- Lincoln High School
- Michigan Collegiate Middle and High School
- Macomb Mathematics Science Technology Center
- Regina High School
- Success Alternative Academy
- Warren Mott High School
- Warren Woods Tower High School

== Manistee County ==
- Bear Lake High School, Bear Lake
- Brethren High School, Brethren
- Onekama High School, Onekama

=== Manistee ===
- Casman Academy Charter School (7-12)
- Manistee Catholic Central School (K-12)
- Manistee High School

== Marquette County ==
- Gwinn Middle/High School, Gwinn
- Marquette Senior High School, Marquette
- Negaunee High School, Negaunee
- Republic-Michigamme High School, Republic

=== Ishpeming ===
- INN Alternative Community School
- Ishpeming High School
- Westwood High School

== Mason County ==
- Free Soil Community High School (7-12), Free Soil
- Ludington High School, Ludington
- Mason County Central High School, Scottville
- Mason County Eastern High School, Custer

== Mecosta County ==
=== Big Rapids ===
- Big Rapids High School
- Crossroads Charter Academy

=== Morley ===
- Brockway Christian Academy (K-12)
- Morley Stanwood High School

=== Remus ===
- Chippewa Hills High School
- Mosaic Alternative School (7-12)

== Menominee County ==
- Carney-Nadeau School, Carney
- Hannahville Indian School, Harris Township
- Menominee High School, Menominee
- North Central Area High School, Powers
- Stephenson High School, Stephenson

== Midland County ==
- Coleman High School, Coleman
- Meridian Early College High School, Sanford

=== Midland ===
- Bullock Creek High School
- Calvary Baptist Academy (1-12)
- Herbert Henry Dow High School
- Midland High School
- Windover Alternative High School

== Missaukee County ==
- Lake City High School, Lake City

=== McBain ===
- McBain Rural Agricultural School (K-12)
- Northern Michigan Christian School (K-12)

== Monroe County ==
- Airport High School, Carleton
- Ida High School, Ida
- Mason High School, Erie
- Summerfield High School (7-12), Petersburg
- Whiteford High School, Ottawa Lake

=== Dundee ===
- Dundee High School
- Riverside Alternative Academy

=== Milan ===
- Milan High School
- Milan Alternative Education

=== Monroe ===
- Jefferson High School
- Meadow Montessori High School (PK-12)
- Monroe High School
- Orchard Center High School
- St. Mary Catholic Central High School

=== Temperance ===
- Bedford High School
- State Line Christian School (K-12)

== Montcalm County ==
- Beth Haven Baptist Academy (K-12), Sheridan
- Central Montcalm Middle/High School, Stanton
- Great Lakes Adventist Academy, Cedar Lake
- Greenville High School, Greenville
- Lakeview High School, Lakeview
- Montabella High School, Blanchard
- Tri County High School, Howard City

=== Carson City ===
- Carson City High School
- Fellowship Baptist Academy (K-12)

=== Vestaburg ===
- Vestaburg Community Alternative High School
- Vestaburg Middle/High School

== Montmorency County ==
- Atlanta High School, Atlanta
- Hillman Community Junior/Senior High School, Hillman

== Muskegon County ==
- Holton High School, Holton
- Montague High School, Montague
- Muskegon Heights Charter High School, Muskegon Heights
- North Muskegon High School, North Muskegon
- Ravenna High School, Ravenna
- Whitehall High School, Whitehall

=== Fruitport ===
- Calvary Christian Schools (K-12)
- Fruitport High School

=== Muskegon ===
- Innovative Learning Center
- Muskegon Catholic Central High School
- Muskegon Community Education Center
- Muskegon High School
- Oakridge High School
- Orchard View High School
- Reeths-Puffer High School

=== Norton Shores ===
- Mona Shores High School
- Western Michigan Christian High School

== Newaygo County ==
- Fremont High School, Fremont
- Grant High School, Grant
- Hesperia High School, Hesperia
- Newaygo High School, Newaygo
- White Cloud High School, White Cloud

== Oakland County ==
- Berkley High School, Berkley
- Brandon High School, Ortonville
- Clawson High School, Clawson
- Holly High School, Holly
- Milford High School, Highland
- St. Catherine of Siena Academy, Wixom
- St. Mary's Preparatory School, Orchard Lake
- Walled Lake Western High School, Walled Lake

=== Auburn Hills ===
- Auburn Hills Christian School (K-12)
- Avondale High School
- Oakland Christian School (K-12)

=== Beverly Hills ===
- Detroit Country Day School
- Groves High School

=== Birmingham ===
- Eton Academy (K-12)
- Lincoln Street Alternative High School
- Roeper School
- Seaholm High School

=== Bloomfield Hills ===
- Academy of the Sacred Heart High School (K-12)
- Bloomfield Christian School (K-12)
- Bloomfield Hills High School
- Brother Rice High School
- Cranbrook Kingswood School
- International Academy
- Marian High School
- Model Alternative High School (10-12)
- Wing Lake Developmental Center (PK-12)

=== Clarkston ===
- Clarkston High School
- Everest Catholic High School
- Renaissance Alternative High School

=== Commerce ===
- Harbor Alternative High School
- Walled Lake Central High School
- Walled Lake Northern High School

=== Farmington ===
- Farmington Central High School
- Farmington High School

=== Farmington Hills ===
- Mercy High School
- North Farmington High School
- Oakland Early College

=== Ferndale ===
- Ferndale High School
- Jardon Vocational School
- University High School

=== Hazel Park ===
- Hazel Park High School
- INVEST Roosevelt Alternative High School

=== Lake Orion ===
- Lake Orion Baptist School
- Lake Orion High School
- Learning Options High School

=== Madison Heights ===
- Bishop Foley Catholic High School
- Lamphere High School
- Madison High School
- Madison Preparatory School

=== Novi ===
- Detroit Catholic Central High School
- Novi Career Prep High School
- Novi Christian Academy (K-12)
- Novi High School

=== Oak Park ===
- Chaya Mushka High School
- Center for Advanced Studies and the Arts (CASA) (11-12)
- Nova Alternative Academy
- Oak Park High School
- Yeshiva Beth Yehudah
- Yeshivah Gedolah of Greater Detroit

=== Oxford ===
- Oxford Bridges Alternative High School
- Oxford Crossroads Day School (6-12)
- Oxford High School

=== Pontiac ===
- International Tech Academy (K-12)
- Notre Dame Preparatory School and Marist Academy (K-12)
- Pontiac Academy for Excellence (K-12)
- Pontiac High School

=== Rochester Hills ===
- Alternative Center for Education
- Lutheran High School Northwest
- Rochester Adams High School
- Rochester High School
- Rochester Hills Christian School (PK-12)
- Stoney Creek High School

=== Royal Oak ===
- Royal Oak High School
- Shrine Catholic High School
- Tri-County Educational Center
- Winston Churchill Community Education Center

=== South Lyon ===
- South Lyon East High School
- South Lyon High School

=== Southfield ===
- AGBU Alex and Marie Manoogian School (K-12)
- Akiva Hebrew Day School (K-12)
- Bradford Academy Charter School
- Kennedy Learning Center (K-12)
- Southfield Christian School (K-12)
- Southfield High School for the Arts & Technology
- University K-12 Academy (K-12)
- Yeshivas Darchei Torah (K-12)

=== Troy ===
- Athens High School
- Bethany Christian School (K-12)
- International Academy East
- Troy College and Career High School
- Troy High School

=== Waterford ===
- Oakdale Academy (PK-12)
- Our Lady of the Lakes High School
- Waterford Durant High School
- Waterford Kettering High School
- Waterford Mott High School

=== West Bloomfield ===
- The Jean and Samuel Frankel Jewish Academy of Metropolitan Detroit
- West Bloomfield High School

=== White Lake Township ===
- International Academy
- Lakeland High School

== Oceana County ==
- Hart High School, Hart
- Oceana High School, Rothbury
- Pentwater Public School (K-12), Pentwater
- Shelby High School, Shelby
- Walkerville Middle/High School (7-12), Walkerville

== Ogemaw County ==
- Ogemaw Heights High School, West Branch

== Ontonagon County ==
- Ewen-Trout Creek School, Ewen
- Ontonagon Area Senior High School, Ontonagon

== Osceola County ==
- Marion High School, Marion
- Pine River High School, LeRoy
- Reed City High School, Reed City

=== Evart ===
- Daystar Christian Academy (K-12)
- Evart High School

== Oscoda County ==
- Fairview High School, Fairview
- Mio-AuSable High School, Mio

== Otsego County ==
- Johannesburg-Lewiston High School, Johannesburg
- Vanderbilt Area School (K-12), Vanderbilt

=== Gaylord ===
- Gaylord High School
- St. Mary Cathedral High School

== Ottawa County ==
- Allendale High School, Allendale
- Coopersville High School, Coopersville
- Spring Lake High School, Spring Lake

=== Grand Haven ===
- Central Alternative High School
- Grand Haven High School

=== Holland ===
- Black River Public Charter School (K-12)
- Calvary Schools of Holland (K-12)
- Holland Christian High School
- Holland High School
- The Dunes Alternative High School
- West Ottawa High School

=== Hudsonville ===
- Hudsonville High School
- Unity Christian High School

=== Jenison ===
- Jenison High School
- Jenison Innovation Academy (K-12)

=== Zeeland ===
- Zeeland Christian School (K-12)
- Zeeland East High School
- Zeeland West High School

== Presque Isle County ==
- Posen High School, Posen
- Rogers City Middle & High School, Rogers City

=== Onaway ===
- Onaway High School
- Presque Isle Academy Charter School

== Roscommon County ==
=== Houghton Lake ===
- Houghton Lake Community Education
- Houghton Lake Junior/Senior High School

=== Roscommon ===
- Immanuel Christian School (K-12)
- Roscommon High School

== Saginaw County ==
- Bridgeport High School, Bridgeport
- Chesaning Union High School, Chesaning
- Frankenmuth High School, Frankenmuth
- Freeland High School, Freeland
- Hemlock High School, Hemlock
- Merrill High School, Merrill
- St. Charles High School, St. Charles

=== Birch Run ===
- Birch Run High School
- Progressive High School

=== Saginaw ===
- Bridgeport Baptist Academy (K-12)
- Buena Vista High School
- Carrollton High School
- Community Baptist Christian School
- Michigan Lutheran Seminary
- Nouvel Catholic Central High School
- Omni Alternative High School
- Saginaw Arts and Sciences Academy
- Saginaw Career Complex (11-12)
- Saginaw United High School
- The Success Academy (5-12)
- Swan Valley Alternative Education
- Swan Valley High School
- Valley Lutheran High School

=== Saginaw Township ===
- Heritage High School
- Mackinaw Alternative High School

== St. Clair County ==
- Capac Junior/Senior High School, Capac
- Memphis Junior/Senior High School, Memphis
- St. Clair Campus (6-12), St. Clair
- Yale High School, Yale

=== Clay Township ===
- Algonac Junior/Senior High School
- Algonac Alternative High School

=== Kimball ===
- Landmark Academy (K-12)
- New Life Christian Academy (K-12)

=== Marine City ===
- Cardinal Mooney Catholic College Preparatory
- Marine City High School

=== Marysville ===
- Marysville High School
- St. Clair Technical Education Center

=== Port Huron ===
- Blue Water Middle College (7-12)
- Phoenix Alternative Academy
- Port Huron High School
- Port Huron Northern High School

== St. Joseph County ==
- Burr Oak High School, Burr Oak
- Centreville High School, Centreville
- Colon High School, Colon
- Constantine High School, Constantine
- Howardsville Christian School (K-12), Marcellus
- Mendon Junior/Senior High School, Mendon
- Three Rivers High School, Three Rivers
- White Pigeon Junior/Senior High School, White Pigeon

=== Sturgis ===
- Lake Area Christian School (K-12)
- Sturgis High School

== Sanilac County ==
- Brown City High School, Brown City (7-12)
- Deckerville High School, Deckerville
- Marlette High School, Marlette
- Peck Junior/Senior High School, Peck
- Sandusky Junior/Senior High School, Sandusky

=== Carsonville ===
- Carsonville-Port Sanilac Junior/Senior High School
- Carsonville-Port Sanilac Alternative Learning Center

=== Croswell ===
- Croswell-Lexington High School
- Pioneer Alternative High School

== Schoolcraft County ==
=== Manistique ===
- Jack Regue Alternative High School
- Manistique High School

== Shiawassee County ==
- Byron High School, Byron
- Corunna High School, Corunna
- Durand Area High School, Durand
- Laingsburg High School, Laingsburg
- Morrice Junior/Senior High School, Morrice
- New Lothrop High School (7-12), New Lothrop
- Perry High School, Perry

=== Owosso ===
- Life In Christ Christian School (PK-12)
- Lincoln Alternative High School
- Owosso High School
- Spring Vale Christian School (PK-12)

== Tuscola County ==
- Akron-Fairgrove Junior/Senior High School, Fairgrove
- Cass City High School, Cass City
- Deford Christian Academy (K-12), Deford
- Kingston High School (7-12), Kingston
- Mayville High School, Mayville
- Millington Jr./Sr. High School, Millington
- Reese High School (6-12), Reese
- Unionville-Sebewaing Area High School, Sebewaing

=== Caro ===
- Caro Alternative High School
- Caro High School

=== Vassar ===
- Juniata Christian School (K-12)
- Vassar Middle/High School

== Van Buren County ==
- Covert High School, Covert
- Decatur High School, Decatur
- Gobles High School, Gobles
- Lawrence Junior/Senior High School, Lawrence
- Lawton High School, Lawton
- Mattawan High School, Mattawan

=== Bangor ===
- Bangor Career Academy
- Bangor High School

=== Bloomingdale ===
- Bloomingdale Middle/High School
- STRIVE Academy

=== Hartford ===
- Hartford Alternative Education
- Hartford High School

=== Paw Paw ===
- Cedar Street Alternative Campus
- Paw Paw High School

=== South Haven ===
- South Haven Alliance Campus
- South Haven High School

== Washtenaw County ==
- Chelsea High School, Chelsea
- Manchester Junior/Senior High School, Manchester
- Whitmore Lake High School, Whitmore Lake

=== Ann Arbor ===
- Ann Arbor Christian School (PK-12)
- Ann Arbor Academy (4-12)
- Central Academy (K-12)
- Clonlara School (K-12)
- Community High School
- Fr. Gabriel Richard High School
- Greenhills School
- Huron High School
- Michigan Islamic Academy (PK-11)
- Pathways to Success Academic Campus
- Pioneer High School
- Rudolf Steiner of Ann Arbor (K-12)
- Skyline High School
- Washtenaw Technical Middle College

=== Dexter ===
- Dexter High School
- Dexter International Academy (PK-12)

=== Saline ===
- Saline Alternative High School
- Saline High School
- Washtenaw Christian Academy (K-12)

=== Ypsilanti ===
- Arbor Preparatory High School
- Lincoln High School
- Ypsilanti Community High School
- Ypsilanti A.C.C.E. Program

== Wayne County ==
- Belleville High School, Belleville
- Covenant School Spectrum (7-12), Highland Park
- Flat Rock Community High School, Flat Rock
- Grosse Ile High School, Grosse Ile
- Grosse Pointe North High School, Grosse Pointe Woods
- Grosse Pointe South High School, Grosse Pointe Farms
- Huron High School, New Boston
- Lincoln Park High School, Lincoln Park
- Northville High School, Northville
- Oscar A. Carlson High School, Gibraltar
- River Rouge High School, River Rouge
- Trenton High School, Trenton
- University Liggett School, Grosse Pointe

=== Allen Park ===
- Allen Park High School
- Cabrini High School
- Inter-City Baptist School (K-12)

=== Brownstown ===
- Maple Grove Alternative High School
- Woodhaven High School

=== Canton ===
- Canton High School
- Canton Preparatory High School (7-12)
- Plymouth Christian Academy (K-12)
- Plymouth High School
- Salem High School

=== Dearborn ===
- Advanced Technology Academy (K-12)
- Dearborn Center for Math, Science and Technology
- Dearborn High School
- Divine Child High School
- Edsel Ford High School
- Ford Academy
- Fordson High School
- Henry Ford Collegiate Academy
- Henry Ford Early College
- Michael Berry Career Center
- Newcomer College Prep Academy

=== Dearborn Heights ===
- Annapolis High School
- Clara B. Ford Academy
- Crestwood High School
- Dearborn Magnet High School
- Robichaud High School
- Star International Academy (K-12)
- WISE Islamic Academy (PK-12)

=== Detroit ===
==== Detroit Public Schools zoned/technical centers ====
- Breithaupt Career & Tech Center
- Central High School
- Cody High School
- Denby High School
- Ford High School
- Golightly Career & Tech Center
- Mumford High School
- Northwestern High School
- Pershing High School
- Randolph Career & Tech Center
- Southeastern High School
- Western International High School

==== Detroit Public Schools magnet/specialized ====
- Academy of the Americas (PK-12)
- Cass Technical High School
- Communication & Media Arts High School
- Crockett Midtown High School of Science & Medicine
- Davis Aerospace Technical High School
- Detroit High School for Technology
- Detroit International Academy for Young Women (PK-12)
- Detroit Lions Alternative Academy (6-12)
- Detroit School of Arts
- Douglass Academy for Young Men (6-12)
- East English Village Preparatory Academy
- King High School
- Osborn High School
- Renaissance High School
- West Side Academy

==== Charter schools ====
- Aztec Eagles Academy
- Covenant Schools (Central, East, Southwest)
- Detroit Edison Public School Academy (PK-12)
- Detroit Leadership Academy (PK-12)
- Detroit Service Learning Academy (PK-12)
- Frontier International Academy
- Hope of Detroit Academy
- Jalen Rose Leadership Academy
- Lincoln-King High School
- Oakland International Academy (PK-12)
- Pathways Academy (7-12)
- Universal Academy (PK-12)
- University Preparatory Academy (K-12)
- Voyageur Academy (PK-12)
- WAY Academy (7-12) (Southwest, West)

==== Private schools ====
- Al-Ikhlas Training Academy (K-12)
- Benedictine High School
- Holy Redeemer High School
- Loyola High School
- University of Detroit Jesuit High School and Academy
- Westside Christian Academy (K-12)

=== Ecorse ===
- Ecorse Community High School
- Vincent J. Parks Alternative Education Center

=== Garden City ===
- Burger Baylor School (PK-12)
- Cambridge Alternative High School
- Garden City High School

=== Hamtramck ===
- Frontier International Academy (6-12)
- Hamtramck High School
- Horizon Alternative High School

=== Harper Woods ===
- Chandler Park Academy
- Harper Woods High School
- Regina High School

=== Inkster ===
- Peterson-Warren Academy (K-12)
- Westwood North Alternative Academy

=== Livonia ===
- Churchill High School
- Clarenceville High School
- Franklin High School
- Ladywood High School
- Livonia Career Technical Center
- Stevenson High School

=== Melvindale ===
- Academy for Business and Technology (6-12)
- Melvindale High School

=== Redford ===
- Keeler School (K-12)
- Redford Union High School
- SOAR Academic Institute
- Thurston High School
- Veritas Alternative Education (6-12)

=== Riverview ===
- Gabriel Richard High School
- Riverview Community High School

=== Romulus ===
- Romulus Senior High School
- Summit Academy North (K-12)

=== Southgate ===
- Asher Alternative High School
- Southgate Anderson High School

=== Taylor ===
- Taylor Career Center
- Taylor High School
- Taylor Preparatory High School

=== Wayne ===
- Wayne Memorial High School
- Wayne-Westland Innovative Academy

=== Westland ===
- Hope Christian Academy (6-12)
- John Glenn High School
- Lutheran High School Westland
- Universal Learning Academy
- William D. Ford Career/Technical Center

=== Wyandotte ===
- Our Lady of Mount Carmel High School
- Roosevelt High School

== Wexford County ==
- Buckley Community School (K-12), Buckley
- Manton High School, Manton
- Mesick Consolidated High School, Mesick

=== Cadillac ===
- Cadillac Heritage Christian (K-12)
- Cadillac High School
- Cadillac Innovation High School

== See also ==
- List of school districts in Michigan
- List of schools in the Roman Catholic Archdiocese of Detroit
