= List of local education agency districts in Michigan =

This is a complete listing of Local Education Agency (LEA), or public school districts in the state of Michigan.

- For intermediate school districts (ISDs), see list of intermediate school districts in Michigan.
- For public school academy (PSA) districts, which include charter schools, see list of public school academy districts in Michigan.

All LEA school districts are independent governmental agencies as per the U.S. Census Bureau.

== Allegan Area Educational Service Agency ==
=== Allegan County ===
- Allegan Public Schools
- Fennville Public Schools
- Glenn Public School District
- Hopkins Public Schools
- Martin Public Schools (also extends into Barry County)
- Otsego Public Schools (also extends into Kalamazoo and Van Buren Counties)
- Plainwell Community Schools (also extends into Barry and Kalamazoo Counties)
- Wayland Union Schools (also extends into Barry and Kent Counties)

== Alpena–Montmorency–Alcona Education Service District ==
=== Alcona County ===
- Alcona Community Schools

=== Alpena County ===
- Alpena Public Schools (also extends into Presque Isle County)

=== Montmorency County ===
- Atlanta Community Schools
- Hillman Community Schools (also extends into Alpena and Presque Isle Counties)

== Barry Intermediate School District ==
=== Barry County ===
- Delton Kellogg Schools (also extends into Allegan County)
- Hastings Area School System (also extends into Calhoun County)

== Bay–Arenac Intermediate School District ==
=== Arenac County ===
- Au Gres-Sims School District
- Standish-Sterling Community Schools (also extends into Bay and Gladwin Counties)

=== Bay County ===
- Bangor Township Schools
- Bay City Public Schools (also extends into Midland and Saginaw Counties)
- Essexville-Hampton Public Schools
- Pinconning Area Schools (also extends into Gladwin County)

== Berrien Regional Educational Service Agency ==
=== Berrien County ===
- Benton Harbor Area Schools
- Berrien Springs Public Schools
- Brandywine Community Schools (also extends into Cass County)
- Bridgman Public Schools
- Buchanan Community Schools
- Coloma Community Schools (also extends into Van Buren County)
- Eau Claire Public Schools (also extends into Cass County)
- Hagar Township School District 6
- Lakeshore Public Schools
- New Buffalo Area Schools
- Niles Community Schools (also extends into Cass County)
- River Valley School District
- Sodus Township School District 5
- St. Joseph Public Schools
- Watervliet Public Schools

== Branch Intermediate School District ==
=== Branch County ===
- Bronson Community Schools (also extends into St. Joseph County)
- Coldwater Community Schools
- Quincy Community Schools (also extends into Hillsdale County)

== C.O.O.R. Intermediate School District ==
=== Crawford County ===
- Crawford AuSable School District (also extends into Kalkaska and Otsego Counties)

=== Ogemaw County ===
- West Branch-Rose City Area Schools (also extends into Gladwin and Oscoda Counties)

=== Oscoda County ===
- Fairview Area School District (also extends into Alcona County)
- Mio-AuSable Schools

=== Roscommon County ===
- Houghton Lake Community Schools (also extends into Missaukee County)
- Roscommon Area Public Schools (also extends into Crawford County)

== Calhoun Intermediate School District ==
=== Calhoun County ===
- Athens Area Schools (also extends into Branch, Kalamazoo and St. Joseph Counties)
- Battle Creek Public Schools
- Harper Creek Community Schools
- Homer Community Schools (also extends into Branch, Hillsdale and Jackson Counties)
- Lakeview School District (Calhoun)
- Mar Lee School District
- Marshall Public Schools (also extends into Jackson County)
- Pennfield Schools
- Tekonsha Community Schools
- Union City Community Schools (also extends into Branch County, where the district offices are located)

=== Eaton County ===
- Bellevue Community Schools (also extends into Barry and Calhoun Counties)
- Olivet Community Schools (also extends into Calhoun County)

== Charlevoix–Emmet Intermediate School District ==
=== Antrim County ===
- Central Lake Public Schools
- Ellsworth Community School (also extends into Charlevoix County)

=== Charlevoix County ===
- Beaver Island Community School
- Boyne City Public Schools (also extends into Antrim County)
- Boyne Falls Public School District (also extends into Antrim County)
- Charlevoix Public Schools (also extends into Antrim County)
- East Jordan Public Schools (also extends into Antrim County)

=== Emmet County ===
- Alanson Public Schools
- Harbor Springs Public School District
- Pellston Public Schools (also extends into Cheboygan County)
- Public Schools of Petoskey (also extends into Charlevoix County)

== Cheboygan–Otsego–Presque Isle Education Service District ==
=== Cheboygan County ===
- Cheboygan Area Schools
- Inland Lakes Schools
- Mackinaw City Public Schools (also extends into Emmet County, where the district offices are located)
- Wolverine Community Schools

=== Otsego County ===
- Gaylord Community Schools (also extends into Antrim County)
- Johannesburg-Lewiston Area Schools (also extends into Montmorency and Oscoda Counties)
- Vanderbilt Area Schools (also extends into Charlevoix County)

=== Presque Isle County ===
- Onaway Area Schools (also extends into Cheboygan County)
- Posen Consolidated School District No. 9
- Rogers City Area Schools

== Clare–Gladwin Regional Education Service District ==
=== Clare County ===
- Clare Public Schools (also extends into Isabella County)
- Farwell Area Schools (also extends into Isabella County)
- Harrison Community Schools (also extends into Gladwin County)

=== Gladwin County ===
- Beaverton Schools (also extends into Clare County)
- Gladwin Community Schools (also extends into Clare County)

== Clinton County Regional Educational Service Agency ==
=== Clinton County ===
- Bath Community Schools (also extends into Shiawassee County)
- Dewitt Public Schools
- Fowler Public Schools
- Ovid-Elsie Area Schools (also extends into Gratiot, Saginaw and Shiawassee Counties)
- Pewamo-Westphalia Community Schools (also extends into Ionia County)
- St. Johns Public Schools (also extends into Gratiot County)

== Copper Country Intermediate School District ==
=== Baraga County ===
- Arvon Township School District
- Baraga Area Schools (also extends into Houghton County)
- L'Anse Area Schools (also extends into Houghton and Ontonagon Counties)

=== Houghton County ===
- Adams Township School District (also extends into Ontonagon County)
- Chassell Township School District
- Dollar Bay-Tamarack City Area K-12 School
- Elm River Township School District
- Hancock Public Schools
- Houghton-Portage Township School District
- Lake Linden-Hubbell School District (also extends into Keweenaw County)
- Public Schools of Calumet-Laurium-Keweenaw (also extends into Keweenaw County)
- Stanton Township Public Schools

=== Keweenaw County ===
- Grant Township School District 2

== Delta–Schoolcraft Intermediate School District ==
=== Delta County ===
- Bark River-Harris School District (also extends into Menominee County, where the district offices are located)
- Big Bay de Noc School District (also extends into Schoolcraft County)
- Escanaba Area Public Schools (also extends into Marquette County)
- Gladstone Area Public Schools
- Mid Peninsula School District (also extends into Marquette County)
- Rapid River Public Schools

=== Schoolcraft County ===
- Manistique Area Schools

== Dickinson–Iron Intermediate School District ==
=== Dickinson County ===
- Breitung Township Schools
- Iron Mountain Public Schools
- North Dickinson County Schools
- Norway-Vulcan Area Schools (also extends into Menominee County)

=== Iron County ===
- Forest Park School District
- West Iron County Public Schools

== Eastern Upper Peninsula Intermediate School District ==
=== Chippewa County ===
- Brimley Area Schools
- DeTour Area Schools
- Pickford Public Schools (also extends into Mackinac County)
- Rudyard Area Schools (also extends into Mackinac County)
- Sault Ste. Marie Area Schools
- Whitefish Township Schools

=== Luce County ===
- Tahquamenon Area Schools (also extends into Chippewa, Mackinac and Schoolcraft Counties)

=== Mackinac County ===
- Bois Blanc Pines School District
- Engadine Consolidated Schools
- Les Cheneaux Community Schools
- Mackinac Island Public Schools
- Moran Township School District
- St. Ignace Area Schools

== Eaton Regional Education Service Agency ==
=== Eaton County ===
- Charlotte Public Schools
- Eaton Rapids Public Schools (also extends into Ingham County)
- Grand Ledge Public Schools (also extends into Clinton and Ionia Counties)
- Maple Valley Schools (also extends into Barry County)
- Oneida Township School District 3
- Potterville Public Schools

== Genesee Intermediate School District ==
=== Genesee County ===
- Atherton Community Schools
- Beecher Community School District
- Bendle Public Schools
- Bentley Community School District
- Carman-Ainsworth Community Schools
- Clio Area School District (also extends into Saginaw County)
- Davison Community Schools (also extends into Lapeer County)
- Fenton Area Public Schools (also extends into Livingston and Oakland Counties)
- School District of the City of Flint
- Flushing Community Schools
- Genesee School District
- Goodrich Area Schools (also extends into Lapeer and Oakland Counties)
- Grand Blanc Community Schools (also extends into Oakland County)
- Kearsley Community Schools
- Lake Fenton Community Schools
- LakeVille Community School District (also extends into Lapeer County)
- Linden Community Schools (also extends into Livingston County)
- Montrose Community Schools (also extends into Saginaw County)
- Mt. Morris Consolidated Schools
- Swartz Creek Community Schools
- Westwood Heights Schools

== Gogebic–Ontonagon Intermediate School District ==
=== Gogebic County ===
- Bessemer Area School District
- Ironwood Area Schools of Gogebic County
- Wakefield-Marenisco School District
- Watersmeet Township School District

=== Ontonagon County ===
- Ewen-Trout Creek Consolidated School District (also extends into Houghton County)
- Ontonagon Area School District

== Gratiot–Isabella Regional Education Service District ==
=== Gratiot County ===
- Alma Public Schools (also extends into Montcalm County)
- Ashley Community Schools (also extends into Saginaw County)
- Breckenridge Community Schools (also extends into Midland and Saginaw Counties)
- Fulton Schools (also extends into Clinton County)
- Ithaca Public Schools
- St. Louis Public Schools (also extends into Isabella and Midland Counties)

=== Isabella County ===
- Beal City Public Schools
- Mount Pleasant Public Schools
- Shepherd Public Schools

== Heritage Southwest Intermediate School District ==
=== Cass County ===
- Cassopolis Public Schools
- Dowagiac Union School District (also extends into Berrien and Van Buren Counties)
- Edwardsburg Public Schools
- Marcellus Community Schools (also extends into St. Joseph County)

== Hillsdale Intermediate School District ==
=== Hillsdale County ===
- Camden-Frontier Schools (also extends into Branch County)
- Hillsdale Community Schools
- Jonesville Community Schools (also extends into Jackson County)
- Litchfield Community Schools (also extends into Branch, Calhoun and Jackson Counties)
- North Adams-Jerome Public Schools (also extends into Jackson County)
- Pittsford Area Schools
- Reading Community Schools (also extends into Branch County)
- Waldron Area Schools

== Huron Intermediate School District ==
=== Huron County ===
- Bad Axe Public Schools
- Caseville Public Schools
- Church School District
- Colfax Township School District 1F
- Elkton-Pigeon-Bay Port Laker Schools
- Harbor Beach Community Schools (also extends into Sanilac County)
- North Huron School District
- Owendale-Gagetown Area School District (also extends into Tuscola County)
- Sigel Township School District 3F
- Sigel Township School District 4F
- Ubly Community Schools (also extends into Sanilac County)
- Verona Township School District 1F

== Ingham Intermediate School District ==
=== Ingham County ===
- Dansville Schools
- East Lansing School District (also extends into Clinton County)
- Haslett Public Schools (also extends into Clinton and Shiawassee Counties)
- Holt Public Schools (also extends into Eaton County)
- Lansing Public School District (also extends into Clinton and Eaton Counties)
- Leslie Public Schools (also extends into Jackson County)
- Mason Public Schools (Ingham)
- Okemos Public Schools
- Stockbridge Community Schools (also extends into Jackson, Livingston and Washtenaw Counties)
- Waverly Community Schools (also extends into Eaton, where the district offices are located, and Clinton Counties)
- Webberville Community Schools (also extends into Livingston County)
- Williamston Community Schools

== Ionia Intermediate School District ==
=== Ionia County ===
- Belding Area Schools (also extends into Kent and Montcalm Counties)
- Berlin Township School District 3
- Easton Township School District 6
- Ionia Public Schools
- Ionia Township School District 2
- Lakewood Public Schools (also extends into Barry, Eaton and Kent Counties)
- Portland Public Schools (also extends into Clinton County)
- Saranac Community Schools

== Iosco Regional Educational Service Agency ==
=== Iosco County ===
- Hale Area Schools (also extends into Ogemaw County)
- Oscoda Area Schools (also extends into Alcona County)
- Tawas Area Schools (also extends into Arenac County)
- Whittemore-Prescott Area Schools (also extends into Arenac and Ogemaw Counties)

== Jackson Intermediate School District ==
=== Jackson County ===
- Columbia School District (also extends into Hillsdale, Lenawee and Washtenaw Counties)
- Concord Community Schools
- East Jackson Community Schools
- Grass Lake Community Schools (also extends into Washtenaw County)
- Hanover-Horton School District (also extends into Hillsdale County)
- Jackson Public Schools
- Michigan Center School District
- Napoleon Community Schools
- Northwest Community Schools (also extends into Ingham County)
- Springport Public Schools (also extends into Calhoun, Eaton and Ingham Counties)
- Vandercook Lake Public Schools
- Western School District

== Kalamazoo Regional Educational Service Agency ==
=== Kalamazoo County ===
- Climax-Scotts Community Schools (also extends into Calhoun County)
- Comstock Public Schools
- Galesburg-Augusta Community Schools
- Gull Lake Community Schools (also extends into Barry and Calhoun Counties)
- Kalamazoo Public Schools
- Parchment School District
- Portage Public Schools
- Schoolcraft Community Schools
- Vicksburg Community Schools (also extends into St. Joseph County)

== Kent Intermediate School District ==
=== Barry County ===
- Thornapple Kellogg School District (also extends into Allegan, Ionia and Kent Counties)

=== Kent County ===
- Byron Center Public Schools
- Caledonia Community Schools (also extends into Allegan and Barry Counties)
- Cedar Springs Public Schools (also extends into Newaygo County)
- Comstock Park Public Schools
- East Grand Rapids Public Schools
- Forest Hills Public Schools
- Godfrey-Lee Public Schools
- Godwin Heights Public Schools
- Grand Rapids Public Schools
- Grandville Public Schools (also extends into Ottawa County)
- Kelloggsville Public Schools
- Kenowa Hills Public Schools (also extends into Ottawa County)
- Kent City Community Schools (also extends into Muskegon, Newaygo and Ottawa Counties)
- Kentwood Public Schools
- Lowell Area Schools (also extends into Ionia County)
- Northview Public Schools
- Rockford Public Schools
- Sparta Area Schools (also extends into Ottawa County)
- Wyoming Public Schools

== Lapeer Intermediate School District ==
=== Lapeer County ===
- Almont Community Schools (also extends into Macomb, Oakland and St. Clair Counties)
- Dryden Community Schools
- Imlay City Community Schools
- Lapeer Community Schools
- North Branch Area Schools

== Lenawee Intermediate School District ==
=== Lenawee County ===
- Addison Community Schools (also extends into Hillsdale and Jackson Counties)
- Adrian Public Schools
- Blissfield Community Schools (also extends into Monroe County)
- Britton Deerfield School District (also extends into Monroe County)
- Clinton Community Schools (also extends into Washtenaw County)
- Hudson Area Schools (also extends into Hillsdale County)
- Madison School District (Lenawee County, Michigan)
- Morenci Area Schools
- Onsted Community Schools
- Sand Creek Community Schools
- Tecumseh Public Schools

== Livingston Educational Service Agency ==
=== Livingston County ===
- Brighton Area Schools
- Fowlerville Community Schools (also extends into Ingham and Shiawassee Counties)
- Hartland Consolidated Schools
- Howell Public Schools
- Pinckney Community Schools (also extends into Washtenaw County)

== Macomb Intermediate School District ==
=== Macomb County ===
- Anchor Bay School District (also extends into St. Clair County, where the district offices are located)
- Armada Area Schools (also extends into St. Clair County)
- Center Line Public Schools
- Chippewa Valley Schools
- Clintondale Community Schools
- Eastpointe Community Schools
- Fitzgerald Public Schools
- Fraser Public Schools
- Lake Shore Public Schools (Macomb)
- Lakeview Public Schools (Macomb)
- L'Anse Creuse Public Schools
- Mount Clemens Community School District
- New Haven Community Schools
- Richmond Community Schools (also extends into St. Clair County)
- Romeo Community Schools (also extends into Oakland County)
- Roseville Community Schools
- South Lake Schools
- Utica Community Schools
- Van Dyke Public Schools
- Warren Consolidated Schools (also extends into Oakland County)
- Warren Woods Public Schools

== Manistee Intermediate School District ==
=== Manistee County ===
- Bear Lake School District
- Kaleva Norman Dickson Schools (also extends into Lake and Mason Counties)
- Manistee Area Public Schools (also extends into Mason County)
- Onekama Consolidated Schools

== Marquette–Alger Regional Educational Service Agency ==
=== Alger County ===
- AuTrain-Onota Public Schools
- Burt Township School District
- Munising Public Schools (also extends into Schoolcraft County)
- Superior Central School District

=== Marquette County ===
- Gwinn Area Community Schools
- Ishpeming Public School District No. 1
- Marquette Area Public Schools
- Negaunee Public Schools
- NICE Community School District (also extends into Baraga County)
- Powell Township Schools
- Republic-Michigamme Schools
- Wells Township School District

== Mecosta–Osceola Intermediate School District ==
=== Mecosta County ===
- Big Rapids Public Schools (also extends into Newaygo County)
- Chippewa Hills School District (also extends into Isabella and Osceola Counties)
- Morley Stanwood Community Schools (also extends into Montcalm and Newaygo Counties)

=== Osceola County ===
- Evart Public Schools (also extends into Clare and Mecosta Counties)
- Reed City Area Public Schools (also extends into Lake, Mecosta and Newaygo Counties)

== Menominee Intermediate School District ==
=== Menominee County ===
- Carney-Nadeau Public Schools
- Menominee Area Public Schools
- North Central Area Schools
- Stephenson Area Public Schools

== Midland County Educational Service Agency ==
=== Midland County ===
- Bullock Creek School District
- Coleman Community Schools (also extends into Isabella County)
- Meridian Public Schools
- Midland Public Schools

== Monroe Intermediate School District ==
=== Monroe County ===
- Airport Community Schools (also extends into Wayne County)
- Bedford Public Schools
- Dundee Community Schools
- Ida Public Schools
- Jefferson Schools (Monroe)
- Mason Consolidated Schools (Monroe)
- Monroe Public Schools
- Summerfield Schools
- Whiteford Agricultural School District of the Counties of Lenawee and Monroe (also extends into Lenawee County)

== Montcalm Area Intermediate School District ==
=== Montcalm County ===
- Carson City-Crystal Area Schools (also extends into Clinton, Gratiot and Ionia Counties)
- Central Montcalm Public Schools (also extends into Ionia Counties)
- Greenville Public Schools (also extends into Ionia and Kent Counties)
- Lakeview Community Schools (Montcalm) (also extends into Kent and Mecosta Counties)
- Montabella Community Schools (also extends into Isabella and Mecosta Counties)
- Tri County Area Schools (also extends into Kent and Newaygo Counties)
- Vestaburg Community Schools (also extends into Gratiot and Isabella Counties)

== Muskegon Area Intermediate School District ==
=== Muskegon County ===
- Fruitport Community Schools (also extends into Ottawa County)
- Holton Public Schools (also extends into Newaygo and Oceana Counties)
- Mona Shores Public School District
- Montague Area Public Schools (also extends into Oceana County)
- Muskegon Heights School District
- Muskegon Public Schools
- North Muskegon Public Schools
- Oakridge Public Schools (also extends into Newaygo County)
- Orchard View Schools
- Ravenna Public Schools (also extends into Ottawa County)
- Reeths-Puffer Schools
- Whitehall District Schools

== Newaygo County Regional Educational Service Agency ==
=== Newaygo County ===
- Big Jackson School District
- Fremont Public School District (also extends into Muskegon and Oceana Counties)
- Grant Public School District (also extends into Kent and Muskegon Counties)
- Hesperia Community Schools (also extends into Oceana County)
- Newaygo Public Schools
- White Cloud Public Schools

== Northwest Educational Services ==
=== Antrim County ===
- Alba Public Schools
- Bellaire Public Schools
- Elk Rapids Schools (also extends into Grand Traverse and Kalkaska Counties)
- Mancelona Public Schools (also extends into Kalkaska Counties)

=== Benzie County ===
- Benzie County Central Schools (also extends into Grand Traverse, Manistee and Wexford Counties)
- Frankfort-Elberta Area Schools

=== Grand Traverse County ===
- Buckley Community Schools (also extends into Wexford County, where the district offices are located)
- Kingsley Area Schools (also extends into Wexford County)
- Traverse City Area Public Schools (also extends into Benzie and Leelanau Counties)

=== Kalkaska County ===
- Excelsior Township School District 1
- Forest Area Community Schools (also extends into Grand Traverse County)
- Kalkaska Public Schools

=== Leelanau County ===
- Glen Lake Community Schools (also extends into Benzie County)
- Leland Public School District
- Northport Public School District
- Suttons Bay Public Schools

== Oakland Schools ==
=== Oakland County ===
- Avondale School District
- Berkley School District
- Birmingham Public Schools
- Bloomfield Hills Schools
- Brandon School District in the Counties of Oakland and Lapeer (also extends into Genesee and Lapeer Counties)
- Clarenceville School District (also extends into Wayne County, where the district offices are located)
- Clarkston Community School District
- Clawson Public Schools
- Farmington Public School District
- Ferndale Public Schools
- School District of the City of Hazel Park
- Holly Area Schools
- Huron Valley Schools (also extends into Livingston County)
- Lake Orion Community Schools
- Lamphere Public Schools
- Madison District Public Schools
- Novi Community School District
- School District of the City of Oak Park
- Oxford Community Schools (also extends into Lapeer and Macomb Counties)
- Pontiac City School District
- Rochester Community School District (also extends into Macomb County)
- Royal Oak Schools
- South Lyon Community Schools (also extends into Livingston and Washtenaw Counties)
- Southfield Public School District
- Troy School District
- Walled Lake Consolidated Schools
- Waterford School District
- West Bloomfield School District

== Ottawa Area Intermediate School District ==
=== Allegan County ===
- Hamilton Community Schools
- Saugatuck Public Schools

=== Ottawa County ===
- Allendale Public Schools
- Coopersville Area Public Schools (also extends into Muskegon County)
- Grand Haven Area Public Schools (also extends into Muskegon County)
- Holland City School District (also extends into Allegan County)
- Hudsonville Public School District (also extends into Allegan County)
- Jenison Public Schools
- Spring Lake Public Schools
- West Ottawa Public Schools
- Zeeland Public Schools (also extends into Allegan County)

== Saginaw Intermediate School District ==
=== Saginaw County ===
- Birch Run Area Schools (also extends into Genesee County)
- Bridgeport-Spaulding Community School District
- Carrollton Public Schools
- Chesaning Union Schools (also extends into Shiawassee County)
- Frankenmuth School District (also extends into Tuscola County)
- Freeland Community School District (also extends into Bay and Midland Counties)
- Hemlock Public School District (also extends into Midland County)
- Merrill Community Schools (also extends into Gratiot and Midland Counties)
- Saginaw Township Community Schools
- School District of the City of Saginaw
- St. Charles Community Schools
- Swan Valley School District

== Sanilac Intermediate School District ==
=== Sanilac County ===
- Brown City Community Schools (also extends into Lapeer County)
- Carsonville-Port Sanilac Schools
- Croswell-Lexington Community Schools (also extends into St. Clair County)
- Deckerville Community Schools
- Marlette Community Schools (also extends into Lapeer and Tuscola Counties)
- Peck Community School District
- Sandusky Community Schools

== Shiawassee Regional Educational Service District ==
=== Shiawassee County ===
- Byron Area Schools (also extends into Genesee and Livingston Counties)
- Corunna Public Schools
- Durand Area Schools (also extends into Genesee County)
- Laingsburg Community Schools (also extends into Clinton County)
- Morrice Area Schools (also extends into Ingham and Livingston Counties)
- New Lothrop Area Public Schools (also extends into Saginaw Counties)
- Owosso Public Schools
- Perry Public Schools (also extends into Ingham County)

== St. Clair County Regional Educational Service Agency ==
=== St. Clair County ===
- Algonac Community School District
- Capac Community Schools (also extends into Lapeer County)
- East China School District
- Marysville Public Schools
- Memphis Community Schools (also extends into Macomb County)
- Port Huron Area School District
- Yale Public Schools (also extends into Sanilac County)

== St. Joseph County Intermediate School District ==
=== St. Joseph County ===
- Burr Oak Community School District
- Centreville Public Schools
- Colon Community School District (also extends into Branch and Kalamazoo Counties)
- Constantine Public Schools (also extends into Cass County)
- Mendon Community Schools (also extends into Kalamazoo County)
- Nottawa Community School
- Sturgis Public Schools
- Three Rivers Community Schools (also extends into Cass County)
- White Pigeon Community Schools (also extends into Cass County)

== State of Michigan ==
- State School Reform/Redesign District (offices located in Ingham County)

== Tuscola Intermediate School District ==
=== Tuscola County ===
- Akron-Fairgrove Schools
- Caro Community Schools
- Cass City Public Schools (also extends into Huron and Sanilac Counties)
- Kingston Community School District
- Mayville Community Schools (also extends into Lapeer County)
- Millington Community Schools (also extends into Genesee County)
- Reese Public School District (also extends into Bay and Saginaw Counties)
- Unionville-Sebewaing Area School District (also extends into Huron County)
- Vassar Public Schools

== Van Buren Intermediate School District ==
=== Van Buren County ===
- Bangor Public Schools
- Bangor Township School District 8
- Bloomingdale Public Schools (also extends into Allegan County)
- Covert Public Schools (also extends into Berrien County)
- Decatur Public Schools (also extends into Cass County)
- Gobles Public Schools (also extends into Allegan County)
- Hartford Public Schools
- Lawrence Public Schools
- Lawton Community Schools (also extends into Kalamazoo County)
- Mattawan Consolidated School (also extends into Kalamazoo County)
- Paw Paw Public School District
- South Haven Public Schools (also extends into Allegan County)

== Washtenaw Intermediate School District ==
=== Washtenaw County ===
- Ann Arbor Public Schools
- Chelsea School District (also extends into Jackson County)
- Dexter Community School District (also extends into Livingston County)
- Lincoln Consolidated School District (also extends into Wayne County)
- Manchester Community Schools (also extends into Jackson County)
- Milan Area Schools (also extends into Monroe County)
- Saline Area Schools
- Whitmore Lake Public School District (also extends into Livingston County)
- Ypsilanti Community Schools

== Wayne County Regional Educational Service Agency ==
=== Wayne County ===
- Allen Park Public Schools
- Crestwood School District
- Dearborn City School District
- Dearborn Heights School District 7
- Detroit City School District
- Detroit Public Schools Community District
- Ecorse Public Schools
- Flat Rock Community Schools (also extends into Monroe County)
- Garden City Public Schools
- Gibraltar School District
- Grosse Ile Township Schools
- Grosse Pointe Public Schools
- School District of the City of Hamtramck
- The School District of the City of Harper Woods
- Highland Park City Schools
- Huron School District (also extends into Monroe County)
- School District of the City of Lincoln Park
- Livonia Public Schools School District
- Melvindale-North Allen Park Schools
- Northville Public Schools (also extends into Oakland and Washtenaw Counties)
- Plymouth-Canton Community Schools (also extends into Washtenaw County)
- Redford Union Schools, District No. 1
- School District of the City of River Rouge
- Riverview Community School District
- Romulus Community Schools
- South Redford School District
- Southgate Community School District
- Taylor School District
- Trenton Public Schools
- Van Buren Public Schools (also extends into Washtenaw County)
- Wayne-Westland Community School District
- Westwood Community School District
- Woodhaven-Brownstown School District
- School District of the City of Wyandotte

== West Shore Educational Service District ==
=== Lake County ===
- Baldwin Community Schools (also extends into Newaygo County)

=== Mason County ===
- Ludington Area Schools
- Mason County Central Schools (also extends into Lake and Oceana Counties)
- Mason County Eastern Schools (also extends into Lake and Manistee Counties)

=== Oceana County ===
- Hart Public School District
- Pentwater Public School District (also extends into Mason County)
- Shelby Public Schools
- Walkerville Public Schools (also extends into Mason and Newaygo Counties

== Wexford–Missaukee Intermediate School District ==
=== Missaukee County ===
- Lake City Area Schools
- McBain Rural Agricultural Schools (also extends into Clare, Osceola and Wexford Counties)

=== Osceola County ===
- Marion Public Schools (also extends into Clare County)
- Pine River Area Schools (also extends into Lake and Wexford Counties)

=== Wexford County ===
- Cadillac Area Public Schools (also extends into Lake and Osceola Counties)
- Manton Consolidated Schools (also extends into Missaukee and Grand Traverse Counties)
- Mesick Consolidated Schools (also extends into Manistee County)
