= Martin High School =

Martin High School can refer to:

== Canada ==
- Martin Collegiate, Regina, Saskatchewan

== United Kingdom ==
- The Martin High School, Anstey, Leicestershire, England

== United States ==
- Martin High School (Martin, Michigan)
- James Martin High School (Arlington, Texas)
- Martin High School (Laredo, Texas)
- Brother Martin High School, New Orleans, Louisiana
- St. Martin High School, St. Martin, Mississippi
- Martin High School, which later became Altheimer-Sherrill High School, Altheimer, Arkansas
- Martin High School, which later became Westview High School, Martin, Tennessee

== See also ==
- Martin County High School, Stuart, Florida
