= Pontiac Academy for Excellence =

Coordinates: 42.64466°N 83.29847°W

Student assessments
- 2021–22 school year

M-STEP 11th grade proficiency rates (Science / Social Studies)
- Advanced %: ≤10 / ≤10
- Proficient %: ≤10 / ≤10
- PR. Proficient %: <3 / –
- Not Proficient %: – / –

Average test scores
- SAT Total: 795.0

Pontiac Academy for Excellence (PAE) is a K-12 public charter school located in Pontiac, Michigan. Pontiac Academy for Excellence was established in 2000. The school is located at 196 Cesar E. Chavez Ave., Pontiac, Michigan 48343.
