= The Greenspire High School =

Greenspire High School

Location
- 2200 Dendrinos Dr; Traverse City, Michigan 49684; United States; 44°44′22″N 85°37′08″W

Information
- Other names: "Greenspire"
- School type: Public secondary
- Established: 2021; 5 years ago September 7, 2021 (building opened)
- School district: Greenspire Schools
- Superintendent: Michael Schramm
- President: Yvette Babin-Ringsmuth
- Teaching staff: 10.00 (on an FTE basis)
- Secondary years taught: 9th, 10th, 11th, 12th, 13th*
- Enrollment: 176 (2024–25)
  - Grade 9: 50
  - Grade 10: 48
  - Grade 11: 42
  - Grade 12: 36
- Student to teacher ratio: 17.60
- Education system: Project-Based Learning
- Sports: No
- Feeder schools: Middle school: The Greenspire Middle School
- Information: \*13th year is available for students dual enrolling at NMC
- Website: greenspireschool.org/high-school/

The Greenspire High School (aka. "Greenspire") is a public charter, co-educational, project-based learning, secondary school, located in Grand Traverse County, Michigan, in the Garfield Township, outside the city limits of Traverse City. Greenspire is one of the two schools in the Greenspire Schools: The Greenspire School (Middle School); and The Greenspire School. The school enrolls about 250 students each year. The school started in 2021.

Greenspire has offered grades 9 through 12. Students are offered a wide variety of classes, some of which are held outside, enrollment at Career Tech Center (aka. CTC), and the option to dual enroll and attend classes at Northwestern Michigan College.

== Academics ==
Greenspire offers 65 classes to its students. In addition, students are given the option to dual-enroll with Northwestern Michigan College. Students can also attend the Career-Tech Center of Northwest Educational Services school district (formerly TBAISD), which offers college or career education for juniors and seniors at Greenspire, as well as those of other districts under TBAISD.

== History ==
In 2020, the Michigan Department of Education approved a grant from the Quality Charter Schools Programs grant, awarding The Greenspire School $650,000 to fund a high school program, proceeding the Greenspire (Middle) School.

In 2026 the Grand Traverse Band of Ottawa and Chippewa Indians (GTB) acquired the current location of Greenspire High School, the Boardman Lake Campus (formerly NMC's), from Northwestern Michigan College (NMC) for $27 Million . Greenspire's usage of the space will run until 2030 on a lease and can extend onto 2035. Greenspire's board has discussed moving the school to another location after the lease ends, although the board has not made any discussion to finalize any relocation(s), but have had discussions on possible locations.

=== Principals ===
Greenspire has had 2 lead principals since its opening in 2021.

Tenure	Principal
2021-2026 (1st Semester)	Erica Walsh

In 2026 (2nd Semester) Greenspire had no lead principal, although Emily Feaster was dean/head of The Greenspire High School

== Demographics ==
The demographic breakdown of Greenspire's 176 students enrolled in 2024–25 was:

- Male – 50.6%
- Female – 49.4%
- American Indian/Alaska Native – 1.7%
- Asian – 0.6%
- Black – 0%
- Hispanic – 4.5%
- Native Hawaiian/Pacific Islander – 1.1%
- White – 85.8%
- Multiracial – 6.3%
- 9th Grade – 28.4%
- 10th Grade – 27.3%
- 11th Grade – 23.9%
- 12th Grade – 20.5%

Additionally, 70 students (39.7%) were eligible for reduced-price or free lunch.
