= West Side Academy (Detroit) =

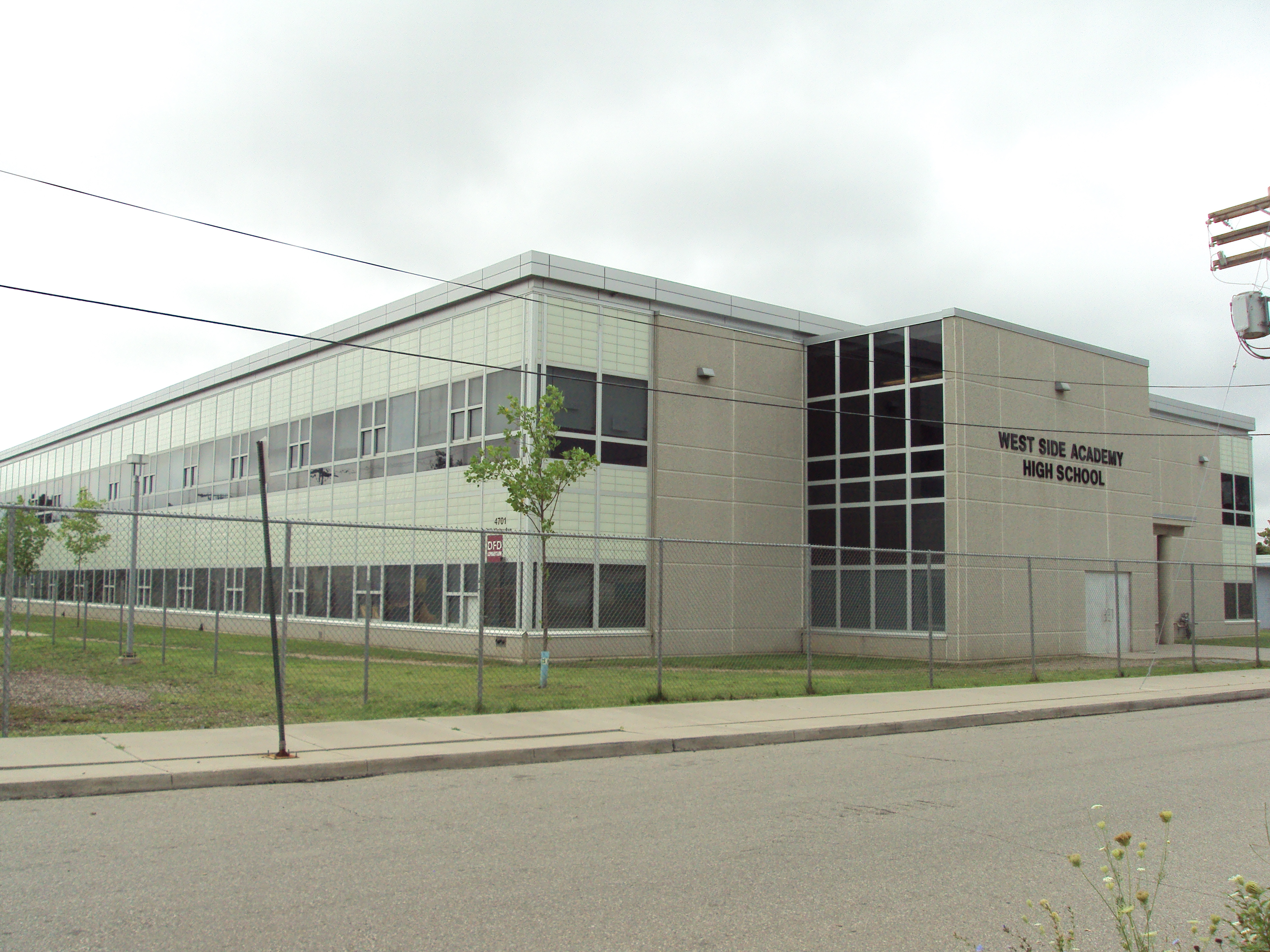

Location
- 4701 McKinley Street; Detroit, Michigan
- Coordinates: 42°20′33″N 83°06′11″W

Information
- Type: Alternative education
- School district: Detroit Public Schools
- Grades: 9–12
- Website: West Side Academy

West Side Academy of Information Technology and Cyber Security is a Detroit alternative public school located on the Detroit's Westside. the school has formerly been named "West Side Academy for Leadership Development, IT and Media Design", and "West Side Academy Alternative Education High School".

== History of alternative education ==
Alternative education has a long and complex history. Events across the country and around the world converged to produce the educational choice and parental liberty enjoyed by many Americans. The school is for young adults struggling to maintain in a regular high school.

== School's background ==
In 2018, West Side Academy reported an enrollment of 490 and an 80% graduation rate. The school's principal is Andrea Ford-Aylor. The school ranges from grades 9–12 and offers up to 40 additional credit hours which allows students to obtain a better chance at graduating on time or even before their graduation year.
