= Landmark Academy =

Charter school in Michigan, United States

Location
- Kimball, Michigan; 42.9837°N 82.516°W

Information
- School type: Charter
- Established: 1999
- Charter: Saginaw Valley State University
- Colors: Royal blue, white and black
- Slogan: Education Redefined
- Nickname: Lakers
- Website: www.landmarkacademy.net

Landmark Academy is a charter school (K-12th grade) located in Kimball in southeastern Michigan. The school is chartered by Saginaw Valley State University. The campus consists of two buildings.

In 2010, Landmark completed the purchase of the adjacent Cross Current building. The upper floor has been remodeled as of August 2006 into a more classroom-like setting for use as the school's middle/high school building. As of June 2010, the lower floor is also being remodeled for use as classrooms. Beginning in the 2010 school year, the lower floor will be designated as middle school, while the upper floor will be used as a high school.
