= Northview High School (Michigan) =

High school in Michigan, United States

Location
- 4451 Hunsberger Ave NE; Grand Rapids, Michigan 49525; United States; 43°02′40″N 85°37′16″W

Information
- Type: Public
- Motto: Preparing students for life's next step.
- Established: 1960
- School district: Northview Public Schools
- Principal: Brent Dickerson
- Teaching staff: 54.23 (FTE)
- Grades: 9-12
- Enrollment: 1,060 (2023–2024)
- Student to teacher ratio: 19.55
- Colors: Red and white
- Nickname: Wildcats
- Website: Northview High School

Student assessments
- 2021–22 school year Change vs. prior year

M-STEP 11th grade proficiency rates (Science / Social Studies)
- Advanced %: 25.4 / 9.0
- Proficient %: 34.0 / 34.8
- PR. Proficient %: 14.3 / 47.1
- Not Proficient %: 26.2 / 9.0

Average test scores
- SAT Total: 981.3 (▼ −7.8)

Northview High School is located in Plainfield Township, Kent County, Michigan, a Northeastern suburb of Grand Rapids, Michigan. It was a National Blue Ribbon school in 2001. The high school is one of the two high schools in the Northview Public Schools system.

== History ==
The Northview Public School District was born in the late 1950s. As the population of greater Grand Rapids swelled, the need for a high school became clear, and in an effort to pool the financial resources needed to build a high school, several small rural school districts merged with the Oakview Public School District to form Northview Public Schools. In 1959, construction began on the building, and in 1962, Northview High School opened its doors to its first students. In 2011 and 2012, two tax proposals gave over 43.5 million dollars towards renovating the high school campus, as well as the athletic facilities. In the early fall of 2014, the construction was completed.

== Athletics ==
The Northview Wildcats are in the Ottawa-Kent Conference White Division. Northview's athletic teams compete under the "Wildcat" mascot.

== Notable alumni ==
- Gary Hogeboom - NFL Quarterback
- Stacy Haiduk - actor
