= Parkway Christian School =

Private school in Sterling Heights, Michigan

Location
- 14500 Metro Parkway; Sterling Heights, Michigan, (Macomb County) 48312
- 42°33′56.2″N 82°59′02.5″W

Information
- Former names: Bethesda Christian School, Zoe Christian Academy
- Motto: Challenging Minds, Capturing Hearts, Cultivating Gifts
- Religious affiliation: Christian
- Established: c. 2006
- Locale: Large suburb
- Educational authority: Christian Schools International
- NCES School ID: A9103422
- Head of school: Lila Place
- Teaching staff: 43
- Grades: K-12
- Gender: Coed
- Enrollment: 508 (2019-2020)
  - Pre-kindergarten: 55
  - Kindergarten: 28
  - Grade 1: 49
  - Grade 2: 35
  - Grade 3: 22
  - Grade 4: 34
  - Grade 5: 26
  - Grade 6: 31
  - Grade 7: 35
  - Grade 8: 27
  - Grade 9: 33
  - Grade 10: 30
  - Grade 11: 53
  - Grade 12: 50
- Student to teacher ratio: 10.5:1
- Colors: Blue and red
- Mascot: Eagles

Parkway Christian School is a private K-12 Christian school located in Sterling Heights, Michigan in the Metro Detroit area.

The school formed in 2006, with the merger of Bethesda Christian School and Zoe Christian Academy.

== Student demographics ==
As of the 2019–2020 school year the total enrollment was 508, with 55 of those being pre-k students.

Race/ethnicity	Enrollment	Percent of student population
White (non-Hispanic)	278	61.4%
Black	87	19.2%
American Indian/ Alaska Native	40	8.8%
Asian	34	7.5%
Hispanic	13	2.9%
Native Hawaiian/ Pacific Islander	1	0.2%

== Tuition and fees ==
As with most private schools, tuition at Parkway Christian varies based on the number of children a family has enrolled and their grade level, with the highest tuition for a single child during the 2022–2023 school year being $8,925 without fees, and the lowest being $3,675.

	Kindergarten (half day)	Kindergarten (full day)	Grades 1-4	Grades 5-8	Grades 9-12
1st child	$3,675	$5,725	$5,940	$7,235	$8,925
2nd child	$3,620	$5,510	$5,615	$6,915	$8,295
3rd child	$3,405	$4,860	$5,075	$6,155	$7,245

Additional fees may also be charged, including fees for: family enrollment, testing, Latchkey services, and athletic participation, among others.

== Athletics ==
As a member of the Michigan High School Athletic Association (MHSAA), Parkway Christian competes with both public and private schools in the Metro Detroit area. The school is also a member of the Michigan Independent Athletic Conference (MIAC), which comprises fourteen schools divided into two divisions.

A wide variety of sports are offered to students through the school year in both Middle School and Varsity teams.

	Fall sports	Winter sports	Spring sports
Boys	Football, soccer	Basketball	Baseball, golf
Girls	Cheer, golf, soccer (middle school only), volleyball	Basketball, cheer	Soccer, softball
Coed	Cross country	Volleyball (4th-5th grade only)	Track & field

The school won the Class D Baseball State Championship in 2016 after beating the St. Patrick Catholic School Shamrocks 10–3. They had faced elimination during the regional round the year prior, losing 0–1 against Novi Franklin Road Christian.
