= Howardsville Christian School =

Location
- 53441 Bent Road; Marcellus, Michigan 49067; United States; 42.0174°N 85.8158°W

Information
- Type: Private Christian school
- Motto: "Teaching a Love for the Lord and a Love for Learning"
- Established: 1980
- Staff: 14.6 (FTE)
- Grades: PK–12
- Enrollment: 215
- Student to teacher ratio: 12.8:1
- Athletics: MHSAA Division 4
- Mascot: Eagles
- Website: www.hcseagles.com

Howardsville Christian School is a private Christian school in Marcellus, Michigan. The school was founded in 1980 and serves students from pre-kindergarten through grade 12. It is affiliated with Howardsville Gospel Chapel.

== History ==
The school was established in 1980 by Howardsville Gospel Chapel on a 55-acre campus.

== Academics ==
Howardsville Christian School enrolls 215 students with a student-teacher ratio of 12.8:1. The school operates 174 days per year and is affiliated with the Association of Christian Schools International.

== Athletics ==
The school competes in Michigan High School Athletic Association Division 4 athletics as the Eagles. The boys' basketball team has won six district titles and reached the MHSAA quarterfinals in 2018. Former student Dylan Jergens scored 2,782 career points, ranking third in MHSAA history.
