= Detroit Leadership Academy =

Charter school in Detroit, Michigan

Coordinates: 42°19′52.8″N 83°13′58.9″W

Detroit Leadership Academy is a free public charter school located in Detroit, Michigan. The school was opened in 2012 through the YMCA and currently serves students in Pre-K - 11th grade at two campuses on the city's west side and is managed by Equity Education.

The school is one of 70 schools authorized and supported by Central Michigan University
