= Gobles Public Schools =

School district in Michigan

Address
- 409 North State Street Gobles, Van Buren County, Michigan, 49055; United States

District information
- Grades: PreKindergarten–12
- Superintendent: James Wiseley
- Schools: 3
- Budget: $12,236,000 2022-2023 expenditures
- NCES District ID: 2616050

Students and staff
- Students: 786 (2024-2025)
- Teachers: 53.6 (on an FTE basis) (2024-2025)
- Staff: 102.3 FTE (2024-2025)
- Student–teacher ratio: 14.66 (2024-2025)
- District mascot: Tigers

Other information
- Website: www.gobles.org

Gobles Public Schools is a public school district in West Michigan. In Van Buren County, it serves Gobles and parts of the townships of Almena, Bloomingdale, Pine Grove, and Waverly. It also serves a small part of Trowbridge Township in Allegan County.

== History ==
A wooden building housed Gobles High School when its first class graduated in 1894. A new two-story brick school was built in 1909. In 1953, the state fire marshal told the school board that the building needed repairs, and they chose to build additions at the district's newer school, currently the middle/high school, and close the 1909 building. The expanded school, which included all grades, opened in fall 1954. By 1955, enrollment was growing quickly and stood at 571 students, and a one-room schoolhouse had to be employed for the overflow.

Gobles Elementary was dedicated on December 17, 1961, the same month that it opened to students. Guido A. Binda of Battle Creek was the architect. During that school year, the district had 787 students.

Additions were completed in January 1968 at both schools in the district. That year, enrollment was at 995 students.

The junior/senior high school was overcrowded by 1977, and the nine portable classrooms in use were inadequate and expensive to heat. A bond issue to build a new high school failed that spring, and another failed in 1978.

Meanwhile, the rivalrous pranks and vandalism between Gobles High School and Bloomingdale High School students reached a crisis on September 27, 1978, when some Gobles students drove to Bloomingdale High and struck principal Paul Storm with their car. Storm was in critical condition for several days, although the students were not charged, and Storm recovered. Both districts held assemblies to try to cool the situation. A varsity football game between the schools was cancelled.

Between 2002 and 2023, $45.47 million in construction bonds were approved. The 2023 bond funded reconstruction of part of the middle/high school and renovations at both of the district's school buildings.

== Schools ==
Schools in Gobles Public Schools district share a campus at 409 North State Street in Gobles.

Schools in Gobles Public Schools district
School	Notes
Gobles Middle/High School	Grades 6-12
Gobles Elementary	Grades PreK-6
Gobles Virtual Academy	Online school for grades K-12
