= Utica Alternative Learning Center =

Location
- 7600 18 Mile Rd; Sterling Heights, Macomb County, Michigan 48314
- Coordinates: 42°35′40″N 83°02′01″W

Information
- School type: Alternative
- Motto: Empower, Achieve, Succeed
- Locale: Large suburb
- School district: Utica Community Schools
- NCES District ID: 2634470
- NCES School ID: 263447008727
- Administrator: Mark McLoughlin
- Staff: 18
- Teaching staff: 9
- Grades: 9th–12th
- Enrollment: 258 (2023-2024)
- Website: https://alc.uticak12.org/

The UCS Alternative Learning Center, or ALC, is an alternative school located in Sterling Heights, Michigan. The school serves students in grades 9–12 who are unable to attend a traditional high school in the school district. The center also operates as the district's summer school location.

District students can either graduate directly from the ALC, or can use the center as a means of improving attendance or Michigan Educational Assessment Program (MEAP) scores, or to regain lost credits to graduate from one of the traditional high schools.

The ALC is a Title I school under the Elementary and Secondary Education Act.

== Demographics ==
During the 2020-2021 school year, the ALC had a total enrollment of 148 students. Approximately 72% of the students were male, and 28% were female. Over 75% of the enrolled students were eligible to receive free or reduced-price lunch under the National School Lunch Act of 1946.
