= Eaton Rapids Public Schools =

School district in Michigan

Address
- 912 Greyhound Drive Eaton Rapids, Eaton County, Michigan, 48827; United States

District information
- Grades: Pre-Kindergarten-12
- Superintendent: Kevin Dufresne
- Schools: 6
- Budget: $43,784,000 2022-2023 total expenditures
- NCES District ID: 2612690

Students and staff
- Students: 1,928 (2024-2025)
- Teachers: 123.32 (on an FTE basis) (2024-2025)
- Staff: 292.59 FTE (2024-2025)
- Student–teacher ratio: 15.63 (2024-2025)

Other information
- Website: www.erpsk12.org

Eaton Rapids Public Schools is a public school district in the Lansing, Michigan, area. In Eaton County, it serves Eaton Rapids and parts of the townships of Brookfield, Eaton, Eaton Rapids, Hamlin, and Windsor. In Ingham County, it serves parts of the townships of Aurelius, Delhi, and Onondaga.

== History ==
The first commencement at Eaton Rapids High School was in 1875.

A brick school was built in 1886 on the north side of King Street near the end of West Street. It was ultimately known as the West Building. An elementary school was built to the east of it, and the high school was built to the north of the elementary on the west side of Hall Street in 1923.

The West Building was condemned by the state fire marshal in 1939, but the high school continued to hold classes in it due to overcrowding. It was torn down when the new high school opened. As of 1962, high school classes were held in three other buildings, including the 1923 high school, which was converted to a junior high when the current high school opened.

Northwestern Elementary was built in 1959 and closed in 2011.

Union Street Elementary was built in 1962. The architect was Guido A. Binda. Currently it is known as Union Street Center and houses the Early Learning Center and other programs for the community.

The current high school opened in fall 1963. Warren Holmes Co. was the architect.

The opening of the high school was marred by vandalism. A few days prior to the first football game of the year, a match with Charlotte High School, students from Charlotte spray painted "CHS" on the school and smashed school bus windows. The guilty boys agreed to pay for the clean-up and did not face prosecution. Eaton Rapids won the football game against Charlotte 21-6.

The middle school and intermediate school share a building that opened in 1971. The name "Intermediate" was chosen instead of "Junior High" because, as then superintendent Carl Holbrook said, "The word 'junior' gives connotations of secondary importance. We don't want our new school to be junior anything."

Parts of the former high school have been converted into apartments.

== Schools ==
The district's schools share a campus on State Street/Plains Road at Greyhound Drive.

Schools in Eaton Rapids Public Schools district
School	Address	Notes
Eaton Rapids High School	800 State Street, Eaton Rapids	Grades 9-12; built 1963
Eaton Rapids Middle School	815 Greyhound Drive, Eaton Rapids	Grades 6-8
Greyhound Intermediate School	805 Greyhound Drive, Eaton Rapids	Grades 3-5
Lockwood Elementary	810 Greyhound Drive, Eaton Rapids	Grades K-2; includes a Montessori school for grades K-3
Greyhound Central Elementary	912 Greyhound Drive, Eaton Rapids	Grades PreK-K
Greyhound Early Learning Center	501 Union Street, Eaton Rapids	Preschool and daycare housed in Union Street Center
Greyhound Central Performance Academy		Alternative high school
Eaton Rapids Virtual Scholar Program		Online school for grades 6-12

== Notable people ==
- Don McNabb, cofounder of TriTerra, an environmental consultant company located in Central Michigan
- Colin Parks, an employee for the Michigan Department of Health and Human Services
- Andrea Bitely, a chief communications officer for Mike Duggan
