= Vestaburg Community Schools =

School district in Michigan

Address
- 7188 Avenue B Vestaburg, Montcalm County, Michigan, 48891; United States

District information
- Grades: PreKindergarten–12
- Superintendent: Brandon Hubbard
- Schools: 3
- Budget: $13,414,000 2022-2023 expenditures
- NCES District ID: 2634920

Students and staff
- Students: 841 (2024-2025)
- Teachers: 45.55 (on an FTE basis) (2024-2025)
- Staff: 116.6 FTE (2024-2025)
- Student–teacher ratio: 18.46 (2024-2025)
- District mascot: Wolverines

Other information
- Website: www.vcs-k12.net

Vestaburg Community Schools (also known as Vestaburg Community School) is a public school district in Central Michigan. In Montcalm County, it serves parts of the townships of Day, Ferris, and Richland. In Isabella County, it serves part of Fremont Township.

== History ==
Prior to the opening of the current schools, Vestaburg's school was a stone and brick building with a wooden cupola. On May 6, 1961, the current Vestaburg Community High School was dedicated. The Warren Holmes Company of Lansing was the architect. By 1967, an adjacent school was built to serve the lower grades. This contributed to praise that year from the University of Michigan's Bureau of School Services, which also applauded the district's improvements to testing, curriculum, and vocational programs.

In 2009, voters approved a $9.18 million bond issue to expand and renovate the schools.

== Schools ==
Schools in Vestaburg Community Schools district share a campus and address at 7188 Avenue B in Vestaburg.

Schools in Vestaburg Community Schools district
School	Notes
Vestaburg Middle/High School	Grades 6–12.
Vestaburg Elementary	Grades PreK-5.
Vestaburg Community Alternative Education School	Alternative high school. Grades 9-12.
