= Gwinn Area Community Schools =

School district in Michigan

Address
- 50 West M-35 Gwinn, Marquette County, Michigan, 49841; United States

District information
- Grades: PreKindergarten–12
- Superintendent: Sara Croney
- Schools: 3
- Budget: $16,152,000 2022-2023 expenditures
- NCES District ID: 2614690

Students and staff
- Students: 907 (2024-2025)
- Teachers: 66 (on an FTE basis) (2024-2025)
- Staff: 161.7 FTE (2024-2025)
- Student–teacher ratio: 13.74 (2024-2025)
- District mascot: Modeltowners

Other information
- Website: www.gwinnschools.org

Gwinn Area Community Schools is a public school district in Marquette County, in the Upper Peninsula of Michigan. It serves Gwinn, K. I. Sawyer Air Force Base, the townships of Forsyth, Skandia, and West Branch, and parts of the townships of Marquette and Sands.

== History ==
William Gwinn Mather, president of the mining company that founded the town, designed Gwinn as a planned community around 1906. Maher's intentions for an idyllic town earned it the nickname the "Model Town," and "Modeltowners" became the name of Gwinn Schools' sports teams. The first class (consisting of one student named Jane Pepin) graduated from Gwinn High School in 1909. A new school was built that same year and expanded in 1915.

The current Gwinn High School opened in fall 1963. With K. I. Sawyer Air Force Base a major presence in the town, construction was funded by the United States Office of Education. Gwinn Middle School opened in November 1967 on the site of the old Gwinn School.

The air force base, which had contributed to district enrollment through service members’ children, closed in 1995.

== Schools ==
Schools in Gwinn Area Community Schools district
School	Address	Notes
Gwinn Middle/High School	50 W M-35, Gwinn	Grades 6–12. Built 1963.
George D. Gilbert Elementary	250 W Iron St., Gwinn	Grades 3–5.
K. I. Sawyer Elementary	411 Scorpion, Gwinn	Grades PreK-2.
