= Manistique Area Schools =

School district in Michigan

Address
- 100 North Cedar Street Manistique, Schoolcraft County, Michigan, 49854; United States

District information
- Grades: PreKindergarten–12
- Superintendent: Matthew Lukshaitis
- Schools: 3
- Budget: $11,774,000 2022-2023 expenditures
- NCES District ID: 2622470

Students and staff
- Students: 701 (2024-2025)
- Teachers: 45.45 (on an FTE basis) (2024-2025)
- Staff: 97.72 FTE (2024-2025)
- Student–teacher ratio: 15.42 (2024-2025)
- District mascot: Emeralds

Other information
- Website: manistiqueschools.org

Manistique Area Schools is a public school district in the Upper Peninsula of Michigan. It serves the town of Manistique and all of Schoolcraft County, except for part of Hiawatha Township and the townships of Inwood and Seney.

The district operates the town's public library, known as Manistique School & Public Library. It is located in the middle/high school building at 100 North Cedar Street.

== History ==
Triangle Park was the location of the first school in Manistique, a red-painted wooden structure built by the Chicago Lumbering Company around 1872. It became badly overcrowded, but a new school was not built until 1882. This was Central School, built on the site of the current middle/high School. Ten years later, the high school was founded within Central School, and the first class graduated in 1893. Between 1890 and 1910, Westside, Lakeside, and Riverside schools were built.

A new Manistique High School opened in 1918 near Central School. In an account published in the Escanaba Daily Press, teacher Stanley B. Carlyon described the transition from the old school to the new one. "The old school on Main Street began to look bare and drab compared to the new building with all its new equipment. The old building had hand-stoked furnaces of ancient vintage and restrooms in the damp and gloomy basements. The new building was bright and clean from top to bottom."

A Junior High opened in 1931, replacing Central School, which was then closed. The current middle/high school, designed by architecture firm Daverman Associates, opened in fall 1976 and was dedicated on September 26, 1976. The 1918 school was demolished by the summer of 1977.

Construction of Emerald Elementary was funded by a 2005 bond issue.

== Schools ==
Schools in Manistique Public Schools district
School	Address	Notes
Manistique Middle/High School	100 North Cedar Street, Manistique	Grades 6–12. Built 1976.
Emerald Elementary	628 Oak Street, Manistique	Grades PreK-5
Jack Regue Alternative High School	1185 North M-94, Manistique	Alternative high school
