= South Haven Public Schools =

School district in Michigan

Address
- 554 Green Street South Haven, Van Buren County, Michigan, 49090; United States

District information
- Grades: Pre-Kindergarten-12
- Superintendent: Ana Aleman-Putman
- Schools: 6
- Budget: $37,114,000 2022-2023 expenditures
- NCES District ID: 2632300

Students and staff
- Students: 1,815 (2024-2025)
- Teachers: 129.23 (on an FTE basis) (2024-2025)
- Staff: 280.58 FTE (2024-2025)
- Student–teacher ratio: 14.04 (2024-2025)

Other information
- Website: www.shps.org

South Haven Public Schools is a public school district in southwest Michigan. In Van Buren County, it serves South Haven and parts of the townships of Geneva and South Haven. In Allegan County it serves part of Casco Township.

== History ==
The first school in South Haven was established in 1852 at the corner of Indiana Avenue and Superior Street. Near the intersection of School Street and Erie Street, a frame school building was built in 1858. It was expanded and improved upon several times over the next fifty years, receiving a brick veneer in 1897.

Some of South Haven's early schools included Indiana Elementary from 1898, Hartman Elementary from 1906, and the former South Haven High School from 1913. It was built east of the 1858 high school, facing Broadway.

The 1913 high school was expanded west along Erie Street in 1925 with a section called the Central Building. The addition was dedicated in fall 1926. The Vocational Building, facing Superior Street, was added to the high school campus in 1936. Lincoln Elementary was built in 1954.

Replacing the 1913 high school, L.C. Mohr High School opened in fall 1961, named after the district superintendent who had served for thirty years. The high school is also simply known as South Haven High School and continues to serve as such. The architect was Guido Binda of Battle Creek. The former high school became a junior high and later, an elementary school.

Baseline Middle School opened in January 1993. The new building featured technology such as a centralized video system and industrial robots for career education. Grades six, seven and eight each had a classroom wing identified by green, blue, or burgundy carpets.

In 1999, the historic Central, Hartman, Indiana buildings were still in use, with a section of Central condemned due to air quality concerns. Repeated bond issue votes to fund construction failed until 2003. The new school, North Shore Elementary, opened in fall 2005 and replaced those three schools. Listiak Auditorium, with 570 seats, opened at the high school in May 2006. A South Haven graduate converted Indiana Elementary into two condos. Hartman School, at 355 Hubbard Street, was repurposed as the Historical Association of South Haven. Central Elementary was redeveloped into residential units beginning in 2007.

== Schools ==
Schools in South Haven Public Schools district
School	Address	Notes
South Haven High School	600 Elkenburg, South Haven	Grades 9–12. Built 1961.
Baseline Middle School	7357 Baseline Road, South Haven	Grades 6–8. Built 1993.
Lincoln Elementary	500 Elkenburg Street, South Haven	Grades PreK-3
Maple Grove Elementary	72399 12th Avenue, South Haven	Grades PreK-3
North Shore Elementary	7320 North Shore Dr., South Haven	Grades 4–5. Built 2005.
S.H.A.C.	125 Veterans Blvd., South Haven	South Haven Alliance Campus. Alternative high school within the South Haven campus of Lake Michigan College.
