= New Lothrop Area Public Schools =

School district in Michigan

New Lothrop Area Schools

Address
- 9285 Easton Road New Lothrop, Shiawassee County, Michigan, 48460; United States

District information
- Grades: PreKindergarten–12
- Superintendent: Jay Larner
- Schools: 2
- Budget: $13,443,000 2022-2023 expenditures
- NCES District ID: 2625290

Students and staff
- Students: 903 (2024-2025)
- Teachers: 52.2 (on an FTE basis) (2024-2025)
- Staff: 98.64 FTE (2024-2025)
- Student–teacher ratio: 17.3 (2024-2025)

Other information
- Website: www.newlothrop.k12.mi.us

New Lothrop Area Public Schools is a public school district in Central Michigan. In Shiawasee County, it serves New Lothrop, and parts of Hazelton Township. In Saginaw County, it serves parts of the townships of Chesaning and Maple Grove.

== History ==
New Lothrop had a high school by at least 1904, when it was mentioned in a local newspaper that four students graduated. As of 1930, 56 students attended the high school.

The school caught fire on March 22, 1932, and could not be reached by the fire department due to heavy snow on the roads. A new school replaced it, opening in January 1933. A gymnasium/auditorium addition was approved in 1936, mostly paid for by the Works Progress Administration. In 1969, plans were drawn to build a new high school.

In 2005, voters passed a bond issue to fund the construction of New Lothrop Elementary.

== Schools ==
The two buildings in the district, the high school and the elementary, share a campus at 9387 Genesee Street in New Lothrop.

Schools in New Lothrop Area Public Schools district
School	Notes
New Lothrop High School	Grades 7–12.
New Lothrop Elementary	Grades PreK-6.
