= Rudyard Area Schools =

School district in Michigan, United States

Address
- 1185 W. 2nd Street Rudyard, Chippewa County, Michigan, 49780; United States

District information
- Motto: Every student. Every day. Whatever it takes.
- Grades: PreKindergarten–12
- Superintendent: Tom McKee
- Schools: 1
- Budget: $11,529,000 2022–2023 expenditures
- NCES District ID: 2630360

Students and staff
- Students: 603 (2024–2025)
- Teachers: 44.81 (on an FTE basis) (2024–2025)
- Staff: 84.6 FTE (2024–2025)
- Student–teacher ratio: 13.46 (2024–2025)
- District mascot: Bulldogs

Other information
- Website: rudyard.eupschools.org

Rudyard Area Schools is a public school district in the Upper Peninsula of Michigan. In Chippewa County, it serves the townships of Kinross, Rudyard, Trout Lake, and part of Dafter Township. It also serves parts of Brevort Township in Mackinac County.

Rudyard's school is located at 1185 West Second Street in Rudyard Township. It houses preschool through 12th grade.

== History ==
Rudyard School was established in 1890. The current facility dates to around 1955. A separate elementary school, known as Turner-Howson School, was built in 1965. It closed after the 2012-2013 school year.

The pool opened in January 1973. To offset the small district's operating costs of the pool, which is used by the general community, the Sault Tribe of Chippewa Indians donated $30,000 in 2024.

In 1977, Kincheloe Air Force Base closed. It was a major employer in the area, and over half of the Rudyard Junior/Senior High School's enrollment was immediately lost. As stated in the high school's 1978 yearbook:

Our enrollment dropped from 561 students in grades 9–12 in 1976–77, to 298 students in 1977–78. Last year we had a total of 112 faculty members in Jr. and Sr. High; there were 46 this year. This loss of 329 people included many mere acquaintances—and even more dear, lifetime friends. Rudyard High School 1977–78—a year of separation, loneliness, and sorrow. We had to start afresh—pick up the pieces—and build a new life for ourselves and our school.

The district's enrollment was over 1,200 in 1999, but declined to about 600 in 2025, following a statewide trend due to a lowering birth rate.

In 2024, voters passed a $3.1 million bond issue to add secure vestibules to the school and fund other improvements.
