= Algonac Community School District =

School district in Michigan, United States

Address
- 5200 Taft Road Clay Township, St. Clair County, Michigan, 48001; United States

District information
- Grades: Pre-Kindergarten-12
- Superintendent: Alan Latosz
- Schools: 4
- Budget: $22,866,000 2022-2023 expenditures
- NCES District ID: 2602190

Students and staff
- Students: 1,299 (2024-2025)
- Teachers: 75.51 (on an FTE basis) (2024-2025)
- Staff: 199.13 FTE (2024-2025)
- Student–teacher ratio: 17.2 (2024-2025)

Other information
- Website: www.acsk12.us

Algonac Community School District is a public school district in St. Clair County, Michigan. It serves Algonac, Pearl Beach, Clay Township and part of Ira Township.

== History ==
A high school was established in Algonac by at least 1894, when it was mentioned in a local newspaper that twenty students graduated that year. A new school, which originally included all grades in the district, opened around November 1924.

Three elementary schools were built in 1954: Algonac Elementary next to the 1924 high school building, Fair Haven, and Pointe Tremble (on the campus of the current high school). Fair Haven Elementary was used as a shelter when a flooding disaster struck the community in March 1955.

Algonac Junior/Senior High School opened in fall 1964. Charles M. Valentine of Marysville was the architect. The core spaces of the building such as the gymnasium were designed for a total enrollment of 1,500. A unique feature of the building was its sewage treatment plant, approved by local and state permitting agencies, that treated and discharged sewage to the St. Clair River.

The 1924 school building became Roy T. Gilbert Algonac Junior High School upon the current high school's opening, named after a long-serving school board member.

Algonquin Junior High (now Algonquin Elementary) opened in 1979. The architect was Roy French of Port Huron. The building includes a 500-seat auditorium. Millside Elementary was dedicated on October 3, 1993, and a time capsule was buried there.

In 1998, the district's removal of a mural sparked a debate about students' free expression and received media coverage. With the approval of the art teacher, several murals had been painted in the corridors of Algonac High School by students. One mural, which took months to complete, depicted the comic book character Lady Death. It was finished in the spring of 1997 in a prominent school corridor. A parent complained in March 1998 that the mural was offensive and school leadership had it painted over, leading to an outcry of censorship and changes to the district's policy on student displays of art.

Harsens Island Elementary was a two-room school with 26 students in grades K-5 as of 2004. It closed in summer 2005. Pointe Tremble Elementary closed in summer 2009, but the building continued to be used by other district programs.

Algonac Elementary closed in 2015, along with Fair Haven Elementary. The closure was part of a district restructuring that also converted Algonquin Middle School to Algonquin Elementary and moved middle school students to the high school campus.

Upon its closure in 2015, the courtyard of Algonac Elementary held the largest black oak tree in the United States. In July of that year, a branch four feet thick fell into the building, destroying the roof of a classroom and complicating the district's efforts to sell the building.

== Schools ==
Schools in Algonac Community Schools
School	Address	Notes
Algonac Junior/Senior High School	5200 Taft Rd., Clay Township	Grades 7–12. Built 1964.
Algonquin Elementary	9185 Marsh Rd., Clay Township	Grades 2–6. Built 1979.
Millside Elementary	1904 Mill St., Clay Township	Grades K-1. Built 1993.
Algonac Alternative High School	9541 Phelps Rd., Clay Township	Grades 9–12. Built around 1954. Formerly Pointe Tremble Elementary. Shares a building with Early Childhood Center.
Pointe Tremble Early Childhood Center	9541 Phelps Rd., Clay Township	Preschool
