= Mendon Community Schools =

School district in Michigan, United States

Address
- 148 Kirby Road Mendon, St. Joseph County, Michigan, 49072; United States

District information
- Grades: PreKindergarten–12
- Superintendent: Leasa Griffith-Mathews
- Schools: 2
- Budget: $6,711,000 2022–2023 expenditures
- NCES District ID: 2623520

Students and staff
- Students: 464 (2024–2025)
- Teachers: 35.17 (on an FTE basis) (2024–2025)
- Staff: 63.7 FTE (2024–2025)
- Student–teacher ratio: 13.19 (2024–2025)
- District mascot: Hornets

Other information
- Website: mendonschools.org

Mendon Community Schools is a public school district in West Michigan. In St. Joseph County, it serves Mendon and parts of the townships of Colon, Leonidas, Lockport, Mendon, Nottawa, and Park. In Kalamazoo County, it serves parts of the townships of Brady and Wakeshma.

== History ==
Mendon's first school was established in 1837 in a log cabin, and a permanent school was built in 1841. A larger, two-story school was built in 1860 and expanded in 1865, but it burned in 1872.

After holding school in temporary quarters, a new building was built in 1873. A high school was established in that building in 1874, and the first class graduated four years later. In 1884, a program was established in the high school called the Lyceum, in which rhetoric and public speaking was taught.

A new school was built in 1906 at 300 Clinton Street, and it would serve as the high school until 1976. The high cost of rehabilitation made saving the building impossible, and it was torn down in 2016.

The current middle/high school opened in fall 1976.

== Schools ==
Schools in Mendon Community Schools district
School	Address	Notes
Mendon Middle/High School	148 Kirby Road, Mendon	Grades 6–12
Mendon Elementary	306 Lane Street, Mendon	Grades PreK-5
