= L'Anse Area Schools =

School district in Michigan, United States

Address
- 201 North 4th Street L'Anse, Baraga County, Michigan, 49946; United States

District information
- Grades: Kindergarten–12
- Superintendent: Christopher M. Davidson
- Schools: 1
- Budget: $9,333,000 2022–2023 expenditures
- NCES District ID: 2600018

Students and staff
- Students: 490 (2024–2025)
- Teachers: 36.64 (on an FTE basis) (2024–2025)
- Staff: 77.1 FTE (2024–2025)
- Student–teacher ratio: 13.37 (2024–2025)
- District mascot: Purple Hornets

Other information
- Website: www.lanseschools.org

L'Anse Area Schools is a public school district in the Upper Peninsula of Michigan. In Baraga County, it serves L'Anse and the townships of Covington and L'Anse. In Houhgton County, it serves Laird Township and part of Duncan Township. In Ontonagon County, it serves part of Bohemia Township.

== History ==
The first school in L'Anse was a three-story structure that also served as the courthouse. It was placed in L'Anse in 1858 after being floated across Keweenaw Bay from a copper mine. A dedicated schoolhouse was built in 1872, and a larger school was built in 1881. A new high school was built in 1906.

The first section of the current building was built in 1926 and 1927. An elementary school was added to the campus in 1965, and an industrial arts building in 1974. A large addition connected the schools in 1999.

== Schools ==
L'Anse Area Schools operates a single building at 201 North 4th Street, although the elementary and junior/senior high schools are administratively separate, with different principals. The town's public library is also located in the building.
