= Marcellus Community Schools =

School district in Michigan

Address
- 305 West Arbor Street Marcellus, Cass, Michigan, 49067; United States

District information
- Grades: PreKindergarten–12
- Superintendent: Michael Dunn
- Schools: 4
- Budget: $11,022,000 2022–2023 expenditures
- NCES District ID: 2622740

Students and staff
- Students: 600 (2024–2025)
- Teachers: 31.75 (on an FTE basis) (2024–2025)
- Staff: 89.03 FTE (2024–2025)
- Student–teacher ratio: 18.9 (2024–2025)
- District mascot: Wildcats
- Colors: Orange and black

Other information
- Website: marcelluscs.org

Marcellus Community Schools is a public school district in southwest Michigan. In Cass County, it serves Marcellus, Marcellus Township, and parts of the townships of Newberg, Penn, and Volinia. In St. Joseph County, it serves parts of Flowerfield Township. It also serves parts of Decatur Township and Porter Township in Van Buren County.

== History ==
Marcellus' school district was founded in 1874, and a one-room schoolhouse was built. A four-classroom, two-story school opened in fall 1880. The first class graduated in 1889. In 1891, the district began teaching all twelve grades. The school was wired for electricity in 1915.

A new school building opened in fall 1939, partially funded by the Public Works Administration. The architect was Stewart-Kingscott of Kalamazoo. The Marcellus district consolidated with outlying districts in 1948. A new elementary school opened in 1957. The high school was dedicated in 1968.

== Schools ==
Schools in Marcellus Community Schools district
School	Address	Notes
Marcellus High School	303 West Arbor Street, Marcellus	Grades 9–12
Marcellus Middle School	125 Burney Street, Marcellus	Grades 6-8
Marcellus Elementary	301 West Arbor Street, Marcellus	Grades PreK-5
Volinia Outcomes	54080 Gards Prairie Road, Decatur	Grades 7-12. Alternative school.
