= Kingston Community School District =

School district in Michigan

Address
- 5790 State Street Kingston, Tuscola County, Michigan, 48741; United States

District information
- Grades: PreKindergarten–12
- Schools: 2
- Budget: $10,029,000 2022–2023 expenditures
- NCES District ID: 2620400

Students and staff
- Students: 581 (2024–2025)
- Teachers: 32.12 (on an FTE basis) (2024–2025)
- Staff: 91.38 FTE (2024–2025)
- Student–teacher ratio: 18.09 (2024–2025)
- District mascot: Cardinals

Other information
- Website: www.kingstonk12.org

Kingston Community School District is a public school district in Tuscola County, in The Thumb area of Michigan. It serves Kingston and parts of the townships of Dayton, Kingston, Koylton, and Wells.

== History ==
In a 1966 newspaper article discussing a bond issue to fund a new high school, the school facilities of that time are described. The old high school building was built in 1899, and it received additions in 1931, 1957 and 1963. This school housed all grades under one roof.

The current high school opened on January 7, 1970. The 19th-century high school wing was torn down in 1972.

== Schools ==
Schools in Kingston Community School District
School	Address	Notes
Kingston High School	5790 State Street, Kingston	Grades 7–12
Kingston Elementary	3644 Ross Street, Kingston	Grades PreK-6
