= Houghton Lake Community Schools =

School district in Michigan, United States

Address
- 4433 W. Houghton Lake Drive Houghton Lake, Roscommon County, Michigan, 48629; United States

District information
- Grades: PreKindergarten–12
- Superintendent: Benjamin Williams
- Schools: 3
- Budget: $15,112,000 2021-2022 expenditures
- NCES District ID: 2618600

Students and staff
- Students: 1,076 (2023-2024)
- Teachers: 87.84 (on an FTE basis) (2023-2024)
- Staff: 223.41 FTE (2023-2024)
- Student–teacher ratio: 12.25 (2023-2024)

Other information
- Website: www.hlcsk12.net

Houghton Lake Community Schools is a public school district in Northern Michigan. In Roscommon County, it serves Houghton Lake, Prudenville, and the townships of Backus, Denton, Lake, Markey, Nester, and Roscommon, and part of Richfield Township. In Missaukee County it serves parts of the townships of Aetna, Butterfield, Enterprise, Holland, and West Branch.

== History ==
One of the original Houghton Lake school buildings is the Old Stone School at 7730 Stone School Road. It was built around 1924 and included the district's high school. A new high school (used today as Collins Elementary) was dedicated in May 1950.

The current high school was built in 1977.

In 1984, the district was in danger of closing due to a string of defeated tax millages. That fall, community members and students campaigned for passage of a millage that would allow the district to continue operating. The millage was approved on September 12, 1984.

== Schools ==
Schools in Houghton Lake Community Schools district
School	Address	Notes
Houghton Lake Junior/Senior High School	4433 W. Houghton Lake Drive, Houghton Lake	Grades 7–12; built 1977
Collins Elementary	4451 W. Houghton Lake Drive, Houghton Lake	Grades PreK–6; built 1950
Houghton Lake Community Education	179 Cloverleaf Lane, Houghton Lake	Alternative high school, grades 9–12
