= Breitung Township Schools =

School district in Michigan

Address
- 810 Pyle Drive Kingsford, Dickinson, Michigan, 49802; United States

District information
- Grades: Kindergarten-12
- Superintendent: Aaron Yonke
- Schools: 3
- Budget: $26,325,000 2022-2023 expenditures
- NCES District ID: 2606720

Students and staff
- Students: 1,945 (2024-2025)
- Teachers: 112.97 (on an FTE basis) (2024-2025)
- Staff: 207.27 FTE (2024-2025)
- Student–teacher ratio: 17.22 (2024-2025)

Other information
- Website: www.kingsford.org

Breitung Township Schools is a public school district in the Upper Peninsula of Michigan. It serves Kingsford, Quinnesec, Breitung Township, and small parts of Iron Mountain.

== History ==
Breitung Township Schools was organized as a public school district in 1925. The mascot is the Flivver, or Ford Model T, a car that was built in a factory in Kingsford in the 1920s. The 1925 high school building was built on the south side of Hamilton Avenue at the end of Union Street.

The current high school and middle school building opened in 1965. In 1968, after three failed attempts to pass a funding millage, the district threatened to close an elementary school and eliminate high school sports and elementary physical education. High school sports were ultimately preserved through a community fundraising effort.

Woodland Elementary was built in 1989, and a middle school addition was built at the high school in 1991.

== Schools ==
Schools in Breitung Township Schools district
School	Address	Notes
Kingsford High School	431 Hamilton Avenue, Kingsford	Grades 9–12
Kingsford Middle School	445 Hamilton Avenue, Kingsford	Grades 5–8. Shares a building with Kingsford High School.
Woodland Elementary	2000 Pyle Drive, Kingsford	Grades PreK–4
