= Capac Community Schools =

School district in Michigan

Address
- 541 North Glassford Street Capac, St. Clair County, Michigan, 48014; United States

District information
- Motto: Capac strong. Learn. Dream. Grow.
- Grades: PreKindergarten–12
- Superintendent: Amy Nelson
- Schools: 3
- Budget: $13,201,000 2022–2023 expenditures
- NCES District ID: 2607800

Students and staff
- Students: 686 (2024–2025)
- Teachers: 36.69 (on an FTE basis) (2024–2025)
- Staff: 95.17 FTE (2024–2025)
- Student–teacher ratio: 18.7 (2024–2025)
- District mascot: Chiefs

Other information
- Website: www.capacschools.us

Capac Community Schools is a public school district in the Thumb region of Michigan. In St. Clair County, it serves Capac, Mussey Township, and parts of the townships of Berlin, Brockway, Emmett, Lynn, and Riley. In Lapeer County, it serves parts of Imlay Township.

== History ==
Nineteen independent school districts in the Capac area began the process of consolidating in April 1953. The consolidation would enable the funding of a new high school building, which opened in fall 1956. The architect was Charles M. Valentine of Marysville, Michigan. The current Capac Elementary opened in December 1966.

== Schools ==
Schools in Capac Community Schools district share a campus at 541 North Glassford Street in Capac.

Schools in Capac Community Schools district
School	Notes
Capac Junior/Senior High School	Grades 7–12
Capac Elementary	Grades PreK-6
Capac Virtual Education Program	Online school; grades K-12
