= Meridian Public Schools (Michigan) =

School district in Michigan, United States

Address
- 3361 North M-30 Sanford, Midland County, Michigan, 48657; United States

District information
- Grades: Pre-Kindergarten-12
- Superintendent: Sarah Glann
- Schools: 3
- Budget: $24,800,000 2022-2023 expenditures
- NCES District ID: 2623580

Students and staff
- Students: 1,374 (2024-2025)
- Teachers: 83.05 (on an FTE basis) (2024-2025)
- Staff: 211.59 FTE (2024-2025)
- Student–teacher ratio: 16.54 (2024-2025)

Other information
- Website: www.merps.org

Meridian Public Schools is a public school district in Midland County, Michigan. It serves Sanford, Hope Township, and parts of the townships of Edenville, Homer, Jerome, Larkin, Lee, and Lincoln.

== History ==
Meridian Public Schools was formed in June 1958 from six rural school districts. It is named after the Michigan meridian. The new district immediately set to building a new elementary and junior high school, and the bond issue to fund their construction passed in spring 1959.

Before building its own high school, the district's students attended Midland High School. Voters approved a new high school in 1960, and it was dedicated on December 9, 1962. The architect was Alden B. Dow.

In 1966, voters approved the construction of an even larger high school, and the conversion of the previous high school to a junior high, and the conversion of the previous junior high to an elementary school. Frederick E. Wigen of Saginaw designed the new building, and it opened in 1968.

A bond issue passed in 2006, and new spaces were constructed at the high school, junior high and Meridian Elementary, and the elementary school on West River Road became an early childhood center.

In 2012, Meridian High School joined the state's Early College High School program, which allows students to graduate with an associate degree or other college credits as well as a high school diploma within five years.

== Schools ==
Schools in Meridian Public Schools district
School	Address	Notes
Meridian Early College High School	3303 N. M–30, Sanford	Grades 9–12. Built 1968.
Meridian Junior High	3475 N. M–30, Sanford	Grades 5–8. Built 1962.
Meridian Elementary	3353 N. M–30, Sanford	Grades K-4
Meridian Early Childhood Center	2534 West River Rd., Sanford	Preschool and childcare
