= Martin High School (Martin, Michigan) =

Public school in Michigan, United States

Location
- 1556 Chalmers Street; Martin, Michigan; United States; 42°32′10″N 85°38′16″W

Information
- Type: Public
- Principal: Rebecca Lynema
- Teaching staff: 17.53 (on FTE basis)
- Grades: 6 to 12
- Enrollment: 330 (2025–2026)
- Student to teacher ratio: 18.82
- Colors: Maroon and white
- Athletics conference: Southwestern Athletic Conference
- Mascot: Ship
- Nickname: Clippers
- Website: www.martinpublicschools.org/highschool

Martin High School is a public school in Martin, Michigan. It is part of Martin Public Schools. It serves grades 6-12. The school is located at 1556 Chalmers Street. The athletic teams are the Martin Clippers. The school colors are maroon and white.

Martin High School serves a rural, primarily agricultural community. Martin Public enrolls approximatley 630 students from kindergarten through 12th grade, with approximately 330 students enrolled at the high school in grades 6-12.

== History ==
Martin built its first high school in 1888. The high school had a three-story structure. In 1908 the school burnt down. Then it was rebuilt in 1909. That building was used until 1965 when the present day Martin high school replaced it.

The first graduating class was in 1890 and had a total of 7 students. Jessie Anderson, Dot Campbell, Ernest Fenner, Delia Lamphire, Grace Nichols, Claude Ross and Alfer Wylie.

Martin Public Schools has existed for more than 130 years, with its origins tracing back to the Martin Rural Agricultural School. In the early 1930s, the institution evolved into what is now known as Martin Public Schools.

During the early 1930s, the community participated in selecting a mascot for the school. Residents were encouraged to place money into jars supporting proposed team names. According to local accounts, a farmer from nearby Orangeville Township contributed $10 in support of the "Onion King" mascot—an amount considered significant during the Great Depression. The name reflected the region's agricultural identity, as the Martin area was historically known for producing large onion crops.

From the early 1930s through 1949, the school's athletic teams were known as the Onion Kings. In 1950, Martin High School adopted the name "Maroons," which remained in use until 1957. In 1958, the school adopted the "Clippers" mascot, which has remained the official team name.

== Sports ==
=== Athletics ===
Martin High School fields athletic teams known as the Clippers and competes under the Michigan High School Athletic Association (MHSAA). Martin Clippers compete Boy's Varsity Cross Country, 8-man Football, Soccer, Basketball, Bowling, Wrestling, Baseball, Golf and Track and Field. Girl's Varsity Cross Country, Volleyball, Basketball, Bowling, Wrestling, Soccer, Softball, and Track and Field.

=== Football ===
The Martin football program began play in 1950, finishing with a 1–3–2 record in its inaugural season. For several decades, the program experienced limited success.

From 2008 through 2013, the team did not record a victory, part of a 56-game losing streak. While the following seasons showed some improvement, the program did not achieve a winning record or postseason appearance during that period.

A turning point came in 2018 with the hiring of head coach Brad Blauvelt, a 2003 graduate of the school. In his first season, Martin posted a 6–4 record and qualified for the playoffs for the first time since 2007.

In 2019, Martin achieved its first undefeated regular season in school history. Around this time, the program transitioned from 11-man to 8-man football, a format commonly used by smaller schools in Michigan.

From 2018 through 2025, Martin compiled a record of 73–10 (.879). The program won state championships in 2022, 2023, and 2025. The 2025 season also marked the first undefeated season in school history, as the team finished 13–0.

Through eight seasons as head coach, Blauvelt compiled a record of 73–14, with a winning percentage of .784.

Decade	GP	W-L-T	Ave.
1950	75	29-41-5	.42
1960	74	21-51-2	.297
1970	82	22-59-1	.274
1980	95	58-37	.611
1990	92	38-54	.413
2000	99	48-51	.485
2010	93	27-66	.29
2020	72	63-9	.875
Totals	682	306-368-8	.455

=== 2026 football season ===
The 2026 Michigan high school football season began on August 27, 2026, with teams across the state beginning their pursuit of a state championship.

One of the most notable opening-week matchups featured a rematch of the 2025 Michigan high school football state championship game. The defending state champion Martin Clippers opened the season against Blanchard Montabella, the team they defeated in the 2025 state final.

Martin dominated the 2025 championship game, defeating Blanchard Montabella 52–8 to capture the state championship. The two teams met again to open the 2026 season, giving Blanchard Montabella an immediate opportunity to challenge the defending champions in a rematch of the previous year's title game.

2026	Opponent	Result
August 27	Blanchard Montabella	L 12-62
September 04	Marcellus	L 22-34
September 11	Wyoming Triv-unity Christian	Cancel
September 18	Bridgman	L 32-36
September 25	Eau Clarie	
October 02	Muskegon Heights	
October 09	Grand Rapids Sacred Heart	
October 16	New Buffalo	
October 23	Middleton-Fulton	

=== Wrestling ===
The Martin wrestling program has produced multiple individual state champions and strong team finishes.

In 1983 and 1984, Martin had two individual state champions each year, with Al Torres (119 pounds) and Jim Dortch (167 pounds) winning titles. Kevin Dam (98 pounds) won in 1985, followed by Chris Pierce in 1986.

In 1987, Martin had two individual champions and finished as team state runner-up to Lawton High School. In 1988, Martin won the team state championship and had four individual champions.

In 1991, the team again finished as state runner-up, this time to Mendon High School.

Rick Mena won multiple state titles between 1998 and 2000. Additional champions during this period included Levi Conley (2000), Travis Brenner (2001), Josh Hildebrand (2002), and Tyler Brenner (2003).

In 2004, Martin finished as team state runner-up, losing to New Lothrop High School 36–33. Seth Conley later won a state championship in 2006.

The program continued to produce state placers in subsequent years, including multiple runners-up from 2007 to 2008 and again in 2018.

In the 2020s, Martin returned to prominence. Logan Gilbert won state championships in 2022 and 2024, while Haylen Buell won titles in 2024 and 2026. The team also finished as state runner-up in 2025, losing to Hudson High School.

== Fight song ==
The fight song of Martin Public School is performed following victories in football and basketball games. It is traditionally used to celebrate wins and reinforce school spirit. The song expresses loyalty to Martin High School, pride in its maroon and white colors, and support for the athletic teams known as the Martin Clippers. It is a key part of post-game celebrations and school tradition.

We are loyal to you, Martin High for your colors maroon and white as we sing your praises to the sky for the team and all its might on ward martin, win this game and carry us on to fame Go! Fight! VICTORY TONIGHT for the clippers if Martin High... Fight!

— Martin Public School Fight Song

== School records ==
=== Volleyball ===
Serving
Aces	Name	Record	Year
Match Aces	Makala Goddard	13	2022
Season Aces	Makala Goddard	156	2022
Career Aces	Makala Goddard	367	2020-2023
Career %	Makala Goddard	97%	2020-2023

Assists
Assists	Name	Record	Year
Match	Makala Goddard	45	2023
Season	Makala Goddard	35	2023
Career	Makala Goddard	2260	2020-23

Kills
Kills	Name	Record	Year
Match	Mackenzie Schwartz	21	2025
Season	Avery Jager	347	2023
Career	Katelin Bird	698	2021-24

Blocks
Blocks	Name	Record	Year
Match	Katelin Bird	8	2022
Season	Katelin Bird	58	2022
Career	Katelin Bird	221	2021-24

Digs
Digs	Name	Record	Year
Match	Kendra Goddard	36	2025
Season	Kendra Goddard	444	2025
Career	Kendra Goddard	635	2024-25
