= Bangor Public Schools (Van Buren County, Michigan) =

School district in Michigan

Address
- 801 West Arlington Street Bangor, Van Buren County, Michigan, 49013; United States

District information
- Grades: PreKindergarten–12
- Superintendent: Lynn Johnson
- Schools: 4
- Budget: $19,157,000 2022-2023 expenditures
- NCES District ID: 2603870

Students and staff
- Students: 951 (2024-2025)
- Teachers: 75.24 (on an FTE basis) (2024-2025)
- Staff: 160.93 FTE (2024-2025)
- Student–teacher ratio: 12.64 (2024-2025)

Other information
- Website: www.bangorvikings.org

Bangor Public Schools is a public school district in Van Buren County in West Michigan. It serves Bangor, Breedsville, and parts of the townships of Arlington, Bangor, Columbia, Covert, Geneva, and Waverly.

== History ==
The current Bangor High School opened around 1967. The former high school, part of which was built in 1902, became the district's middle school. By 1973, overcrowding had led to the high school being shared with grades five and six on a split-day basis, and some classes were being held in an old fire station. Voters had turned down a succession of nine bond issues. In April 1974, voters approved funding for the new middle school, which would be attached to the high school, and it opened in fall 1976.

By the late 1990s, the district needed to reduce the student-to-teacher ratio by increasing the number of elementary classrooms. Bond issues were proposed to shift grade levels at Bangor Primary School and South Walnut Elementary School, as well as update technology and make repairs, especially to the heating system at South Walnut Elementary. Voters did not approve the bond issues, and the heating system at South Walnut Elementary became an ongoing crisis. As it was impossible to regulate the building's temperature, heat caused food to melt and sapped the energy of students. Heating pipes occasionally burst with students nearby. The problems went beyond the heating system. The building had deteriorated and the wooden partitions between hallways and classrooms were a fire hazard.

After seven failed bond issue votes between 1998 and 2003, in March 2004, voters approved a bond issue that focused on the renovation of South Walnut Elementary. The building was completely renovated and a new heating system was installed. Although no general classrooms were added, a special education wing was constructed for Van Buren Intermediate School District. Construction began in October 2004 and was completed around January 2006. To improve other schools in the district, bond issues also passed in 2012 and 2023.

== Bangor Township School District No. 8 ==
Fully encompassed by the boundary of Bangor Public Schools is the independent school district Bangor Township School District No. 8, whose only school is a frame one-room schoolhouse called Wood School. It has two teachers and houses 24 students (as of the 2024–2025 school year) in grades kindergarten through eight. Located at 66th Street at 30th Avenue, Wood School was established in 1849 and its current building was built in 1869, although improvements such as indoor plumbing have kept it modern. It accepts students from outside of its district and offers a unique, close-knit learning environment and a very low student-to-teacher ratio. Upon graduation from eighth grade, Wood students can attend Bangor High School or other districts' high schools.

== Schools ==
Schools in Bangor Public Schools district
School	Address	Notes
Bangor High School	801 West Arlington Street, Bangor	Grades 9–12; built 1967
Bangor Middle School	803 West Arlington Road, Bangor	Grades 5–8; built 1976
South Walnut Elementary	309 South Walnut, Bangor	Grades PreK-4
Bangor Career Academy	801 West Arlington Road, Bangor	Alternative school
