= North Branch Area Schools =

School district in Michigan

Address
- 6655 Jefferson Street North Branch, Lapeer, Michigan, 48461; United States

District information
- Grades: Pre-Kindergarten-12
- Superintendent: Jim Fish
- Schools: 4
- Budget: $32,867,000 2022-2023 expenditures
- NCES District ID: 2625680

Students and staff
- Students: 2,431 (2024-2025)
- Teachers: 131.75 (on an FTE basis) (2024-2025)
- Staff: 320.93 (on an FTE basis) (2024-2025)
- Student–teacher ratio: 18.45 (2024-2025)

Other information
- Website: www.nbbroncos.net

North Branch Area Schools is a public school district in Lapeer County, Michigan. It serves North Branch, parts of Barnes Lake and Millers Lake, and parts of the townships of Arcadia, Burlington, Deerfield, North Branch, and Rich.

== History ==
In 1855, the first school in North Branch was established. It was a private school in a ramshackle building. In 1856, a public school district was established, but it did not establish a school until 1861. As of 1867, the public school was flourishing, albeit in a log building, with 76 students enrolled.

In 1869, a frame schoolhouse was built near the corner of Jefferson and Mill Streets. In 1883, students were divided into ten grades, and in 1889, a brick school was built. The high school was accredited by the University of Michigan in 1914, marking the official establishment of North Branch High School.

The high school building was torn down in 1935, leaving the students without a school. Various locations around the village served as classrooms. In fall 1936, the Education Services Building was built as the high school with construction funds from the Public Works Administration.

Sweet school district and its school, Sweet Elementary, consolidated with the North Branch district in 1957.

A new high school was completed in spring 1963 and opened in fall 1963. The building is currently used as Ruth Fox Middle School.

The current high school, designed by architecture firm SSOE, opened in fall 1994. The previous high school became a school for grades seven and eight, and the former junior high became a school for grades four through six.

North Branch Elementary opened in fall 2008. At that time, Sweet Elementary closed, and the former North Branch Elementary became the Educational Services Center.

== Schools ==
Schools in North Branch Area Schools district
School	Address	Notes
North Branch High School	6598 Brush Street, North Branch	Grades 9–12. Built 1994.
Ruth Fox Middle School	6570 Brush Street, North Branch	Grades 5–8. Built 1963.
North Branch Elementary	4055 Elm Creek Road, North Branch	Grades K-4. Built 2008.
Early Childhood Learning Center	6655 Jefferson St., North Branch	Preschool and child care center located in Educational Services Center. Built 1936.
Quest High School	6655 Jefferson Street, North Branch	Alternative high school located in Educational Services Center.
