= White Pigeon Community Schools =

School district in Michigan

Address
- 410 East Prairie Avenue White Pigeon, St. Joseph County, Michigan, 49099; United States

District information
- Grades: PreKindergarten–12
- Superintendent: Shelly McBride
- Schools: 2
- Budget: $12,777,000 2022-2023 expenditures
- NCES District ID: 2636120

Students and staff
- Students: 729 (2024-2025)
- Teachers: 45.2 (on an FTE basis) (2024-2025)
- Staff: 92.75 FTE (2024-2025)
- Student–teacher ratio: 16.13 (2024-2025)
- District mascot: Chiefs

Other information
- Website: www.wpcschools.org

White Pigeon Community Schools is a public school district in southwest Michigan. In St. Joseph County, it serves White Pigeon, White Pigeon Township, and parts of the townships of Mottville and Florence. It also serves part of Porter Township in Cass County.

== History ==
The first class graduated from White Pigeon High School in 1873. Central Elementary School was built around 1955.

The current Junior/Senior High School opened in January 1967.

Despite many districts changing their Native American mascots, White Pigeon Community Schools stands by its "Chiefs" mascot because White Pigeon was named after Chief Wahbememe, a Potawatomi Chief from the early 1800s whose name translates to White Pigeon. He is buried near the town named after him.

== Schools ==
Schools in White Pigeon Community Schools district
School	Address	Notes
White Pigeon Junior/Senior High School	410 Prairie Avenue, White Pigeon	Grades 6–12. Built 1967.
Central Elementary	305 E. Hotchin Avenue, White Pigeon	Grades PreK-5.
