= Wayland Union Schools =

School district in Michigan

Address
- 850 E. Superior St. Wayland, Allegan, Michigan, 49348; United States

District information
- Grades: Pre-Kindergarten-12
- Superintendent: Tim Reeves
- Schools: 7
- Budget: $43,035,000 2022-2023 expenditures
- NCES District ID: 2635550

Students and staff
- Students: 2,729 (2024-2025)
- Teachers: 185.74 (on an FTE basis) (2024-2025)
- Staff: 407.78 FTE (2024-2025)
- Student–teacher ratio: 14.69 (2024-2025)

Other information
- Website: waylandunion.org

Wayland Union Schools is a public school district in West Michigan. In Allegan County, it serves Wayland and parts of Dorr Township, Hopkins Township, Leighton Township, and Wayland Township. In Barry County, it serves part of Yankee Springs Township. In Kent County it serves part of Byron Township.

== History ==
As of 1884, a Union School was providing education in Wayland. According to the Grand Rapids Eagle that year, "The Wayland Union School is a live institution in a live little village and the citizens take a lively interest in educational matters."

In 1940, members of the Wayland school community were considering consolidating further with primary school districts in the surrounding townships, based on the examples of Kellogg Agricultural High School (whose district was later absorbed into Gull Lake Community Schools) and Thornapple Kellogg School District. Later that month, voters in the district petitioned the Will Keith Kellogg Child Welfare Foundation, precursor to the W. K. Kellogg Foundation, to financially assist in consolidating and building a new school, as it had helped the other districts. The foundation offered $150,000, which voters agreed to combine with $30,000 in bond issues for construction. The new building, which included all grades and the high school, was under construction by 1941. The architect was Lewis J. Sarvis of Battle Creek, Michigan.

The current high school was built in 1973, and the 1941 building became a middle school. In February 1996, the district unveiled an expansion and renovation at the high school. The current middle school was completed in fall, 1996. The 1941 building is currently Pine Street Elementary.

In 2010, a performing arts center with an 800-seat auditorium opened at the high school.

== Schools ==
Schools in Wayland Union Schools district
School	Address	Notes
Baker Elementary	507 W. Sycamore Street, Wayland	Grades PreK-1.
Dorr Elementary	4159 18th Street, Dorr	Grades PreK-5.
Steeby Elementary	435 E. Superior Street, Wayland	Grades 2-3.
Pine Street Elementary	201 Pine Street, Wayland	Grades 4-5. Built 1941.
Wayland Union Middle School	701 Wildcat Drive, Wayland	Grades 6-8. Built 1996.
Wayland Union High School	870 E. Superior Street, Wayland	Grades 9-12. Built 1973.
Career Connections Academy	870 E. Superior Street, Wayland	Career and technical classes for grades 9-12.
