= Northview Public Schools =

School district in Michigan

Address
- 4365 Hunsberger Ave NE Grand Rapids, Kent, Michigan, 49525; United States

District information
- Motto: Our best. Your best.
- Grades: Pre-Kindergarten-12
- Superintendent: Dr. Christina Hinds
- Schools: 8
- Budget: $67,530,000 2022-2023 expenditures
- NCES District ID: 2625950

Students and staff
- Students: 3,173 (2024-2025)
- Teachers: 186.43 (on an FTE basis) (2024-2025)
- Staff: 382.61 FTE (2024-2025)
- Student–teacher ratio: 17.02 (2024-2025)
- District mascot: Wildcats

Other information
- Website: nvps.net

Northview Public Schools is a public school district in the Grand Rapids, Michigan area. It serves the Northview portion of Plainfield Township and parts of Grand Rapids, Grand Rapids Township and Ada Township.

The high school, Crossroads Middle School, North Oakview Elementary, and the district administration building share a campus on the west side of Hunsberger Avenue NE.

== History ==
Oakview school district, Northview Public Schools' predecessor, was formed in 1859. It and three other districts north of Grand Rapids (Atwater, Richardson, and Peach Grove) did not have high schools of their own, so they consolidated around 1960 to form Northview Public Schools to request a bond issue to build a high school. The high school opened in fall 1962. The first class graduated in 1965.

Additions were built at the high school in 1971 and 1998. In 2014, the 1961 section was rebuilt and the newer sections were renovated.

== Schools ==
Schools in Northview Public Schools district
School	Address	Notes
Northview High School	4451 Hunsberger Avenue NE, Grand Rapids	Grades 9-12
Crossroads Middle School	4400 Ambrose Avenue NE, Grand Rapids	Grades 7-8
East Oakview Elementary	3940 Suburban Shores NE, Grand Rapids	Grades K-4
Field School	Various locations	Outdoor education school for grades 1-6.
Highlands School	4645 Chandy Drive NE, Grand Rapids	Grades 5-6
North Oakview Elementary	4300 Costa NE, Grand Rapids	Grades K-4
West Oakview Elementary	3880 Stuyvesant Avenue NE, Grand Rapids	Grades PreK-4
Northview Next Career Center	3801 E Beltline Ave NE, Grand Rapids	Career training for ages 15-20.
Northview Next Learning Center	5365 Plainfield Avenue NE, Grand Rapids	Alternative high school. Grades 9-12
