= Ironwood Area Schools of Gogebic County =

School district in Michigan

Address
- 650 E. Ayer St. Ironwood, Gogebic County, Michigan, 49938; United States

District information
- Grades: Kindergarten–12
- Superintendent: Daniel Martinson
- Schools: 2
- Budget: $11,039,000 2022-2023 expenditures
- NCES District ID: 2619470

Students and staff
- Students: 815 (2024-2025)
- Teachers: 65.74 (on an FTE basis) (2024-2025)
- Staff: 119.08 FTE (2024-2025)
- Student–teacher ratio: 12.4 (2024-2025)

Other information
- Website: www.ironwoodschools.org

Ironwood Area Schools of Gogebic County is a public school district in Gogebic County, in the Upper Peninsula of Michigan. It serves Ironwood, Erwin Township, and Ironwood Township.

== History ==
Ironwood's school district was organized in 1885, and several schools were built over the next several years. The first class graduated in 1890. The previous Luther L. Wright High School, named after a district superintendent, was built in 1900. As of 1909, the district had 2,751 students across ten buildings.

Two notable early buildings in the district were the School of Domestic Science (built in 1904 and expanded in 1909) and the Manual Training Building (built in 1908). Organized along gender lines, these facilities were considered innovative for their time and were equipped for extensive hands-on instruction. The School of Domestic Science offered courses for girls in sewing, cooking, and housekeeping, with two kitchens, three sewing rooms, and a model home for practice. The Manual Training Building provided boys with training in trades such as carpentry, blacksmithing, and foundry work.

The district's Central School burned down in 1913, prompting a building program that included Newport and Norris elementary schools. In 1924, 107 seniors graduated.

Groundbreaking for the current Luther L. Wright High School was May 1, 1924, and it opened in September 1925. It was dedicated in February 1926. The architect was Croft & Boerner of Minneapolis.

The district operated three elementary schools as of 1991: Newport, Norrie, and Sleight. But by 1997, the schools were in need of considerable repair and renovation. In 1998, Percy R. Smith, district superintendent, wrote a letter to the Ironwood Daily Globe discussing the closure of the schools, calling them "inefficient" and "functionally obsolete."

In 2009, a bond issue passed to renovate and build an addition at Luther L. Wright High School.

Sleight Elementary, built in 1930, was the last elementary to close, in June 2014. The Wright building was then configured as a K-12 school, with grades kindergarten through second on the first floor, seventh through twelfth grades on the upper floor, and the middle grades on the second floor.

== Schools ==
Luther L. Wright K-12 School, at 650 East Ayer Street in Ironwood, is the only school building in the district. It also contains the alternative high school Gogebic County Community Education.
