= Quincy Community Schools =

School district in Michigan, United States

Address
- 1 Educational Parkway Quincy, Branch County, Michigan, 49082; United States

District information
- Grades: Kindergarten–12
- Superintendent: John Denney
- Schools: 3
- Budget: $14,226,000 2021-2022 expenditures
- NCES District ID: 2629250

Students and staff
- Students: 1,099 (2024-2025)
- Teachers: 61.43 (on an FTE basis) (2024-2025)
- Staff: 107.01 FTE (2024-2025)
- Student–teacher ratio: 17.89 (2024-2025)

Other information
- Website: www.quincyschools.org

Quincy Community Schools is a public school district in Southern Michigan. In Branch County, it serves Quincy and parts of the townships of Algansee, Butler, California, Coldwater, Ovid, and Quincy. In Hillsdale County, it serves parts of Allen Township and Litchfield Township.

== History ==
According to a district history published in a Quincy High School yearbook, Quincy's first school was held in a log structure in 1836. In 1842, the first frame school was built, and it was moved to another site in 1850. A church acquired the land on which the school stood, requiring the building to be relocated once again. A dispute then arose between residents on the east and west sides of Main Street, each of whom wanted the school on their side of the street. The matter was settled by a contest in which teams of oxen from each side attempted to pull the school toward their respective sides. The east side prevailed.

1858 saw the first brick school built in Quincy, and an addition was built in 1904. The first high school class graduated in 1874, but graduations were sporadic for the next several years.

On the southeast corner of Fulton and East Jefferson Streets, Quincy High School (now Quincy Middle School) opened in January 1932. Harold Davenport of the prolific school architecture firm Lane, Davenport and Peterson presented the school to the school board during its dedication on January 8, 1932. The old school was then torn down.

Fifteen outlying school districts merged with Quincy's school district in 1946. In 1955, the district continued to operate seven rural schoolhouses. A vocational wing was built at the high school in 1955.

Jennings Elementary, named after district superintendent E.J. Jennings, was also built in 1955. It received additions in 1962 and 1969.

As of 1956, the district had steady enrollment of 1,144 students, including in three outlying rural elementary schools: Mudge, Allen, and Shooks Prairie. The district had 78 teachers and 17 buses. Seven more small school districts had consolidated with Quincy by then, and several of the district's rural schoolhouses closed that year.

On February 3, 1962, the current Quincy High School (an addition to the 1932 building) was dedicated. The architect was Louis C. Kingscott and Associates. The new school's common room, used as a study hall, featured a television set built into a wall that was "equipped to receive educational UHF stations as well as regular broadcasts," noted a description of the school in the 1962 yearbook.

$8.52 million in bond issues were passed in 2014 to fund a new auxiliary gym, locker rooms, and a fitness center at the high school, and other renovations at schools in the district.

== High school gymnasium ==
In 2015, Quincy High School's gym was voted the "coolest" in Michigan by readers of the online newspaper MLive. The gym was noted for its arched natural wood beams and tall windows, but especially for the atmosphere created by cheering students during games. Quincy beat Charlotte High School in the poll, which came in at second place, and was designed by the same architect several years later. Charlotte and Quincy High Schools together earned about twelve times the votes of the next eight schools combined.

== Schools ==
Schools in Quincy Community Schools district
School	Address	Notes
Quincy High School	18 Colfax Street, Quincy	Grades 9–12. Built 1962.
Quincy Middle School	32 Fulton Street, Quincy	Grades 5–8. Shares a building with Quincy High School. Built 1932.
Jennings Elementary	44 East Liberty Street, Quincy	Grades K–4. Built 1955.
