= St. Louis Public Schools (Michigan) =

School district in Michigan

Address
- 113 East Saginaw Street St. Louis, Gratiot County, Michigan, 48880; United States

District information
- Grades: PreKindergarten–12
- Superintendent: Jennifer McKittrick
- Schools: 4
- Budget: $17,600,000 2022-2023 expenditures
- NCES District ID: 2632880

Students and staff
- Students: 882 (2024-2025)
- Teachers: 57.17 (on an FTE basis) (2024-2025)
- Staff: 129.72 FTE (2024-2025)
- Student–teacher ratio: 15.43 (2024-2025)
- District mascot: Sharks

Other information
- Website: www.stlouisschools.net

St. Louis Public Schools is a public school district in Central Michigan. In Gratiot County, it serves St. Louis and parts of the townships of Bethany, Emerson, and Pine River. In Isabella County, it serves part of Coe Township. In Midland County, it serves parts of Greendale Township and Jasper Township.

== History ==
The 1923 St. Louis High School yearbook illustrates the schools in operation at that time: A high school, a ward school, and a frame primary school.

In 1932, St. Louis High School was destroyed by fire. In fall 1932, the school year began in temporary quarters, but the rebuilt school opened in time for the graduation ceremony for the class of 1933. A gymnasium building was added in 1959.

Carrie Knause Elementary opened in fall 1955, named after a long-serving teacher and St. Louis resident.

A building program was begun in 1967 to build Nurnberger Middle School and Nikkari Elementary, originally called State Street Elementary. The buildings were dedicated on October 26, 1969.

A $5.3 million construction project was completed at St. Louis High School in fall 1996. The 1933 section was demolished, and the 1959 building received an extensive addition.

== Schools ==
Schools in St. Louis Public Schools district
School	Address	Notes
St. Louis High School	113 E Saginaw Street, St. Louis	Grades 9–12. Built 1959, expanded 1996.
T. S. Nurnberger Middle School	312 Union Street, St. Louis	Grades 6–8. Built 1969.
Nikkari Elementary	301 W State Street, St. Louis	Grades 3-5. Built 1969.
Carrie Knause Elementary	121 I and K Street, St. Louis	Grades PreK-2. Built 1955.
