= Munising Public Schools =

School district in Michigan

Address
- 810 State Highway M-28 West Munising, Alger County, Michigan, 49862; United States

District information
- Grades: PreKindergarten–12
- Superintendent: Mike Travis
- Schools: 2
- Budget: $9,685,000 2022–2023 expenditures
- NCES District ID: 2624810

Students and staff
- Students: 558 (2024–2025)
- Teachers: 35.37 (on an FTE basis) (2024–2025)
- Staff: 94.36 FTE (2024–2025)
- Student–teacher ratio: 15.78 (2024–2025)
- District mascot: Mustangs

Other information
- Website: www.munisingschools.com

Munising Public Schools is a public school district in the Upper Peninsula of Michigan. In Alger County, it serves Munising, the townships of Grand Island and Munising, and part of Au Train Township. It also serves part of Hiawatha Township in Schoolcraft County.

== History ==
The first school in Munising was known as the Froebel school, and originally held all grades. It was built in 1897 on Chocolay Street and served as a school until 1925.

Munising's former Central School was built in 1902. On December 21, 1920, it was destroyed by fire. William G. Mather Elementary was originally the district's high school, and opened in fall 1922 to replace the burned building.

Due to inadequate facilities and a shortened school day, Munising's high school temporarily lost its accreditation in 1977. The current middle/high school was built in 1980. Later that year, Munising High's football team won the Class C state championship at the Pontiac Silverdome.

Munising's public library, known as a "school public library," is located within the middle/high school.

== Schools ==
Schools in Munising Public Schools
School	Address	Notes
Munising Middle/High School	810 M-28 West, Munising	Grades 6–12
William G. Mather Elementary	411 Elm Avenue, Munising	Grades PreK-5
