= Bloomingdale Public Schools =

School district in Michigan, United States

Address
- 629 E Kalamazoo Street Bloomingdale, Van Buren County, Michigan, 49026; United States

District information
- Grades: Kindergarten-12
- Superintendent: Rick Reo
- Schools: 3
- Budget: $16,203,000 2022-2023 expenditures
- NCES District ID: 2606270

Students and staff
- Students: 953 (2024-2025)
- Teachers: 62.84 (on an FTE basis) (2024-2025)
- Staff: 132.59 FTE (2024-2025)
- Student–teacher ratio: 15.17 (2024-2025)

Other information
- Website: www.bdalecards.com

Bloomingdale Public Schools is a public school district in West Michigan. In Van Buren County, it serves Bloomingdale and parts of the townships of Bloomingdale, Columbia, and Waverly. In Allegan County, it serves parts of the townships of Casco, Cheshire, and Lee.

== History ==
A new Bloomingdale High School opened in May 1963. Part of the former high school nearby was then torn down and rebuilt to become Bloomingdale Elementary.

In fall 2004, the current high school opened, connected to the high school built in 1963, which became the district's middle school. The architect was URS Corporation.

== Schools ==
Schools in Bloomingdale Public Schools district
School	Address	Notes
Bloomingdale Middle/High School	629 E Kalamazoo St., Bloomingdale	Grades 6–12
Bloomingdale Elementary	307 E. Willow, Bloomingdale	Grades K-5
Pullman Elementary	5580 South Ave, Pullman	Grades K-5
STRIVE Academy	629 E Kalamazoo St., Bloomingdale	Alternative high school with online options
