= List of Michigan High School Association member conferences =

This is a list of high school association member conferences in the state of Michigan.

== Class A ==
- Big North Conference
- Capital Area Activities Conference
- Catholic High School League
- Detroit Public School League
- Downriver League
- Flint Metro League
- Kensington Lakes Activities Association
- Lakes Valley Conference
- Macomb Area Conference
- Oakland Activities Association
- Ottawa-Kent Conference
- Saginaw Valley League
- Southeastern Conference
- Southwestern Michigan Athletic Conference
- Tri-Valley Conference
- Western Wayne Athletic Conference

== Class B ==
- BCS League
- Blue Water Area Conference
- Capital Area Activities Conference
- Cascades Conference
- Catholic High School League (AA Div.)
- Central State Activities Association
- Charter School Conference
- Detroit Public School League
- Genesee Area Conference
- Great Northern UP Conference
- Greater Lansing Activities Conference
- Huron League
- Independent
- Interstate 8 Athletic Conference
- Lakes 8 Activities Conference
- Lenawee County Athletic Association
- Macomb Area Conference
- Michigan Metro Athletic Conference
- Northern Michigan Football Conference
- Ottawa-Kent Conference
- Southern Michigan Football Conference
- Southwestern Michigan Athletic Conference
- Straits Area Conference
- Tri-Valley Conference
- West Michigan Conference
- West-Pac Conference
- Wolverine Conference

== Class C ==
- BCS League
- Big 8 Conference
- Cascade Conference
- Catholic High School League
- Central Michigan 8-Man
- Central Michigan Athletic Conference
- Central State Activities Association (Silver Div.)
- Charter School Conference
- Detroit Public School League
- Genesee Area Conference
- Greater Thumb Conference
- Highland Conference
- Jack Pine Conference
- Kalamazoo Valley Association
- Lake Michigan Conference
- Lakeland Athletic Conference
- Lenawee County Athletic Association
- Macomb Area Conference
- Metro Conference
- Michigan Independent Athletic Conference
- Mid-Eastern Football Conference
- Mid-Peninsula Athletic Conference
- Mid-State Activities Conference South
- North Central Thumb 8-Man League
- North Star League
- Northern Michigan Football Conference
- Northwest Conference
- Ottawa-Kent Conference
- Red Arrow Conference
- Southern Central Athletic Association
- Southern Michigan Football Conference
- Southwestern Athletic Conference
- Straits Area Conference
- Tri-County Conference
- West Michigan Conference
- West-Pac
- Western Michigan 'D' League

== Class D ==
- Alliance League
- BCS League
- Big 8 Conference
- Bridge Alliance 8 Man
- Catholic High School League (Intersectional 2)
- Central Michigan Athletic Conference
- Christian Football League
- Great Western Conference
- Independent
- Lakes 8 Activities Conference
- Lenawee County Athletic Association
- Michigan Independent Athletic Conference
- Mid-Eastern Football Conference
- Mid-Michigan 8-Man Football League
- Mid-State Activities Conference South
- North Central Thumb 8-Man League
- North Star League
- Northern Michigan Football Conference
- Northwest Conference
- Red Arrow Conference
- Skii Valley Conference
- Southern Central Athletic Association
- Southern Michigan 8-Man Football League
- Southern Michigan Football Conference
- Southwestern Athletic Conference (North Div.)
- Tri-Valley Conference
- Western Michigan 'D' League

== See also ==
List of high schools in Michigan
