= BCS League =

Sports league

Berrien-Cass-St. Joseph League
- Conference: Michigan High School Athletic Association (MHSAA)
- Founded: 2014
- No. of teams: 3 Class C, 6 Class D
- Region: Southwest Michigan

Locations
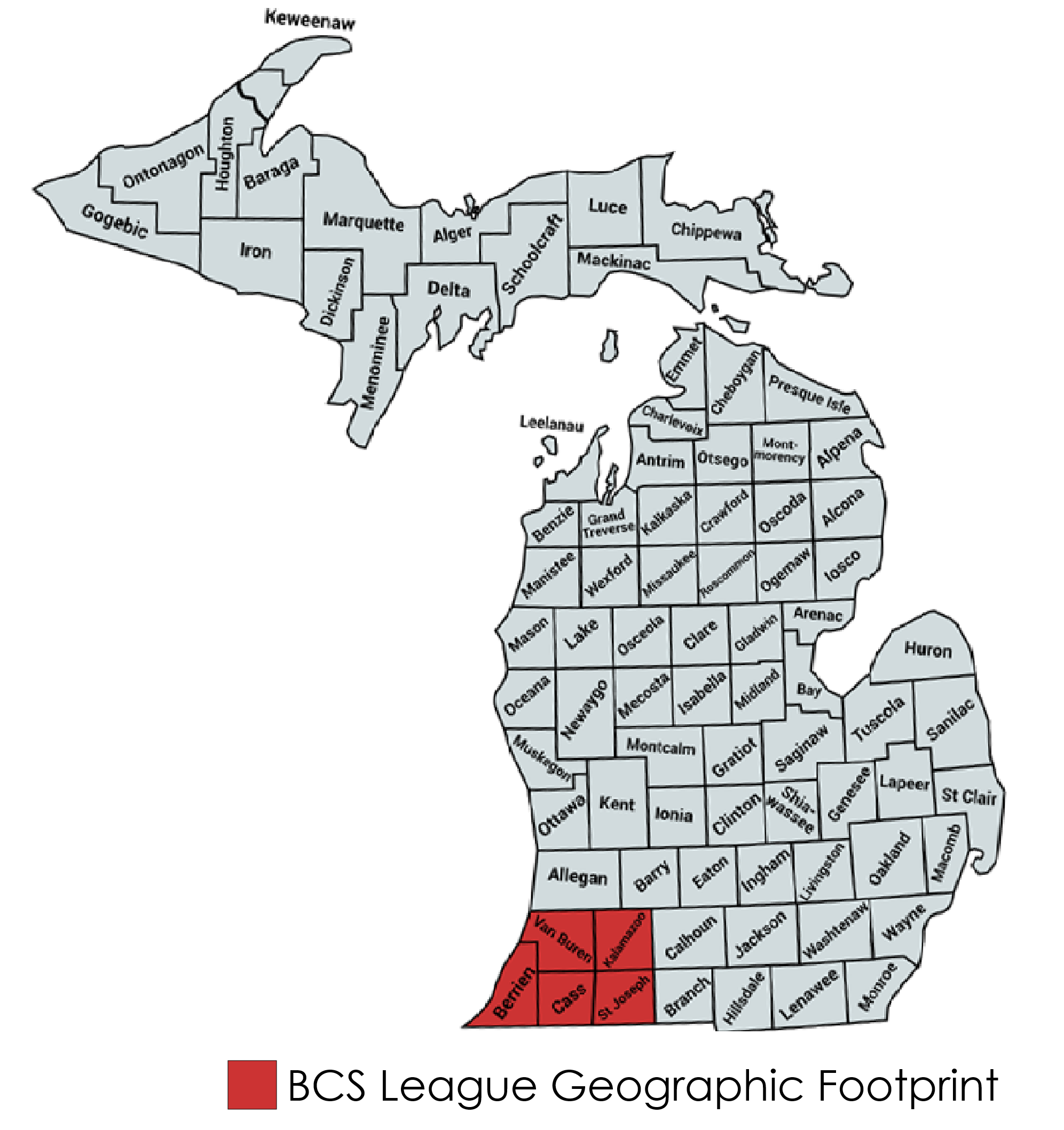

The Berrien-Cass-St. Joseph (BCS) League is an athletic conference for high schools in southwest Michigan. Founded in 2014 with the inaugural season of play in 2014-15, the conference aspired to grow into a Southwest Michigan "super conference" with membership extending across all MHSAA classes and organized into divisions of schools with similar enrollments. Periodic realignment of divisions allowed members to remain in competition with like-sized schools within the conference thereby avoiding the disruptive effects of conference switching due to changing enrollment. The conference had a unique scheduling philosophy that did not force members to play against conference opponents in different divisions and respected the freedom of members to schedule rivals and other willing conference opponents regardless of size or division.

Between 2017 and 2021, the BCS experienced frequent membership changes with eight schools departing & five schools joining. A final attempt to realize its "super-conference" aspiration was attempted in 2019, when membership invitations were extended to ten schools of diverse enrollments. Niles and South Haven were the only two that accepted. However, Niles departed after only a single season and South Haven exited after two seasons. When expansion proved unsuccessful, the remaining larger schools decided to leave for other conferences. Beginning with the 2022-2023 season, the BCS transitioned into being a league catering to small public and private schools in southwest Michigan.

== Sponsored Sports ==
=== Boys ===
Baseball, Basketball, Cross Country, Golf, Soccer, Tennis, Track and Field, Wrestling

=== Girls ===
Basketball, Cross Country, Soccer, Softball, Tennis, Track & Field, Volleyball

== Member schools ==
There are currently 9 member schools. The geographic footprint of the league includes Berrien, Cass, Kalamazoo, St. Joseph and Van Buren counties in Michigan.

=== Current members ===
School data in the table below is current for the 2023-24 season according to the MHSAA website.

School	Location	Mascot	Colors	Enrollment	Class	Sports Division	Football Division	Affiliation	Joined	Previous Conference
Benton Harbor Countryside Academy	Benton Township	Cougars	Blue & White	179	C	BCS	n/a	Public Charter	2016	Red Arrow Conference
Covert	Covert Township	Bulldogs	Navy Blue & Gold	107	D	BCS	n/a	Public	2017	Southwestern Athletic Conference
Eau Claire	Eau Claire	Fighting Beavers	Maroon & White	175	C	BCS	n/a †	Public	2020	Southwest 10 Conference
Marcellus Howardsville Christian	Flowerfield Township	Eagles	Red & White	62	D	BCS	n/a	Private	2016	Red Arrow Conference
New Buffalo	New Buffalo	Bisons	Royal Blue & Gold	178	C	BCS	n/a †	Public	2014	Red Arrow Conference
Our Lady of the Lake Catholic	St. Joseph	Lakers	Royal Blue, Gold & White	61	D	BCS	n/a †	Private	2014	Red Arrow Conference
St. Joseph Michigan Lutheran	Royalton Township	Titans	Purple & White	114	D	BCS	n/a †	Private	2015	Red Arrow Conference
Three Oaks River Valley	Chikaming Township	Mustangs	Navy & White	155	D	BCS	n/a	Public	2015	Red Arrow Conference
Watervliet Grace Christian	Bainbridge Township	Patriots	Royal Blue, Gold & White	19	D	BCS	n/a	Private	2016	Red Arrow Conference

† 8-man football team that is a member of the Southwest Michigan 8-man Football League

=== Former members ===
School	Location	Joined	Previous Conference	Departed	Successive Conference
Berrien Springs Shamrocks	Berrien Springs	2015	Wolverine Conference	2022	Lakeland Conference
Bridgman Bees	Bridgman	2014	Lakeland Athletic Conference	2022	Southwestern Athletic Conference
Bronson Vikings	Bronson	2014	St. Joseph Valley League	2017	Big 8 Conference
Buchanan Bucks	Buchanan	2014	Lakeland Athletic Conference	2022	Lakeland Conference
Cassopolis Rangers	Jefferson Township	2014	Lakeland Athletic Conference	2017	Southwest 10 Conference
Centreville Bulldogs	Centreville	2014	St. Joseph Valley League	2017	Southwest 10 Conference
Comstock Colts	Comstock Township	2015	Kalamazoo Valley Association	2021	Southwest 10 Conference
Lawrence Tigers	Lawrence	2015	Southwestern Athletic Conference	2022	Southwest 10 Conference
Mendon Hornets	Mendon	2014	St. Joseph Valley League	2017	Southwest 10 Conference
Niles Vikings	Niles	2020	Southwestern Michigan Athletic Conference	2021	Wolverine Conference
Brandywine Bobcats	Niles Township	2014	Lakeland Athletic Conference	2022	Lakeland Conference
Parchment Panthers	Parchment	2015	Kalamazoo Valley Association	2020	Southwestern Athletic Conference
South Haven Rams	South Haven	2020	Wolverine Conference	2022	Southwestern Athletic Conference
White Pigeon Chiefs	White Pigeon	2014	St. Joseph Valley League	2017	Southwest 10 Conference

== League championships ==
=== Baseball ===
	Red Division		White Division		Blue Division	
Season	School	Division Record	School	Division Record	School	Division Record
2015						
2016						
2017						
2018						
2019						
2020						
2021	Buchanan		Bridgman	17-1		
2022	Buchanan	7-1				

=== Boys Basketball ===
	Red Division		White Division		Blue Division		BCS Division	
Season	School	Division Record	School	Division Record	School	Division Record	School	Division Record
2015	Bridgman	7-1	Cassopolis	7-1				
2016	Bridgman & Niles Brandywine	8-2	Marcellus Howardsville Christian	9-1	Cassopolis	9-1		
2017	Niles Brandywine	9-1	Marcellus Howardsville Christian	7-1	Cassopolis	8-2		
2018	Parchment	9-1	Marcellus Howardsville Christian, New Buffalo & St. Joseph Lake Michigan Catholic	10-2				
2019	Niles Brandywine	9-1	Marcellus Howardsville Christian	13-0				
2020	Niles Brandywine	8-2	Three Oaks River Valley	14-0				
2021	Niles Brandywine	5-0	Marcellus Howardsville Christian	8-0				
2022	Niles Brandywine	5-1	New Buffalo	9-0				
2023							Eau Claire	13-1

=== Girls Basketball ===
	Red Division		White Division		Blue Division	
Season	School	Division Record	School	Division Record	School	Division Record
2015	Niles Brandywine	8-0	Bronson	7-1		
2016	Niles Brandywine	10-0	St. Joseph Michigan Lutheran	8-0	Mendon	9-1
2017	Buchanan & Comstock	9-1	St. Joseph Michigan Lutheran	8-0	Centreville	10-0
2018	Comstock	10-0	St. Joseph Michigan Lutheran	12-0		
2019	Comstock	10-0	St. Joseph Michigan Lutheran	9-1		
2020	Niles Brandywine	10-0	St. Joseph Michigan Lutheran	13-1		
2021	Buchanan	6-0	St. Joseph Michigan Lutheran & New Buffalo	8-1		
2022	Buchanan & Niles Brandywine	5-1	Bridgman	6-0		

=== Football ===
	Blue Division		Red Division		White Division		BCS Division	
Season	School	Division Record	School	Division Record	School	Division Record	School	Division Record
2014	Mendon	4-0	Bridgman	4-0				
2015	Bridgman	4-0	Cassopolis	4-0	Buchanan	3-0		
2016	St. Joseph Lake Michigan Catholic	4-0	Cassopolis	4-0	Berrien Springs	3-0		
2017	St. Joseph Lake Michigan Catholic	4-0	N/A	N/A	Berrien Springs	3-0		
2018	Niles Brandywine	3-0	N/A	N/A	Berrien Springs	3-0		
2019	N/A	N/A	N/A	N/A	N/A	N/A	Berrien Springs	3-0
2020	N/A	N/A	N/A	N/A	N/A	N/A	Buchanan	4-0
2021	N/A	N/A	N/A	N/A	N/A	N/A	Berrien Springs	3-0

=== Softball ===
	Red Division		White Division		Blue Division	
Season	School	Division Record	School	Division Record	School	Division Record
2014						
2015						
2016	Bridgman	9-1				
2017						
2018			Three Oaks River Valley			
2019	Bridgman		Three Oaks River Valley			
2020						
2021	Buchanan					
2022	Buchanan	7-1				

=== Volleyball ===
	Red Division		White Division		Blue Division	
Season	School	Division Record	School	Division Record	School	Division Record
2014						
2015						
2016						
2017						
2018						
2019	Bridgman		New Buffalo			
2020						
2021	Buchanan	6-0				

== State championships ==
Schools that have participated in MHSAA state championship finals while being members of the BCS League.

Baseball
Finish	Year	School	Division
Runner-Up	2015	Buchanan	3
Runner-Up	2015	Centreville	4
Champion	2022	Buchanan	3

Boys Track & Field
Finish	Year	School	Division
Runner-Up	2018	Berrien Springs	3
Champion	2022	Berrien Springs	2

Girls Cross County
Finish	Year	School	Division
Champion	2019	Bridgman	4

Softball
Finish	Year	School	Division
Runner-Up	2015	Bronson	3
Runner-Up	2021	Buchanan	3

Volleyball
Finish	Year	School	Division
Champion	2015	Bronson	C
Champion	2016	Bronson	C
