= Brandywine Community Schools =

School district in Michigan, United States

Address
- 1830 South Third Street Niles, Berrien County, Michigan, 49120; United States

District information
- Grades: Pre-Kindergarten-12
- Superintendent: Travis Walker
- Schools: 5
- Budget: $19,488,000 2022-2023 expenditures
- NCES District ID: 2606600

Students and staff
- Students: 1,301 (2024-2025)
- Teachers: 79.85 (on an FTE basis) (2024-2025)
- Staff: 174.6 FTE (2024-2025)
- Student–teacher ratio: 16.29 (2024-2025)

Other information
- Website: www.brandywinebobcats.org

Brandywine Community Schools is a public school district in the Michiana region of Michigan. In Berrien County, it serves parts of Bertrand Township and Niles Township. In Cass County, it serves part of Milton Township.

== History ==
In 1951, the school districts of Bell, Bertrand, and Bernhardt merged to form Brandywine school district. The district's first junior high school was built on 13th Street as an elementary school in 1952 and converted to a junior high in 1956. Brandywine Middle/Senior High School opened in fall 1961 and was dedicated on December 17, 1961. High school students had previously attended Niles High School.

As on 1961, the district had four elementary schools: Bell, Bertrand, LaSalle, and Wickler. Bertrand and LaSalle were built in 1954. The district had grown from 412 students in 1951 to 2,250 in 1962.

2,600 students were in the district as of 1967, when financial problems due to inadequate revenue led to discussions of merging the district with Niles Community Schools. The district stated it may close two elementary schools and temporarily cut programs. But as of 1977, four elementary schools remained open, although enrollment had dropped to 2,094.

By 1982, Merritt Elementary on LaSalle Street was the only elementary school, and the district was facing further declining enrollment. Beginning in the 1982–1983 school year, junior high and senior high school students were housed in the high school, and the junior high school became Brandywine Elementary. Merritt Elementary closed that year but was remodeled and reopened in 1985 for various uses by the district.

Voters in the district approved bond issues in 2003 and 2007 for renovations and building additions.

== Schools ==
Schools in Brandywine Community Schools district
School	Address	Notes
Brandywine Middle/Senior High School	1700 Bell Rd., Niles	Grades 7–12. Built 1961.
Brandywine Elementary	2428 South 13th Street, Niles	Grades 3–6
Merritt Elementary	1620 Lasalle Avenue, Niles	Grades PreK-2
Brandywine Innovation Academy	1830 South 3rd Street, Niles	Alternative high school
