= Buchanan High School (Michigan) =

High school in Michigan, USA

Location
- 401 West Chicago Street; Buchanan, Michigan 49017; United States; 41°49′27″N 86°22′02″W

Information
- Type: Comprehensive public high school
- Motto: "Seize the Opportunity Inside the Challenge"
- Established: 1872
- School district: Buchanan Community Schools
- Superintendent: Patricia Robinson
- CEEB code: 230425
- NCES School ID: 260714004308
- Principal: Brian Pruett
- Teaching staff: 32.60 (on FTE basis)
- Grades: 8-12
- Enrollment: 524 (2023-2024)
- Student to teacher ratio: 16.07
- Campus size: 21 acres (8.5 ha)
- Colors: Maroon & White
- Fight song: Go You Buchanan
- Athletics conference: Lakeland Conference
- Nickname: Bucks
- Rivals: Brandywine High School
- Yearbook: The Pines
- Feeder schools: Buchanan Middle School
- Website: www.buchananschools.com/buchanan-high-school/
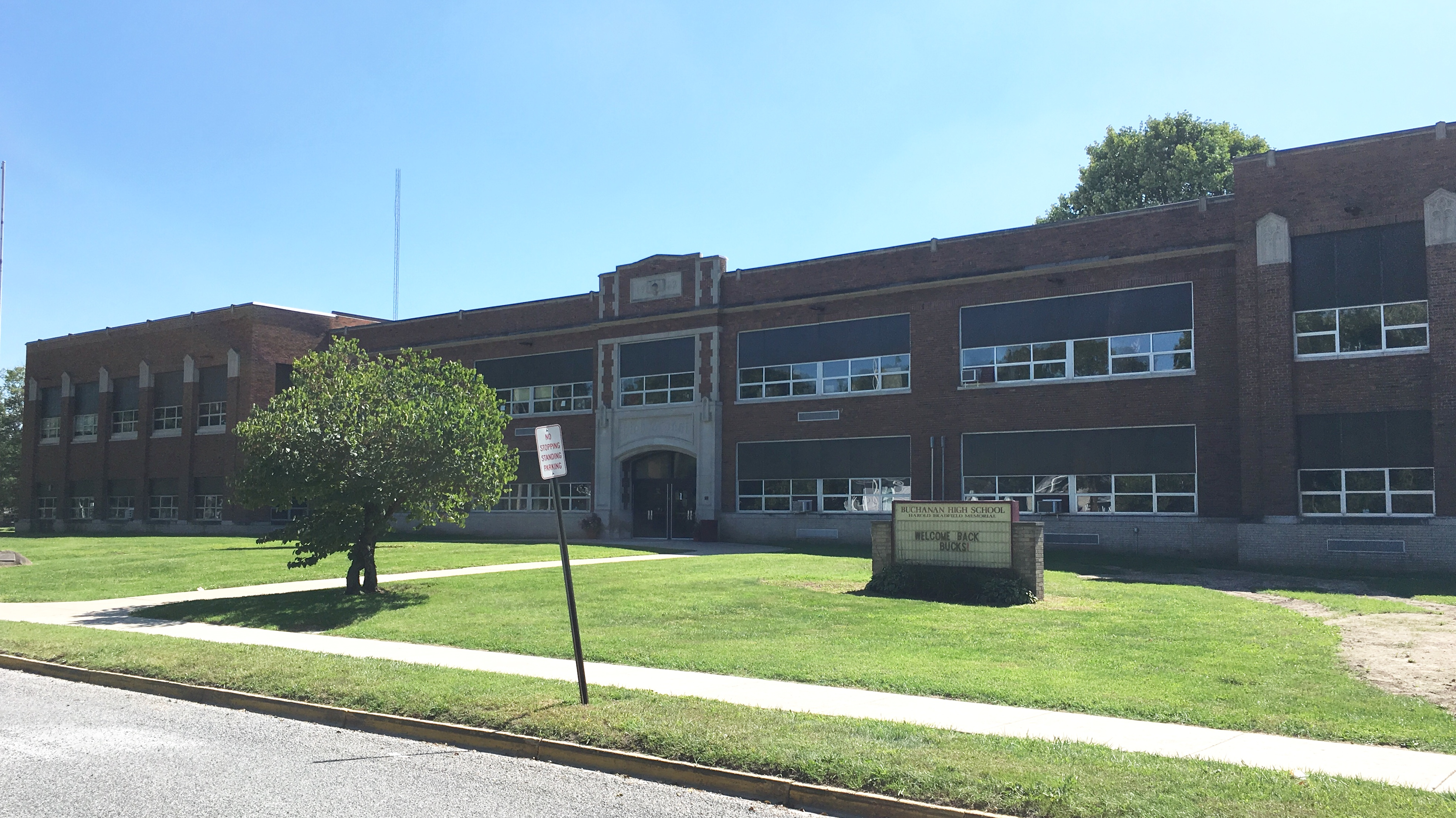
- Buchanan High School
- U.S. Historic district – Contributing property
- Location within Michigan
- Built: 1922
- Architectural style: Collegiate Gothic
- Part of: Buchanan North and West Neighborhoods Historic District (ID11000863)
- Designated CP: November 30, 2011

Buchanan High School is a comprehensive public high school located in Buchanan, Michigan, United States. The school serves grades 8-12 and is part of the Buchanan Community Schools district. The school and the community it serves is named after James Buchanan, the 15th President of the United States. Between 2012 and 2014, the school received local and national recognition for its student-led anti-bullying efforts and was named "Nicest School in America" in 2014 by Procter & Gamble as a part of its "Mean Stinks!" anti-bullying campaign. Since the class of 2017, all graduates residing within the school district are eligible for the Buchanan Promise scholarship which grants financial assistance towards the cost of attending a college, university or trade school. The amount was initially a maximum of $10,000 per graduate, but increased to a maximum of $15,000 per graduate beginning with the class of 2022.

== History ==
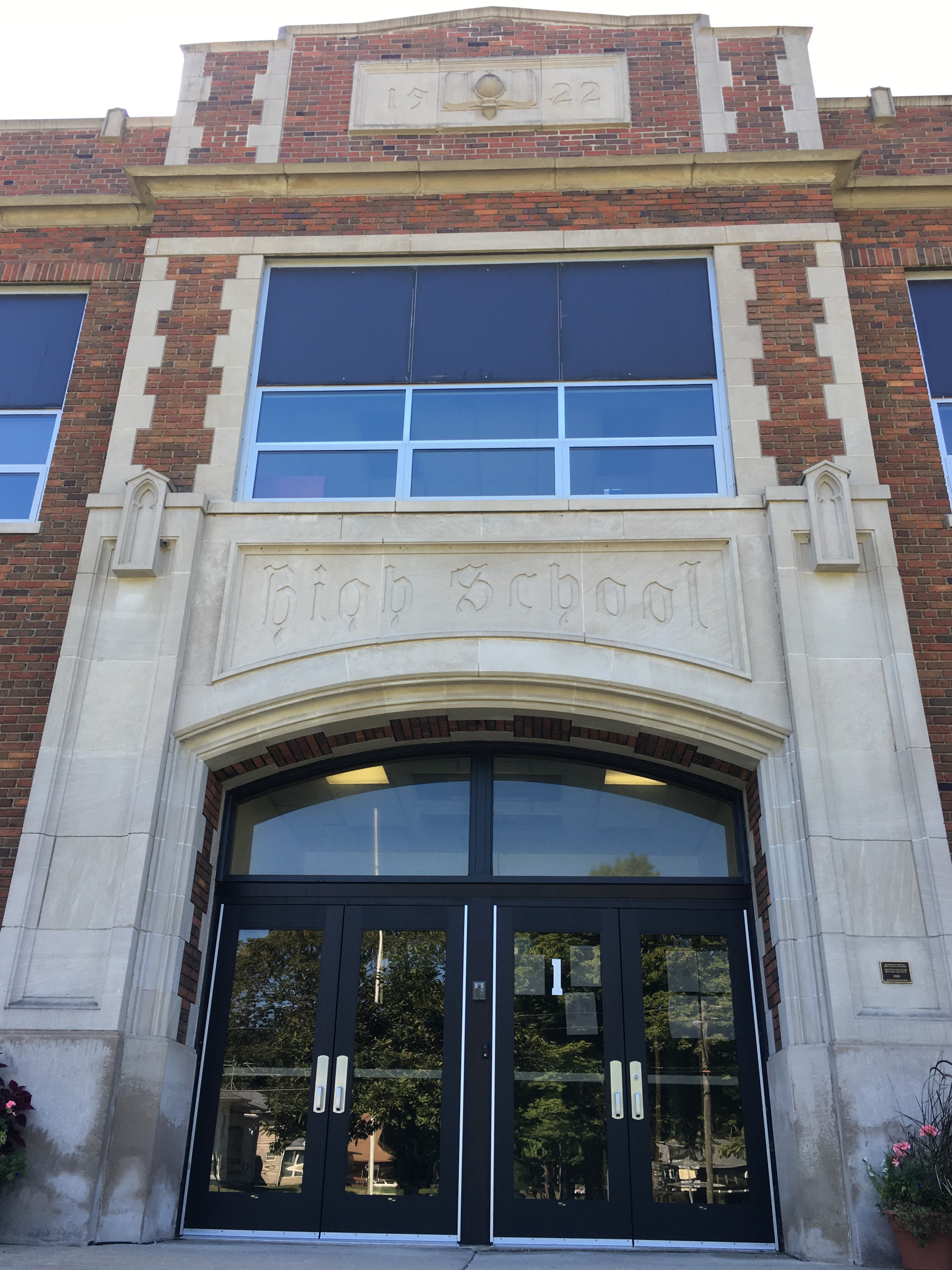
Buchanan High School Main Entrance.

The present high school was constructed in 1922 and is designed in the Collegiate Gothic style popular during that time period. It is a two-story flat-roof structure with a dark red brick facade embedded with decorative limestone accents. Additions to the original building include the science wing on the east side, the competition gym on the northwest side and the auxiliary gym on the southwest side. The school is a contributing property in the Buchanan North and West Neighborhoods Historic District. The Buchanan Union High School existed at the same site from 1872 to 1922. A portion of the original building's first story remains standing immediately north of the Ray Miller Industrial Arts Center. The tower bell from the 1872 high school is on display just outside the main entrance to the science wing.

== Demographics ==
In the 2019–2020 school year, the demographic breakdown of the 580 students enrolled, was:

- Male - 49.7%
- Female - 50.3%
- Native American/Alaskan - 0.5%
- Asian/Pacific islander - 0.7%
- Black - 3.8%
- Hispanic - 2.6%
- White - 87.1%
- Multiracial - 5.3%

== Academics ==
As of 2018-2019 school year, Buchanan offered three different high school/college dual enrollment programs in partnership with local community colleges Lake Michigan College and Southwestern Michigan College. Regular Dual Enrollment students participate in college courses at the school's expense and obtain both college and high school credit for completed courses. Early College Academy (ECA) is similar to Dual Enrollment except students attend college courses during the school day and follow a set curriculum. Attainment of an associates degree by graduation is an option by completing summer college course work. Early Middle College is similar to ECA except that both a high school diploma and associate degree can be attained over five years without summer course work. Advanced placement classes are offered online through the Michigan Virtual High School.

The school offers specialized instruction through vocational education as part of the Berrien County Career and Technical Education Program. Courses and programs of study offered include: Agriscience, Computer Network Administration, Digital Multimedia Design, Advanced Automotive, Building & Construction Trades, Cabinet & Furniture Making, Computer Assisted Design, Machine & Tool Trades, Welding & Cutting, EMT, Professional Health Careers Academy, Sports Medicine, Law Enforcement Academy, and Culinary Arts.

== Athletics ==
Buchanan is a member of the Michigan High School Athletic Association (MHSAA) and the Lakeland Conference. Past conference affiliations include the BCS League (2014-2022), Lakeland Athletic Conference (1980-2014), Blossomland Athletic Conference (1962-1979) and Southwestern Michigan Athletic Conference (1931-1961). Athletic teams compete under the nickname "Bucks" or "Lady Bucks." School colors are maroon and white. Rivals include Berrien Springs High School and Brandywine High School. The following MHSAA sanctioned sports are offered:

- Baseball (boys)
  - State championships - 1985, 2022
- Basketball (girls and boys)
  - Girls state championships - 1990
  - Boys state championships - 1976, 1978
- Competitive cheerleading (girls)
- Cross country (girls and boys)
- Football (boys)
- Golf (boys)
- Soccer (girls and boys)
- Softball (girls)
- Swim and dive (girls and boys)
- Tennis (girls and boys)
  - Boys state championships - 2003
- Track and field (girls and boys)
  - Boys state championships - 1933, 1999
- Volleyball (girls)
- Wrestling (boys)

Equestrian (girls and boys) is also offered and competes in events sanctioned by the Michigan Interscholastic Horsemanship Association.

== Notable alumni ==
- Izzi Dame (2017) - professional wrestler and former professional volleyball player
- Virgil Exner - automobile designer
- Hannah Roberts (2019) - women's Freestyle BMX World Champion & Olympic Silver Medalist
- Jay Town (1991) - United States District Attorney

== See also ==
- List of high schools in Michigan
