= Sacred Heart Academy High School (Mt. Pleasant, Michigan) =

Location
- 316 East Michigan Street; Mount Pleasant, Michigan 48858; United States; 43°36′11″N 84°46′25″W

Information
- Type: Private school
- Religious affiliation: Roman Catholic
- Established: 1889
- Founder: John Crowley
- Oversight: Diocese of Saginaw
- Principal: Mary Kay Yonker
- Teaching staff: 97.0 (on an FTE basis)
- Grades: PreK–12
- Enrollment: 425 (2023-2024)
- Student to teacher ratio: 4.3
- Colors: Red, green and white
- Fight song: Onward Irish
- Athletics conference: Mid-State Activities Conference
- Nickname: Fighting Irish
- Yearbook: Cor Jesu
- Website: academy.sha.net
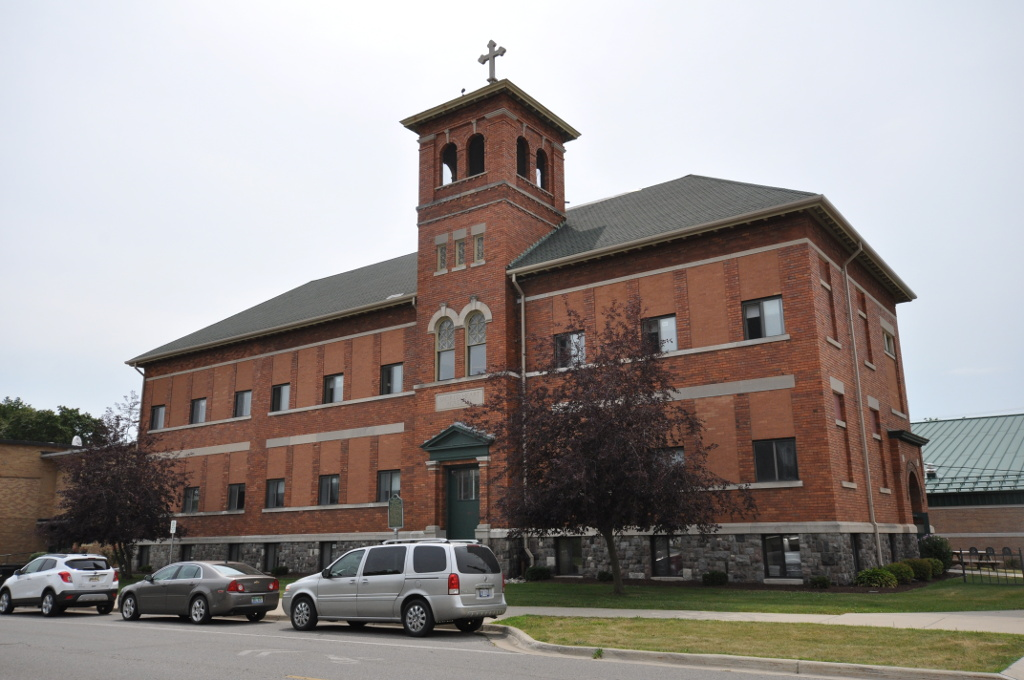
- Sacred Heart Academy High School, July 2017

Sacred Heart Academy High School is a Roman Catholic parochial school in Mount Pleasant, Michigan, United States. It is located in the Roman Catholic Diocese of Saginaw and serves grades PreK-12.

It is split between two buildings, one is for grades 7-12 and the other is for grades PreK-6. The middle/high school building has a parish hall/cafeteria, two gymnasiums/basketball courts, a band room, a science laboratory, and an art room.

== Demographics ==
The demographic breakdown of the 425 students enrolled for 2023-2024 was:

- Native American/Alaskan - 1.4%
- Asian - 3.6%
- Black - 2.7%
- Hispanic - 2.2%
- White - 85.1%
- Multiracial - 5.0%

== Athletics ==
Sacred Heart Academy's Irish compete in the Mid-State Activities Conference. School colors are red, white and green. The following Michigan High School Athletic Association (MHSAA) sanctioned sports are offered:

- Baseball (boys)
- Basketball (girls and boys)
- Cross Country (girls and boys)
- Dance (girls)
- 11-man Football (boys)
- Golf (girls and boys)
- Ice Hockey (boys)
- Soccer (girls)
- Softball (girls)
- Track and field (girls and boys)
- Volleyball (girls)

== Clubs and activity's offered ==
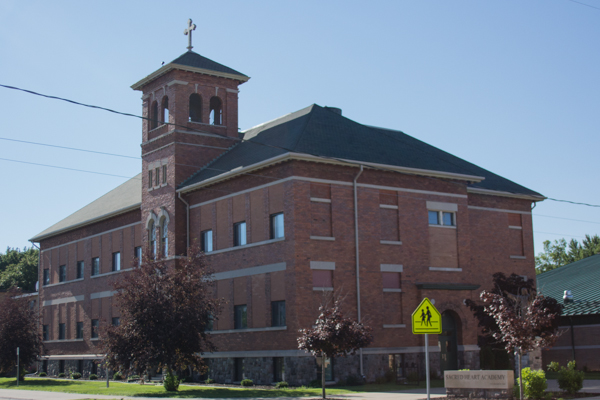
A Picture of the middle/high main building.

Sacred Heart Academy offers many Clubs and other activity's for the student these are in school and out of school.

- Choir
- Close Up
- Concert band
- Forensics
- Key club
- Language arts
- National honors society
- Quiz bowl
- Student senate
- Science Olympiad
- E-sports
