= RBH =

RBH, or rbh, may refer to:

- RBH Logistics, a subsidiary of DB Schenker
- Red Book of Hergest, a Welsh manuscript written shortly after 1382
- Rothmans, Benson & Hedges, a Canadian tobacco manufacturer
- Royal Bafokeng Holdings, the Sovereign Wealth Fund of the Royal Bafokeng Nation of South Africa
- Royal Berkshire Hospital, a general hospital in Reading, Berkshire, UK
- Royal Bolton Hospital, an acute general hospital in Farnworth, Manchester, UK
- Royal Buckinghamshire Hospital, a private hospital in Aylesbury, Buckinghamshire, UK
- Rubidium hydride (RbH), a chemical compound
- Rutherford B. Hayes (1822–1893), 19th president of the United States

== See also ==
- RBHS (disambiguation)
