= Lakeland Conference =

Sports league in the United States

- Conference: Michigan High School Athletic Association (MHSAA)
- Founded: 2022
- No. of teams: 4 Class B, 1 Class C
- Region: Southwest Michigan

The Lakeland Conference is an athletic conference for high schools in southwest Michigan in the United States. Founded in 2022 with the inaugural season of play in 2022-2023, the conference is a reboot of the old Lakeland Athletic Conference to which it shares a similar geographic footprint, school membership and historic rivalries.

== Sponsored sports ==
The league offers competition in nine boys' and eight girls' sports.

=== Boys ===
Baseball, Basketball, Cross Country, Football, Golf, Soccer, Tennis, Track and Field, Wrestling

==== Sports by school ====
School	Baseball	Basketball	Cross Country	Football	Golf	Soccer	Tennis	Track & Field	Wrestling
Benton Harbor	✓	✓	✗	✓	✗	✗	✗	✓	✓
Berrien Springs	✓	✓	✓	✓	✓	✓	✓	✓	✓
Buchanan	✓	✓	✓	✓	✓	✓	✓	✓	✓
Dowagiac	✓	✓	✓	✓	✓	✓	✓	✓	✓
Niles Brandywine	✓	✓	✓	✓	✓	✓	✓	✓	✓

=== Girls ===
Basketball, Competitive Cheerleading, Cross Country, Soccer, Softball, Tennis, Track & Field, Volleyball

==== Sports by school ====
School	Basketball	Competitive Cheer	Cross Country	Soccer	Softball	Tennis	Track & Field	Volleyball
Benton Harbor	✓	✗	✗	✗	✓	✗	✓	✓
Berrien Springs	✓	✓	✓	✓	✓	✓	✓	✓
Buchanan	✓	✓	✓	✓	✓	✓	✓	✓
Dowagiac	✓	✓	✓	✓	✓	✓	✓	✓
Niles Brandywine	✓	✗	✓	✓	✓	✓	✓	✓

== Member schools ==
There are currently five member schools. The geographic footprint of the league includes Berrien and Cass counties in Michigan.

=== Current members ===
School data in the table below is current for the 2023-24 season according to the MHSAA website.

School	Location	Mascot	Colors	Enrollment	Class	Affiliation	Joined	Previous Conference
Benton Harbor	Benton Harbor	Tigers	Orange & Black	528	B	Public	2022	Independent
Berrien Springs	Berrien Springs	Shamrocks	Green & White	554	B	Public	2022	BCS League
Buchanan	Buchanan	Bucks	Maroon & White	398	B	Public	2022	BCS League
Niles Brandywine	Niles Township	Bobcats	Maroon & Gold	348	C	Public	2022	BCS League
Dowagiac	Dowagiac	Chieftains	Orange & Black	517	B	Public	2022	Wolverine Conference

=== Former members ===
School	Location	Joined	Previous Conference	Departed	Successive Conference
n/a	n/a	n/a	n/a	n/a	n/a

== Conference championships ==
=== Baseball ===
Season	School	Conference Record
2023		

=== Boys Basketball ===
Season	School	Conference Record
2023	Benton Harbor	22-2

=== Girls Basketball ===
Season	School	Conference Record
2023	Buchanan	8-0

=== Boys Cross Country ===
Season	School	Conference Record
2022	Berrien Springs	4-0

=== Girls Cross Country ===
Season	School	Conference Record
2022	Buchanan	4-0

=== Football ===
Season	School	Conference Record
2022	Buchanan	4-0

=== Boys Soccer ===
Season	School	Conference Record
2022	Dowagiac	3-0

=== Girls Soccer ===
Season	School	Conference Record
2023	Berrien Springs	4-0

=== Softball ===
Season	School	Conference Record
2023	Buchanan	8-0

=== Volleyball ===
Season	School	Conference Record
2022	Buchanan	4-0

=== Wrestling ===
Season	School	Conference Record
2023	Niles Brandywine	5-0

== State championships ==
Schools that have participated in MHSAA state championship finals while being members of the Lakeland Conference.

TBD
Finish	Year	School	Division
n/a	n/a	n/a	n/a
