= Detroit Mercy Titans track and field =

Men's and women's track and field team

Detroit Titans track and field
- University: University of Detroit Mercy
- Head coach: Guy Murray (25th season)
- Conference: Horizon League
- Location: Detroit, Michigan, US
- Outdoor track: Titan Field
- Nickname: Detroit Titans
- Colors: Red, white, and blue

Conference Indoor Championships
- Men's: 1996, 2000; Women's: 1996, 1998, 1999, 2002

Conference Outdoor Championships
- Men's: 2003; Women's: 1999, 2000; Men's Cross Country: 2013, 2014; Women's Cross Country: 1986, 1987

The Detroit Titans track and field team is men's and women's track and field team that represents the University of Detroit Mercy in the NCAA Division I and competes in the Horizon League. The team is coached by head coach Guy Murray and assistant coaches Rondell Ruff and Curtis Bell.

== Top 10 List ==
- Updated to end of 2026 outdoor track and field season.

=== 60 Meter Dash ===
Men's 60 Meter Dash

Rank	Name	Time	Year
1	Dante Bassham	6.66	2023
2	Eilijah Major	6.77	2022
3	Earnest Cleary	6.83	2010
4	James Wallace	6.84	2024
5	Vushaun Landrum	6.85	2011
6	Bonanza Cummings	6.89	2019
7	Earle Lloyd	6.91	1984
8	Charles Anthony	6.92	2013
9	Brandon Wilks	6.94	2014
T10	Nick Johnson	6.98	2024
T10	David Keel	6.98	2025

Women's 60 Meter Dash

Rank	Name	Time	Year
1	Imani Sharp	7.61	2026
2	Shireese Statin	7.65	1998
3	Kyri Jackson	7.67	2020
T4	Allison Garner	7.68	2015
T4	Meghan Koss	7.68	2025
T6	Nicole Meisner	7.75	2013
T6	Mone Knowles	7.75	2022
T8	Zanita Clipper	7.77	2006
T8	Tiffany James	7.77	2007
10	Alexandra Carnathan	7.80	2019

=== 100 Meter Dash ===
Men's 100 Meter Dash

Rank	Name	Time	Year
1	Dante Bassham	10.39	2022
T2	Eilijah Major	10.53	2023
T2	James Wallace	10.53	2025
4	Bonanza Cummings	10.60	2021
5	Vushaun Landrum	10.63	2011
6	Earnest Cleary	10.66	2009
T7	Charles Anthony	10.70	2014
T7	Brandon Wilks	10.70	2014
9	Micah Chaney	10.82	2026
10	Nick Johnson	10.83	2025

Women's 100 Meter Dash

Rank	Name	Time	Year
1	Mone Knowles	11.85	2022
2	Shireese Statin	11.89	2000
3	Imani Sharp	11.99	2026
4	Meghan Koss	12.01	2025
5	Tiffany James	12.04	2007
6	Alexandra Carnathan	12.06	2019
7	Nicole Meisner	12.07	2012
8	Nikia Duncan	12.08	2012
9	Allison Garner	12.13	2015
10	Kyri Jackson	12.15	2021

=== 200 Meter Dash ===
Men's 200 Meter Dash

Rank	Name	Time	Year
1	Lesley Hanna	21.07	2011
2	Eilijah Major	21.12	2023
3	Dante Bassham	21.33	2022
4	Wally Gruber	21.6y	1948
5	Charles Anthony	21.65	2013
6	Vushaun Landrum	21.74	2010
7	Micah Chaney	21.77	2026
T8	Eric McKeon	21.80	1998
T8	James Wallace	21.80	2025
10	Jay McKenzie	21.90	2024

Women's 200 Meter Dash

Rank	Name	Time	Year
1	Mone Knowles	24.13	2022
2	Meghan Koss	24.70	2025
3	Kyri Jackson	24.81i	2020
4	Shireese Statin	24.82	2000
5	Allison Garner	25.01	2015
6	Alexandra Carnathan	25.06	2019
7	Zanita Clipper	25.07i	2006
8	Nicole Meisner	25.08	2012
T9	Brandee Hart	25.09	2011
T9	McKenzie McNitt	25.09	2025

=== 400 Meter Dash ===
Men's 400 Meter Dash

Rank	Name	Time	Year
1	Lesley Hanna	46.72	2011
2	Khalil Parris	47.19	2016
3	Eric McKeon	47.31	1998
4	Jay McKenzie	47.42	2026
5	Jack Szczepaniuk	47.84i	2001
6	Mark Risch	48.12	1998
7	Wally Gruber	48.4y	1948
8	Carlton Sims	48.60	2016
9	Joseph Raffin	48.63	2014
10	Luke Adamczyk	48.76	2023

Women's 400 Meter Dash

Rank	Name	Time	Year
1	Sequoyia Calhoun	54.93	2011
2	McKenzie McNitt	55.61	2025
3	Kye Dozier	56.34	2016
4	Alani Letang	56.48	2014
5	Abigail Winkle	56.70	2026
6	Shannon Marchant	57.15i	2014
7	Jasmine Greene	57.16i	2013
8	Kayla Wize	57.17	2025
9	Nicole Callaway	57.2	1997
10	Megan Miller	57.8	2008

=== 800 Meter Run ===
Men's 800 Meter Run

Rank	Name	Time	Year
1	Jack Szczepaniuk	1:49.77	2004
2	Corey Stedman	1:51.56	1999
3	Marcus Davis	1:52.62	2006
4	Jaymi Dumper	1:52.72	2001
5	Matt Mahler	1:52.81i	2011
6	Joshua Carolin	1:53.40i	2014
7	Chris Smalley	1:53.43	2013
8	Dash Dobar	1:54.06	2019
9	Josh Otten	1:54.17	2024
T10	Alex Gould	1:54.36i	2010
T10	Anton Webster	1:54.36i	2017

Women's 800 Meter Run

Rank	Name	Time	Year
1	Ruthie Cook	2:10.37	2001
2	Sydnie Fetherolf	2:10:41	2018
3	Shannon Marchant	2:13.26	2014
4	Andrea Karl	2:13.80	2005
5	Josie Arnold	2:14.55	2022
6	Kirstin Mooney	2:14.81i	2011
7	Samantha Zakalowski	2:15.65i	2014
8	Ciara Curley-Poppe	2:16.33	2013
9	Bonnie Fitzpatrick	2:16.60	1988
10	Athalee Norman	2:16.84i	1990

=== 1500 Meter Run ===
Men's 1500 Meter Run

Rank	Name	Time	Year
1	Josh Otten	3:47.85	2026
2	Corey Stedman	3:50.98	1999
3	Guy Murray	3:52.21	1989
4	Patrick Liederbach	3:52.80	2010
5	Colin Murray	3:53.76	2026
6	Matt Mahler	3:54.16	2011
7	Alex Gould	3:54.74	2010
8	Dan Zinser	3:55.39	2006
9	Ryan Hofsess	3:56.10	2016
10	Bob Radlich	3:56.33	2013

Women's 1500 Meter Run

Rank	Name	Time	Year
1	Andrea Karl	4:28.87	2006
2	Louisa Coppola	4:28.91	2014
3	Ruthie Cook	4:31.36	2002
4	Sydnie Fetherolf	4:32.46	2018
5	Kim Hemstreet	4:33.60	2002
6	Athalee Norman	4:35.75	1990
7	Nina Pizzo	4:36.99	2026
8	Josie Arnold	4:38.00	2023
9	Angie Lefere	4:41.14	1998
10	Bonnie Fitzpatrick	4:42.52	1988

=== Mile Run ===
Men's Mile Run

Rank	Name	Time	Year
1	Patrick Liederbach	4:09.64i	2011
2	Corey Stedman	4:10.3i	1998
3	Josh Otten	4:11.49i	2026
4	Ben Kendell	4:11.80i	2018
5	Alex Gould	4:11.85i	2010
6	Colin Murray	4:11.97i	2026
7	Guy Murray	4:12.99i	1989
8	James McCann	4:13.48i	2020
9	Dan Zinser	4:14.37i	2006
10	Thomas Mueller	4:15.70i	2020

Women's Mile Run

Rank	Name	Time	Year
1	Andrea Karl	4:51.31i	2006
2	Ruthie Cook	4:51.81i	2002
3	Sydnie Fetherolf	4:54.75i	2018
4	Louisa Coppola	4:55.12i	2014
5	Athalee Norman	4:56.45i	1990
6	Kim Hemstreet	4:58.02i	2003
7	Allison Sherman	5:04.64i	2024
8	Bonnie Fitzpatrick	5:06.4i	1988
9	Angie Lefere	5:07.46i	2000
10	Rebecca Arnold	5:08.73	2022

=== 3000 Meter Run ===
Men's 3000 Meter Run

Rank	Name	Time	Year
1	Ben Kendell	8:17.21i	2018
2	James McCann	8:20.74i	2020
3	Colin Murray	8:21.57i	2026
4	Patrick Liederbach	8:22.47i	2009
5	Ryan Leahy	8:26.63i	2015
6	Thomas Mueller	8:29.62i	2022
7	Mead Goedert	8:30.06i	2006
8	Guy Murray	8:30.1i	1989
9	Josh Otten	8:30.48i	2025
10	Chris McPhee	8:31.54i	2001

Women's 3000 Meter Run

Rank	Name	Time	Year
1	Kim Hemstreet	9:47.13i	2003
2	Allison Sherman	9:51.51i	2024
3	Louisa Coppola	9:56.11i	2014
4	Ruthie Cook	10:08.13i	2002
5	Nancy Mandziara	10:10.4i	1988
6	Angie Lefere	10:13.02i	2000
7	Athalee Norman	10:14.25	1990
8	Devon Sutton	10:16.64i	2017
9	Andrea Karl	10:16.94i	2006
10	Michelle Vogt	10:18.9i	1988

=== 5000 Meter Run ===
Men's 5000 Meter Run

Rank	Name	Time	Year
1	Ben Kendell	14:07.43i	2018
2	Colin Murray	14:20.28	2026
3	Patrick Liederbach	14:32.85	2009
4	Josh Otten	14:39.89	2026
5	James McCann	14:40.83i	2020
6	Chris McPhee	14:42.11i	2000
7	Christopher Russelburg	14:44.05	2026
8	Mead Goedert	14:46.00i	2006
9	Thomas Mueller	14:48.19	2022
10	Guy Murray	14:49.06i	1989

Women's 5000 Meter Run

Rank	Name	Time	Year
1	Allison Sherman	16:47.58i	2024
2	Kim Hemstreet	16:48.03	2002
3	Louisa Coppola	16:49.88	2014
4	Nina Pizzo	17:32.24	2026
5	Claire Kendell	17:33.39	2019
6	Evie Wright	17:38.74	2025
7	Nancy Mandziara	17:39.6i	1988
8	Jessica Clayson	17:41.99	2003
9	Rebecca Arnold	17:47.50	2022
10	Devon Sutton	17:47.60i	2017

=== 10000 Meter Run ===
Men's 10000 Meter Run

Rank	Name	Time	Year
1	Ben Kendell	29:00.15	2019
2	Christopher Russelburg	30:30.11	2024
3	Chris McPhee	30:33.13	2000
4	Ryan Belanger	30:34.64	2026
5	James McCann	30:38.47	2019
6	Martin Nelkie	30:50.55	2014
7	Alex Harris	30:55.26	2012
8	Mead Goedert	31:15.00	2005
9	Ryan Leahy	31:32.91	2014
10	James Furkis	31:33.2	1998

Women's 10000 Meter Run

Rank	Name	Time	Year
1	Allison Sherman	35:07.45	2024
2	Kim Hemstreet	35:25.41	2002
3	Evie Wright	36:20.72	2025
4	Claire Kendell	36:45.80	2018
5	Devon Sutton	37:09.80	2017
6	Louisa Coppola	37:18.09	2015
7	Angie Lefere	37:20.42	2001
8	Claire Hunt	37:20.72	2026
9	Carrie Vanisacker	37:43.89	1995
10	Nancy Mandziara	37:50.03	1988

=== 60 Meter Hurdles ===
Men's 60 Meter Hurdles

Rank	Name	Time	Year
1	Ken Riley	8.17	1996
2	Angelo Finnie	8.18	2003
3	Ilia Panev	8.19	2014
4	Earle Lloyd	8.21	1985
5	Steven Ivanics	8.24	2013
T6	Aviram Campbell	8.30	2012
T6	Angelo Finnie Jr.	8.30	2026
8	Payton Norkey	8.31	2022
9	Tom Grant	8.36	2005
T10	Maurice Wilson	8.38	1995
T10	Vincent Lefler	8.38	2012

Women's 60 Meter Hurdles

Rank	Name	Time	Year
1	Kyri Jackson	8.61	2020
2	Jennifer Frierson	8.78	2005
3	Aisha Potts-Tyre	8.84	2016
4	Brandee Hart	8.89	2014
5	Kelly Bernath	9.04	2002
6	Haley Lipscomb	9.08	2026
7	Alexa Krauth	9.10	2024
8	Gabriela Gashaj	9.12	2026
9	Rita Harden	9.15	1992
10	Nia Cooper	9.29	2004

=== 100/110 Meter Hurdles ===
Men's 110 Meter Hurdles

Rank	Name	Time	Year
1	Payton Norkey	14.48	2023
2	Steven Ivanics	14.62	2013
3	Tom Grant	14.66	2004
4	Aviram Campbell	14.67	2011
T5	Jamell Humphrey	14.74c	1992
T5	Angelo Finnie	14.74	2003
T5	Isaiah Fox	14.74	2026
8	Ken Riley	14.76	1996
9	Ilia Panev	14.84	2014
10	Vincent Lefler	14.85	2012

Women's 100 Meter Hurdles

Rank	Name	Time	Year
1	Kyri Jackson	14.15	2021
2	Brandee Hart	14.25	2012
3	Kelly Bernath	14.31	2002
4	Aisha Potts-Tyre	14.34	2015
5	Haley Lipscomb	14.76	2025
6	Alexa Krauth	14.83	2024
7	Jennifer Frierson	14.89	2003
T8	Gabriela Gashaj	15.06	2025
T8	Nadia Hill	15.06	2026
10	Rita Harden	15.08	1992

=== 400 Meter Hurdles ===
Men's 400 Meter Hurdles

Rank	Name	Time	Year
1	Khalil Parris	51.02	2015
2	Mark Risch	51.25	1998
3	Ryan Byrne	52.27	2008
4	Jeff Robertson	52.90	1996
5	Payton Norkey	53.14	2023
6	Eric Christy	53.44	2006
7	Vince Lefler	53.65	2011
8	Aviram Campbell	54.32	2011
9	Anthony Donald	54.48	2011
10	Ilia Panev	54.58	2014

Women's 400 Meter Hurdles

Rank	Name	Time	Year
1	Jasmine Greene	1:01.18	2014
2	Gabriela Gashaj	1:02.71	2025
3	Kelly Bernath	1:02.94	2001
4	Amy Garbacz	1:03.16	2000
5	Wendy Petz	1:03.3	1995
6	Amanda Smith	1:03.87	2005
7	Gracelyn Peebles	1:04.24	2024
8	Ruthie Cook	1:04.51	2002
9	Kirstin Mooney	1:05.10	2011
10	Olivia Smid	1:05.20	2010

=== 3000 Meter Steeplechase ===
Men's 3000 Meter Steeplechase

Rank	Name	Time	Year
1	John Burke	9:19.76	2023
2	Sinisa Simic	9:32.29	2005
3	Adam Fraeyman	9:35.33	2019
4	Derek Gielarowski	9:36.92	2016
5	George Holman	9:42.72	2013
6	Guy Murray	9:43.8	1988
7	Chris McPhee	9:46.31	1998
8	Jeff Keith	9:46.41	1997
9	Kevin Smalley	9:48.61	2010
10	Sam Felton	9:50.13	2014

Women's 3000 Meter Steeplechase

Rank	Name	Time	Year
1	Rebecca Measel	11:03.10	2021
2	Rebecca Arnold	11:04.97	2022
3	Ruthie Cook	11:10.0	2001
4	Veronica Towianski	11:14.74	2019
5	LeAnn Sarka	11:17.35	2006
6	Zeinab Baydoun	11:18.07	2014
7	Alaina Burns	11:24.55	2026
8	Angie Lefere	11:25.29	2001
9	Katrina Oberski	11:33.59	2012
10	Kim Hemstreet	11:36.3	2001

=== 4x100 Meter Relay ===
Men's 4x100 Meter Relay

Rank	Name	Time	Year
1	Eding, Major, Bassham, Talley	41.00	2023
2	Cummings, Bassham, Major, Eding	41.05	2022
3	Cummings, Bassham, Major, Walker	41.16	2022
4	Landrum, Hanna, Anthony, Cleary	41.45	2011
5	Chaney, DeCasas, Almeda, McKenzie	41.55	2026
6	Bassham, Cummings, Walker, Hilsenbeck	41.63	2021
T7	Ivanics, Wilks, Parris, Anthony	41.80	2014
T7	Panev, Sims, Arnold, Wilks	41.80	2016
9	Osayande, Landrum, Jones, Cleary	41.88	2010
10	Johnson, Wallace, McKenzie, Almeda	41.90	2025

Women's 4x100 Meter Relay

Rank	Name	Time	Year
1	Edwards, Garbacz, Leftwich, Statin	46.90	2000
2	Bernath, Edwards, Grandas, Statin	47.23	2001
3	Favors, Knowles, Carey, Krauth	47.43	2023
4	Velazquez, Koss, McNitt, Wize	47.45	2025
5	Dent, Greene, Hart, Garner	47.48	2014
6	Carnathan, Vizard, Dent, Garner	47.49	2016
7	Dent, Holmes, Hamilton, Garner	47.57	2015
8	Duncan, Calhoun, Hart, Meisner	47.69	2011
9	Carnathan, Hamilton, Vizard, Garner	47.72	2016
10	Carnathan, Jackson, Holmes, Hamilton	47.73	2017

=== 4x400 Meter Relay ===
Men's 4x400 Meter Relay

Rank	Name	Time	Year
1	McKeon, Risch, Hynous, Robertson	3:13.57	1994
2	McKeon, Stedman, Risch, Robertson	3:13.84	1996
3	Kafer, Davis, Christy, Byrne	3:14.85	2005
T4	Webster, Sims, Wilks, Parris	3:15.02i	2016
T4	Arnold, Sims, Webster, Parris	3:15.02	2016
6	Talley, Hansen, McKenzie, Ferguson	3:15.03	2026
7	Webster, Arnold, Sims, Parris	3:15.11	2016
8	McKeon, Imber, Risch, Robertson	3:15.29	1996
9	McKeon, Imber, Stedman, Risch	3:15.44i	1998
10	Raffin, Lefler, Mahler, Hanna	3:15.58i	2011

Women's 4x400 Meter Relay

Rank	Name	Time	Year
1	Vizard, Dent, Mullen, Dozier	3:49.88	2016
2	Wize, Seaton, Williams, Winkle	3:49.93	2026
3	Hart, Letang, Marchant, Greene	3:50.73i	2014
4	Dent, Vizard, Mullen, Dozier	3:50.86	2016
5	Calhoun, Miller, Thomas, James	3:51.33	2009
6	Hart, Duncan, Hunt, Letang	3:51.73	2013
7	Hart, Rogers, Marchant, Greene	3:51.95i	2014
8	Hart, Marchant, Greene, Rogers	3:51.98	2014
9	Hart, Meisner, Mooney, Calhoun	3:52.40	2011
10	Dozier, Dent, Mullen, Vizard	3:52.77i	2016

=== Distance Medley Relay ===
Men's Distance Medley Relay

Rank	Name	Time	Year
1	Mahler, Raffin, Smalley, Liederbach	9:57.48i	2011
2	Gould, Hanna, Mahler, Liederbach	9:58.09	2010
3	Jacobs, Risch, Dumper, Stedman	9:59.70i	1998
4	Felton, Sims, Webster, Kendell	10:01.60i	2017
5	Jacobs, Risch, McKeon, Stedman	10:02.03	1998
6	Hofsess, Parris, Carolin, Wigent	10:07.24i	2014
7	Keith, Imber, Selletine, Stedman	10:07.65i	1997
8	Felton, Arnold, Rogowski, Hofsess	10:08.56i	2016
9	Mahler, LaRocca, Gould, Hayner	10:09.50i	2008
10	Stedman, Risch, McKeon, Jacobs	10:09.56	1996

Women's Distance Medley Relay

Rank	Name	Time	Year
1	Taylor, Letang, Marchant, Coppola	11:51.23i	2014
2	Taylor, Mullen, Fetherolf, Coppola	11:59.87i	2015
3	Hemstreet, Edwards, Yagelski, Cook	12:12.3	2001
4	Hunt, McNitt, Figueroa, Pizza	12:17.73i	2025
5	Coppola, Greene, Marchant, Sutton	12:19.48i	2014
6	Hunt, Wize, Figueroa, Lopez	12:23.03i	2026
7	Coppola, Letang, Marchant, Baydoun	12:24.77i	2015
8	Fetherolf, Vizard, Mullen, Smith	12:28.19i	2017
9	Curley-Poppe, Greene, Taylor, Martinez	12:28.21i	2013
10	Richter, Garbacz, Cook, Hutchins	12:28.3i	1999

=== High Jump ===
Men's High Jump

Rank	Name	Mark		Year
1	Paul Caraballo	7' 3"	2.21m	1997
2	Daniel Lanfear	6' 10¼"	2.09m	2022
3	Angelo Finnie	6' 8"	2.03m	2003
4	Cody Bartlett	6' 7½"i	2.02m	2024
5	Deon Robertson	6' 7"	2.01m	2026
T6	Lesley Hanna	6' 6¼"	1.99m	2009
T6	Justin Peguese	6' 6¼"	1.99m	2012
8	Canonchet Neves	6' 6"	1.98m	1991
9	Kevin O'Callaghan	6' 5"i	1.96m	1995
10	Joseph Lietzow	6' 4¼"	1.94m	2021

Women's High Jump

Rank	Name	Mark		Year
1	Kim Jess	5' 10½"i	1.79m	1995
2	Nadia Hill	5' 8¾"i	1.75m	2026
3	Emily Paden	5' 7¼"	1.71m	2003
T4	Rochelle Stansberry	5' 5¾"i	1.67m	1997
T4	Zoe Morris	5' 5¾"i	1.67m	2024
T6	Chantel Henry	5' 4¼"i	1.63m	2007
T6	Ashley Miller	5' 4¼"	1.63m	2018
8	Rebecca Willey	5' 4"	1.62m	1992
T9	Michelle Moskal	5' 3¾"i	1.62m	1999
T9	Lori Wild	5' 3¾"	1.62m	2002

=== Pole Vault ===
Men's Pole Vault

Rank	Name	Mark		Year
1	Jacob Spiaser	14' 5½"i	4.40m	2020
2	Logan Collins	13' 11¼"i	4.25m	2020
T3	Ramy Sulaiman	13' 1½"	4.00m	2005
T3	Simon Jones	13' 1½"	4.00m	2022
5	Bernard Archer	13' 0"i	3.96m	1947
T6	Dick Anderson	12' 6"	3.81m	1958
T6	Dayton Munce	12' 6"i	3.81m	2017
8	Steve Pawlowski	12' 5½"	3.79m	2004
9	Robert Mroski	12' 4"	3.76m	1961
10	Adam DePelsmaeker	12' 3½"	3.75m	2019

Women's Pole Vault

Rank	Name	Mark		Year
1	Alexandra Sinani	11' 6½"	3.52m	2020
T2	Jane Peterman	10' 11¾"i	3.35m	2002
T2	Nicole Gillikin	10' 11¾"	3.35m	2007
T2	Abigail Ressler	10' 11¾"	3.35m	2025
5	Tiffany Satterfield	10' 8"i	3.25m	2001
6	Laura Nowicki	10' 6"	3.20m	2007
7	Kendal Waligorski	10' 2¾"i	3.12m	2026
8	Cheri Christiansen	10' 0"	3.05m	2006
9	Kayla Zauner	9' 10¾"i	3.02m	2012
10	Monica Betker	9' 8"	2.95m	2010

=== Long Jump ===
Men's Long Jump

Rank	Name	Mark		Year
1	Joey DeCasas	24' 10½"i	7.58m	2026
2	Angelo Finnie	24' 7"i	7.49m	2003
3	Dan Watkins	24' 4½"	7.42m	1959
4	Ja'Quan Patterson	23' 6¼"i	7.17m	2013
5	Isaiah Fox	23' 5¼"	7.14m	2026
6	Tom Grant	23' 4"i	7.11m	2006
7	Nikolas Henson	23' 1¾"i	7.05m	2026
8	Zachary Zaborney	22' 9"	6.93m	2023
9	Vushaun Landrum	22' 8½"	6.92m	2010
10	Paul Caraballo	22' 6½"i	6.87m	1995

Women's Long Jump

Rank	Name	Mark		Year
1	Micah Carey	19' 3¼"i	5.87m	2023
2	Rita Harden	18' 11"i	5.76m	1995
3	Angela Edwards	18' 10½"	5.75m	2001
4	Joanna Grandas	18' 10"i	5.74m	2002
5	Kyri Jackson	18' 9¼"i	5.72m	2020
6	Zoe Madden	18' 5¾"	5.63m	2022
7	Aisha Potts-Tyre	17' 11¾"i	5.48m	2015
8	Jolene Bickle	17' 11½"	5.47m	1996
T9	Ketura Kulberg	17' 11"	5.46m	1992
T9	Lynda Brundige	17' 11"i	5.46m	2017

=== Triple Jump ===
Men's Triple Jump

Rank	Name	Mark		Year
1	Angelo Finnie	50' 4½"	15.35m	2003
2	Ja'Quan Patterson	47' 7¼"	14.51m	2013
3	Paul Caraballo	46' 11"	14.30m	1995
4	Derrick Ball	45' 4½"	13.83m	2022
5	Aquari Walker	45' 2¼"i	13.77m	2021
6	Floyd Hoskin	45' 1½"i	13.75m	2011
7	Evan Eding	44' 9¾"i	13.66m	2024
8	Zachary Zaborney	44' 9½"	13.65m	2022
9	Nickolas Henson	44' 8¾"	13.63m	2026
10	Ken Riley	44' 5½"i	13.55m	1996

Women's Triple Jump

Rank	Name	Mark		Year
1	Joanna Grandas	40' 4¼"	12.30m	2005
2	Whitney Rogers	40' 1½"	12.23m	2014
3	Lynda Brundige	38' 6"i	11.73m	2017
4	Abigail Mullings	38' 1½"	11.62m	2026
5	Susan Kalkstein	37' 9½"	11.52m	2010
6	Michelle Moskal	37' 3¾"i	11.37m	1999
7	Micah Carey	36' 10¼"i	11.23m	2020
8	Angela Edwards	36' 9"	11.20m	2001
9	Aisha Potts-Tyre	36' 8½"	11.19m	2015
10	Kayla Zauner	36' 4¾"	11.09m	2013

=== Shot Put ===
Men's Shot Put

Rank	Name	Mark		Year
1	Matt Groh	57' 3½"	17.46m	2003
2	Jay Jubenville	52' 1¼"i	15.88m	2000
3	Bryan Grider	50' 9½"i	15.48m	2002
4	Jeff Sherman	50' 7¼"	15.42m	2014
5	Adam Mayhew	50' 6¼"	15.40m	2008
6	Nick Scalzi	50' 0"i	15.24m	2017
7	Hady Rahman	48' 7½"	14.82m	2005
8	Shawn Andersen	48' 0¾"i	14.64m	2000
9	Mike DeMattia	47' 7½"	14.51m	1950
10	Eric Lewis	47' 0¾"i	14.34m	2012

Women's Shot Put

Rank	Name	Mark		Year
1	Lyla Mullins	50' 7¼"	15.42m	2026
2	Ashley Bauman	45' 3"i	13.79m	2005
3	Angela Machaj	45' 1½"i	13.75m	2003
4	Altramese Roberts	44' 10¾"i	13.65m	1999
5	Ashley Bayles	44' 7½"i	13.60m	2014
6	Brittany Horne	44' 7"	13.59m	2009
7	Val Turner	43' 11¾"i	13.40m	2008
8	Andrea Karpala	43' 9¾"	13.35m	2003
9	Sheena Taylor	42' 0½"i	12.81m	2008
10	Danielle Poulin	41' 10¾"	12.76m	2009

=== Discus ===
Men's Discus

Rank	Name	Mark		Year
1	Matt Groh	181' 1"	55.19m	2003
2	Bryan Grider	177' 0"	53.94m	2003
3	Larry Grezak	161' 3"	49.14m	1997
4	Adam Mayhew	159' 10"	48.72m	2008
5	Brian Richotte	153' 4"	46.73m	2003
6	Guy Diakow	153' 1"	46.65m	2003
7	Len Flatley	153' 0"	46.63m	1963
8	Dave Elenich	149' 4"	45.51m	1997
9	Anthony Yip	149' 1"	45.44m	2025
10	Jay Jubenville	148' 7"	45.28m	1999

Women's Discus

Rank	Name	Mark		Year
1	Altramese Roberts	159' 4"	48.56m	2000
2	Angela Machaj	151' 1"	46.05m	2003
3	Ashley Bayles	145' 8"	44.41m	2015
4	Brittany Horne	144' 6"	44.04m	2010
5	Wendy Gean	140' 5"	42.79m	1999
6	Crystal Thorne	138' 3"	42.13m	1995
7	Allyson Koglin	137' 7"	41.94m	2014
8	Kayla Smith	137' 7"	41.93m	2024
9	Danielle Poulin	136' 5"	41.58m	2009
10	Tiffany Satterfield	135' 2"	41.19m	1999

=== Hammer Throw ===
Men's Hammer Throw

Rank	Name	Mark		Year
1	Colin Cashner	224' 7"	68.45m	2016
2	Eric Lewis	204' 8"	62.38m	2014
3	Matt Groh	190' 0"	57.91m	2003
4	Eric Leduc	181' 1"	55.20m	2019
5	Guy Diakow	176' 6"	53.79m	2003
6	Adam Mayhew	175' 5"	53.48m	2008
7	Bryan Grider	167' 11"	51.18m	2002
8	Melvin Cross	164' 5"	50.11m	2006
9	Larry Grezak	163' 5"	49.80m	1997
10	Brian Richotte	156' 4"	47.65m	2003

Women's Hammer Throw

Rank	Name	Mark		Year
1	Brittany Horne	201' 1"	61.30m	2010
2	Andrea Karpala	177' 9"	54.17m	2005
3	Kayla Smith	177' 6"	54.11m	2024
4	Angela Machaj	173' 5"	52.85m	2005
5	Tiffany Satterfield	171' 8"	52.32m	2001
6	Brynne Gustafson	170' 9"	52.05m	2019
7	Allyson Koglin	169' 6"	51.67m	2014
8	Jocelyn Trapani	167' 5"	51.02m	2000
9	Ashley Bauman	163' 11"	49.96m	2005
10	Wendy Gean	162' 6"	49.53m	1999

=== Javelin ===
Men's Javelin

Rank	Name	Mark		Year
1	John Paul Terzano	171' 7"	52.31m	2022
2	Joseph Lietzow	167' 8"	51.11m	2021
3	Jeff Masserang	162' 1"	49.40m	2003
4	Luke Adamczyk	159' 1"	48.48m	2025
5	Simon Jones	158' 5"	48.30m	2023
6	Brian Richotte	153' 6"	46.78m	2003
7	Jacob Whitting	150' 7"	45.90m	2017
8	Brian Walser	145' 8"	44.39m	2004
9	Brett Czubaj	144' 8"	44.09m	1995
10	Guy Diakow	143' 5¾"	43.73m	2001

Old Implement

Rank	Name	Mark		Year
1	Don Nufer	197' 2½"	60.10m	1950
2	Harry Hansen	175' 1"	53.36m	1934
3	Leroy Graziotti	160' 4"	48.86m	1946

Women's Javelin

Rank	Name	Mark		Year
1	Krista Switzer	129' 7"	39.49m	2006
2	Laura Gignac	125' 10"	38.35m	2003
3	Angela Machaj	125' 3"	38.17m	2005
4	Amanda Weber	124' 10"	38.04m	2005
5	Natalie Vizard	124' 6"	37.95m	2019
6	Angela Edwards	123' 7"	37.66m	2001
7	Val Turner	121' 1"	36.90m	2007
8	Tiffany Satterfield	106' 9"	32.53m	2000
9	Kyri Jackson	106' 4"	32.41m	2018
10	Ashley Schinske	103' 6"	31.56m	2010

=== Weight Throw ===
Men's Weight Throw

Rank	Name	Mark		Year
1	Colin Cashner	64' 11¼"	19.79m	2016
2	Eric Lewis	63' 6¼"	19.36m	2013
3	Bryan Grider	56' 11½"	17.36m	2002
4	Matt Groh	56' 7½"	17.26m	2002
5	Eric Leduc	55' 10½"	17.03m	2020
6	Guy Diakow	54' 5½"	16.59m	2001
7	Melvin Cross	54' 1"	16.48m	2007
8	Adam Mayhew	54' 0½"	16.47m	2009
9	Larry Grezak	52' 3¾"	15.94m	1997
10	Kelvin Cousins	51' 1¾"	15.59m	2006

Women's Weight Throw

Rank	Name	Mark		Year
1	Andrea Karpala	59' 5"	18.11m	2005
2	Kayla Smith	58' 8"	17.88m	2024
3	Tiffany Satterfield	57' 1½"	17.41m	2001
4	Brittany Horne	56' 10¾"	17.34m	2010
5	Brynne Gustafson	55' 0¾"	16.78m	2019
6	Angela Machaj	54' 4½"	16.57m	2003
7	Val Turner	54' 2"	16.51m	2008
8	Ashley Bauman	53' 8½"	16.37m	2005
9	Ashley Bayles	53' 0¼"	16.16m	2016
10	Wendy Gean	52' 10¼"	16.10m	1998

=== Indoor Combined Events ===
Men's Heptathlon

Rank	Name	Score	Year
1	Weston Glei	4550	2026
2	Taylor Hennrick	4480	2013
3	Jacob Whitting	4417	2017
4	Josh Neary	4303	2025
5	Simon Jones	4223	2025
6	Joseph Lietzow	4162	2022
7	Anthony Donald	4141	2011
8	Justin Koch	3886	2020
9	Avery Duncan	3859	2022
10	Dylan Kruis	3739	2014

Women's Pentathlon

Rank	Name	Score	Year
1	Aisha Potts-Tyre	3430	2015
2	Kyri Jackson	3299	2018
3	Hana Hunt	3189	2015
4	Ashley Schinske	3024	2009
5	Haley Lipscomb	2945	2026
6	Jada Clark	2888	2026
7	Amanda Campbell	2809	2012
8	Bri Soule	2805	2014
9	Michelle Moskal	2577	1998
10	Jhayla Mosley	2535	2016

=== Outdoor Combined Events ===
Men's Decathlon

Rank	Name	Score	Year
1	Taylor Hennrick	6192	2011
2	Weston Glei	5844	2026
3	Jacob Whitting	5734	2017
4	Joseph Lietzow	5655	2019
5	Simon Jones	5641	2025
6	Josh Neary	5640	2025
7	Andrew Heitzhaus	4868	2018
8	Jeffrey Senecal	4688	2013
9	Avery Duncan	4679	2023
10	Jarod Hoekstra	4378	2016

Women's Heptathlon

Rank	Name	Score	Year
1	Aisha Potts-Tyre	4659	2015
2	Kyri Jackson	4429	2018
3	Hana Hunt	4289	2014
4	Ashley Schinske	4100	2009
5	Amanda Weber	4004	2005
6	Bri Soule	3931	2014
7	Amanda Smith	3899	2005
8	Angela Edwards	3745	2001
9	Jada Clark	3692	2026
10	Amanda Campbell	3676	2013

== All-Americans ==
Outdoor track

Year	Name	Event	Place
1935	William Daly	Mile	4th
1997	Paul Caraballo	High Jump	7th
