= Berrien Springs Public Schools =

School district in Michigan

Address
- 285 Sylvester Ave. Berrien Springs, Berrien County, Michigan, 49103; United States

District information
- Motto: Together, inspiring students to think, learn, achieve and care in a global community.
- Grades: Pre-Kindergarten-12
- Superintendent: Dr. Thomas Bruce
- Schools: 9
- Budget: $78,726,000 2022-2023 expenditures
- NCES District ID: 2605430

Students and staff
- Students: 4,993 (2024-2025)
- Teachers: 165.72 FTE (2024-2025)
- Staff: 494.66 FTE (2024-2025)
- Student–teacher ratio: 30.13 (2024-2025)

Other information
- Website: www.homeoftheshamrocks.org

Berrien Springs Public Schools is a public school district in Berrien County, Michigan. It serves Berrien Springs and parts of Berrien Township, Oronoko Township, and Royalton Township.

== History ==
Berrien Springs High School opened in late 1960 with a capacity of 600 students. The designer was Mauer & Mauer architects of South Bend, Indiana. The high school enrollment during the 2023-2024 school year was 551 students.

The predecessor to the current high school was built in 1928 as an addition to a school built in 1908. It was demolished in 1976, and the site became part of Old Courthouse Square. Ultimately, the Berrien Springs Public Library was built on the site.

Berrien Springs Public Schools grew from 1,525 students in the 2000-2001 school year to 4,730 students during the 2023-2024 school year. The district's enrollment increased by 212.3 percent between 2004 and 2024, the largest percentage increase in Michigan. During the 2023-2024 school year, more than half of the district's total number of students were enrolled in its largest school, Link Learning Virtual Program. This online high school is one of three online schools administered by the district (counting the West Michigan Virtual Middle/High Schools as one school) that are open to all Michigan residents. Additionally, the district serves as an educational services provider for Vicksburg Public Schools' Success Virtual Learning Centers of Michigan. Berrien Springs Virtual Academy online school serves students who are homeschooled. It is a unique program for a public school district.

As of the 2023-2024 school year, 63.4 percent of Berrien Springs students are enrolled in online schools. In fall 2025, in-person enrollment was 2,295 students.

== Schools ==
Berrien Springs Schools
School	Address	Notes
Berrien Springs High School	201 Sylvester Ave., Berrien Springs	Grades 9-12. Built 1960.
Berrien Springs Middle School	502 Middle School Dr., Berrien Springs	Grades 6-8
Sylvester Elementary	101 Sylvester Ave, Berrien Springs, MI	Grades 2-5
Mars Elementary	430 W. Mars St., Berrien Springs	Grades PreK-2
Discovery Academy	242 Sylvester Ave., Berrien Springs	Alternative online high school, partially in-person on the Berrien Springs Public Schools campus. Grades 9-12.
Virtual Academy	501 Middle School Dr./P.O. Box 130, Berrien Springs	Online school. Grades K-12.
Link Learning	9057 Belding Rd. Ste 4, Belding, MI	Online school open to all Michigan students in grades 9-12 and administered by Berrien Springs Public Schools.
Success Virtual Learning Centers of Michigan	7188 Avenue B, Vestaburg, MI	Online school open to all Michigan students in grades 9-12. Administered by Vestaburg Community Schools. Berrien Springs Public Schools is an educational services provider for this school, but its students are not considered as belonging to Berrien Springs by the National Clearinghouse for Educational Statistics.
West Michigan Virtual	35 Hamblin Ave. W, Battle Creek, MI	Online school open to all Michigan students in grades 6-12 and administered by Berrien Springs Public Schools.
