= Jim Reynolds (Canadian football) =

Canadian football player (1938–2017)

Profile
- Position: End

Personal information
- Born: January 10, 1938; Poland, Ohio, U.S.
- Died: April 16, 2017 (aged 79)
- Listed height: 6 ft 2 in (1.88 m)
- Listed weight: 210 lb (95 kg)

Career information
- High school: Benton Harbor (MI)
- College: Hillsdale

Career history
- 1960–1962, 1968: Ottawa Rough Riders
- 1962–1965: Montreal Alouettes
- 1965–1967: Hamilton Tiger-Cats
- 1967: Toronto Argonauts

Awards and highlights
- Grey Cup champion (1965)

James Ben Reynolds (January 10, 1938 – April 16, 2017) was an American professional football player who played for the Hamilton Tiger-Cats, Toronto Argonauts, Ottawa Rough Riders, and Montreal Alouettes. He won the Grey Cup with the Tiger-Cats in 1965. He played college football at Hillsdale College in Michigan.
