= Benton Harbor High School =

Location
- 870 Colfax Avenue; Benton Harbor, Michigan 49022; United States
- 42°06′12″N 86°27′26″W

Information
- Type: Public high school
- School district: Benton Harbor Area Schools
- Superintendent: Robert Herrera
- Teaching staff: 33.30 (on an FTE basis)
- Grades: 9–12
- Enrollment: 506 (2023-2024)
- Student to teacher ratio: 14.21
- Colors: Orange; Black
- Athletics conference: Lakeland Conference
- Nickname: Tigers
- Website: bhhs.bhas.org/o/bhhs

Benton Harbor High School is a high school in Benton Harbor, Michigan, United States, and is part of Benton Harbor Area Schools.

== History ==
The current high school opened on August 29, 1921, being dedicated the following September 15. The school's main outdoor athletic facility, Filstrup Field, opened in October 1924.

By 1965, as a result of redistricting, the school was the only public high school in Benton Harbor.

In 2009, the school received a $52,000 grant from the U.S. federal government's stimulus program to upgrade its cafeteria equipment. The school was eligible for the grant because more than half its students were eligible to receive free or reduced-cost school meals.

== Demographics ==
The demographic breakdown of the 613 students enrolled in 2016-17 was:

- Male - 50.7%
- Female - 49.3%
- Black - 94.5%
- Hispanic - 2.1%
- White - 1.8%
- Multiracial - 1.6%

63.6% of the students were eligible for free or reduced-cost lunch. In 2016–17, Benton Harbor was a Title I school.

== Athletics ==
The Benton Harbor Tigers compete in the Lakeland Conference. The school colors are orange and black. The following Michigan High School Athletic Association (MHSAA) sanctioned sports are offered:

- Baseball (boys)
- Basketball (girls and boys)
  - Boys state champion - 1941, 1944, 1964, 1965, 2018
  - Girls state champion - 2009
- Cross country (girls and boys)
- Football (boys)
- Golf (boys)
- Softball (girls)
- Track (girls and boys)
  - Boys state champion - 1941, 1950, 1970
  - Girls state champion - 1984
- Volleyball (girls)
- Wrestling (boys)

== Notable alumni ==
- Joique Bell, NFL football player
- Harry Joe Brown, film producer
- Chris Burkam, MLB player (St. Louis Browns)
- Wilson Chandler, NBA player, first round pick (#23) in draft; named Mr. Basketball in 2005
- Tyrone Evans Clark, filmmaker, actor, video game designer, and musician
- Kysre Gondrezick, WNBA basketball player
- Don Hopkins, MLB player (Oakland Athletics)
- Ernie Hudson, actor
- Iris Kyle, professional bodybuilder
- Dave Machemer, professional baseball player
- Anthony Miller, NBA player for several teams
- William Perigo, former University of Michigan basketball head coach, coached Benton Harbor High
- Jim Reynolds, former Canadian football player
- Sinbad, comedian and actor
- Chet Walker, NBA basketball player in Hall of Fame
- Robert Whaley, NBA player
