= Buchanan North and West Neighborhoods Historic District =

Historic district in Michigan, United States

- U.S. National Register of Historic Places
- U.S. Historic district
- Michigan State Historic Site
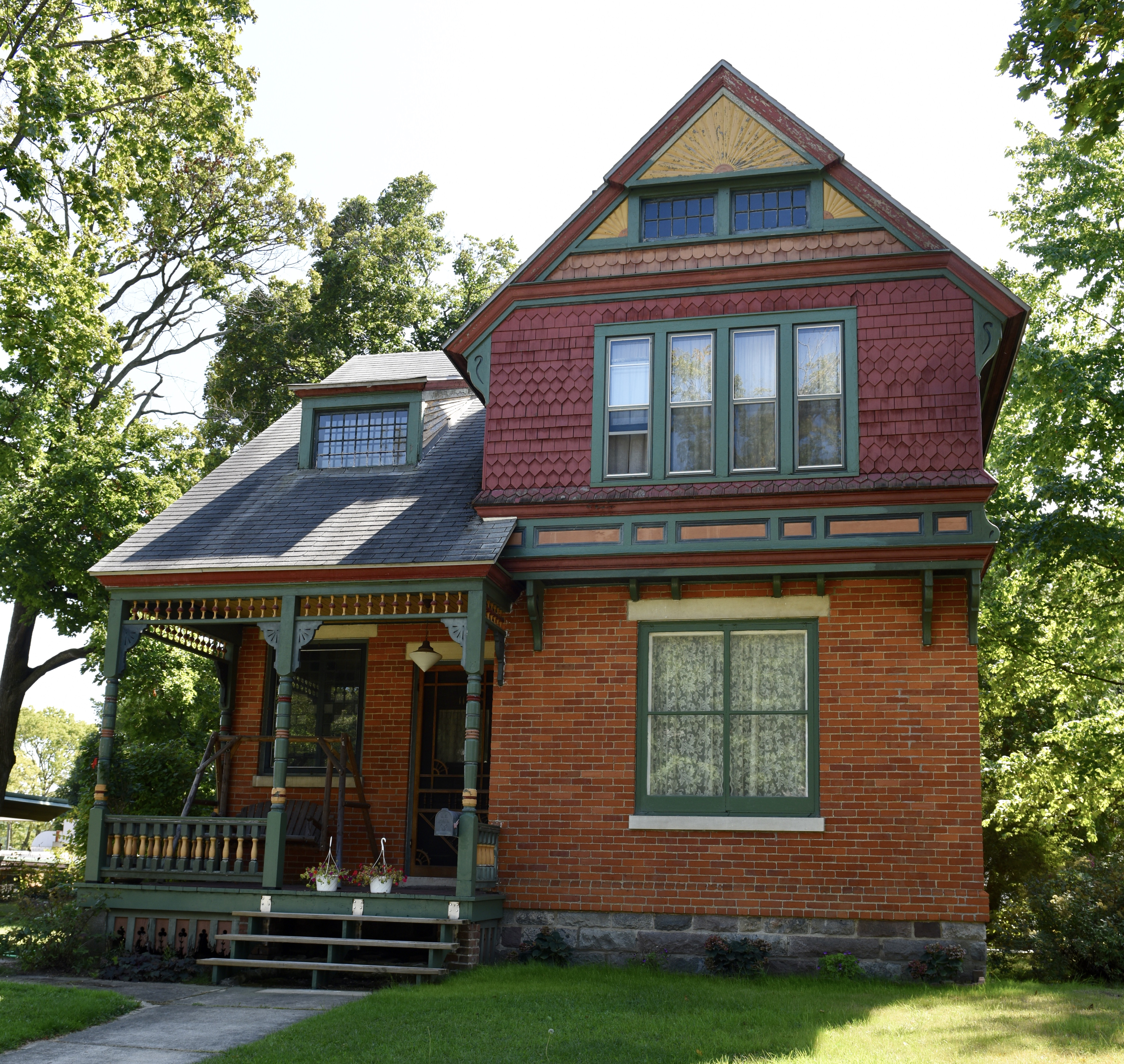
- 119 Front Street

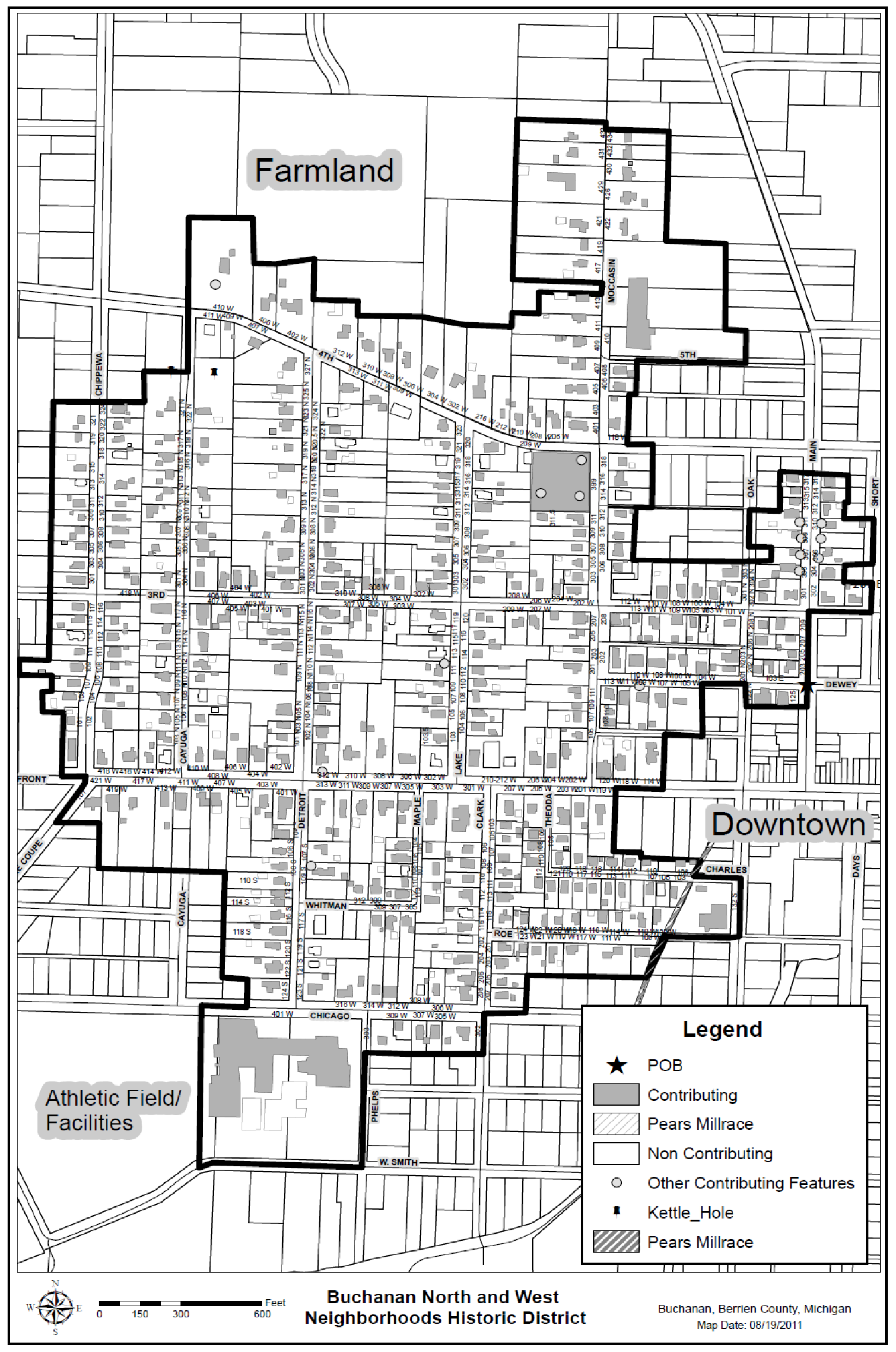
- Map of the Buchanan North & West Neighborhoods Historic District
- Interactive map
- Location: Roughly bounded by Main, 4th, Chippewa, W. Front, S. Detroit, Chicago, Clark, Roe, and Charles Sts., Buchanan, Michigan
- Architect: Lorenzo Alexander, William Wallace Cameron, et al.
- Architectural style: Italianate, Greek Revival, Stick/Eastlake, Queen Anne, Bungalow/craftsman, etc.
- NRHP reference No.: 11000863
- Added to NRHP: November 30, 2011

The Buchanan North and West Neighborhoods Historic District is a residential historic district located in Buchanan, Michigan and roughly bounded by Main, 4th, Chippewa, West Front, South Detroit, Chicago, Clark, Roe, and Charles Streets. It was listed on the National Register of Historic Places in 2011.

== History ==
Buchanan was first settled by Charles Cowles in 1833. Cowles constructed a sawmill near here. By 1841, there were four cabins, a gristmill, a sawmill and a distillery in the area, and in 1842 mill operator John Hamilton platted the village of Buchanan. Early development is not well documented, but a number of mills were built in Buchanan, drawing in workers. In 1843, a frame school was built within what is now this historic district. In 1849, the United Brethren Church (still extant) was constructed within the district, and the next year the first Presbyterian church followed.

Following the arrival of the Michigan Central Railroad in 1849, development boomed. Manufacturing facilities within Buchanan grew quickly, increasing the need for workers and new homes, most of which were located within this district. The village was incorporated in 1858 with 860 people; population had doubled by 1860. By 1878, the village population had increased to 2,300 people, who lived in 463 private homes.

In 1905, the company that would eventually become the Clark Equipment Company moved to Buchanan, employing about 30 people. By the end of World War I, the number had increased to over 800 employees. The 1910s saw a correspondingly large growth in the housing stock in the district, and in 1922 the Buchanan High School was constructed at the southern edge of the district. In 1929, the company's total employment was near 1,300 people. Although there was a slowdown during the Great Depression, the last lots in the district were nearly filled in the 1940-49 period.

== Description ==
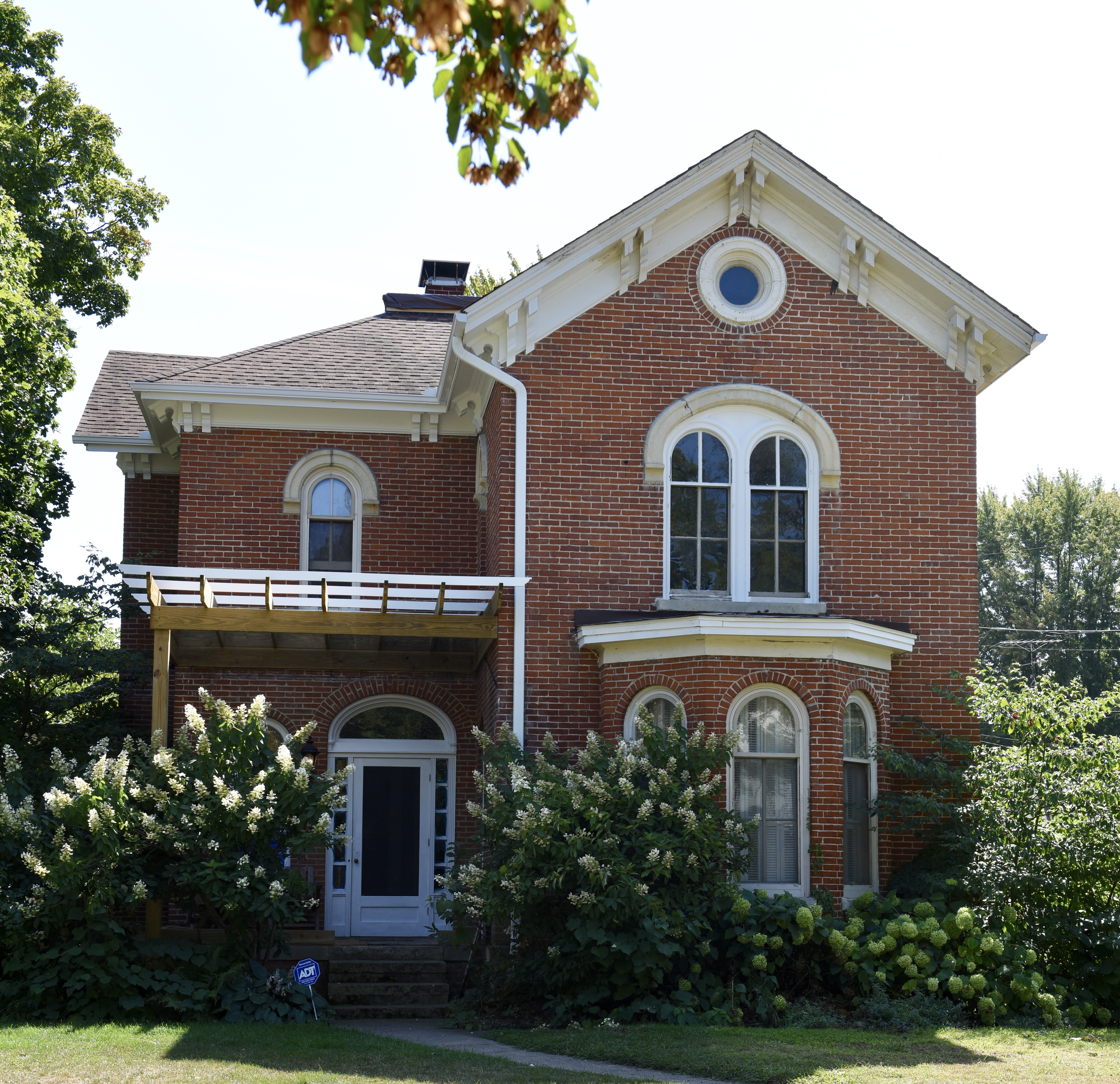
The Fulton House

The Buchanan North and West Neighborhoods Historic District is located north and west of downtown Buchanan. It contains 698 buildings, mostly residential, as well as a small number of churches, schools, commercial buildings and other features. The district contains 428 "primary" buildings, including houses, churches, schools and commercial buildings, with the remainder being mostly garages and barns. These buildings range in height from one to two stories, with two-story buildings predominating, and date from the 1840s to the 21st century. Architectural styles include Greek Revival and Italianate, and other styles up to International Style and ranch.

The houses in the district are primarily wood framed, except for the larger houses located along Front Street, where brick and stone houses are more common. The district is largely intact, and has a high degree of integrity overall, with very few newer buildings constructed at the site of older ones.
