= River Valley High School (Michigan) =

River Valley Middle/High School

Location
- 15480 Three Oaks Road; Three Oaks, Michigan 49128; United States; 41°50′20″N 86°36′41″W

Information
- Type: Secondary school
- School district: River Valley School District
- Superintendent: Dave Campbell
- Principal: Mark Bensinger
- Teaching staff: 20.40 (on an FTE basis)
- Grades: 6-12
- Enrollment: 287 (2022-23)
- Student to teacher ratio: 14.07
- Colors: Navy and white
- Athletics conference: BCS League
- Nickname: Mustangs
- Website: www.rivervalleyschools.org

River Valley High School is the high school for the River Valley School District located in Three Oaks, Michigan, United States. River Valley High School houses grades 6-12.

== Demographics ==
The demographic breakdown of the 315 students enrolled for 2017-18 was:

- Male - 54.9%
- Female - 45.1%
- Native American/Alaskan - 1.3%
- Asian - 0.3%
- Black - 1.0%
- Hispanic - 4.1%
- White - 89.5%
- Multiracial - 3.8%

49.2% of these students were eligible for free or reduced-cost lunch. For 2017–18, River Valley was a Title I school.

== Athletics ==
Merger with New Buffalo Athletics starting in 2021. All varsity sports are merged effective Spring 2026. New team name is Red Arrow Raiders. Middle School sports remain largely with their home districts. The River Valley Mustangs compete in the BCS League. Navy blue and white are the school colors. The following Michigan High School Athletic Association (MHSAA) sanctioned sports are offered:

- Baseball (boys)
  - State champion - 1995, 1997
- Basketball (girls and boys)
  - Boys state champion - 1979
- Cross country (girls and boys)
- Football (boys)
- Golf (boys)
- Soccer (girls)
- Softball (girls)
- Track and field (girls and boys)
- Volleyball (girls)
- Wrestling (boys)
