= Wolverine Conference =

Sports league

- Conference: Michigan High School Athletic Association (MHSAA)
- Founded: 1952
- No. of teams: 3 Class A, 5 Class B
- Region: Southwest Michigan

The Wolverine "B" Conference (known commonly as the Wolverine Conference) is a high school athletic conference in southwestern Michigan. It is composed of 8 Class A and B schools from the MHSAA in Allegan, Cass, Kalamazoo, St. Joseph, and Van Buren counties. Current members include: Edwardsburg, Niles, Otsego, Paw Paw, Plainwell, Sturgis, Three Rivers and Vicksburg.

== Membership ==
=== Current members ===
School	County	Enrollment	Mascot	Colors	Class	Year Joined	District Website
Edwardsburg	Cass	761	Eddies	Orange/Royal Blue	B	2012	Edwardsburg Public Schools
Niles	Berrien/Cass	805	Vikings	Navy Blue/Vegas Gold	B	2021	Niles Community Schools
Otsego	Allegan	688	Bulldogs	Navy Blue/Vegas Gold	B	1952	Otsego Public Schools
Paw Paw	Van Buren	621	Red Wolves	Red/White	B	1961†, 2006	Paw Paw Public Schools
Plainwell	Allegan	816	Trojans	Royal Blue/White	B	1952	Plainwell Community Schools
Sturgis	St. Joseph	835	Trojans	Orange/Black	A	2014	Sturgis Public Schools
Three Rivers	St. Joseph	617	Wildcats	Purple/White	B	1967	Three Rivers Community Schools
Vicksburg	Kalamazoo	727	Bulldogs	Red/White	B	1954	Vicksburg Community Schools

=== Former members ===
School	County	Mascot	Colors	Joined	Left	Conference joined
Allegan	Allegan	Tigers	Orange/Black	1952	2022	SAC
Berrien Springs	Berrien	Shamrocks	Green/White	2012	2015	BCS
Coloma	Berrien	Comets	Forest Green/Gold	2012	2015	SAC
Comstock	Kalamazoo	Colts	Carolina Blue/White	1966	2014	Kalamazoo Valley
Dowagiac	Cass	Chieftains	Orange/Black	2006	2022	Lakeland
Gull Lake	Kalamazoo	Blue Devils	Navy/White	1974	2011	SMAC
Kalamazoo University	Kalamazoo	Cubs	Red/White	1952	1966	none (school closed)
Portage Central	Kalamazoo	Mustangs	Blue/Gold	1952	1958	SMAC
South Haven	Van Buren/Allegan	Rams	Purple/Gold	1952	2020	BCS

=== Membership Timeline (since 1952) ===
Full members

== History ==
Early Days (1952-1960)

The Wolverine Conference was formed in 1952, consisting of Allegan, Western State High (Kalamazoo), Otsego, Plainwell, Portage, and South Haven. Five boys sports were sponsored by the league that first year: football, basketball, baseball, tennis and track. Girls sports were added in the 1973-74 year with basketball, tennis, softball and track being the sponsored sports. Portage left for the SMAC in 1958. The Wolverine expanded for the first time in 1954, adding Vicksburg to the conference. The Wolverine "B" Conference has always consisted of mostly Class B high schools, but there are bylaws in case a school is Class A for more than two years. In that instance, over 75% of schools must approve said school's membership and the school's case is reviewed every year.

Further Expansion (1960-2005)

The Wolverine began adding more schools beginning in the 1960s. Paw Paw High School was the first to join in this decade, moving from the Kalamazoo Valley Conference in 1961. Kalamazoo University High closed in 1966, with Comstock joining the same year from the Kalamazoo Valley Conference, and Three Rivers from the Twin Valley Conference a year after in 1967. Gull Lake High School joined the conference in 1974. This kicked off a long period of stability within the Wolverine, with the only exception being Paw Paw returning to the Kalamazoo Valley in 1982.

Major Realignment (2006–present)

The new millennium brought major changes to the Wolverine Conference. In 2006, Paw Paw left the Kalamazoo Valley and once again rejoined the Wolverine, while Dowagiac joined the conference from the SMAC. Five years later, Gull Lake, dominant in many sports, left for the SMAC. Looking into expanding, the Wolverine raided the nearby Lakeland Conference, with Berrien Springs, Coloma, and Edwardsburg entering the conference. This, for the first time, created divisions within the Wolverine, with the alignment as follows from 2012 through 2014:

West Division	East Division
Berrien Springs	Allegan
Coloma	Comstock
Dowagiac	Otsego
Edwardsburg	Paw Paw
South Haven	Plainwell
Three Rivers	Vicksburg

Then, after the 2014 school year, Comstock left the Wolverine for the Kalamazoo Valley, replaced by Sturgis from the SMAC. To accommodate these changes, Paw Paw and Three Rivers switched divisions, making new divisions for the 2014-15 year as follows:

West Division	East Division
Berrien Springs	Allegan
Coloma	Otsego
Dowagiac	Plainwell
Edwardsburg	Sturgis
Paw Paw	Three Rivers
South Haven	Vicksburg

After the 2014–15 school year, Coloma and Berrien Springs, two of the smaller schools in the Wolverine, left for the Southwestern Athletic Conference and the BCS Conference, respectively, after only three seasons in the conference. This created a full 9-game football schedule for the conference, eliminating the need to have divisions after only three seasons. For the next five years, the conference remained the same, until South Haven, one of the founding members of the Wolverine, announced it will leave after 68 years for the BCS after the 2019–20 school year, leaving the conference at 9 teams in 2020. Niles became a member in 2021-22 returning the league membership to ten. This arrangement lasted one year, as Dowagiac decided to leave the conference after the 2021–22 school year, citing its significant enrollment gap with other conference schools.

== Current Champions ==
Season	Sport	Champion
Fall 2024	Cross Country (boys)	Three Rivers
Fall 2024	Cross Country (girls)	Otsego
Fall 2024	Football	Niles
Fall 2024	Golf (girls)	Otsego
Fall 2024	Soccer (boys)	Plainwell, Edwardsburg
Fall 2024	Tennis (boys)	Vicksburg
Fall 2024	Volleyball	Three Rivers
Winter 2024-25	Basketball (boys)	Paw Paw
Winter 2024-25	Basketball (girls)	Vicksburg
Winter 2024-25	Bowling (boys)	Edwardsburg
Winter 2024-25	Bowling (girls)	Three Rivers
Winter 2024-25	Competitive Cheer	Plainwell
Winter 2024-25	Wrestling	Three Rivers
Spring 2025	Baseball	Niles
Spring 2025	Golf (boys)	Otsego
Spring 2025	Soccer (girls)	Otsego
Spring 2025	Softball	Paw Paw
Spring 2025	Tennis (girls)	Edwardsburg
Spring 2025	Track and Field (boys)	Three Rivers
Spring 2025	Track and Field (girls)	Sturgis*

- Denotes state champion

† All spring 2020 sports were cancelled due to the COVID-19 pandemic
