= Great Northern UP Conference =

Sports organization

The Great Northern UP Conference, is an athletic conference for high schools in the Upper Peninsula of Michigan. It was formed in 1965 as the Great Northern Conference and changed its name to the A-B-C Conference in 1984, and again to its current name in 1990. The football conference was disbanded in 2023, but all other sports continue.

== Member schools ==
=== Current members ===
| Team | Location | Colors | Enrollment | Class | Joined | Previous Conference |
|---|---|---|---|---|---|---|
| Escanaba Eskymos | Escanaba | | 690 | B | 1965 | Great Lakes Conference (Independent from 1986 to 1988) |
| Gladstone Braves | Gladstone | | 428 | B | 2018 | Mid-Peninsula Athletic Conference |
| Kingsford Flivvers | Kingsford | | 548 | B | 1965 | Menominee Range Conference |
| Marquette Sentinels | Marquette | | 896 | A | 1973 | Great Lakes Conference |
| Menominee Maroons | Menominee | | 391 | C | 1965 | Independent |

=== Former members ===
| Team | Location | Joined | Previous Conference | Departed | Successive Conference |
|---|---|---|---|---|---|
| Escanaba Holy Name Crusaders | Escanaba | 1965 | Independent | 1970 | N/A (football team abolished) |
| Iron Mountain Mountaineers | Iron Mountain | 1965 | Menominee Range Conference | 1978 | Mid-Peninsula Athletic Conference |
| Luther L. Wright Red Devils | Ironwood | 1971 | Menominee Range Conference | 1987 | Independent |
| West Iron County Wykons | Iron River | 1968 | None (School opened) | 1988 (Independent from 1982 to 1986) | Independent |
| Sault Ste. Marie Blue Devils | Sault Ste. Marie | 2016 | Independent | 2017 | Independent |
| Stephenson Eagles | Stephenson | 1965 | Great Lakes Conference | 1966 | Land-O-Lakes Conference |

== Football ==
This list of conference champions goes through the 2022 season. 2022 is the last year that the GNC had a football conference, it will be disbanded for 2023.

| # | Team | GNC (1965–1984) | ABC (1984–1990) | GNC (1990–present) |
|---|---|---|---|---|
| 1 | Menominee | 1969, 1971, 1982, 1983 | 1986-1988 | 1994, 1997–1999, 2003, 2005–2007, 2011, 2013–2016, 2021 |
| 2 | Kingsford | 1965, 1969 | | 1990–1996, 2000–2002, 2004, 2008–2010, 2012, 2017, 2021 |
| 3 | Escanaba | 1966–1968, 1972, 1973, 1978-1982 | 1984, 1988, 1989 | 1994, 1998, 2018 |
| 4 | Marquette | 1975, 1976 | | 2011, 2018–2021 |
| 5 | Gladstone | 1982 | 1985 | 1998, 2022 |
| 5 | West Iron County | 1970, 1974, 1977 | | —N/a |
