= RBHS =

RBHS may refer to:

Australia

- Randwick Boys High School in Randwick, New South Wales

Canada

- Robert Bateman High School in Burlington, Ontario

New Zealand

- Rotorua Boys' High School in Rotorua, New Zealand

South Africa

- Rondebosch Boys' High School in Rondebosch, Cape Town, Western Cape

United Kingdom

- Rivington and Blackrod High School in Bolton, England

United States

- Rainier Beach High School in Seattle, Washington
- Rancho Bernardo High School in San Diego, California
- Red Bank High School in Red Bank, Tennessee
- Red Bay High School in Red Bay, Alabama
- Red Bluff High School in Red Bluff, California
- River Bluff High School in Lexington, South Carolina
- Riverside Brookfield High School in Riverside, Illinois
- Roanoke-Benson High School in Roanoke, Illinois
- Rock Bridge High School in Columbia, Missouri
- Roger Bacon High School in St. Bernard, Ohio
- Ross Beatty Junior/Senior High School in Cassopolis, Michigan
- Rutgers Biomedical and Health Sciences, now Rutgers Health, in Newark, New Brunswick, Piscataway, and Camden, New Jersey
