= Guy Murray =

Current position
- Title: Head coach
- Team: Detroit

Playing career
- 1985-1989: Detroit

Coaching career (HC unless noted)
- 1989-1993: Detroit (asst.)
- 1993-present: Detroit

Accomplishments and honors

Championships
- 2 Horizon League Men's Cross Country • (2013, 2014) 2 Horizon League Men's Indoor Track • (1996, 2000); 4 Horizon League Women's Indoor Track • (1996, 1998, 1999, 2002); 1 Horizon League Men's Outdoor Track • (2003) 2 Horizon League Women's Outdoor Track • (1999, 2000)

Awards
- 12 Horizon League Coach of the Year

Guy Murray is the current men's and women's cross country and track and field head coach at the University of Detroit Mercy. Murray was one of the top runners in U of D history as a distance runner and he was also a marathon runner. As a coach, Murray has won numerous awards and championships in collegiate running.

== Running career ==
Murray was a standout runner at Brandywine High in Niles, Michigan before running at the University of Detroit. At Detroit, Murray was a four-year letter winner (1985–1989) in cross country, indoor, and outdoor track and field. In cross country, Murray was All-Midwestern Collegiate Conference (MCC) in 1986 and followed that by winning the Dominick Taddonio award, awarded to the cross country MVP, in 1988. In track and field, Murray was All-MCC in 1989. He earned the University of Detroit President's Award, awarded to the top senior student-athlete, in 1989.

Following his college athletic career, Murray competed in the Grandma's Marathon and finished 19th in 1999 to qualify for the US Olympic Trials. At the 2000 trials, Murray finished 57th.

== Coaching career ==
Following his graduation, Murray was an assistant to then head coaches Earl Clark and Kevin Donner from 1989-1993. In the fall of 1993, Murray was named director of track and field/cross country. In 1996, both his men's and women's indoor track and field teams won the MCC conference championship. Since then, the men's indoor track and field team was the MCC/Horizon League champions in 2000 and the outdoor team won the league championship in 2003. The women's indoor track team also won the MCC/Horizon League championship in 1998, 1999, and 2002. The women's outdoor track and field team was the MCC champions in 1999 and 2000. The men's cross country team won the Horizon League championship in 2013 and 2014.

In 2004, the men's track and field team was honored by the United States Track and Field & Cross Country Coaches Association (USTFCCCA) by having the highest GPA average in the country with a 3.324. The men's track and field team has been honored as an All-Academic Team by the USTFCCCA from 2003-2012 by having an average GPA over 3.00. The women's track and field team has been All-Academic in 2003 and from 2006-2012. The men's cross country team was All-Academic from 2003-2011. The women's cross country team was All-Academic from 2003–2006 and 2008-2011. Individually, seven different Titans have been selected Academic All-America by the USTFCCCA: Kim Hemstreet (2002), Kim Jess (1995), Andrea Karpala (2003, 2004, 2005), Ryan Byrne (2005, 2008), Krista Switzer (2006), Sinisa Simic (2007), and Amanda Smith (2008).

Murray has had 2 NCAA championship qualifiers; Kim Hemstreet in 2002 for cross country and Paul Caraballo in 1997 for the high jump. Caraballo placed seventh at the NCAA championships in the high jump earning him All-American honors.

== Bio ==
Murray currently lives in Redford, Michigan with his wife Patricia and their two children Kaitlin and Colin.

== See also ==
- Detroit Titans
- Detroit Titans Track and Field
