= Mid-Peninsula Athletic Conference =

Sports conference

The Mid-Peninsula Athletic Conference was an athletic conference for high schools in the Upper Peninsula of Michigan. It was formed in 1976. It was dissolved in 2018, with most of its members joining the Western Peninsula Athletic Conference.

== 2017 member schools ==
Team	Location	Enrollment	Class	Joined	Previous Conference
Gladstone Braves	Gladstone	481	B	2017	Great Northern UP Conference
Gwinn Modeltowners	Gwinn	287	C	1976	Great Lakes Conference (Independent in 1984)
Iron Mountain Mountaineers	Iron Mountain	302	C	1978	Great Northern Conference
Ishpeming Hematities	Ishpeming	329	C	1976	Independent
Ishpeming Westwood Patriots	Ishpeming Township	315	C	1976	Independent (Independent in 1988)
Manistique Emeralds	Manistique	304	C	1977	Independent (Independent in 1978 & 1989)
Negaunee Miners	Negaunee	400	C	1976	Great Lakes Conference
Norway Knights	Norway	214	C	1976	Independent (Independent in 1985 & 1993–1997)

=== Former members ===
Team	Location	Joined	Previous Conference	Departed	Successive Conference
Munising Mustangs	Munising	1976	Great Lakes Conference	2011	Skyline Central Conference/Mid-Eastern Football Conference

== Football ==
This list goes through the 2016 season.

#	Team	MPAC Championships	State Division Championships
1	Iron Mountain	1981–1985, 1989, 1992–1994, 1996, 1997, 1999, 2000, 2002, 2006–2008, 2011	Class C: 1993; Division 7: 2000
2	Negaunee	1977, 1985, 1987, 1988, 1990, 1991, 1995, 1997, 2002–2005, 2012, 2016	Division 6: 2002
3	Ishpeming	1978, 1979, 2005, 2009, 2010, 2013–2015	Class C: 1979; Division 7: 2012, 2013, 2015
4	Norway	1976, 1983, 1986, 2001, 2005, 2006	Class D: 1979, 1980
5	Munising	1980, 1983, 1985, 1989	Class C: 1980
6	Gwinn	1992, 1998	
7	Ishpeming Westwood	1992	
8	Manistique		
