= Niles High School =

Public high school in Niles, Michigan

Location
- 1441 Eagle Street; Niles, (Berrien County), Michigan 49120; United States
- Coordinates: 41.8357°N 86.2396°W

Information
- Type: Public high school
- Principal: Michelle Asmus
- Staff: 41.18 (FTE)
- Enrollment: 827 (2023-2024)
- Student to teacher ratio: 20.08
- Colors: Navy and Vegas gold
- Athletics conference: Wolverine Conference
- Nickname: Vikings
- Website: nilesschools.org/ncs/about-ncs/schools/niles-senior-high-school/

Niles High School is a public high school located in Niles, Michigan, United States. It is part of the Niles Community Schools district.

== Athletics ==
The Niles Vikings compete in the Wolverine Conference, joining the conference in 2021-2022. The Vikings were previously members of the BCS League for only a short time threw the 2020-2021 school year. Before This Niles was a part of the Southwestern Michigan Athletic Conference, of which they were founding members, leaving after 89 years. School colors are blue and gold. The following Michigan High School Athletic Association (MHSAA) sanctioned sports are offered:

- Baseball (boys)
- Basketball (girls and boys)
- Bowling (girls and boys)
- Cross country (girls and boys)
- Football (boys)
- Golf (girls and boys)
- Soccer (girls and boys)
- Softball (girls)
- Swim and dive (girls and boys)
- Tennis (girls and boys)
- Track and field (girls and boys)
- Volleyball (girls)
- Wrestling (boys)

== Notable alumni ==
- Edward L. Hamilton – politician, member of the United States House of Representatives from Michigan's 4th district.
- Paul Kell – American football player, played tackle for the Green Bay Packers, and the University of Notre Dame Fighting Irish
- Michael Tanke – soccer player, midfielder for the Rochester Rhinos, Indiana Invaders, and the University of Rhode Island Rams
- Original members of Niles based pop rock / psychedelic rock band Tommy James and the Shondells, including its namesake lead vocalist Tommy James.
- Ring Lardner, Sr. – satirist, short story writer, journalist, and sports columnist.
- Dr. Michael West – biogerontologist, a pioneer in stem cells, cellular aging and telomerase.
