= Niles Community Schools =

School district in Michigan

Address
- 1 Tyler Street Niles, Berrien, Michigan, 49120; United States

District information
- Grades: Pre-Kindergarten-12
- Superintendent: Dr. Adam Burtsfield
- Schools: 11
- Budget: $49,621,000 2022-2023 expenditures
- NCES District ID: 2625560

Students and staff
- Students: 3,143 (2024-2025)
- Teachers: 163.21 (on an FTE basis) (2024-2025)
- Staff: 409.46 FTE (2024-2025)
- Student–teacher ratio: 19.26

Other information
- Website: www.nilesschools.org

Niles Community Schools is a public school district in Berrien County, Michigan. It serves Niles and parts of Niles Township, Berrien Township, and Bertrand Township. It also serves parts of Howard Township and Pokagon Township in Cass County.

== History ==
A union school opened in Niles in September, 1856. Fifty Black students attended a separate school as of 1865, but the schools were integrated by 1870. A new high school was completed in 1923.

Marking one hundred years as a school district, the completion of the present high school was celebrated in May 1956 with an open house. The Niles Daily Star newspaper described the school's 1,250-seat auditorium as "specially designed for acoustic clarity" and noted the school's "glass block walls, skylights, and a variety of walls painted in pastel shades (that) provide an unusual amount of light." The architect of the high school was Eberle M. Smith Associates.

== Schools ==
Schools in Niles Community Schools district
School	Address	Notes
Northside Child Development Center	2020 N 5th Street, Niles	Grades PreK-K
Ballard Elementary	1601 Chicago Road, Niles	Grades PreK-5
Howard-Ellis Elementary	2788 Mannix Street, Niles	Grades K-5
Eastside Connections School	315 N 14th Street, Niles	Grades K-8
Ring Lardner Middle School	801 N 17th Street, Niles	Grades 6-8
Niles Cedar Lane	1 Tyler St, Niles	Grades 9-12 (Alternative)
Niles High School	1441 Eagle Street, Niles	Grades 9-12
Southside School	1450 Silverbrook Street, Niles	Special education school
