= Lakeland Athletic Conference =

U.S. high school athletic conference

The Lakeland Athletic Conference was a high school athletic conference created in 1980 and disbanded in 2014. Founding members were Buchanan Bucks, Berrien Springs Shamrocks, Brandywine Bobcats, Cassopolis Rangers, Edwardsburg Eddies, and River Valley Mustangs. Later, Dowagiac, Lakeshore, Lake Michigan Catholic were added before they all later departed.

In the 2003-2004 season, the Bridgman Bees joined the L.A.C. conference.

Former members include Bridgman Bees (football only), Dowagiac Chieftains, Edwardsburg Eddies, Lake Michigan Catholic Lakers, Lakeshore Lancers, and River Valley Mustangs. In 1991, Lake Michigan Catholic left the conference after joining from the Red Arrow Conference in 1989. In 1999, Lakeshore left the conference followed by Dowagiac, who left in 2001 after winning conference their last two years in Basketball (sharing with Berrien Springs in 2000). River Valley left the conference in 2010 to join the Red Arrow Conference. Bridgman became an independent football program in 2010. While Edwardsburg joined the Wolverine Conference in 2012.

== Member Schools ==
During the final year of conference play in 2013-14, the following schools were members:

- Brandywine High School
- Bridgman High School (except football)
- Buchanan High School
- Cassopolis High School

== Conference Champions (Football) ==
Year	Conference Champion(s)	Year	Conference Champion(s)	Year	Conference Champion(s)	Year	Conference Champion(s)
2019	N/A	2009	Buchanan Bucks/Berrien Springs Shamrocks	1999	Berrien Springs Shamrocks	1989	Dowagiac Chieftains
2018	N/A	2008	Coloma Comets/ Berrien Springs Shamrocks	1998	Berrien Springs Shamrocks/ Edwardsburg Eddies	1988	Buchanan Bucks
2017	N/A	2007	Coloma Comets	1997	Berrien Springs Shamrocks/Brandywine Bobcats/Edwardsburg Eddies	1987	Dowagiac Chieftains
2016	N/A	2006	Cassopolis Rangers	1996	Brandywine Bobcats/River Valley	1986	Blue- Berrien Springs Shamrocks/ Red- Dowagiac Chieftains
2015	N/A	2005	Edwardsburg Eddies	1995	Brandywine Bobcats	1985	Blue- Berrien Springs Shamrocks/ Red- Dowagiac Chieftains
2014	N/A	2004	Berrien Springs Shamrocks	1994	Lakeshore Lancers (Web site)	1984	Blue- Berrien Springs Shamrocks/ Red- Dowagiac Chieftains
2013	Brandywine Bobcats/ Cassopolis Rangers	2003	Coloma Comets	1993	Dowagiac Chieftains	1983	Blue- Berrien Springs Shamrocks/ Red- Dowagiac Chieftains
2012	Buchanan Bucks	2002	Coloma Comets/ Edwardsburg Eddies	1992	Lakeshore Lancers	1982	Blue- Berrien Springs Shamrocks/ Red- Dowagiac Chieftains
2011	Edwardsburg Eddies	2001	Coloma Comets/ River Valley Mustangs	1991	Dowagiac Chieftains	1981	Cassopolis Rangers
2010	Buchanan Bucks	2000	Edwardsburg Eddies	1990	Cassopolis Rangers/ Dowagiac Chieftains/ Lakeshore Lancers	1980	N/A

== Conference Champions (Boys Basketball) ==
Year	Conference Champion(s)	Year	Conference Champion(s)	Year	Conference Champion(s)	Year	Conference Champion(s)
2019	N/A	2009	Bridgman Bees/ Buchanan Bucks	1999	Coloma Comets	1989	Cassopolis Rangers
2018	N/A	2008	Berrien Springs Shamrocks	1998	Coloma Comets/ Lakeshore Lancers	1988	River Valley Mustangs
2017	N/A	2007	Bridgman Bees	1997	Brandywine Bobcats	1987	Berrien Springs Shamrocks/ River Valley Mustangs/
2016	N/A	2006	Bridgman Bees	1996	Coloma Comets	1986	Blue- Berrien Springs Shamrocks/ Red- Lakeshore Lancers
2015	N/A	2005	Bridgman Bees	1995	Coloma Comets/ Lakeshore Lancers	1985	Blue- Berrien Springs Shamrocks/ Red- Dowagiac Chieftains
2014	N/A	2004	Coloma Comets	1994	Coloma Comets	1984	Blue- Berrien Springs Shamrocks/ Red- Dowagiac Chieftains
2013	TBD	2003	Cassopolis Rangers	1993	River Valley High School (Web site)	1983	Blue- Cassopolis Rangers/ Red- Dowagiac Chieftains
2012	Buchanan Bucks	2002	Cassopolis Rangers	1992	Brandywine Bobcats	1982	Cassopolis Rangers/ River Valley Mustangs
2011	Buchanan Bucks	2001	Dowagiac Chieftains	1991	Berrien Springs Shamrocks	1981	River Valley Mustangs
2010	Bridgman Bees	2000	Berrien Springs Shamrocks/ Dowagiac Chieftains	1990	Berrien Springs Shamrocks/ Brandywine Bobcats	1980	N/A
