= West Iron County Middle and High School =

West Iron County High School
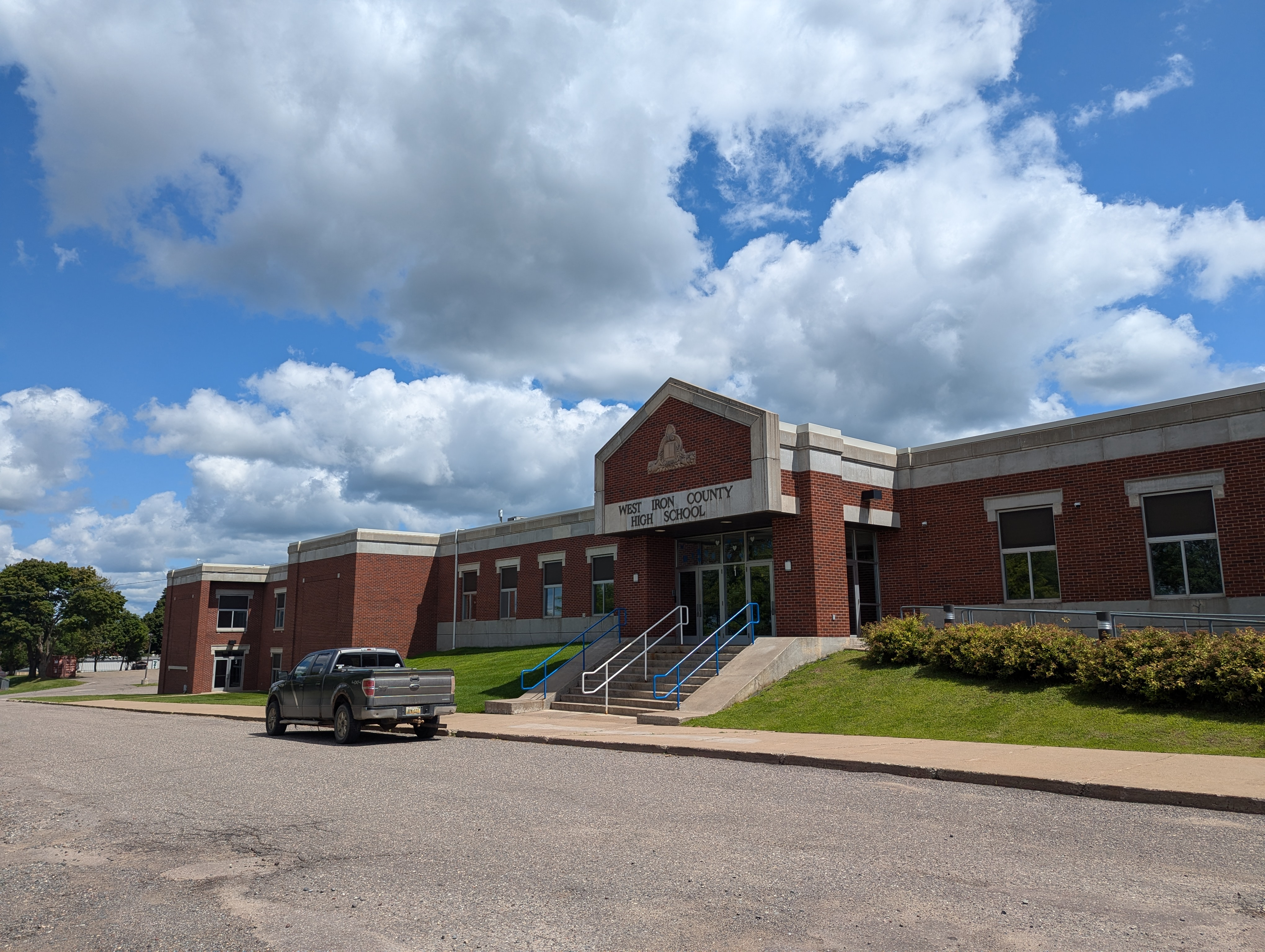
- Entrance to West Iron County Middle and High School (2024)

Location
- 701 Nick Baumgartner Way; Iron River, Michigan 49935; United States; 46°04′53.9″N 88°38′00.4″W

Information
- Type: Public high school
- Established: 1968
- School district: West Iron County Schools
- Superintendent: Kevin Schmutzler
- Principal: Mike Berutti
- Teaching staff: 24.28 (FTE)
- Grades: 9–12
- Enrollment: 403 (2023-2024)
- Student to teacher ratio: 18.04
- Campus type: Town
- Colors: Blue; White
- Athletics conference: WestPAC
- Nickname: Wykons
- Rival: Forest Park High School
- Yearbook: Wykon
- Feeder schools: Stambaugh Elementary School
- Website: westiron.org/24431_1

The West Iron County High School is one of two high schools in Iron County, Michigan. It is part of the West Iron County Schools. Their mascot is the Wykon. This school was a consolidation of "Iron River High School" and "Stambaugh High School".

== Notable alumni ==
- Nick Baumgartner: Winter Olympian in snowboard cross (2010, 2014, 2018, 2022) and gold medalist (2022)
- Jan Quarless: Division 1 head football coach
