= Berrien Springs High School =

High school in Michigan, United States

Location
- 201 Sylvester Avenue; Berrien Springs, Michigan 49103; United States; 41°56′46″N 86°20′45″W

Information
- School type: Public, magnet high school
- Motto: "Together, inspiring students to think, learn, achieve and care in a global community"
- School district: Berrien Springs Public Schools
- Superintendent: Thomas Bruce
- Principal: Stacey DeMaio
- Teaching staff: 32.91 (on an FTE basis)
- Grades: 9-12
- Enrollment: 551 (2023-2024)
- Student to teacher ratio: 16.74
- Colors: Green and White
- Athletics conference: Lakeland Conference
- Nickname: Shamrocks
- Rival: Buchanan High School (Michigan)
- Website: www.homeoftheshamrocks.org/schools/high-school//

Student assessments
- 2021–22 school year Change vs. prior year

M-STEP 11th grade proficiency rates (Science / Social Studies)
- Advanced %: 21.0 / 15.3
- Proficient %: 29.8 / 30.6
- PR. Proficient %: 12.9 / 43.5
- Not Proficient %: 36.3 / 10.5

Average test scores
- SAT Total: 973.1 (▼ −22.5)

Berrien Springs High School is a public, magnet high school in Berrien Springs, Michigan, United States. It serves grades 9 through 12 for the Berrien Springs Public Schools.

== Athletics ==
The Berrien Springs Shamrocks compete in the Lakeland Conference. School colors are green and white. The following Michigan High School Athletic Association (MHSAA) sanctioned sports are offered:

- Baseball (boys)
- Basketball (girls and boys)
- Competitive cheerleading (girls)
- Cross country (girls and boys)
- Football (boys)
- Golf (girls and boys)
- Soccer (girls and boys)
- Softball (girls)
- Swim and dive (girls and boys)
- Track and field (girls and boys)
- Volleyball (girls)
- Wrestling (boys)
