= Southwestern Michigan Athletic Conference =

Athletic conference

The Southwestern Michigan Athletic Conference (also known as the SMAC or the Big 16) is a high school athletic conference in Southwestern Michigan. It is composed of schools from the MHSAA in Berrien, Calhoun, Kalamazoo, and Van Buren counties.

== Membership ==
=== Current members ===
School	County	Enrollment	Mascot	Colors	Division	Year Joined	District Website
Battle Creek Central	Calhoun	960	Bearcats	Navy/Gold	3	1984	Battle Creek Public Schools
Battle Creek Lakeview	Calhoun	1,157	Spartans	Purple/White	2	1975†, 2001	Lakeview School District
Richland Gull Lake	Kalamazoo	978	Blue Devils	Blue/White	3	2011†	Gull Lake Community Schools
Kalamazoo Central	Kalamazoo	1,575	Maroon Giants	Maroon/White	1	1977	Kalamazoo Public Schools
Kalamazoo Loy Norrix	Kalamazoo	1,674	Knights	Navy/White	1	1960	Kalamazoo Public Schools
Mattawan	Van Buren	1,102	Wildcats	Navy/Gold	2	2001	Mattawan Consolidated Schools
Portage Central	Kalamazoo	1,385	Mustangs	Navy/Gold	1	1958	Portage Public Schools
Portage Northern	Kalamazoo	1,173	Huskies	Brown/White	2	1965	Portage Public Schools
St. Joseph	Berrien	921	Bears	Navy/Maize	3	1931-38, 1940	St. Joseph Public Schools
Stevensville Lakeshore	Berrien	761	Lancers	Red/White	4	2001	Lakeshore Public Schools

=== Membership Timeline (since 1928) ===
Full members Non-Football Member Football Only

== History ==
Early Days (1931)

The Southwestern Michigan Athletic Conference was formed as the "Big 5" on Feb. 2, 1928, and consisted of St. Joseph, Niles, Dowagiac, Three Rivers, and South Haven. This conference replaced the "Little 13" Conference that had been in existence since 1924 (originally known as the "Little 10" Conference). St. Joseph left in 1938 and then reappeared in 1940. The conference has been referred to as the "Big" followed by the number of schools in the league (such as Big 5, Big 6, Big 8, Big 16). However, the conference is now just known as the SMAC.

The 1970s

The league made its first big change in 1977 (then known as the Big 8) as (Battle Creek Lakeview, Holland, Loy Norrix, Niles, Portage Central, Portage Northern, and St. Joseph) and Independent Kalamazoo Central made up the membership of the conference. Portage Central won the first football title (7-0) and advanced to the Class A State Final, losing to Birmingham Brother Rice 17-7. Not everyone played all seven games in the league for football (Niles only played five and Battle Creek Lakeview and Portage Northern played six). Everyone played a full league schedule for football in 1978. Portage Central also won the first Boys Basketball league title (11-3, lost to conference foe Loy Norrix in districts). This original alignment stayed until 1984-85. There were some changes in store for the 1985-86 season. Battle Creek Lakeview and Holland left the conference to join other leagues. Lakeview rejoined the Twin Valley (which they would stay until the league folded) and Holland left to join the Ottawa-Kent Conference (currently playing in). With those schools gone, Independent Battle Creek Central and former Lake Michigan Conference member Benton Harbor. This lasted for several years (until 2000-01).

Changes

There was some talk in 2000 that the conference was going to expand into a super-conference. The longtime Twin Valley Athletic Association (at the time was the oldest conference in the State of Michigan) was going into peril as Albion, Hillsdale, and Parma Western wanted to leave the conference due to several factors, mainly declining enrollment (Battle Creek Lakeview was a Class A and Albion was a Class C school) and declining athletic performance (the three above mentioned were in the bottom of the league, as the bigger schools dominated the league). Independents Dowagiac and Stevensville-Lakeshore were struggling to find opponents (both schools were scheduling out-of-state opponents; Lakeshore played Rock Island, Illinois for one of their football games), and Mattawan's enrollment had outgrown the Kalamazoo Valley Athletic Association. The expansion was approved and was planned to start for the 2001 football season. Several areas of concerns regarding this new "super-conference" were noted, including travel, strength of programs, and tradition. Despite the problems, the new league added on five schools from the dissolved Twin Valley (Battle Creek Harper Creek, Battle Creek Lakeview, Coldwater, Marshall, and Sturgis; which made up the East Division), Mattawan from the Kalamazoo Valley, and Independents Dowagiac and Stevensville-Lakeshore. The league was split into three divisions listed below.

West Division	Central Division	East Division
Benton Harbor	Battle Creek Central	Battle Creek Harper Creek
Dowagiac	Kalamazoo Central	Battle Creek Lakeview
Niles	Kalamazoo Loy Norrix	Coldwater
St. Joseph	Mattawan	Marshall
Stevensville-Lakeshore	Portage Central	Sturgis
	Portage Northern	

Problems and later changes

Problems soon arose for the new configuration. East-West crossovers were at least 90 minutes to two hours away (teams would get home till close to midnight on school nights), and the Central Division schools were "bullying on" some of the smaller East/West Division schools (especially true for Dowagiac, which was the smallest school in the conference). In 2006-07, Dowagiac left the league to join the Wolverine Conference (along with Paw Paw, who also outgrew the Kalamazoo Valley). Also that year, Jackson Lumen Christi join the league for football only to make the league an even 16 teams (without Lumen Christi, one team in the league would have to go outside the conference every week). Lumen Christi played in the West Division for that season to replace Dowagiac's schedule (realigned to the East Division in 2007-08). With Dowagiac moving out of the SMAC, Mattawan moved to the West Division for the 2006-07 season to make three divisions of five teams each (didn't move to West in football until 2007-08 season).

For the 2009 football season (mainly due to cut down on travel), the league went to two divisions as Battle Creek Central and Kalamazoo Central moved to the East Division and the remaining teams in the Central went to the West Division. The league slightly realigned again in 2009 when Kalamazoo Loy Norrix moved from the Western to Eastern Division and Kalamazoo Central moved into the West Division. Even with Kalamazoo Central's two main rivals in the opposite division in football, the league allowed KC to keep playing Loy Norrix and Battle Creek Central during the first two weeks of the season. Kalamazoo Central's schedule does not allow them to play any games against the other schools in the Eastern Division. In other sports, the teams play each other, but as non conference games, with the boys basketball contest usually contested at Western Michigan University.

The leagues membership reduced to 12 after the 2013-14 school year as Coldwater, Harper Creek, Marshall, and Sturgis are set to leave the SMAC for different conferences in time for the 2014-15 school year. Sturgis is set to move to the Wolverine Conference while Coldwater, Harper Creek, and Marshall are set to form a league in the Jackson area.

Benton Harbor left the league in 2015-2016. One divisional alignment change starting for the 2018-19 season had Mattawan switching from the East Division to the West Division.

After the 2019-20 school year, founding member Niles left the SMAC after 89 years, joining the BCS Conference beginning in 2020-21. That same year, Loy Norrix left the SMAC in football only, remaining a member in all other sports.

Entering the Fall of 2026, the Southwestern Michigan Athletic Conference will realign by enrollment size. The SMAC-A will consist of the five schools with the largest enrollments while SMAC-B contains the schools with the five smaller enrollments.

== Current alignment ==
SMAC-East Division	SMAC-West Division
Battle Creek Central	Mattawan
Battle Creek Lakeview	Portage Central
Kalamazoo Central	Portage Northern
Kalamazoo Loy Norrix	St. Joseph
Richland-Gull Lake	Stevensville-Lakeshore

== Fall 2026 realignment ==
SMAC-A Division	SMAC-B Division
Battle Creek Lakeview	Battle Creek Central
Kalamazoo Central	Mattawan
Kalamazoo Loy Norrix	Richland-Gull Lake
Portage Central	St. Joseph
Portage Northern	Stevensville-Lakeshore
