= Ross Beatty Junior/Senior High School =

Cassopolis Ross Beatty High School

Location
- 22721 Diamond Cove Street; Cassopolis, Michigan 49031; United States
- Coordinates: 41°53′46″N 86°0′13″W

Information
- Type: Public high school
- School district: Cassopolis Public Schools
- NCES School ID: 260843004397
- Teaching staff: 12.88 (on an FTE basis)
- Grades: 7–12
- Enrollment: 259 (2023-2024)
- Student to teacher ratio: 20.11
- Colors: Blue and White
- Athletics conference: Southwest 10 Conference
- Nickname: Rangers
- Website: www.cassopolis.k12.mi.us/cms/one.aspx?pageId=18316869

Cassopolis Ross Beatty High School is a public high school in Cassopolis, Michigan, United States. It is part of the Cassopolis Public Schools district.

== Demographics ==
The demographic breakdown of the 393 students enrolled in 2017–18 was:

- Boys - 50.9%
- Girls - 49.1%
- Native American/Alaskan - 0.5%
- Asian - 3.3%
- Black - 18.1%
- Hispanic - 6.6%
- Native Hawaiian/Pacific islander - 0.3%
- White - 61.3%
- Multiracial - 9.9%

63.4% of the students were eligible for free or reduced-cost lunch. For 2017–18, this was a Title I school.

== Athletics ==
The Cassopolis Rangers compete in the Southwest 10 Conference. The school colors are blue and white, and the following Michigan High School Athletic Association (MHSAA) sanctioned sports offered, are:

- Baseball (boys)
- Basketball (girls and boys)
- Cross country (girls and boys)
- Football (8 player) (boys)
- Golf (boys and girls)
  - Boys state champion - 1971, 1973
- Soccer (girls and boys)
- Softball (girls)
- Track and field (girls and boys)
  - Boys state champion - 1991
- Volleyball (girls)
- Wrestling (boys)

== Theater-Drama Club ==
The has always been a sense of pride when it come the Theater and Drama Club and the Thespian Troupe 2323. Ada Barr was the English and Drama teacher at the High school in the late 80's.
