= Brandywine Middle/Senior High School =

Location
- 1700 Bell Rd; Niles, Berrien County, Michigan 49120; United States
- 41.799258°N 86.233455°W

Information
- Type: Public high school
- Established: 1961
- School district: Brandywine Community Schools
- Superintendent: Amanda Lezotte
- Principal: Evan Winkler
- Grades: 7-12
- Gender: coeduational
- Enrollment: 370
- Color
- Athletics conference: Lakeland Conference
- Team name: Bobcats
- Website: Official Website

Brandywine Middle/Senior High School is a public high school in Niles Charter Township, Berrien County, Michigan, United States. It is part of the Brandywine Community Schools district.

== Athletics ==
Brandywine Middle/Senior High School's athletic teams are called the Bobcats and they compete in the Lakeland Conference. School colors are gold and maroon. The following Michigan High School Athletic Association (MHSAA) sanctioned sports are offered:

- Baseball (Boys')
- Basketball (Girls' and Boys')
- Bowling (Girls' and Boys')
- Cross Country (Girls' and Boys')
- Football (Boys')
- Golf (Boys')
- Soccer (Girls' and Boys')
- Softball (Girls')
- Swim and Dive (Boys')
- Tennis (Girls' and Boys')
- Track and Field (Girls' and Boys')
- Volleyball (Girls')
- Wrestling (Boys')

== Notable alumni ==
- Diane Seuss — poet, finalist for a Pulitzer Prize
- Guy Murray — former cross country runner and current coach, head coach for both the men's and women's University of Detroit Mercy Titans cross country and track and field teams
