= Four Lakes Task Force =

Michigan Non-profit organization

- Abbreviation: FLTF
- Founded: September 1, 2018; 8 years ago
- Founder: Secord, Smallwood, Wixom & Sanford Lake Associations in Gladwin and Midland Counties, Michigan
- Type: Lake management
- Tax ID no.: 27-4698447
- Location(s): 233 East Larkin Street, Suite 2 Midland, Michigan
- Coordinates: 43°48′51″N 84°22′35″W
- Region served: Secord, Smallwood, Wixom & Sanford Lakes in Gladwin and Midland County, Michigan
- Key people: David Kepler Chairman & President; Kayla Stryker Treasurer/Secretary
- Revenue: $16,619,829 (2024)
- Expenses: $67,502,224 (2024)
- Employees: 5
- Volunteers: 7
- Website: www.four-lakes-taskforce-mi.com

Four Lakes Task Force (FLTF) is a 501(c)(3) non-profit organization located in Midland, Michigan, that maintains the inland dams and lake water levels of Secord, Smallwood, Wixom and Sanford Lakes (the Four Lakes), preserves the environment, promotes the safety and welfare of the public, enhances the health and recreational benefits from the Four Lakes, and conducts activities necessary or incidental to accomplish the foregoing.

== Organization ==
The FLTF is guided by a nine-member board of directors with two members each from Sanford, Wixom and Secord Lakes, one member from Smallwood Lake and one county commissioner each from Gladwin and Midland counties. Each lake association selects its board members, who can serve two three-year terms. Board members are not compensated for their service to the task force. As a Michigan nonprofit corporation, it operates under the set of bylaws adopted January 8, 2020. Yearly elections by the board of directors choose a chairman and officers: President, Vice-President, Secretary/Treasurer and General Counsel. There are three standing committees: Governance, Finance and the Environmental, health and safety advisory. Each has a chair, members and advisors.

== History ==
The Sanford, Edenville, Smallwood and Secord dams are earthen embankment dams with concrete spillways on the Tittabawassee River in Mid Michigan, United States, forming Sanford Lake, Wixom Lake, Smallwood Lake and Secord Lakes respectively. The dams were built in 1925-1926 for hydroelectric power by Frank Isaac Wixom. Wixom owned a circus before he built the dams. The dams were each equipped with two 2.4 MW turbines capable of generating 4.8 MW of electricity in total.

The dams were purchased in 2006, privately owned and operated by Boyce Hydro Power (BHP), a company based in Edenville.

=== Task force ===
In September 2018, volunteers from the Wixom, Sanford, Secord, Smallwood and Wixom lake associations gathered with industry experts "to ensure long-term viability of the four lakes." The group formally became the non-profit Four Lakes Task Force (FLTF), an IRS 501(c)(3) organization and also a NGO. They questioned the actions of dam owner/operator Boyce Hydro Power and whether revenue from hydroelectric power was sufficient to pay for adequate maintenance and dam management.

FLTF partnered with the Gladwin and Midland County Governments, became a county-delegated authority and assumed control with the intent of purchasing the four dams in 2019 for almost $9.5 million. with title to transfer in early 2022. The State of Michigan appropriated $5 million for the purchase. The FLTF planned to use funding from Gladwin and Midland counties together with assessments on property owners to pay for the acquisition.

The FLTF operates under the Four Lakes Assessment District in Michigan, created in May 2019 by Judge Stephen Carras. The FLTF represents approximately 6,000 property owners on all four lakes. In 2019, Michigan's 42nd Circuit Court was involved in determining if only the lakefront owners or all area residents would pay tax to the district.

== Dam failure ==
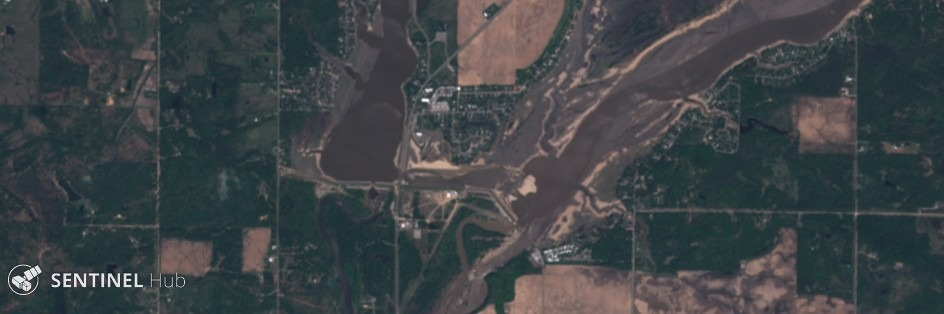
Copernicus Programme image of the dam after failure, showing the new river channel east of the original spillway.

On 19 May 2020 at 17:46 EDT heavy rainfall pushed inflows far beyond design capacity and a 900-foot section of the east embankment of the Edenville Dam gave way. Immediate, mandatory evacuations were ordered for residents of Edenville and nearby Sanford. Roughly 10 miles (16 km) downstream the impounded water overtopped – but did not breach – the Sanford Dam, forcing the evacuation of much of Midland, another six miles (9.7 km) downstream.

During the Great Michigan Flood of 1986, Gladwin County received over 7 inches (17.8 cm) of rain and nearly 12 inches (30.5 cm) fell on Midland County. In the three days prior to the dam failure, Gladwin County recorded nearly 8 inches (20.3 cm) but Midland County got less than 5 inches (12.7 cm), far less than in the flood 34 years prior.

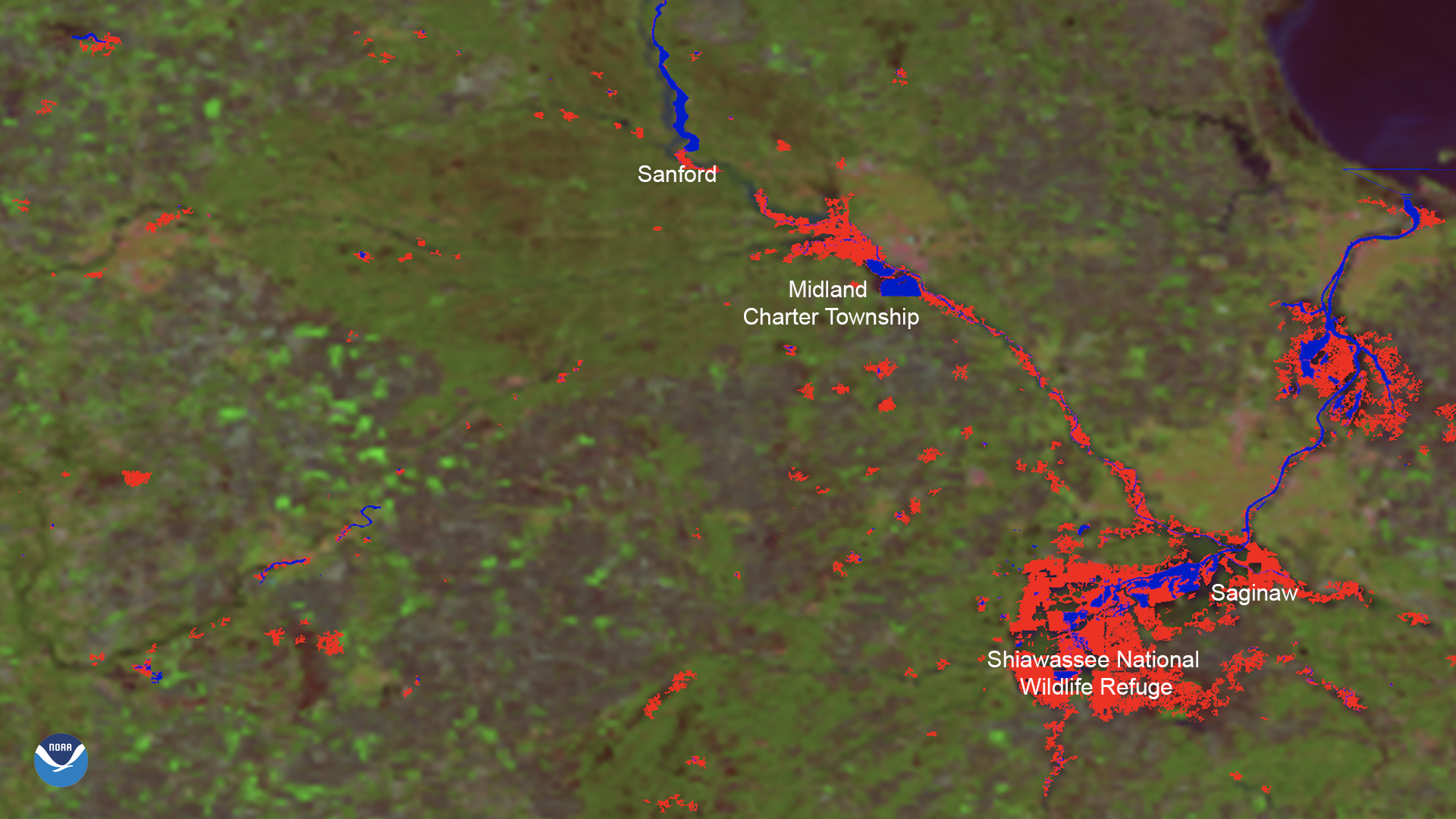
NOAA Satellite image of the flooding downriver including Midland and Saginaw.

Governor Gretchen Whitmer declared a state of emergency that evening and directed state regulators to open an investigation into Boyce Hydro, the dam's private owner. More than 10 000 people eventually fled their homes; officials also urged evacuees to observe social‑distancing rules because the failure occurred during the COVID‑19 pandemic.

The Tittabawassee River crested at 35.05 feet (10.68 m) during the night of 20 May, inundating eastern Midland and severely damaging the village of Sanford. Satellite imagery released two days later showed a new river channel carved around the failed spillway. Although floodwater surrounded parts of the Dow Chemical complex in Midland, the company reported no serious damage to critical infrastructure. No fatalities or serious injuries were recorded.

Fifteen houses in the neighborhood around the Sanford Dam were washed away and six other houses that were pushed off their foundations were razed.

The Midland County Road Commission estimated flood damage to bridges and pavement at about US$17 million.

== Aftermath ==
=== Lawsuits ===
Within days of the disaster three class‑action lawsuits were filed; plaintiffs alleged negligence by both owner BHP and Michigan's EGLE. On 8 September 2023 the Michigan Court of Appeals allowed those actions to proceed, citing a 2020 precedent stemming from the Flint water crisis. BHP declared bankruptcy. In early 2025 a Michigan Court of Appeals judge rejected the request for dismissal by Michigan Attorney General Dana Nessel and ordered the case against the state to commence in January 2026. An appeal by the state may be filed until June 2025.

=== Forensic Report ===
The FERC convened an Independent Forensic Team (IFT) to determine the technical cause of the breach. The team's final report (4 May 2022) concluded that the failure was "foreseeable and preventable." It traced the breach to loose sands placed in the 1920s embankment, which became saturated and underwent static liquefaction; the downstream face had also been built steeper than safety criteria allowed. The IFT emphasized that design errors, construction deviations and decades of regulatory oversights collectively doomed the structure long before 2020.^{(pp. S‑4 – S‑5)} Media coverage summarized the report as proof that the disaster was avoidable. The rainfall in the watershed of the Tittabawassee River was categorized as a once-in-a-200-year event. The flood was classified as a once-in-500-year event.

=== Compensation ===
The Detroit District of the U.S. Army Corps of Engineers notified Midland City and County governments that $1.2 million was provided in FY2025 to study riverine flooding in Midland County. The area has experienced major flood events in 1986, 1996, 2013, 2017, and 2020.

In 2023 the city of Midland received $5.5 million for infrastructure recovery and relief from Michigan Governor Gretchen Whitmer. Residents haven't been so lucky. Most did not have flood insurance. At a press conference outside the Midland County Courthouse on May 19, 2025, plaintiff's attorney Ven Johnson talked about the state's position:

"Think about the Flint Water Tragedy, because there's your blueprint for how the State of Michigan deals with infrastructure failure. No one went to jail, no one was prosecuted, and it was the civil lawyers who did what they did and exactly what we're doing in this case, to try to bring some semblance of justice that took them 8 1/2 years before the State of Michigan stepped up and began to take responsibility and pay for the damage of the lives that they cost and all the damage that they caused. Not a single dime has been collected by the folks behind me. Not a single dime has been offered by the State of Michigan."

To add insult to injury, every lakefront property owner is facing a special assessment for restoration to the lake and shoreline by the Four Lakes Task Force. Numerous residents who lost their homes are forced to pay an average of $48,000 over 40 years to keep their property. There are approximately 6,000 owners of property on the four lakes who will pay for the restoration. Families with small vacation cottages worth less than $50K "are being asked to foot a bill that's way too high for something they're not responsible for".

The Village of Sanford learned in June 2025 that $700,000 from Federal Emergency Management Agency will finally be disbursed, five years after the flood. Nearly $400,000 will reimburse the community for a new Village Park. Hazard mitigation of $200,000 will pay for the purchase of five parcels and moving those owners away from the floodplain. $100,000 from the Public Assistance Program will convert a dam repair road into a boat launch.

=== Restoration ===
In March 2022 the state enacted a US$4.8 billion infrastructure package that earmarked $200 million for reconstructing the four dams overseen by the FLTF. Early remediation redirected the Tittabawassee back through the original spillway, causing the temporary Edenville Falls—created in the breach channel—to dry up. Work began on the project using the state grant while county officials finalized local funding.

In May 2023 Dave Kepler, president of the FLTF announced that they expected all the lakes would be restored in 2025. In 2022 the 30 projects in the recovery phase for all four lakes were completed. Debris points were removed including boat lifts and docks, trees, lumber, boats and man-made items. More than one thousand were removed from Sanford Lake and 1,300 from Wixom Lake. Over 10,634 feet (3,241.2 m) shoreline was protected utilizing 48,335 tons of riprap. Much has been done, but issues still must be resolved.

Midland and Gladwin County officials approved a special assessment district (SAD) for lakefront property in February 2024 to pay for the rest of the $398 million project of dam repair to restore the lakes. The Heron Cove Association of property owners challenged the assessment and sued in circuit court. Work on the project stopped because of the uncertainty for repayment of bonds and state money was exhausted. The lawsuit was denied in circuit court, appealed at the Midland County Court of Appeals and again denied. The suit was then appealed and rejected by the Michigan Court of Appeals in March 2024. The lawsuit was appealed to the Michigan Supreme Court and a motion was filed by FLTF requesting a May 2025 decision.

The EGLE issued the final permit for the Edenville Dam in March 2025. The FLTF holds permits for the reconstruction of the four dams. After delays, the construction estimate is now $350 million. Four of the five construction phases are nearly complete and if the lawsuit is resolved early enough to resume construction this summer, Smallwood, Secord and Sanford done next year and Edenville in 2027.

On April 11, 2025 the Michigan Supreme Court rejected the appeal by Heron Cove Association, ending the legal challenges to the special assessments which will generate $218 million over the forty-year term. Construction resumed at all four lakes and the first $80 million bond financing was completed during the summer of 2025. The second bond should be issued summer of 2026. The Sanford Dam is now expected to be completed by the end of 2025. The FLTF plans to announce more accurate completion dates in October 2025.

The status of the lakes as of November 2026:

- Sanford Lake officially reached it's summer legal level on May 8, 2026.
- Smallwood Lake officially reached it's summer legal level on October 5, 2026.
- Secord Lake is expected to finish filling spring 2027.
- Wixom Lake is expected to finish filling in 2028.
