= Sanford Dam =

Sanford Dam could refer to:

- Sanford Dam, a dam on the Canadian River at Sanford, Texas, that formed Lake Meredith
- Sanford Dam (Michigan), a dam on the Tittabawassee River near Sanford, Michigan, that formed Sanford Lake
