= David Kepler =

American corporate executive (1927–1996)

- Born: David Edwin Kepler II; December 12, 1952 (age 73); Pleasant Hill, California, US
- Education: BS Chemical Engineering, University of California, Berkeley 1975
- Known for: Cyber security and risk management knowledge
- Spouse: "Patti" (m. 1975)
- Children: 3
- Parents: David Edwin Kepler Sr (father); Donna Jeanne Speer (mother)
- Engineering career
- Discipline: Chemical engineering
- Employer: Dow Chemical Company
- Awards: 20/20 Vision Award

David "Dave" Kepler (born December 12, 1952) is a former American business executive who worked at Dow Chemical Company for 39 years managing the company's safety, environmental and health resources through risk management and cyber security. He was honored in 2002 as a 20/20 Vision Award recipient. After retiring at age 62, he founded several Midland, Michigan businesses, serves as president and chairman of the non-profit Four Lakes Task Force and is co-chair of his family's foundation.

== Early years ==
Kepler was born in 1952 in Pleasant Hill, California, east of San Francisco. He was the oldest of three male children of David Kepler Sr and his wife, Donna Jeanne Speer. A sister died as a toddler.

Kepler's father and uncle had a hardware store and nursey, and all three brothers worked there as teenagers. His early work experience taught him three things: spend company money like it belongs to you; good customer relationships are essential; and "cash flow is critical". When he started college, he wanted to be an oceanographer but got hooked on chemistry and finished with a chemical engineering degree. He was recruited by Dow Chemical and was hired after graduation from the University of California, Berkeley. While in high school Kepler met Patti Mcclenaghan, who later taught kindergarteners in their hometown. The couple was married in 1975 and have three grown children and five grandkids. They celebrated their 50th wedding anniversary in 2025.

== Business ==
=== Dow ===
He was hired by Dow Chemical fresh out of college in 1975. In 39 years at Dow he worked in operations, supply chain, marketing, business management and information technology. Although his education was chemical engineering, he spent most of his career in IT. “Computers were being used [for] controlling plants, and that got me into the broader IT area,” Kepler commented.

Kepler became Dow's CIO in 1998 at age 46. Four years later he was recognized by CIO Magazine as an individual in IT who significantly impacted business. The magazine's bio of him called him a "practical risk taker" because he implemented cutting-edge technology and he used those experiences to avoid making poor choices. He changed Dow Chemical by using IT as a driving force and taking smart risks. Through his guidance, Dow Chemical was an early implementer of Enterprise resource planning in the 1990s and invested in Elemica, which creates the connections required to achieve the greatest benefit from a digital supply chain. Kepler steered the company to utilize voice-over-IP technology for transmission of telephone and data services. He also decided to return Union Carbide to an earlier SAP version rather than migrate to ERP when the two companies merged. He became known as an authority on information technology deployment and influential concerning cyber security and risk management.

He retired at age 62 in 2014 as Executive Vice President of Business Services, Dow's Chief information officer (CIO) and Chief sustainability officer (CSO). His career included assignments in Canada, the Pacific and the United States. Kepler's responsibilities included the company's safety, environmental and health resources. He chaired the executive oversight committee for Dow's sustainable performance and had oversight for Dow Canada.

=== Post Dow ===
Kepler and his wife founded Turtle Cove Properties, LLC (TCP) as a family-owned company focused on investing in properties and businesses that positively impact the community. They specialize in real estate development, including rental housing, commercial properties, apartments, and retail businesses. Additionally, they offer commercial leases and support for small businesses. Their goal is to enhance neighborhoods and create sustainable environments.

==== Ice cream ====
The year he retired, TCP purchased Cottage Creamery, a popular ice cream store adjacent to a micro-brewery in Midland on the northwest side of town. The store is an old-fashioned shop that one reviewer called, "the epitome of charm". They almost match Baskin-Robbins with nearly 30 flavors and offer shakes, malts, floats and sundaes in addition to cones or cups with a wide variety of toppings. For something less heavy, they make real fruit smoothies. The shaded back yard is landscaped like a park with tables, benches, Adirondack chairs and a firepit. The property adjoins the Pere Marquette Rail Trail, so there is a bike rack and a tool station for minor repairs.

==== Beer ====
The Midland Brewing Company (MBC) was established after prohibition ended in the 1933 and reopened in 2010. Prior to Dow Chemical, Midland's history was intertwined with the railroad and lumber industry. The Brewing Company used logging in its theme with prominently displayed history featuring the original recipe for "Red Keg Beer" and despite a resurgence in local microbreweries, the business stumbled and was close to foreclosure after a few years. When Kepler became aware of the situation, the TCP team inspected the plain brick 8,539 sq ft (793.3 m^{2}) building and discussed options. They decided to purchase it in 2016 and make it successful. MBC restarted in early 2017 following an extreme makeover inside and out to create an upscale dining experience including a side entrance and full commercial kitchen. New accommodations outdoors featured a 4,289 sq ft (398.5 m^{2}) stamped concrete patio, seating, a gazebo, a fire pit, cornhole and other yard games.

Two years later, MBC expanded to include a 2,500 sq ft (230 m^{2}) banquet hall to accommodate 100 guests on the 2 acres (0.81 ha) property at a cost of $1 million. The entrance of the Red Keg Barrel House is a huge red keg; it is a unique space for private events and is available for use by the community. There is also storage for craft beers and aging spirits. Bands were booked to perform in summer 2018 and there is an outdoor cooking area with barbecue and pizza oven on the side. A 1,000 sq ft (93 m^{2}) wood deck with a 550 sq ft (51 m^{2}) canopy overlooks the Pere Marquette Rail Trail. The yard behind the building was landscaped to become a beer garden.

At the 2019 Great American Beer Festival, MBC won a silver medal in the herb & spice category.

==== Developments ====
Beginning in 2018 TCP created three real estate developments in the Midland area. Pathfinder Commons and Pathfinder Terraces are 1 or 2 bedroom, one bath apartments; two bedrooms, two bath apartments, respectively. The Cove provides coworking office space solutions for remote workers, freelancers and entrepreneurs. The Cove 2 is currently under development.

== Corporate involvement ==
- Teradata Corporation, board member
- TD Bank Group, board member (2013–2024)
- U.S. Chamber of Commerce, board member
- National Infrastructure Advisory Council, member (7 years)
- Autoliv, board member (2015–2021)
- American Chemistry Council, board member

== Civic involvement ==
- National Safety Council, board member
- MidMichigan Innovation Center, former chairman
- Michigan Baseball Foundation, board member
- University of California, Berkeley Foundation, trustee
- Four Lakes Task Force, president and chairman

=== Foundation ===
In September 2015 David and his wife Patti established the Patricia and David Kepler Foundation in Wilmington, Delaware with a $3+ million endowment. Their stated mission was: "To improve the quality of life for families in our community." Over the past 8 years grants have averaged over $600K per year. Core beliefs: Volunteering and financial assistance should be together; human service providers require stability; social and economic development are linked for a better future. The focus of the foundation: independent living for disabled individuals; children and young adults must grow and develop; preserve and enjoy nature; improve the culture and economics of the community; community services should support families.

=== Ranch ===
The Kepler family operates the Lazy Turtle Ranch near Edenville, Michigan for fun experiences using outdoor and indoor play structures intended to engage youth/adults with nature. Their safe outdoor locations include the "Party Barn", a pavilion, a playground, and a campsite. The facilities are available for local non-profits that adhere to the foundation's mission. Typical organizations are Midland ARC, Scouting America, Girl Scouts, independent community living and Big Brothers Big Sisters.

=== Task force ===
The Four Lakes Task Force was founded in 2018, two years before the Edenville and Sanford dam failures, the resulting flood and emptying of Wixom Lake, Sanford Lake and lowering the water level of two others. Kepler, a property owner and member of the Sanford Lake Association, took an unpaid leadership role in the task force and has been a spokesperson for the non-profit, government-affiliated organization since then.

== Honors ==
Kepler was designated a 20/20 Vision Award individual by information technology periodical, CIO Magazine. In 2002 the magazine chose twenty IT practitioners and twenty IT marketers/creators. The awards recognized 40 "individuals whose vision, execution, and impact significantly influenced the business landscape". Those honored included Jeff Bezos, Michael Dell, Meg Whitman, B. Kevin Turner, Matthew Szulik,Gil Shwed, Thomas M. Siebel, Gregory Stephanopoulos, Hal Rosenbluth, Gary M. Reiner, Nigel Morris, Hasso Plattner, Scott McNealy, Teresa Meng, Ray Kurzweil, Mike Lazaridis, Subrah Iyar, David Kepler, Bill Gates, Lou Gerstner, Larry Ellison, William Esrey, John Doerr, Vint Cerf, Alfred Chuang, Robert B. Carter, Tim Berners-Lee and Matthew Szulik.
