= Virginia Harriett Kline =

Stratigrapher and geologist

Virginia Harriett Kline (July 14, 1910 – February 5, 1959) was a geologist, stratigrapher, and librarian who was heavily focused on fieldwork.

== Early life and education ==
Virginia Kline was born in Coleman, Michigan, to father Ray Kline and mother Abbie Young Kline on July 14, 1910. She attended high school and college in Lansing, Michigan, and eventually received her Bachelor of Science degree from Michigan State College in June 1931. Her undergraduate was completed at the University of Michigan, Ann Arbor, and she obtained her master's degree in June 1933, followed by her Doctor of Philosophy degree in geology in June 1935 for her thesis entitled Stratigraphy and Paleontology of the Silica Formation (Hamilton Age) of Southeastern Michigan. She earned a Bachelor of Arts degree in library sciences several years later in May 1942.

== Career ==
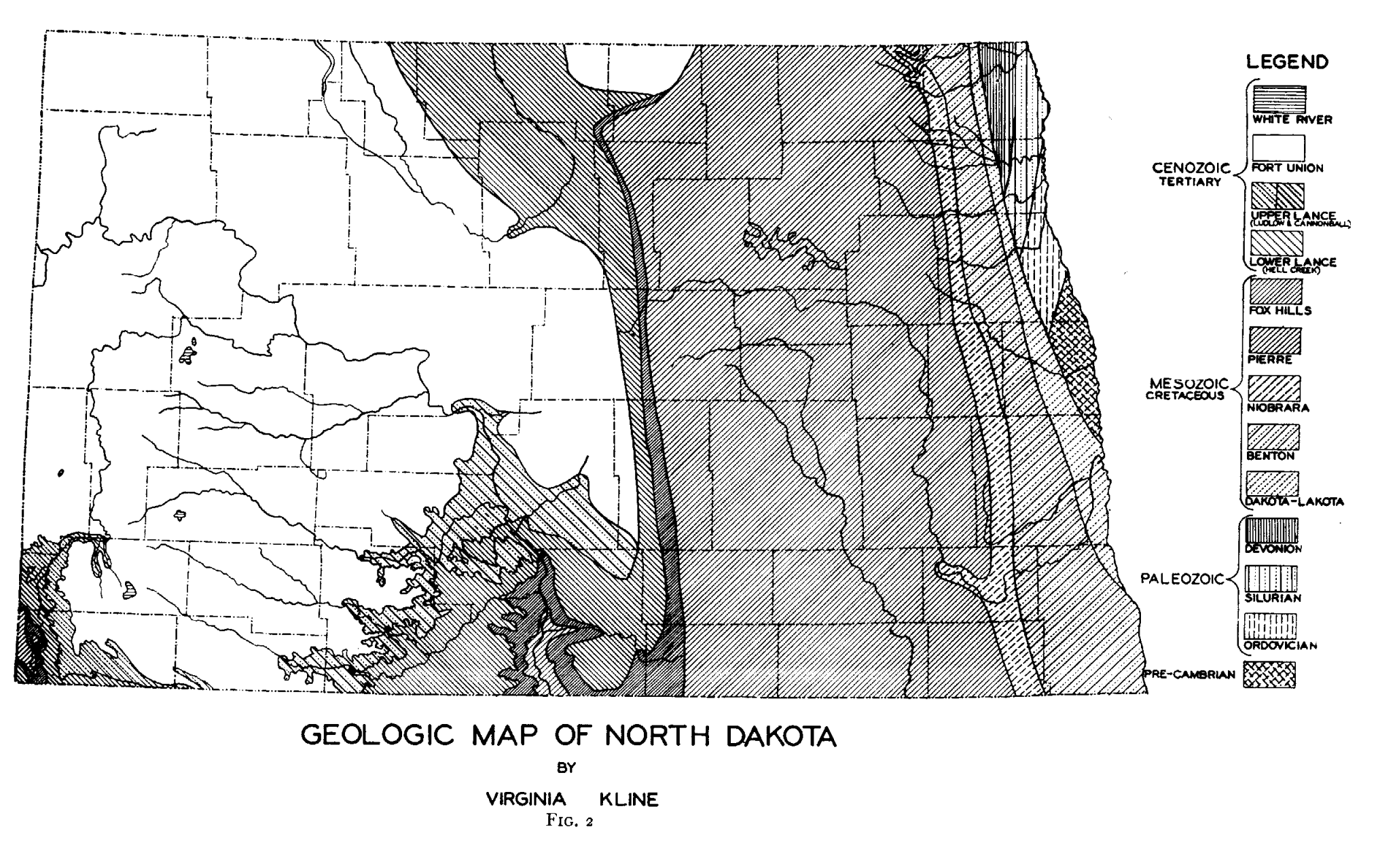
A geologic map of North Dakota from "Stratigraphy of North Dakota", that Kline produced while working for the North Dakota Geological Survey. The data for this map was collected from Klines own field work, historical data and additional work form Howard E. Simpson, Frank C. Foley, Frederick W. Voediseh, A. G. Leonard and C. J. Hares.

Kline started her career as a temporary stratigrapher in 1937, for the North Dakota Geological Survey in Grand Forks, North Dakota. During this time, she had the opportunity to spend most of her time in the field studying well samples, driller's logs, and fossil collections. Her first published work, "Stratigraphy of North Dakota" came as a result of the experience she acquired. This work collected data form many samples in and around North Dakota to create a geologic history of the state. Kline had a distinguished career working in her field of study for a number of companies in the Tri-State area of Illinois, Indiana, and Kentucky during 1940. These companies included Michigan Oil Exploration, Chapman Minerals Corporation and Sohio Producing Company, where she worked as the only geologist for all three during the depression. During this time she became familiarized with the stratigraphic characteristics of the area, and proficient in tasks relating to sample studying and well-sitting. In 1941 she undertook consulting work in Lansing, Michigan, while simultaneously studying for her library sciences degree, eventually working briefly as the librarian for the Civil Engineering School at the University of Michigan. The following year, she accepted a position at the University of Mississippi as associate professor of geology in the Department of Geology, in addition to becoming an assistant geologist within the Mississippi Geological Survey. This position granted her the opportunity to co-author "Geology of Clay County, Mississippi", writing the section "Clay County Fossils: Midway Foraminifera and Ostracoda" which collects data form several hundred core samples throughout the Mississippi in 1942. This data was used to catalog the types of microfossils found in the clay; which is useful for geology because they can be used to date the clay layer where they are found allowing different layers to be correlated across long distances.

In 1943, during World War II, Kline became assistant petroleum analyst in the Chicago Office of Petroleum Administration. In November 1944 she accepted a position at the Illinois State Geological Survey as an Associate Geologist in the Oil and Gas section, where she worked for fourteen years until her death in 1959, making many contributions to the knowledge of geology. In 1946, she became a member of the AAPG.

== Applications of science ==
During her college days, Kline co-authored the publication titled "Revision of Alexander Winchell's Types of Brachiopods from the Middle Devonian Traverse Group of Rocks of Michigan." This publication was an integral piece of literature illustrating the role that women played in geology and showed that science and specifically geology was still evolving during her time. This work also highlights the connection to the concept that science is an ongoing process of understanding knowledge that develops alongside new discoveries and ideas. Historically speaking, many amendments have been made in the name of science to fit newly available data, as illustrated by Ehlers' and Kline's work in correcting previous interpretations of strata, using Steno's rules of stratigraphy. The consequence of which revamps the fossil index of the area, which in turn dictates to companies that are invested in drilling a new approach in looking for areas to commit resources, but also challenging the established thoughts on the history of the area. As Kline's career continued she became heavily involved within the field of petroleum geology and more importantly stratigraphy and fossil indexing. In 1942, while working as an associate professor and geologist at the University of Mississippi, Kline conducted an extensive summary of the lithology and distribution of Geological formations within the state. Nearing the end of her time at the University of Mississippi, Kline co-authored another important publication on describing and illustrating microfossils, a topic that had only briefly been explored, showing again that science is an evolving process, created through the assimilation of new discoveries and existing understanding.

== Contributions to science ==
Earning a doctorate in earth sciences was a considerable accomplishment considering that between 1920 and 1970 women obtained less than 4 percent of all doctorates awarded in this field. Furthering the advancement of how women were perceived in geology, a majority of Kline's career was heavily focused on fieldwork, which was uncommon for women at the time where even women professors advocated against office or laboratory work. Kline's contributions are highlighted by the fact that not only was she a woman in a field dominated by men at the time, she was also the only geologist for three companies at the same time, and eventually earned enough respect to author her own work, and eventually came to be the sole author on reports put out by the Illinois Geological Survey.

== Publications and professional works ==
- 'Revision of Alexander Winchell's Types of Brachiopods from the Middle Devonian Traverse Group of Rocks in Michigan', G.M. Ehlers and V. H. Kline, Museum of Paleontology, University of Michigan, Vol. IV, No. 10, Jan. 15 1934
- 'Stratigraphy of North Dakota' - Bulletin of American Association of Petroleum and Geology, Vol. 26, No.3, pp 336–79, March 1942
- 'Clay County Fossils - Midway Foraminifera and Ostracoda', V. Kline, Mississippi Geological Survey Bulletin 53, Pt. 3, 1943
- Series of annual reports (1944 - 1957) on oil and gas developments in Illinois
- Joint author with A. H. Bell printed in 'Transactions of the American Institute of Mining and Metallurgical Engineers', reprinted in the 'Illinois Petroleum Survey' for years 1944 - 1953
- Co-author with A. H. Bell when Illinois Geological Survey issued its annual report on the oil and gas industry in Illinois in its bulletin series, 1954 - 1957
- Principal author of monthly oil and gas drilling report, published by Illinois Geological Survey
