= Jerome Township, Michigan =

- Civil township
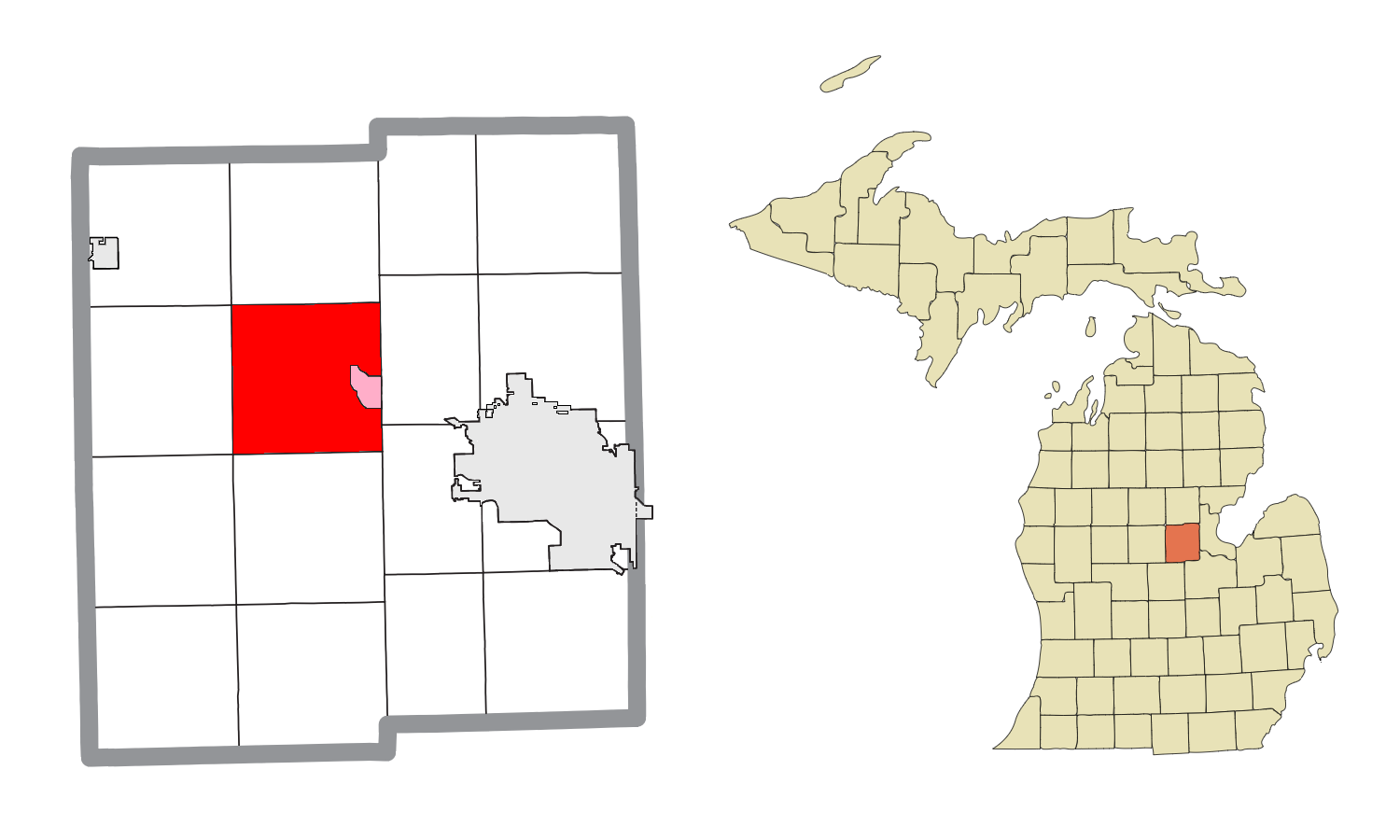
- Location within Midland County (red) and the administered village of Sanford (pink), and location within Michigan

- Location within Michigan Location within the United States
- Coordinates: 43°40′41″N 84°25′24″W
- Country: United States
- State: Michigan
- County: Midland
- Established: 1856

Government
  - Supervisor: . Steve Rice
  - Clerk: Gil Bernier

Area
  - Total: 35.7 sq mi (92 km^{2})
  - Land: 32.6 sq mi (84 km^{2})
  - Water: 3.0 sq mi (7.8 km^{2})
- Elevation: 650 ft (198 m)

Population (2020)
  - Total: 4,625
  - Density: 141.7/sq mi (54.7/km^{2})
- Time zone: UTC-5 (Eastern (EST))
  - Summer (DST): UTC-4 (EDT)
- ZIP Codes: 48657 (Sanford); 48618 (Coleman)
- Area code: 989
- FIPS code: 26-111-41760
- GNIS feature ID: 1626541
- Website: www.jerometownship.org

Jerome Township is a civil township of Midland County in the U.S. state of Michigan. The population was 4,625 at the 2020 census. Jerome Township is the most populous township in Midland County.

The village of Sanford is within the township.

== Geography ==
Jerome Township is in central Midland County, between the city of Midland, the county seat, to the east, and Coleman to the northwest. The village of Sanford is in the eastern part of the township. According to the U.S. Census Bureau, the township has a total area of 35.7 square miles (92 km^{2}), of which 32.6 square miles (84 km^{2}) are land and 3.0 square miles (7.8 km^{2}), or 8.52%, are water. The Tittabawassee River crosses the eastern part of the township from north to southeast.

== Demographics ==
Historical population
Census	Pop.	Note	%±
1860	114		—
1870	355		211.4%
1880	339		−4.5%
1890	509		50.1%
1900	533		4.7%
1910	515		−3.4%
1920	524		1.7%
1930	507		−3.2%
1940	770		51.9%
1950	1,625		111.0%
1960	2,588		59.3%
1970	3,154		21.9%
1980	4,171		32.2%
1990	4,470		7.2%
2000	4,888		9.4%
2010	4,796		−1.9%
2020	4,625		−3.6%
U.S. Decennial Census

As of the census of 2000, there were 4,888 people, 1,920 households, and 1,443 families residing in the township. The population density was 143.9 inhabitants per square mile (55.6/km^{2}). There were 2,091 housing units at an average density of 61.6 per square mile (23.8/km^{2}). The racial makeup of the township was 97.95% White, 0.12% African American, 0.49% Native American, 0.20% Asian, 0.31% from other races, and 0.92% from two or more races. Hispanic or Latino of any race were 0.94% of the population.

There were 1,920 households, out of which 30.7% had children under the age of 18 living with them, 64.4% were married couples living together, 7.0% had a female householder with no husband present, and 24.8% were non-families. 19.8% of all households were made up of individuals, and 7.0% had someone living alone who was 65 years of age or older. The average household size was 2.55 and the average family size was 2.91.

In the township the population was spread out, with 24.4% under the age of 18, 7.0% from 18 to 24, 29.1% from 25 to 44, 27.7% from 45 to 64, and 11.9% who were 65 years of age or older. The median age was 38 years. For every 100 females, there were 103.8 males. For every 100 females age 18 and over, there were 100.7 males.

The median income for a household in the township was $39,854, and the median income for a family was $45,234. Males had a median income of $35,069 versus $26,635 for females. The per capita income for the township was $19,328. About 4.4% of families and 6.7% of the population were below the poverty line, including 7.4% of those under age 18 and 4.7% of those age 65 or over.
