= Sanford, Michigan =

- Village
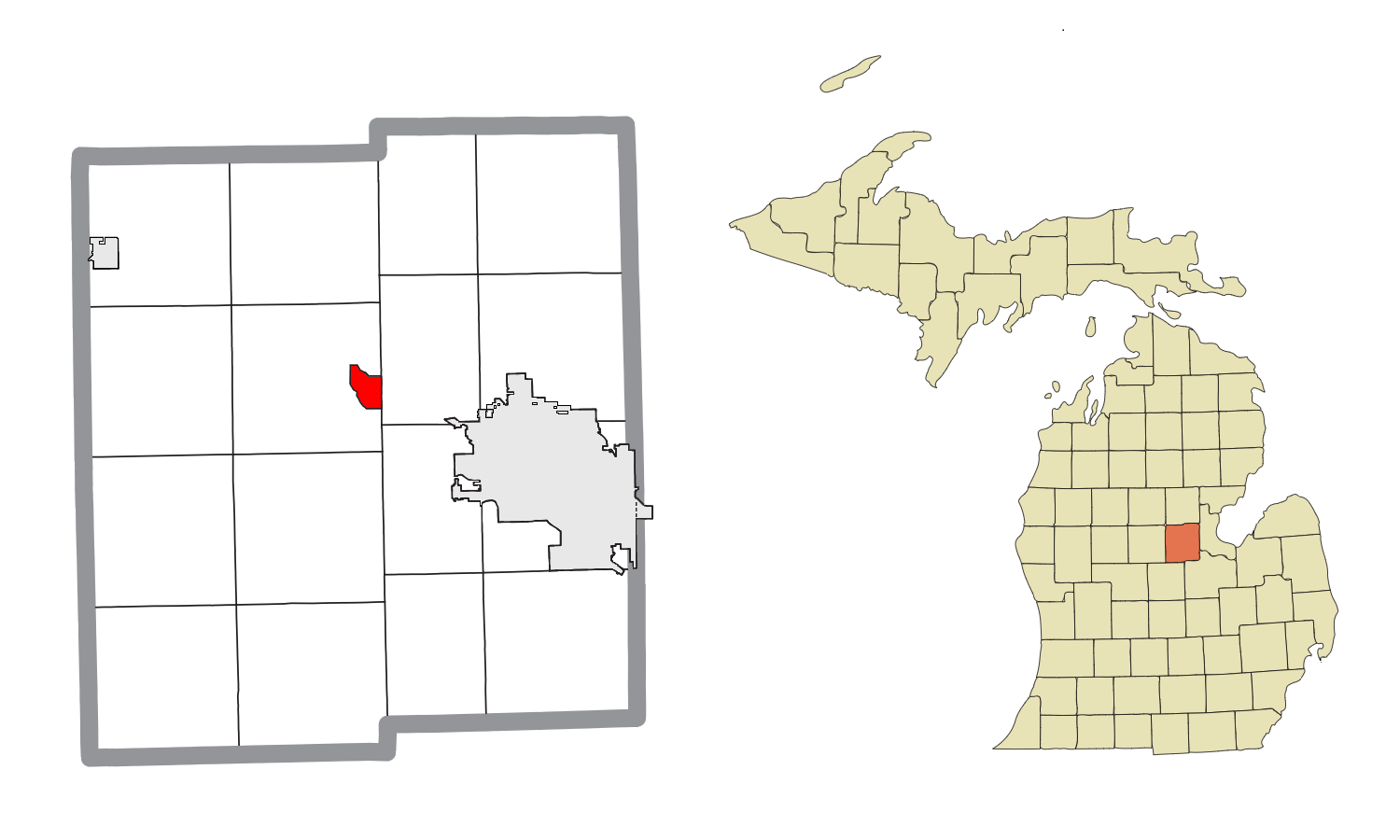
- Location within Midland County and the state of Michigan

- Location within Michigan Location within the United States
- Coordinates: 43°40′22″N 84°22′50″W
- Country: United States
- State: Michigan
- County: Midland
- Township: Jerome
- Settled: 1864
- Incorporated: 1963

Government
  - Type: Village council
  - President: Dolores Porte
  - Clerk: Roberta Thrush

Area
  - Total: 1.55 sq mi (4.01 km^{2})
  - Land: 1.27 sq mi (3.29 km^{2})
  - Water: 0.27 sq mi (0.71 km^{2})
- Elevation: 630 ft (192 m)

Population (2020)
  - Total: 813
  - Density: 639.2/sq mi (246.78/km^{2})
- Time zone: UTC-5 (Eastern (EST))
  - Summer (DST): UTC-4 (EDT)
- ZIP Code: 48657
- Area code: 989
- FIPS code: 26-71560
- GNIS feature ID: 0637235
- Website: villageofsanford.com

Sanford is a village in Midland County in the U.S. state of Michigan. The population was 813 at the 2020 census. The village is located within Jerome Township.

== History ==
In 1864, Charles Sanford of Madison County, New York, purchased 213 acres (0.86 km^{2}) of land where the village is now located, along with 1,000 acres (4.0 km^{2}) of pine land. The site was first known as the "Salt-Spring Reserve", and was the location of the first salt well in the state. Douglass Houghton, the state surveyor and geologist, supervised sinking the shaft of the well. Charles Sanford moved there in May 1864. He platted the village in 1870. Romig identifies Jay F. Hamilton as the first postmaster of "Sanfordville" on June 23, 1871, while the Portrait and biographical album of Midland county, Mich. lists Phineas Hamilton as the first postmaster. The name was shortened to "Sanford" on July 13, 1871. Also in 1871, the Pere Marquette Railroad built a station in Sanford.

In 1963, residents of Sanford voted to incorporate as a village. In 1982, Sanford voters approved the repeal of its incorporation, but a Michigan court overturned the election results on the grounds that it should have been presented as one proposal instead of two.

On May 19, 2020, the Sanford Dam and Edenville Dam on the Tittabawassee River collapsed, forcing the evacuation of the village and largely destroying its downtown.

== Geography ==
Sanford is in central Midland County, on the eastern side of Jerome Township. It is 8 miles (13 km) northwest of Midland, the county seat, and 12 miles (19 km) southeast of Coleman. U.S. Route 10, a four-lane freeway, passes through the north side of the village, connecting Midland and Coleman. M-30 (Michigan highway) runs along the eastern edge of the village, leading south 20 miles (32 km) to Merrill and north 48 miles (77 km) to West Branch.

According to the U.S. Census Bureau, the village of Sanford has a total area of 1.55 square miles (4.01 km^{2}), of which 1.27 square miles (3.29 km^{2}) are land and 0.28 square miles (0.73 km^{2}), or 17.8%, are water. The village sits along the Tittabawassee River at what until 2020 was the south end of Sanford Lake, an impoundment on the river.

== Demographics ==
Historical population
Census	Pop.	Note	%±
1970	818		—
1980	864		5.6%
1990	889		2.9%
2000	943		6.1%
2010	859		−8.9%
2020	813		−5.4%
U.S. Decennial Census

=== 2010 census ===
As of the census of 2010, there were 859 people, 369 households, and 247 families residing in the village. The population density was 676.4 inhabitants per square mile (261.2/km^{2}). There were 410 housing units at an average density of 322.8 per square mile (124.6/km^{2}). The racial makeup of the village was 97.6% White, 0.1% African American, 0.6% Native American, 0.7% Asian, 0.5% from other races, and 0.6% from two or more races. Hispanic or Latino of any race were 2.6% of the population.

There were 369 households, of which 26.8% had children under the age of 18 living with them, 48.8% were married couples living together, 11.7% had a female householder with no husband present, 6.5% had a male householder with no wife present, and 33.1% were non-families. 30.1% of all households were made up of individuals, and 11.7% had someone living alone who was 65 years of age or older. The average household size was 2.33 and the average family size was 2.85.

The median age in the village was 43.6 years. 21.4% of residents were under the age of 18; 7.8% were between the ages of 18 and 24; 23.1% were from 25 to 44; 31.5% were from 45 to 64; and 16.2% were 65 years of age or older. The gender makeup of the village was 48.3% male and 51.7% female.

=== 2000 census ===
As of the census of 2000, there were 943 people, 382 households, and 260 families residing in the village. The population density was 742.1 inhabitants per square mile (286.5/km^{2}). There were 407 housing units at an average density of 320.3 per square mile (123.7/km^{2}). The racial makeup of the village was 98.20% White, 0.21% African American, 0.11% Native American, 0.64% from other races, and 0.85% from two or more races. Hispanic or Latino of any race were 1.38% of the population.

There were 382 households, out of which 31.4% had children under the age of 18 living with them, 59.7% were married couples living together, 7.1% had a female householder with no husband present, and 31.9% were non-families. 25.9% of all households were made up of individuals, and 9.2% had someone living alone who was 65 years of age or older. The average household size was 2.47 and the average family size was 3.02.

In the village, the population was spread out, with 24.9% under the age of 18, 5.5% from 18 to 24, 29.9% from 25 to 44, 25.3% from 45 to 64, and 14.3% who were 65 years of age or older. The median age was 39 years. For every 100 females, there were 96.0 males. For every 100 females age 18 and over, there were 92.4 males.

The median income for a household in the village was $39,063, and the median income for a family was $48,083. Males had a median income of $33,036 versus $28,500 for females. The per capita income for the village was $20,599. About 4.4% of families and 8.7% of the population were below the poverty line, including 6.4% of those under age 18 and 1.0% of those age 65 or over.

== Sources ==
- Romig, Walter, L.H.D. Michigan Place Names. Detroit: Wayne State University Press, 1986
- Portrait and biographical album of Midland county, Mich. Evansville, Ind.:Unigraphic, 1976.
