= Sanford Dam (Michigan) =

Dam in Midland county, Michigan, United States

- Location within the state of Michigan
- Location: Midland county, Michigan, U.S.
- Coordinates: 43°48′51″N 84°22′35″W
- Purpose: Power, recreation
- Status: inactive
- Opening date: 1926; 100 years ago
- Demolition date: 2020; 6 years ago (destroyed by flood)

Dam and spillways
- Type of dam: embankment
- Impounds: Tittabawassee River
- Height: 40 ft (12 m)
- Length: 6,380 ft (1,940 m)

Reservoir
- Creates: Sanford Lake
- Total capacity: 15,000 acre-feet (19,000,000 m^{3})
- Surface area: 1,250 acres (5.1 km^{2})
- Normal elevation: 630 ft (192 m)

Power Station
- Installed capacity: 4.8mW

Sanford Dam was an earthen embankment dam on the Tittabawassee River in Mid Michigan, United States, forming Sanford Lake. The dam was about 1/2 mile (0.80 km) east of Sanford, on the eastern border of Jerome Township in Midland County. Its height was 40 feet (12 m), the length was 6,380 feet (1,940 m) at its crest.

The dam was built in 1925 for hydroelectric power, flood control and recreation. The dam was equipped with two 2.4 MW turbines capable of generating 4.8 MW of electricity in total.

In May 2020, following heavy rains, the Edenville Dam breached and the Sanford Dam downstream overflowed, which caused major flooding in Midland County, including the city of Midland.

== History ==
The dam was built in 1925 by Frank Isaac Wixom, who also constructed the Edenville Dam. Wixom used to own a circus before he built the dam.

The dam is privately owned and operated by Boyce Hydro Power, a company based in Edenville, which also owned three other hydroelectric facilities on the Tittabawassee: the Secord, Smallwood, and Edenville Dams.

=== Safety and lake level disputes ===
In an exercise of a rarely used legal authority, the Federal Energy Regulatory Commission (FERC) terminated Boyce Hydro Power's license in 2018, because of its "inability to pass the Probable Maximum Flood (PMF)", as well as seven other failures. FERC was concerned that "the dam may not have the ability to pass enough water, if a severe flood were to hit, among other issues and violations".

Following the commission's 2018 license revocation, the Michigan Department of Environment, Great Lakes, and Energy (EGLE) took oversight of the dam. EGLE determined that the dam was structurally sound. Edenville and the other former Boyce dams were taken over in 2019 by the Four Lakes Task Force (FLTF), a county delegated authority, with title to transfer in early 2022. The State of Michigan appropriated $5 million for the purchase. The FLTF operates under the Four Lakes Assessment District in Michigan, created in May 2019 by Judge Stephen Carras. In 2019, Michigan's 42nd Circuit Court was involved in determining if only the lakefront owners or all area residents would pay tax to the Four Lakes Assessment District.

In October 2018, and again in mid-November 2019, the dam's operator lowered the water level, in what it called a safety move. It said it had requested a permit to lower the level from Michigan's EGLE, a permit that was not issued. The operator said it acted "due to concern for the safety of its operators and the downstream community", and went on to sue EGLE in federal court, alleging "its safety concerns were paramount".

In December 2019, FERC issued a permit to investigate expanding the hydropower plant with a second powerhouse containing one 1.2 MW turbine-generator unit for a total of 6 MW.

The dam's operator said it began to raise the lake's water level in April 2020, under threat of being sued by EGLE, and that it reached "normal pond level" in the first week of May 2020. Michigan Attorney General Dana Nessel confirmed EGLE had directed the operator to raise the water level, stating: "Michigan EGLE directed Boyce to follow the court-ordered lake level requirements", but challenged that the operator had lowered it for safety reasons.

In April 2020, EGLE sued Boyce, alleging it had lowered the water level without permission in 2018 and 2019, killing thousands of freshwater mussels.

In October 2022, however, a federal judge accepted as basic facts that Boyce had conducted what the Michigan Attorney General called a "propaganda" campaign trying to blame the State of Michigan for keeping water levels high, when in fact, Boyce had continually touted the structural safety of the Edenville Dam.

=== Dam failure ===
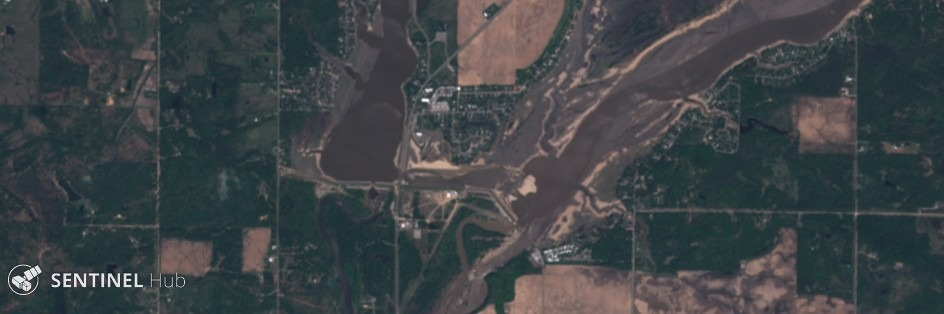
Copernicus Programme image of the dam after failure, showing the new river channel east of the original spillway

On May 19, 2020, at 17:46 EDT heavy rainfall pushed inflows far beyond design capacity and the east embankment of Edenville Dam gave way. Immediate, mandatory evacuations were ordered for residents of Edenville and nearby Sanford. Roughly 10 miles (16 km) downstream the impounded water overtopped—but did not breach—the Sanford Dam, forcing the evacuation of much of Midland another six miles (9.7 km) downstream.

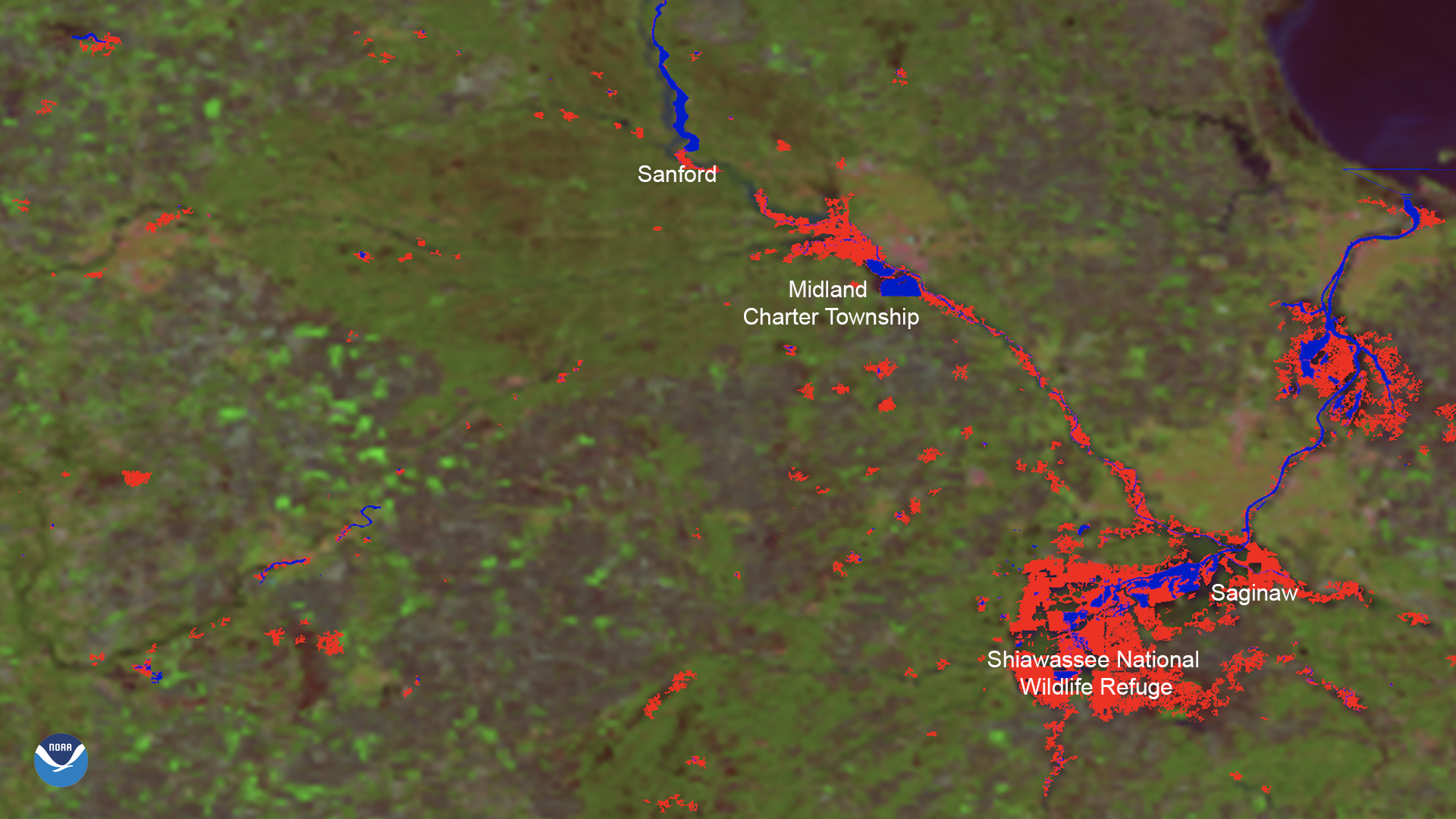
NOAA Satellite image of the flooding downriver including Midland and Saginaw

Michigan Governor Gretchen Whitmer declared a state of emergency that evening and directed state regulators to open an investigation into Boyce Hydro, the dam's private owner. More than 10 000 people eventually fled their homes; officials also urged evacuees to observe social‑distancing rules because the failure occurred during the COVID‑19 pandemic.

The Tittabawassee River crested at 35.05 feet (10.68 m) during the night of May 20, inundating eastern Midland and severely damaging the village of Sanford. Satellite imagery released two days later showed a new river channel carved around the failed spillway. Although floodwater surrounded parts of the Dow Chemical complex in Midland, the company reported no serious damage to critical infrastructure. No fatalities or serious injuries were recorded.

==== Lawsuits ====
Within days of the disaster three class‑action lawsuits were filed; plaintiffs alleged negligence by both Boyce Hydro and EGLE. On September 8, 2023, the Michigan Court of Appeals allowed those actions to proceed, citing a 2020 precedent stemming from the Flint water crisis. Bryce Hydro declared bankruptcy to avoid financial consequences.

==== Forensic report ====
FERC convened an independent forensic team (IFT) to determine the technical cause of the breach. The team's final report (May 4, 2022) concluded that the failure was "foreseeable and preventable". It traced the breach to loose sands placed in the 1920s embankment, which became saturated and underwent static liquefaction; the downstream face had also been built steeper than safety criteria allowed. The IFT emphasised that design errors, construction deviations and decades of regulatory oversights collectively doomed the structure long before 2020.^{(pp. S‑4 – S‑5)} Media coverage summarised the report as proof that the disaster was avoidable.

==== Repair ====
In March 2022 the state enacted a $4.8 billion infrastructure package that earmarked funds for reconstructing the four dams overseen by the FLTF. Early planning redirected the Tittabawassee back through the original spillway, causing the temporary Edenville Falls—created in the breach channel—to dry up.

In May 2023 David Kepler, president of the FLTF announced that they expected all the lakes would be restored in 2025. In 2022 the 30 projects in the recovery phase for all four lakes were completed. Debris points were removed including boat lifts and docks, trees, wood, milled and miscellaneous wood, boats and man-made items. More than one thousand were removed from Sanford Lake and 1,300 from Wixom Lake. Over 10,634 feet (3,241.2 m) of shoreland was protected utilizing 48,335 tons of riprap. Much has been done, but issues still must be resolved.

==== Midland roads and bridges ====
The Midland County Road Commission estimated flood damage to bridges and pavement at about $17 million.
