= Robert B. Carter =

- Born: 1959 (age 66–67); Taiwan
- Education: University of Florida; University of South Florida
- Awards: Fast Company’s Most Creative People in Business, Fortune magazine’s Executive Dream Team, and Information Week’s Chief of the Year Award

Robert B. Carter is the former executive vice president and chief information officer for the FedEx Corporation.

Carter was born in Taiwan in 1959 and he grew up in Florida. He received his Bachelor of Science degree in computer and information science from the University of Florida in 1981. In addition, he earned a master's in business administration from the University of South Florida in 1990.

Carter joined FedEx in 1993 and has nearly 40 years of systems development and implementation experience. In addition, Carter is a member of the New York Life board of directors and the Pilot Flying J board of directors. As of September 2016, he is reported to own approximately 48 thousand FedEx shares worth US$10 million.
