= Coleman, Michigan =

- City
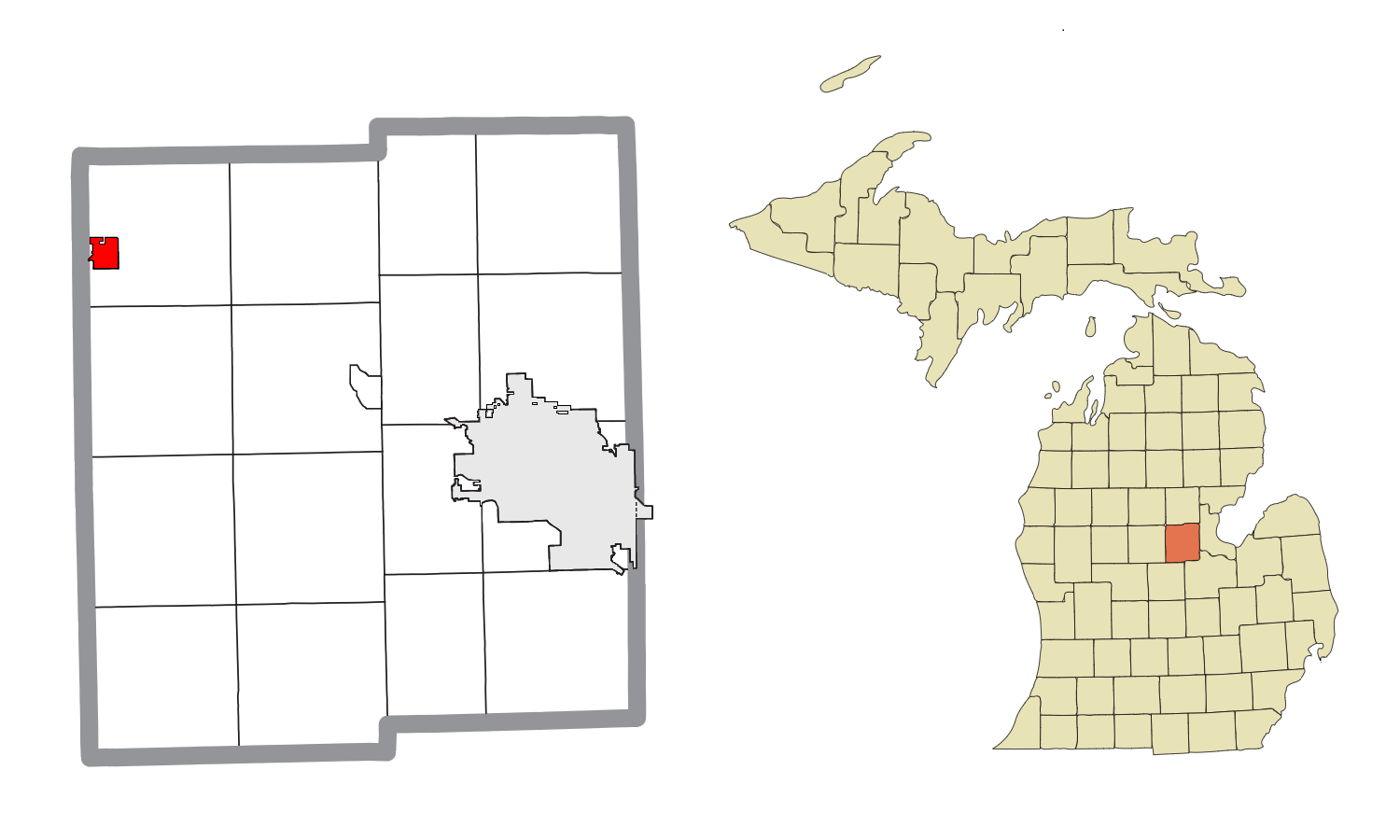
- Location within Midland County and the state of Michigan

- Location within Michigan Location within the United States
- Coordinates: 43°45′24″N 84°35′09″W
- Country: United States
- State: Michigan
- County: Midland
- Settled: 1868
- Incorporated: 1887 (village); 1905 (city)

Government
  - Type: Mayor–council
  - Mayor: Steve Miller
  - Mayor pro tem: Frank Kroll

Area
  - Total: 1.26 sq mi (3.26 km^{2})
  - Land: 1.25 sq mi (3.23 km^{2})
  - Water: 0.012 sq mi (0.03 km^{2})
- Elevation: 758 ft (231 m)

Population (2020)
  - Total: 1,262
  - Density: 1,012/sq mi (390.7/km^{2})
- Time zone: UTC-5 (Eastern (EST))
  - Summer (DST): UTC-4 (EDT)
- ZIP Code: 48618
- Area code: 989
- FIPS code: 26-17100
- GNIS feature ID: 0623595
- Website: www.cityofcoleman.org

Coleman is a city in Midland County of the U.S. state of Michigan. The population was 1,262 at the 2020 census.

== History ==
Coleman began with the building of a sawmill in 1870. The following year a station of the Pere Marquette Railroad was opened. It was incorporated as a village in 1887 and as a city in 1905.

== Geography ==
Coleman is in northwestern Midland County, 20 miles (32 km) northwest of Midland, the county seat, and 10 miles (16 km) southeast of Clare. U.S. Route 10, a four-lane-freeway, runs along the northern border of the city, with access from Exit 103 (North Coleman Road).

According to the U.S. Census Bureau, the city has a total area of 1.27 square miles (3.29 km^{2}), of which 1.26 square miles (3.26 km^{2}) are land and 0.01 square miles (0.03 km^{2}) are water.

== Economy ==
=== Robinson Industries ===
The company is a manufacturer of thermoformed plastics products. The company was founded in 1947, initially making refrigerator door slabs. Coolers, canoes and ice buckets were added before they created reusable plastic pallets in the 1960s for use in the auto industry. They are one of the biggest employers in Coleman, with almost 200 employees.

=== Huhtamaki Plastics ===
The company is a manufacturer of plastic cups, fluted ice cream cups, and plates, bowls and cups sold in retail stores under the Chinet brand. They are one of the biggest employers in Coleman, with 257 employees.

== Demographics ==
Historical population
Census	Pop.	Note	%±
1880	111		—
1890	540		386.5%
1900	1,014		87.8%
1910	909		−10.4%
1920	769		−15.4%
1930	667		−13.3%
1940	722		8.2%
1950	1,024		41.8%
1960	1,264		23.4%
1970	1,295		2.5%
1980	1,429		10.3%
1990	1,237		−13.4%
2000	1,296		4.8%
2010	1,243		−4.1%
2020	1,262		1.5%
U.S. Decennial Census

=== 2010 Census ===
As of the census of 2010, there were 1,243 people, 533 households, and 327 families residing in the city. The population density was 986.5 inhabitants per square mile (380.9/km^{2}). There were 640 housing units at an average density of 507.9 per square mile (196.1/km^{2}). The racial makeup of the city was 96.1% White, 0.7% African American, 0.3% Native American, 0.2% Asian, 0.1% Pacific Islander, 0.2% from other races, and 2.5% from two or more races. Hispanic or Latino of any race were 3.1% of the population.

There were 533 households, of which 31.0% had children under the age of 18 living with them, 41.7% were married couples living together, 14.1% had a female householder with no husband present, 5.6% had a male householder with no wife present, and 38.6% were non-families. 33.8% of all households were made up of individuals, and 13.9% had someone living alone who was 65 years of age or older. The average household size was 2.33 and the average family size was 2.99.

The median age in the city was 36.4 years. Of residents, 26.5% were under the age of 18; 8.8% were between the ages of 18 and 24; 24% were from 25 to 44; 23.3% were from 45 to 64; and 17.3% were 65 years of age or older. The gender makeup of the city was 47.9% male and 52.1% female.

=== 2000 Census ===
As of the census of 2000, there were 1,296 people, 539 households, and 336 families residing in the city. The population density was 1,151.7 inhabitants per square mile (444.7/km^{2}). There were 582 housing units at an average density of 517.2 per square mile (199.7/km^{2}). The racial makeup of the city was 96.91% White, 0.08% African American, 1.47% Native American, 0.69% from other races, and 0.85% from two or more races. Hispanic or Latino of any race were 1.23% of the population.

There were 539 households, out of which 31.7% had children under the age of 18 living with them, 43.0% were married couples living together, 15.2% had a female householder with no husband present, and 37.5% were non-families. 31.7% of all households were made up of individuals, and 14.7% had someone living alone who was 65 years of age or older. The average household size was 2.40 and the average family size was 3.00.

In the city, the population was spread out, with 27.8% under the age of 18, 10.1% from 18 to 24, 29.6% from 25 to 44, 17.7% from 45 to 64, and 14.8% who were 65 years of age or older. The median age was 34 years. For every 100 females, there were 88.6 males. For every 100 females age 18 and over, there were 82.1 males.

The median income for a household in the city was $28,750, and the median income for a family was $36,544. Males had a median income of $29,943 versus $21,719 for females. The per capita income for the city was $15,921. About 13.1% of families and 17.0% of the population were below the poverty line, including 24.8% of those under age 18 and 7.5% of those age 65 or over.

==== Highways ====
- US 10

== Notable people ==
- Virginia Harriett Kline (1910–1959), geologist, stratigrapher, and librarian; born in Coleman
- Vern Ruhle (1951-2007), Major League Baseball pitcher; born in Coleman
