= Chinet =

American paper goods company

- Industry: Paper products
- Founded: 1930s
- Headquarters: De Soto, Kansas
- Owner: Huhtamäki
- Website: www.mychinet.com

Chinet is an American paper goods company established in the 1930s that produces disposable plates, bowls, napkins, and plastic cups. Owned by Huhtamaki of Espoo, Finland, its North American regional headquarters is in De Soto, Kansas.

Chinet began offering compostable plate products in 2013.

Huhtamaki has manufacturing facilities in the following locations:

- Hammond, Indiana
- Coleman, Michigan
- Marion, Indiana
- Franklin, Ohio
- New Vienna, Ohio
- Batavia, Ohio
- Hopkinsville, Kentucky
- De Soto, Kansas
- Paris, Texas
- Goodyear, Arizona
- Los Angeles, California
- Sacramento, California
- Fulton, New York
- Waterville, Maine
- Andalusia, Alabama
- Zellwood, Florida
