= Sanford Lake =

Lake in Midland County, Michigan, United States of America

- Location within the state of Michigan
- Location: Sanford, Midland County, Michigan
- Coordinates: 43°42′N 84°23′W
- Type: Reservoir
- Primary inflows: Tittabawassee River
- Primary outflows: Tittabawassee River
- Catchment area: 20,971 acres (8,487 ha)
- First flooded: 1925
- Max. length: 6 mi (9.7 km)
- Max. width: 0.5 mi (0.80 km)
- Surface area: 1,429 acres (578 ha)
- Average depth: 9.3 ft (2.8 m)
- Max. depth: 26 ft (7.9 m)
- Water volume: 13,899 acre⋅ft (17,144,000 m^{3})
- Shore length^{1}: 34.5 mi (55.5 km)
- Surface elevation: 631 ft (192 m)
- Frozen: Winter
- Settlements: Sanford
- ^{1} Shore length is not a well-defined measure.

Sanford Lake is a temporarily dry, man-made reservoir located near the village of Sanford in Midland County, Michigan. First flooded in 1925, it drained when the failure of the Sanford Dam restored the natural flow of the Tittabawassee River in May 2020. The dam, originally built for flood control and the production of hydroelectric power, is owned and operated by the Four Lakes Task Force, a property owners' group that was established by the Midland and Gladwin County boards of commissioners to oversee the dams and the impoundment lakes created by them, who took over ownership as a condition of the settlement agreement that resulted from the condemnation proceedings with former dam owner, Boyce Hydro, LLC. Reconstruction of the dam is scheduled to be completed in early 2026, at which point the reservoir will be refilled.

== About ==
The main body of the lake stretched for about 6 miles (10 km) north of the dam; since the collapse the water remains deep enough for small boat navigation up past the town of Edenville, 10 miles (16 km) north of the dam. The lake was slightly over half a mile wide at its widest point. A survey by the Michigan DNR measured the main body of the lake at 1,250 acres (5.1 km^{2}). According to the Sanford Lake Improvement Board website maintained by Midland County, the lake has a surface area of 1,499 acres (6.07 km^{2}) and a shoreline length of 34.5 miles (55.5 km). In May 2020, the Sanford Dam, as well as the Edenville Dam to the north, failed following rain and neglect of the dams. This resulted in the flooding of Sanford, Midland, Saginaw, and other surrounding areas.

== Access ==
Sanford Lake was a recreation spot for the county and surrounding counties. There were two public access points to the lake and many private community access points. Before 2020, pontoon boats, personal watercraft, sport fishermen, and swimmers used the lake in the summer.

Sanford Lake Park is located on the west side of the former lake near the dam. This park, maintained by Midland County, had boat ramps, a sandy beach area with volleyball and swimming, pull-up parking for boats and jet-skis, picnic pavilions, playgrounds, and a seasonal concession stand. Access was available by car or boat with no fee charged. As of May 2023, the park remained closed for construction.

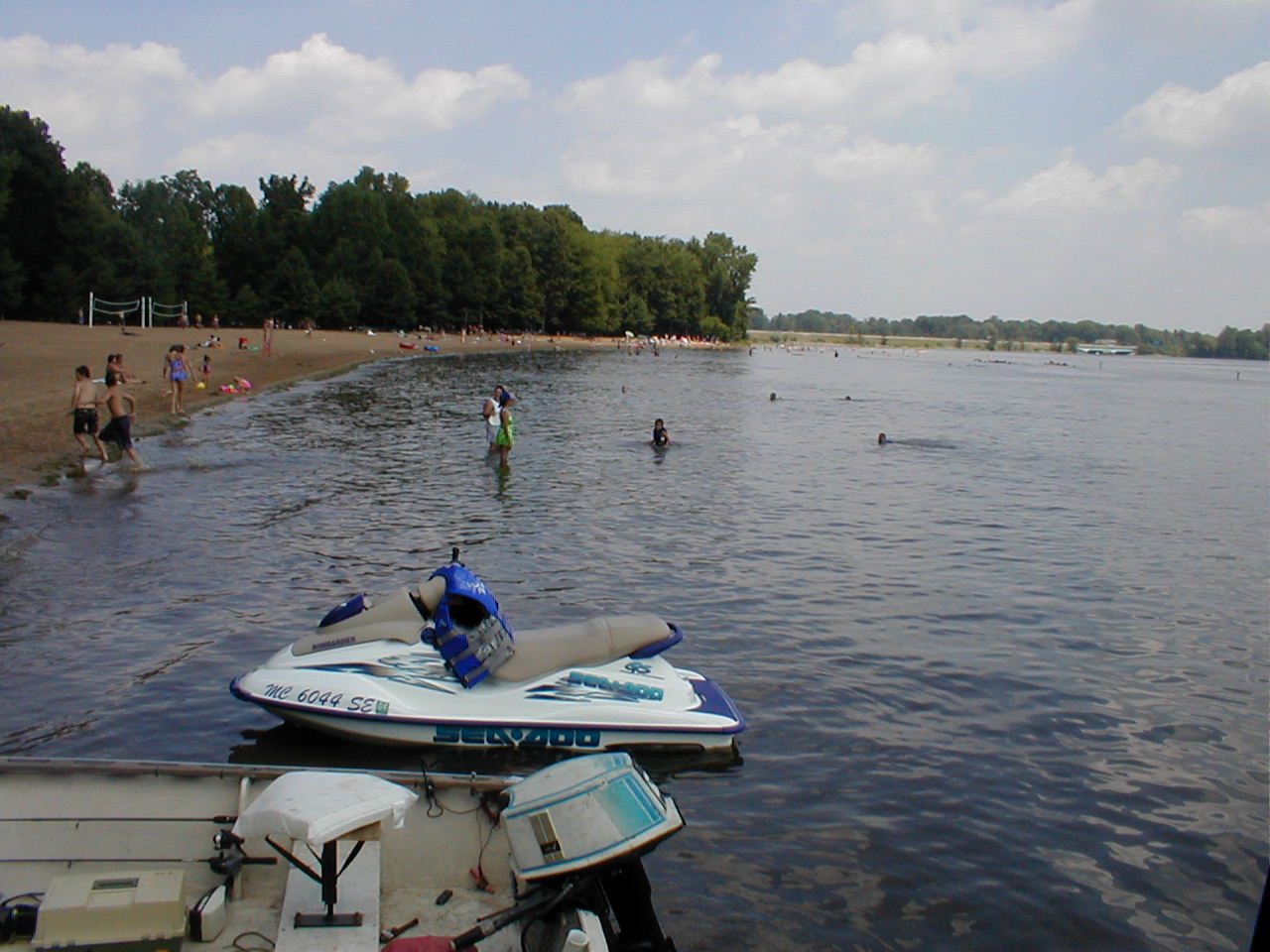
Sanford Lake Park

== Lake characteristics ==
As a reservoir with a predominantly muddy bottom, turbidity was higher than the average natural lake in Michigan. The introduction of Zebra mussels in the 1990s improved water clarity, but led to significant weed growth throughout the shallow portions of the lake. Weed control programs were attempted over the years with varying degrees of success.

Sanford Lake had a range of Michigan species: bluegill, rock bass, perch, calicos, northern pike, crappie, catfish, walleye, smallmouth bass, largemouth bass, musky, suckers, and carp. The DNR stocked 65,000 walleye off the Sanford Lake Marina ramp in the spring of 2006. Several bass fishing competitions took place during the year, as well as a catfish derby.

What used to be the shoreline is mostly developed with single-family homes. Many of these homes are located in small neighborhood communities which maintained private boat launch sites, picnic areas, and lake access for non-lakefront property owners. The area of the lake farther north was lined with some wetlands and wilderness areas mixed with housing. There was one small marina on the east shore of the lake (Sanford Lake Marina).

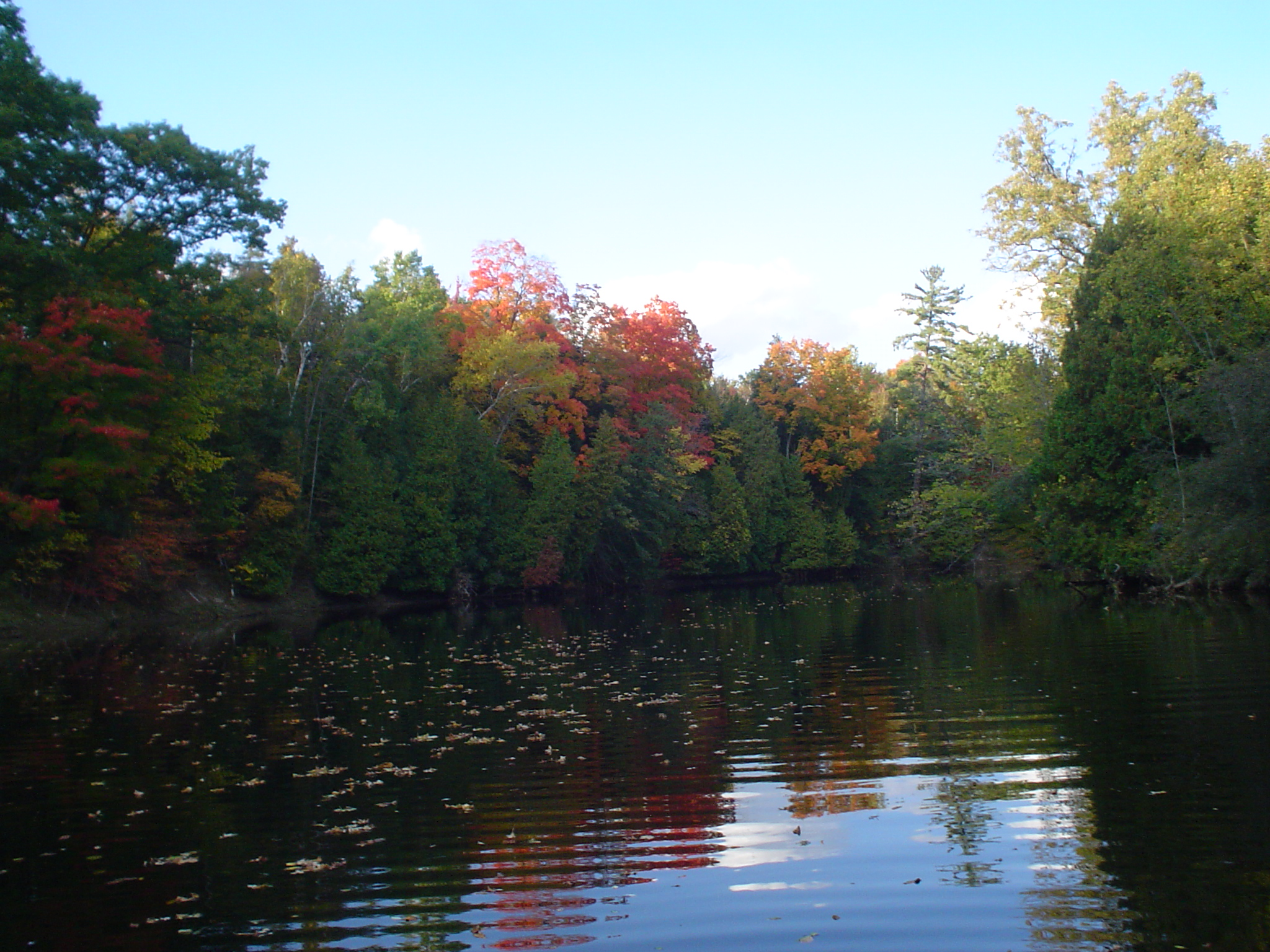
Up the river on Sanford Lake

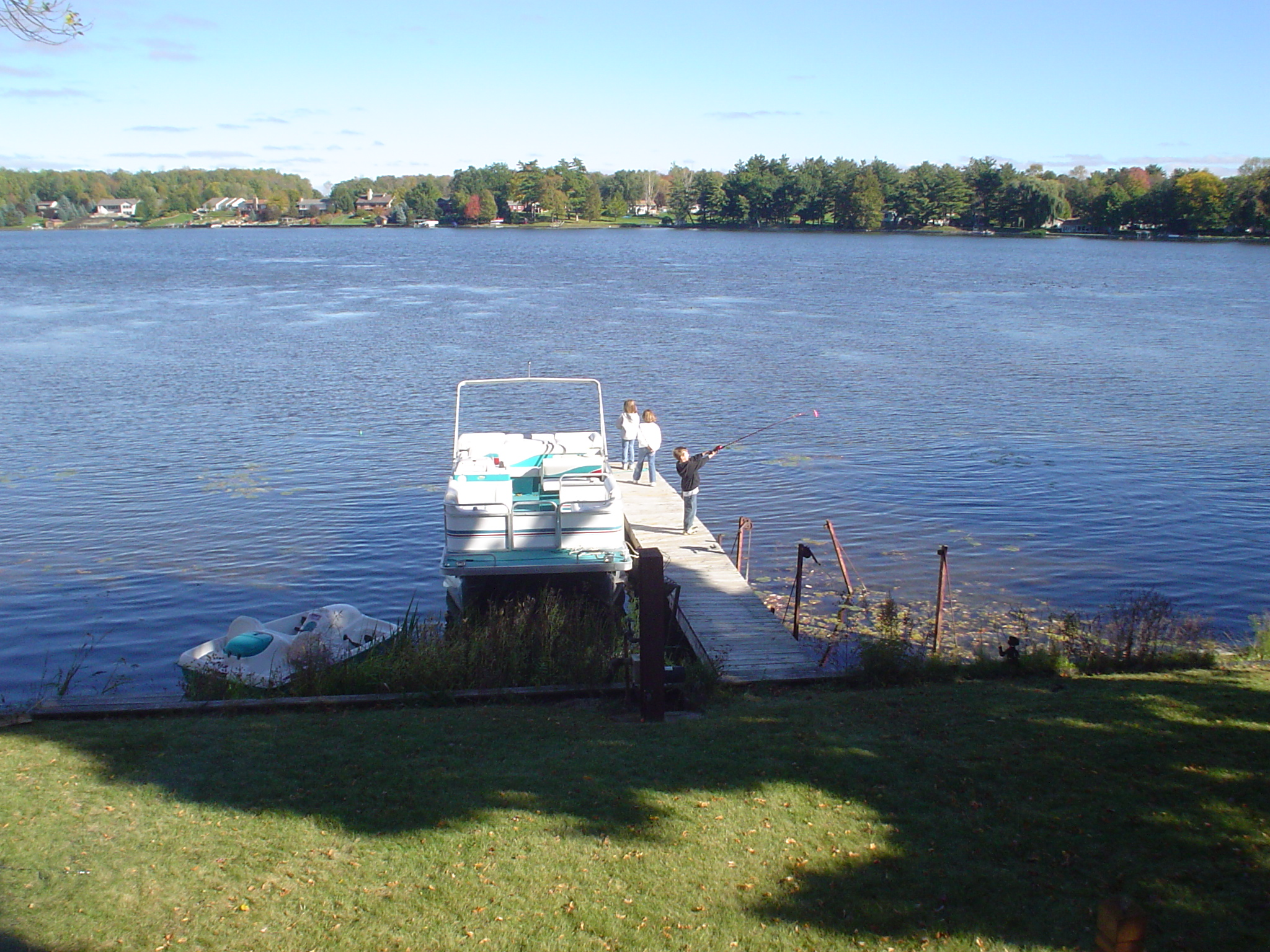
Dock fishing at Verity Shores

== 2020 flood ==
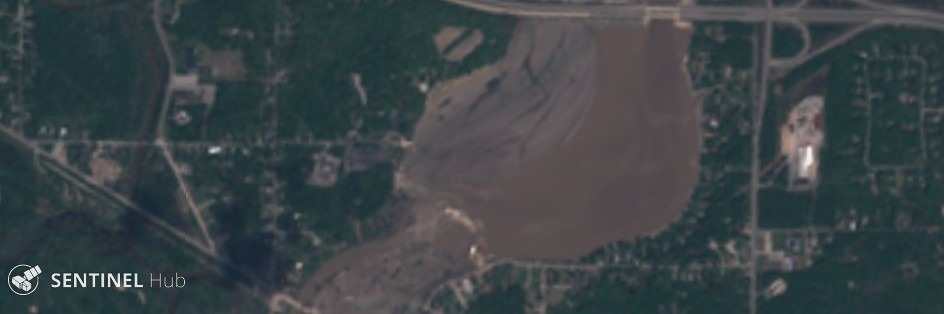
Copernicus Programme image of the dam after the flood.

Following a period of heavy rain, the Edenville Dam 11 miles (18 km) upstream overtopped and failed on May 19, 2020. The breach of the Edenville Dam in two areas of the levee caused more water to be released into the Tittabawassee River which feeds into Sanford Lake. The floodwaters quickly overran Sanford Dam, washing out its fuse plug and escaping around the sides of the dam, eventually leading to the failure of the dam.

Sanford Dam was built in 1925 and had received a "fair" condition rating by the state. The 1924 Edenville Dam had received a "poor" rating, though it had been deemed worthy of another hydroelectric generator by the state. At the time of the failure, both dams were in the process of being sold to the Four Lakes Task Force (FLTF), a 'delegated authority' created by a resolution between Midland and Gladwin counties. On May 26, 2020, the FLTF announced that they were halting the acquisition of the Boyce Hydro properties under the terms and conditions negotiated in 2019, and would seek other private and public sources of funding for the eventual purchase. On December 7, 2020, Four Lakes Task Force was granted a motion to acquire the dams through condemnation, also known as eminent domain. The Dams are now being rebuilt.
