= Impact of the COVID-19 pandemic on prisons =

Impact of COVID-19

There have been outbreaks of COVID-19 reported in prisons and jails around the world, with the housing density and population turnover of many prisons contributing to an increased risk of contracting the virus compared to the general population. Prison crowding and lack of sanitation measures contribute to the risk of contracting diseases in prisons and jails. As a mitigation measure, several jurisdictions have released prisoners to reduce density and attempt to reduce the spread of the illness. There have also been protests among prisoners, riots and prison breaks in multiple countries in response to prisoner anger over their risk of contracting illness in prison conditions. Before the COVID-19 pandemic, health services within prisons had issues providing adequate care for incarcerated people, and this has only been exacerbated by the impacts of COVID-19. Minority groups within the prison system have been disproportionately affected by the COVID-19 pandemic.

== Hazard controls ==
According to the U.S. Centers for Disease Control and Prevention, prevention and management strategies should be implemented in correctional and detention facilities to reduce the burden of COVID-19. Some prevention strategies include symptom screening at entrances, avoiding overcrowding, staggering meal and recreation times, face coverings, signage, and training. It recommends that info-sharing systems be developed to manage confirmed and suspected cases, isolate those potentially infected, and offer flexible sick leave policies for staff members.

== Transition to the Endemic Phase (2023-2025) ==
Jurisdictions have transitioned from emergency COVID-19 protocols to permanent health management.

=== Vaccination Integration ===
By 2024, COVID-19 vaccination in correctional facilities transitioned from emergency mass-immunization campaigns to a routine clinical service. Many jurisdictions integrated COVID-19 boosters into standard intake protocols and annual preventive health schedules, similar to influenza vaccinations. Research in US state prisons estimated an average incarcerated vaccination rate of approximately 54% as of early 2025.

=== Normalization of Care ===
The "normalization' of COVID-19 management has seen the removal of most universal masking and social distancing mandates, which were deemed impractical for long-term enforcement in carceral environments. Facilities have largely shifted from broad lockdowns to symptomatic testing the use of dedicated intake housing to screen for various infectious diseases simultaneously.

=== Virtual Visitation ===
Initially adopted as a temporary measure during total facility lockdowns, virtual visitation has become a permanent feature of modern prison systems. Many prisons have maintained video-conferencing kiosks as a supplement to, and in some cases, a partial replacement for, in-person visits.

== By country (2020-2022) ==
=== Afghanistan ===
The Afghan government released 10,000 prisoners on March 26, 2020. They were mostly women, young people, the critically ill, and inmates over 55 years of age.

=== Australia ===
On March 16, 2020, the Australian government declared that COVID-19 was a public health emergency. It also cancelled all visits to the Alexander Maconochie prison starting on March 23. ACT Corrective Services commissioner Jon Peach stated that, as a result, there would be "increased access to telephones" for prisoners to keep in touch with their families.

=== Bahrain ===
In May 2021, Bahrain reported a spike in its daily cases of COVID-19 to approximately 3000. By June 2021, Bahrain was reported to have been experiencing a third wave of the coronavirus pandemic, said to be 'its biggest wave of infections' so far. Despite the uncontrolled spread of the virus, the Bahraini government kept political prisoners imprisoned in the allegedly overcrowded, notorious Jau prison. Sadeq AbdAli AlAsfoor, one of the prisoners was arrested in 2012 at the age of 20 and has since been inside the prison, was subjected to torture and lack of medical care or healthy meals.

=== Belarus ===
As prisons filled with 30,000 protesters following the 2020 Belarusian presidential election, virus cases in prisons also increased. Cells were overcrowded, lacked ventilation, and lacked basic amenities and medical treatment. Guards were accused of deliberately allowing the virus to run lose for political reasons. Authorities have not released the number of prisoners with COVID-19, but rights activists say that thousands of protesters tested positive after they were detained.

=== Brazil ===
Hundreds of prisoners, who work outside the prison during the day, escaped from four prisons in São Paulo state after visitors were restricted and Easter furloughs were cancelled due to health concerns.

=== China ===
The virus spread to at least four prisons in China.

=== Colombia ===
On March 22, 2020, 23 prisoners were killed and 83 injured during a prison riot in La Modelo in Bogota, which erupted over fears over the spreading of COVID-19 through prison walls. Prisoners across the country have been protesting against the poor health services ever since the outbreak of COVID-19.

The government planned to release about 10,000 prisoners on the weekend of 4–5 April 2020. The release did not apply to individuals who have been convicted of sexual offenses against minors, corruption, or crimes against humanity.

=== Czech Republic ===
Due to the coronavirus, on March 13, the Czech government passed Resolution No. 204/2020 Coll, which banned family members from visiting relatives in prisons and jails. Defense attorneys were exempted from the bans.

=== El Salvador ===
Following an outbreak of alleged gang violence in late April 2020 that killed 77 people, President Nayib Bukele imposed a lockdown on imprisoned gang members from 26 April. As part of the crackdown, gang members were confined in crowded cells for 23 hours a day; cells were barricaded with plywood and metal sheets to block sunlight; mobile and wifi signals were blocked, and rival gang members were mixed together. Human Rights Watch Americas director José Miguel Vivanco condemned the treatment of prisoners as humiliating, degrading and a threat to health amidst the coronavirus pandemic.

=== Ethiopia ===
On March 25, 2020, 4,011 prisoners were granted a pardon by the Ethiopian President Sahle-Work Zewde in an effort to prevent the spread of COVID-19. This pardon only applied to prisoners convicted of minor crimes who were serving sentences of up to three years, and those who were about to be released.

=== France ===
On March 16, 2020, a detainee died of COVID-19 in the Fresnes prison. On March 22, 2020, a mutiny erupted in the Uzerche Detention Center, where 250 inmates had to be evacuated because their cells were unusable.

=== Iran ===
On March 3, 2020, more than 54,000 prisoners were released temporarily to prevent the spread of COVID-19.

Prisoners rioted in southern Iran in prisons such as Aligudarz, Hamedan, and Tabriz, with some prisoners escaping. On March 27, 2020, 70 inmates escaped Saqqez Prison in the Kurdistan province. 100,000 prisoners were released as a measure to contain the pandemic, but an estimated 50,000 people remained in prison, including violent offenders, dual nationals and others with Western ties.

=== Ireland ===
On 20 March 2020, Minister for Justice Charles Flanagan announced the temporary release of up to 200 prisoners to reduce the risk of COVID-19 spreading through the country's jails. Prisoners were reported to be willing to work with prison officers to prevent their exposure to the virus. Social distancing measures in prisons included visible marks, the closing of gyms and recreation halls, inmates being fed in smaller groups and visits from outside disallowed. Deep cleaning occurred, the plates and mugs were replaced with hot food in single use cardboard containers. Another consequence of the virus was that less drugs found their way into the system. On 10 June, it was announced that not a single prisoner among the country's prison population of 3,705 had tested positive for COVID-19. On 22 August 2020, a 23-year-old woman in Dóchas Centre became the first prisoner in Ireland to test positive for COVID-19. On 30 October, the Irish Prison Service confirmed an outbreak of COVID-19 at the Midlands Prison after five inmates tested positive for COVID-19.

=== Italy ===
An investigation was opened after six convicts died in the Sant'Anna prison of Modena from overdoses. Other events that prompted the investigation included riots in San Vittore prison and in the La Dogaia prison in Prato.

Eighty detainees escaped from Foggia's prison amid the chaos in prisons sparked by the government's new restrictions due to the COVID-19 pandemic.

=== Japan ===
The Ministry of Justice (MOJ) decided that only lawyers are allowed to visit prisoners in prisons and detention houses in seven prefectures (Tokyo, Chiba, Saitama, Kanagawa, Osaka, Hyogo and Fukuoka), which are issued emergency declaration initially, from April 8 to May 6. MOJ explained that the legal basis of the measure is the National Property Act (国有財産法, Kokuyū Zaisan Hō). The Act on Penal Detention Facilities and the Treatment of Inmates and Detainees (刑事収容施設及び被収容者等の処遇に関する法律, Keiji Shūyō-shisetsu oyobi Hisyūyōsha-to no Shogū ni Kansuru Hōristu) does not have provisions for visiting restriction purpose of not spreading infectious diseases, therefore some lawyers criticized this decision. On April 20, 2020, MOJ extended this measure to prisons and detention houses in six prefectures (Hokkaido, Ibaraki, Ishikawa, Gifu, Aichi and Kyoto), which are designated as special alert prefectures (特定警戒都道府県, tokutei keikai todōfuken) from April 20 to May 6. On April 27, immigration centers (入国者収容所), facility that accommodates foreigners have been pronounced deportation, are also subject of visiting restriction.

The first case in Japan's penal detention facilities was detected at Osaka Detention House. As of April 28, there were 8 officers of Osaka Detention House, 1 officer of Tsukigata Prison, and 1 defendant of Tokyo Detention House confirmed cases of COVID-19.

=== Mexico ===
A riot in a migrant detention center in Tenosique, Tabasco, Mexico, left a Guatemalan man dead and four people injured on March 31, 2020. The detainees were concerned about a possible COVID-19 outbreak.

Mexico City began to sanitize its 13 penitentiaries and four detention centers on April 4, 2020. The number of visitors allowed was cut in half. Staff, providers, and inmates were tested for COVID-19. The inmates were to be given measles shots as the city was also experiencing an outbreak of measles.

=== Pakistan ===
The first case of COVID-19 in Pakistan's prisons was detected on March 24, 2020, in Camp Jail, Lahore. By April 14, 2020, 59 more cases were reported in the same jail, along with 14 in Sialkot Jail, seven in Gujranwala and nine in DG Khan Jail, taking Punjab province's total to 89. One case in Quetta district jail was reported on April 6, 2020.

=== Philippines ===
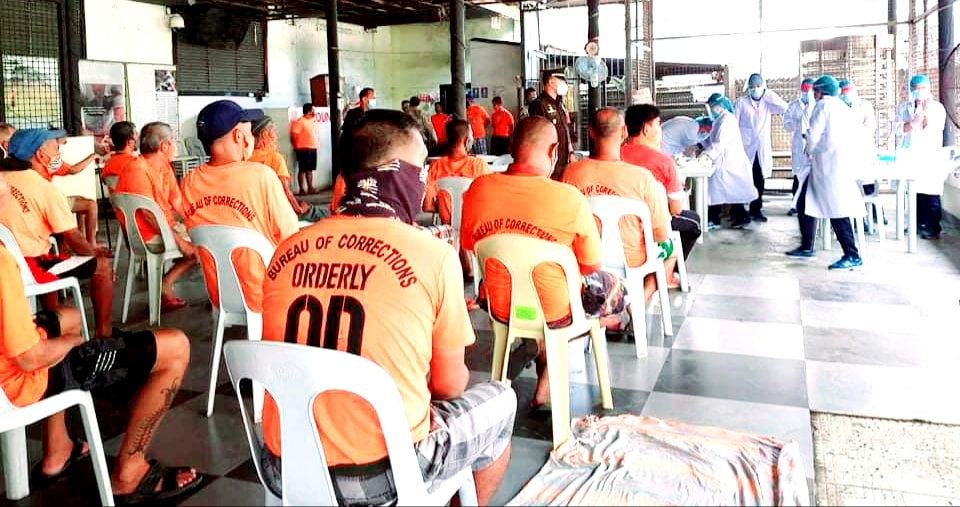
Detainees at the New Bilibid Prison in Muntinlupa getting tested for COVID-19.

Over 20,000 prisoners from over 400 jail facilities were released to mitigate the spread of COVID-19 in prisons in the Philippines.

=== Somaliland ===
President Muse Bihi Abdi pardoned 574 prisoners and ordered them released to control the spread of the virus.

=== Syria ===
ISIL militants in the Hassakeh province in eastern Syria rioted, and four escaped from prison.

=== Thailand ===
A riot started at the prison in the Buriram Province in northeastern Thailand on March 29, 2020, when a false rumor about a coronavirus infection spread as a cover-up for an escape attempt. Seven of the 2,100 prisoners escaped but were recaptured. Two prisoners at a different facility in the country were diagnosed with COVID-19, and families have been banned from visiting prisons in the country for 14 days.

=== Turkey ===
On March 13, 2020, Minister of Justice Abdulhamit Gül announced that meetings in all open and closed prisons, the use of family meeting rooms, and transfers between prisons would be delayed for two weeks.

On March 20, 2020, the Human Rights Association, Human Rights Foundation of Turkey, the Association of Lawyers for Liberty, the Contemporary Lawyers Association, and the Health and Social Service Workers Union of Civil Society in the Penal System, published a statement on the COVID-19 outbreak and urged immediate action in prisons. In their article, they emphasized the importance of informing the public, especially family and prisoners' lawyers, about quarantine practices and the health status of prisoners.

The Turkish parliament passed a law to free tens of thousands of prisoners on April 14, 2020. Human rights organizations criticized the law because it did not include individuals convicted under anti-terrorism laws, journalists, politicians, and lawyers in pre-trial detention.

=== United Kingdom ===
The government released specific guidance to prisons in the event of COVID-19 symptoms or cases, specifically the rule that states "any prisoner or detainee with a new, continuous cough or a high temperature should be placed in protective isolation for 7 days".

On March 18, 2020, the first coronavirus case was reported in a UK prison. The prisoner, who had been serving time in HMP Manchester (commonly referred to as Strangeways), was moved to a hospital. While no other prisoners or staff tested positive for the virus, thirteen prisoners and four members of staff were put into isolation as a precaution. Prison visits remained open.

On March 19, 2020, it was revealed that around 75 officers at HMP Berwyn in Wales were off work due to sickness or self-isolation, and 22 prisoners showed symptoms of coronavirus were being isolated by the prison. However, the prison had enough staff members to remain fully operational.

Following the case in HMP Manchester, public services think tank Reform called for the release of 2,305 "low-risk" offenders on short sentences to reduce the risk of coronavirus within the prison population. Their report argued that prison are "overcrowded [with] insanitary conditions and poor-quality healthcare". Similar actions were taken in Iran and the United States.

On March 21, 2020, former Justice Secretary David Gauke called for the suspension of short sentences and early release of some prisoners to avoid the spread of COVID-19.

=== United States ===
During the first half of 2020, three-quarters of outbreaks of over 500 people occurred at correctional facilities. At least 13 people incarcerated at Marion Correctional Institute died of COVID-19. By late August 2021, over 2,500 people had died from COVID-19 while incarcerated in U.S. prisons.

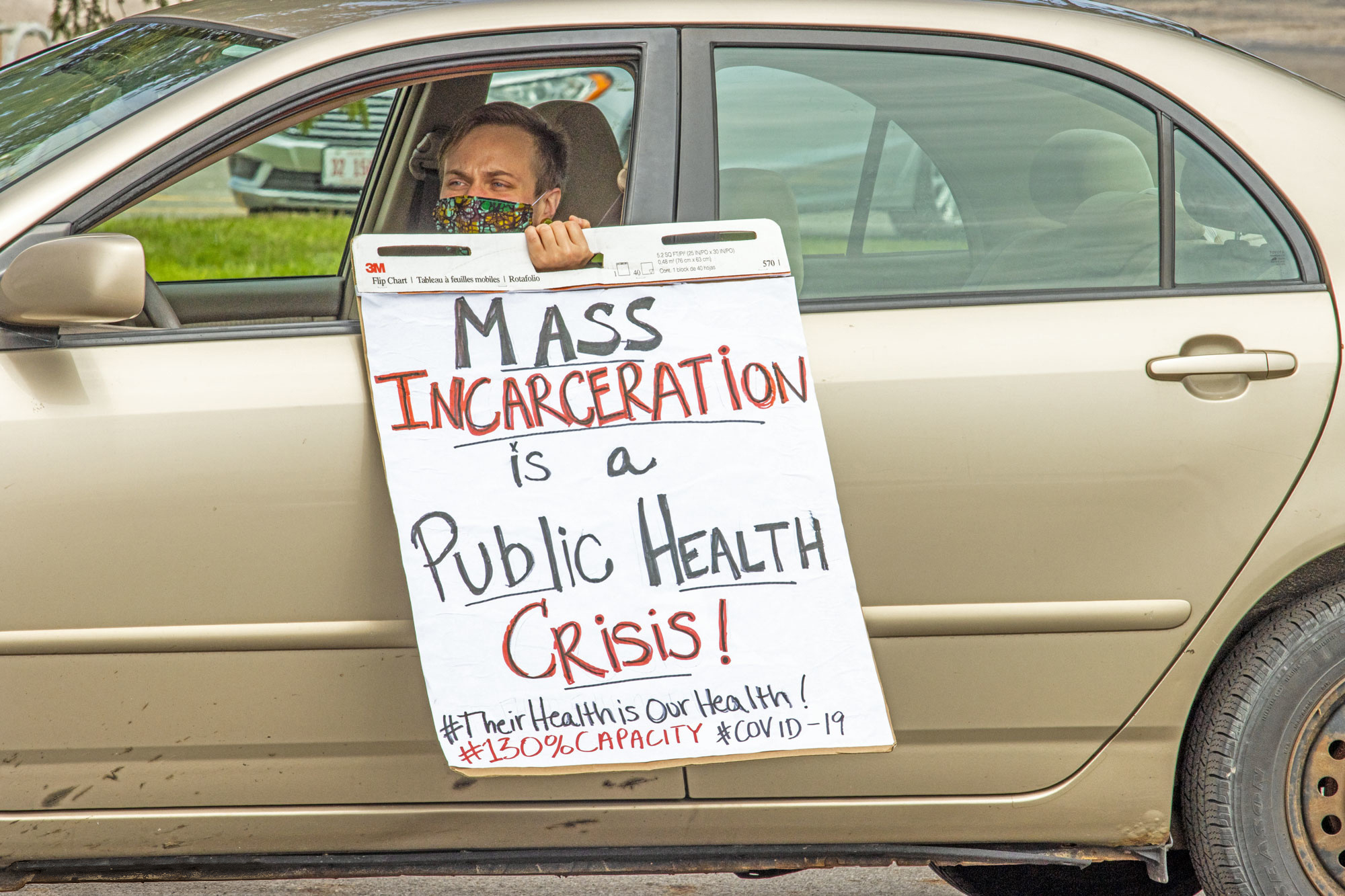
April 24, 2020: Protest event in Columbus, Ohio calling for 20,000 early prison releases

On any given day, 2.3 million people were incarcerated in 6,000 facilities in the United States, presenting officials with the difficult task of preventing coronavirus outbreaks among prisoners and staff. Prisoners often sleep close together. Many prisons have poor sanitation, and alcohol-based hand sanitizer is often prohibited for inmates.

The vast majority of these prisoners were in state or local custody. A remaining minority of prisoners were in federal custody.

Between March 22–26, 2020, 23 inmates escaped and at least one inmate tested positive for COVID-19 in each of two prisons. Judges ordered the liberation of thousands of prison inmates, and there were calls to release all medically vulnerable inmates. In that same month, the UCLA Law COVID Behind Bars Data Project was established to monitor the spread and impact of COVID in prisons.

On December 18, 2020, the Associated Press and The Marshall Project stated that one in five prisoners in the United States had been infected with the COVID virus. This was over four times the infection rate of the general population around the time of the report. In some states, half of prisoners had been infected.

COVID-19 has also spread at an elevated rate within immigration detention facilities in the United States.

==== Federal correctional system ====
Former Attorney General William Barr announced on March 26, 2020, that he had instructed federal prisons to free some inmates to lessen the impact of the coronavirus epidemic. This order favors inmates over 60 who have not been convicted of violent or sex crimes. This applies to about 2,000 of the 170,000 inmates in the federal correctional system. At the time of Barr's announcement, there had been about a dozen cases of COVID-19 among federal prisoners and staff. A high-profile release was Paul Manafort, the former campaign chairman of President Trump, who, at age 71, left a federal prison in Pennsylvania to serve the rest of his sentence in home confinement due to coronavirus concerns. Another high-profile released prisoner was Rita Crundwell (68), the biggest municipal embezzler in U.S. history, went to live on her brother's farm.

Patrick Jones, a 49-year old inmate at a minimum-security prison in Oakdale, Louisiana, became the first fatality of COVID-19 in a federal prison on March 28. Five other inmates were infected. The federal Bureau of Prisons is locking all its 146,000 inmates in their cells from April 1 to 14. COVID-19 is so common at Federal Correctional Complex, Oakdale in Louisiana that authorities stopped testing for it and instead assume that anyone with symptoms is infected with it.

On July 14, 2020, Daniel Lewis Lee became the first federal prisoner to be executed in 17 years. His victims' family had sued to delay the execution, citing their desire to witness it but asserting their fears of contracting COVID-19. Several days before the scheduled execution, a court ruled that it could be rescheduled to allow his victims' family to attend, but the U.S. Supreme Court subsequently denied that extension.

On January 7, 2021, Joseph Lee Fultz arrived at a federal prison in Indiana to begin a 27-year sentence. There was a COVID-19 outbreak at the prison, and Fultz was diagnosed within days. Although the government recorded his health status as "recovered," he died in his cell on February 8, 2021, raising questions about the overall accuracy of data from federal prisons.

==== Effects of COVID-19 on Minority Groups ====
Although as of May 13, 2020, Black prisoners make up 1/3 of the prison population in Missouri, they have had 58% of the positive tests for the state's prison population. 43 prison agencies, including the Federal Bureau of Prisons, have refused to provide any demographic information (besides ages) of prisoners affected by COVID-19. This makes knowing which prisons have larger populations of non-English speaking prisoners who need help understanding preventive measures, such as social distancing, much more difficult. Populations that are more likely to be incarcerated are generally disproportionately affected by pre-existing health conditions such as HIV, hepatitis C and tuberculosis. This creates high concentrations of these diseases within prison populations, with those affected by them having a higher susceptibility to contracting COVID.

==== Health Services ====
Many incarcerated people have preexisting conditions that worsen within prisons because of the settings such as lack of proper sanitation procedures and sharing close spaces in many already overcrowded prisons. The cost of medical services disincentivizes prisons from responding to incarcerated people's illnesses. Even before the COVID-19 pandemic, prisons had difficulties with managing incarcerated people's illnesses for reasons such as the inability to triage. "Punitive solitary confinement" has also been employed as opposed to medical isolation during the COVID-19 pandemic. With the use of solitary confinement, incarcerated people are less likely to report any sickness because they do not want to experience solitary confinement since it is often enforced in inhumane ways that have many damaging effects, especially emotional/psychological ones. This means that there are incarcerated people with unreported symptoms interacting with other incarcerated people and staff, which leads to higher chances of the spread of illness. With the COVID-19 pandemic, there is also a lack of testing, trained and informed health services staff, and treatment resources available.

==== Immigration detention facilities ====
In the past decades, Immigration and Customs Enforcement (ICE) has turned to private, for profit companies to house the growing detainee population. Facilities operated by private companies are not subject to the same standards of accountability and oversight as government-operated facilities. Prior to the coronavirus, conditions in ICE detention facilities were described as overcrowded, unsanitary, understaffed, and dangerous. Detainees were not given sufficient access to medical care, and outbreaks of diseases such as mumps occurred. Over the course of the coronavirus pandemic, ICE has reported that 7,583 detention center detainees have tested positive for COVID-19, and 8 have died (as of 12/03/2020). However, ICE data has been criticized for having gaps and flaws.

In March, detainees at several U.S. Immigration and Customs Enforcement (ICE) facilities went on strike to demand sanitary supplies. Federal judges in California and Pennsylvania have ordered ICE to release several detainees who have sued. Lawsuits are pending in Maryland, Massachusetts, New Jersey, Pennsylvania, and Washington state. As of April 2, there were 35,000 people in ICE custody.

Twenty-seven migrant children held by the Office of Refugee Resettlement have tested positive for COVID-19 as of April 13. Six have recovered; three are in isolation in Texas and Illinois.

In April and May, a series of letters were penned and signed by detainees in neighboring detention facilities in Eloy, AZ. The letters described a lack of food, medical treatment, and adequate safety measures as well as inhumane conditions in quarantine. One detainee stated they were going to ask to be deported in order to escape the facility's conditions.

The Vera Institute of Justice released a peer-reviewed model based on ICE data from late May. Of the 80,655 people Vera estimates to be held in ICE detention at any point over a 60-day time period, they calculate that 15,549 would contract COVID-19. 235 of these would require hospitalization. 2-17 people would die in the first 60 days.

==== By state ====
===== Arizona =====
On March 21, it was reported that 50 inmates had been released in Coconino County to reduce coronavirus risks. In Pima County, the sheriff proposed measures to reduce the inmate population, such as releasing 135 people jailed for probation violations or relocating some prisoners to state prisons. July 15: 569 inmates at 13 of the states 16 prisons have tested positive.

===== California =====
- Alameda County: On March 20, Alameda County officials announced that 247 people would be released from Santa Rita Jail, located in Dublin.
- Los Angeles County: On March 17, the county Sheriff's Department announced that it had reduced the inmate population by 600 during the previous two weeks in an attempt to keep prisoners from being infected by coronavirus.
- San Diego County: On March 16, the Sheriff's Department said it had started reducing the number of people being accepted into the county's seven jails and had received approval for early release of some prisoners. Other measures included in-cell meals, a suspension of visitation, and suspension of jail programs.
- Santa Barbara County: As of April 17, the county jail had released 324 prisoners. The Sheriff announced on a Friday night that one inmate has tested positive for COVID-19.
- As of July 17, 39 prison inmates have died in California prisons; about half of these were disabled.
- From March 31 to June 6, there has been 42,107 confirmed cases of COVID-19 along with 510 deaths from state and federal prisons with a case rate of 3,251 per 100,000 prisoners; making it 5.5 times higher than the case rate of US population which is 587 per 100,000.

===== Georgia =====
The Georgia Department of Corrections (DOC) suspended visitations and announced additional sanitation measures, but The Atlanta Journal-Constitution reported that inmates had seen no extra soap. A prison worker was confirmed to have COVID-19 on March 18—the DOC, citing "security and HIPAA restrictions", declined to name the affected prison. The first detected case of COVID-19 in a prison inmate was at Lee State Prison two days later, on March 20.

On March 21, CNN reported that three inmates tested positive for COVID-19 at Lee State Prison in Leesburg. Three other prisoners were under observation with similar symptoms.

===== Illinois =====
Testing for COVID-19 revealed the first case of infection on March 22 in Cook County Jail, Chicago. 10% of the 5,000 inmates were released as a cautionary measure, but the number of infections had risen to 134 by March 30. Fifteen inmates and eleven staff have tested positive at other facilities in the state, with at least 80 waiting for test results. One prisoner died on March 30 at Stateville Correctional Center in Crest Hill, Illinois.

===== Louisiana =====
As of April 9, six out of nine deaths among prisoners in federal prisons in the United States had occurred within a single prison at Oakdale, Louisiana.

Twenty-seven youths aged 13 to 20, and 14 staff have tested positive in Louisiana's four secure juvenile detention facilities—the Bridge City Center near New Orleans, the Acadiana Center for Youth in Bunkie, the Swanson Center for Youth in Columbia, and the Swanson Center for Youth in Monroe. Children are confined to their rooms, they do not get schooling or visits from case managers or clergy.

===== Massachusetts =====
The first prison case of COVID-19 in Massachusetts was reported on March 21 at Massachusetts Treatment Center. The prisoner and his roommate were placed in quarantine on March 19. As of March 31, 17 prisoners had tested positive at the Massachusetts Treatment Center as well as six Department of Correction staff—four at the treatment center, one at MCI-Shirley, and one at the Department of Correction central office. Two prisoners have tested positive at the Middlesex Jail and House of Correction in Billerica, as have 14 employees in the state's county jail systems.

===== Michigan =====
The Michigan Department of Corrections banned visitors to prisons, along with prohibiting any volunteers from working in them. Staff at prisons were required to have their temperatures taken and them to be under 100.4 °F (38.0 °C) along with other measures. The Michigan Career and Technical Institute suspended all programs until April 5.

===== New Jersey =====
On March 24, a 31-year-old male Mexican national in custody by U.S. Immigration and Customs Enforcement (ICE) in Hackensack, New Jersey, was held in isolation after being tested positive for COVID-19. He was the first migrant to test positive, and ICE suspended the intake of new migrants.

===== New York =====
After a guard and a prisoner tested positive for coronavirus at the Rikers Island prison, New York City Mayor Bill de Blasio stated that city officials will identify individuals for release, including persons arrested for minor crimes and those most vulnerable to infection due to chronic health problems. In addition to the cases at Rikers, other prisons in the state, including Sing Sing, have recorded positive tests among prisoners, and one member of the correction's department has died from the virus. Rikers Island released 51 non-criminals with underlying conditions on April 14.

As of March 25, 75 New York City inmates had tested positive for COVID-19 and 37 city corrections staff members, up from 50 inmates and 30 staffers the previous day.

===== North Carolina =====
The Wayne County Health Department reported their first recorded death on April 23 after testing positive on April 18, and that as of April 20, Neuse Correctional Institution had approximately 450 of its 700 inmates test positive, and all inmates were to be tested; few reported symptoms. All of the staff could be tested as well. As of April 24, positive cases had risen to 465.

Pender Correctional Institution, in Burgaw reported the state's first death in a prison.

As of December 13, 6,059 cases, more than 1 in 6 people in custody, has tested positive for COVID-19.

===== Ohio =====
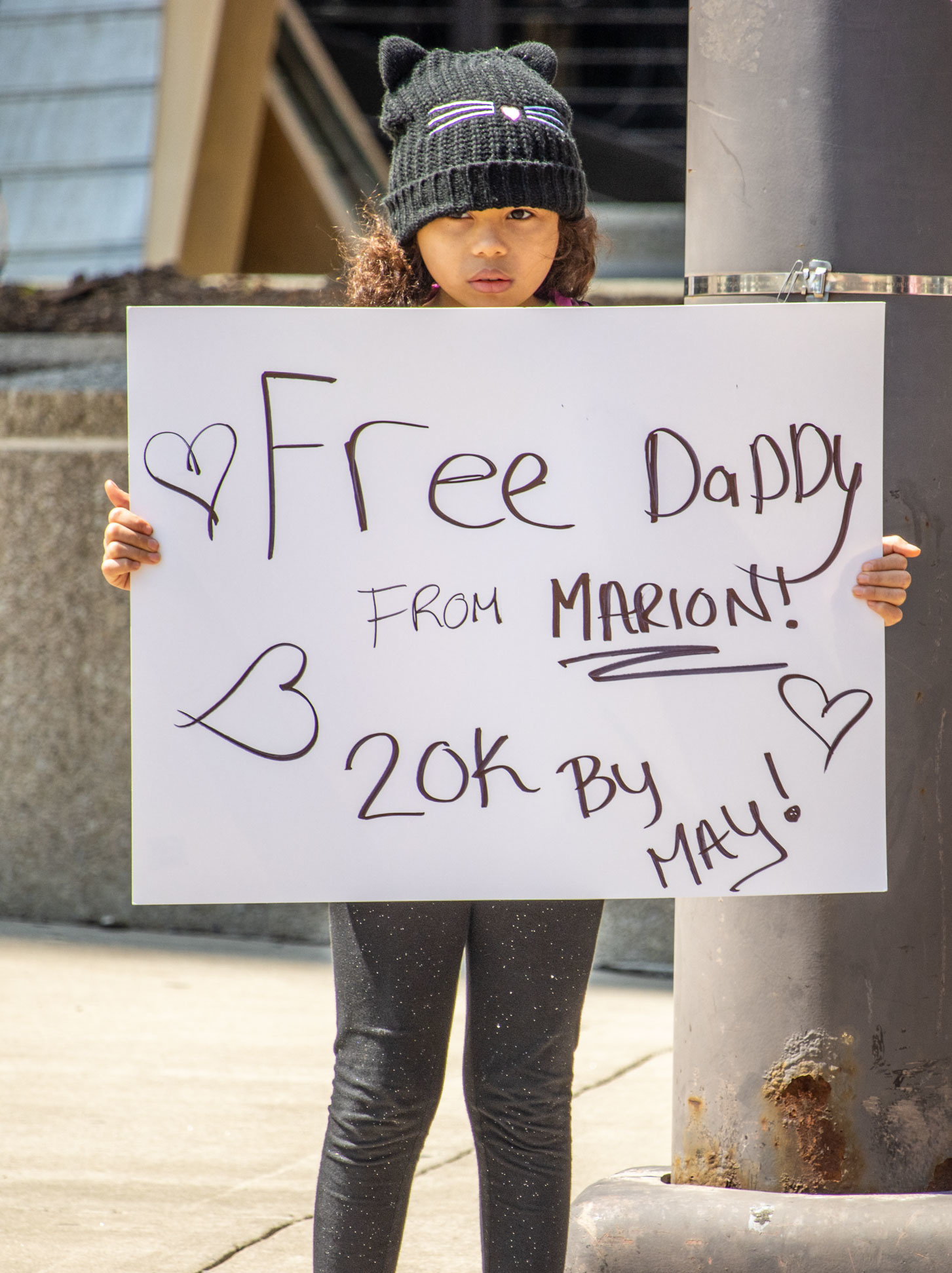
Protester at an April 24 event with a sign referencing the Marion County prison

On April 8, the National Guard arrived at Elkton Federal Prison in Columbiana County to assist the medical staff when a large number of prisoners became ill with the virus. On April 18, the National Guard and Highway Patrol arrived at the state prison in Marion county to assist with "mission critical functions" after infections of correctional workers and prisoners. By April 19, over 1800 prisoners at Marion Correctional Institution, approximately 3/4ths of the population, plus 100 staff had tested positive. Overall, the prison system had almost 2500 cases by April 19, representing almost a fifth of Ohio's cases.

On April 22, the Marion County prison was first-ranked as the hot-spot for the virus in the country, followed by the Pickaway Correctional Institution. Marion County was first in cases per capita in the nation, while Pickaway County was fourth. The Ohio prison system is designed to hold about 35,000 inmates, but held about 49,000 in April 2020.

On April 22, federal judge James S. Gwin ordered the Elkton prison to identify vulnerable inmates and transfer them from the facility. He also ordered officials to "evaluate each subclass member's eligibility for transfer out of Elkton through any means, including but not limited to compassionate release, parole or community supervision, transfer furlough or non-transfer furlough within two weeks". He noted, "with the shockingly limited available testing and the inability to distance inmates, COVID-19 is going to continue to spread, not only among the inmate population, but also among the staff". He condemned the Federal Department of Corrections, asking: "Why has the Justice Department allocated Elkton an entirely insignificant number of tests while Ohio has been able to pull off mass testing across not only Marion, but at multiple institutions?"

===== Pennsylvania =====
Due to ongoing public health concerns related to the coronavirus, on March 13, the Eastern State Penitentiary (a historic site which stopped operating as a prison in 1971) was closed to the public.

===== South Dakota =====
Nine prisoners escaped from a minimum-security women's prison on March 23, the same day a fellow inmate tested positive for COVID-19. Three were captured on the Crow Creek Indian Reservation and one was captured in Rapid City. It was not immediately clear if the diagnosis prompted the prisoners to escape.

===== Texas =====
As of July 2020, at least 84 inmates have died in Texas prisons.

===== Washington =====
Fourteen inmates escaped from the county jail in Yakima County on March 23. They used a table to break down an exit door and then climbed a fence. The U.S. Marshals Service offered rewards of up to $1,000 for information leading to the arrests of these escaped inmates.

===== Wisconsin =====
The first COVID-19 positive case in the Wisconsin state prison system, an employee at Waupun Correctional Institution, was reported on March 18 by warden Brian Foster. Inmate advocacy groups called on the Department of Corrections and Governor Tony Evers to change prison policies to protect prisoners and guards during the epidemic.

=== Venezuela ===
Reuters reported that Venezuela's notoriously overcrowded and unsanitary prisons could spread the coronavirus "like a fast-moving fire." Venezuelan prisons frequently lack bathrooms, people sleep on floors, and many inmates spend their days without shirts or shoes on, in part to combat the heat of windowless facilities. This has caused US Secretary of State Mike Pompeo to demand the Maduro government release six Citgo executives, held in prison since 2017, on humanitarian grounds. Pompeo said that all six men have weakened immune systems and "face a grave health risk if they become infected" with COVID-19. The Venezuelan Medical Federation asked for the release of political prisoners in the country, specifically Roberto Marrero, Juan Requesens and other lawmakers.

On March 18, 84 out of 518 inmates escaped from a prison in San Carlos, Zulia, after restrictions against the pandemic were announced, including jail visits. Mayor Bladimir Labrador declared that ten prisoners were killed during the prison break and that two policemen were detained for complicity. According to Carlos Nieto Palma from the NGO Ventana a la Libertad, the suspension of visits directly affects the prisoner's nutrition, given that there was no state-sponsored program to feed them. The NGO Provea denounced "grave human rights violations" after a military spokesperson announced the "neutralization" of 35 escapees. State authorities later declared that there were eight deaths.
