= Faith Beasley =

Professor

Faith E. Beasley

Faith Evelyn Beasley is a professor of French cultural studies at Dartmouth College. She is known for her work on French cultural history, and the intersection of French history and the voices of women writers.

== Education and career ==
Beasley grew up in Michigan and attended Plainwell High School. She received her Bachelor of Arts degree in French from Mount Holyoke College in 1980. She studied abroad in Paris at the École Normale supérieure from 1984 until 1985, and then in 1986 she earned her Ph.D. in French from Princeton University.

After receiving her PhD, Beasley served as a teaching assistant at the Lycée Berthelot in Toulouse, France, and as a visiting instructor of English at the Ecole Nationale de la Statistique et des Etudes Economiques in Paris, France. Beasley joined Dartmouth College as an assistant professor of French in 1986. She has been a tenured professor of French since 2008.

She served as the editor of Cahiers du dix-septième from 2008 to 2016.

Beasley received a Guggenheim Fellowship in 2012 for her research on Versailles and the Taj Mahal.

== Selected publications ==
- Revising Memory: Women's Fiction and Memoirs in Seventeenth-Century France. New Brunswick, N.J.; Rutgers University Press, 1990
- Beasley, Faith Evelyn; Jensen, Katharine Ann, eds. (1998). Approaches to Teaching Lafayette's the Princess of Clèves. New York, NY: Modern Language Assn of Amer. ISBN 978-0-87352-745-3.
- Salons, History, and the Creation of Seventeenth-Century France: Mastering Memory. Ashgate Publishing Company, 2006
- Beasley, Faith E., ed. (2011). Teaching seventeenth- and eighteenth-century French women writers. New York: Modern Language Association of America. ISBN 978-1-60329-096-8. OCLC 727610615.
- Versailles Meets the Taj Mahal: François Bernier, Marguerite de La Sablière and Enlightening Conversations in Seventeenth-Century France. Toronto: University of Toronto Press, 2018
- Versailles à la rencontre du Taj Mahal: Conversations éclairées sur l’Inde au temps du Roi-Soleil. Translated by Patrick Graille. Paris: Les Belles Lettres, 2024
