= Jack Conklin =

American football player (born 1994)

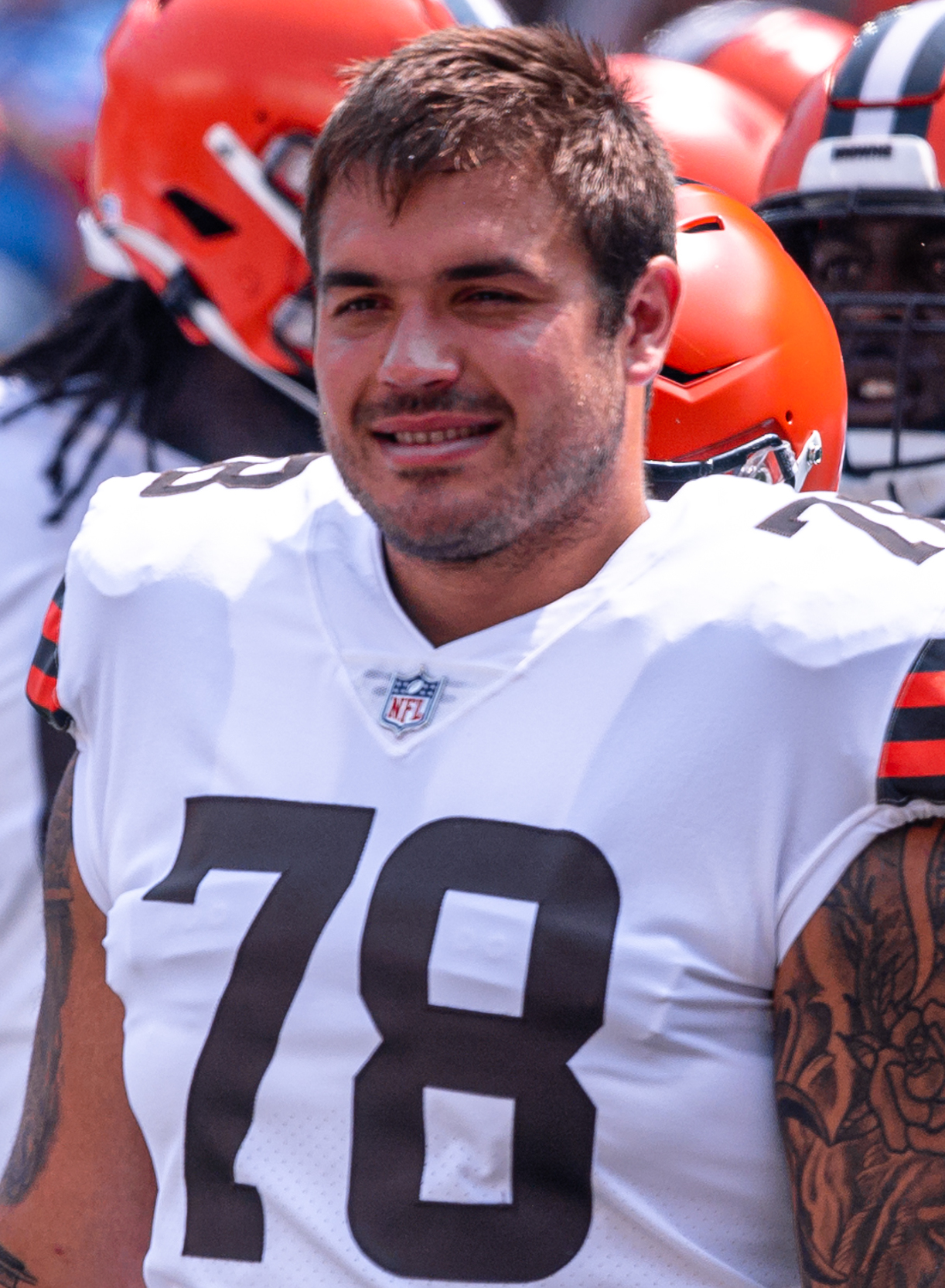
- Conklin with the Cleveland Browns in 2021

Profile
- Position: Offensive tackle

Personal information
- Born: August 17, 1994 (age 32); Plainwell, Michigan, U.S.
- Listed height: 6 ft 6 in (1.98 m)
- Listed weight: 308 lb (140 kg)

Career information
- High school: Plainwell (MI)
- College: Michigan State (2012–2015)
- NFL draft: 2016: 1st round, 8th overall pick

Career history
- Tennessee Titans (2016–2019); Cleveland Browns (2020–2025)

Awards and highlights
- 2× First-team All-Pro (2016, 2020); PFWA All-Rookie Team (2016); First-team All-American (2015); First-team All-Big Ten (2015); Second-team All-Big Ten (2014)

Career NFL statistics as of 2025
- Games played: 114
- Games started: 114
- Stats at Pro Football Reference

Jonathan Jackson Conklin (born August 17, 1994) is an American professional football offensive tackle. He played college football for the Michigan State Spartans and was selected by the Tennessee Titans eighth overall in the 2016 NFL draft. Conklin has been named a first-team All-Pro twice.

== Early life ==
Conklin was born in Plainwell, Michigan on August 17, 1994, to Darren Conklin and Jennifer Jackson. He attended Plainwell High School in Plainwell, where he played football under his father who was the head coach. Conklin also played basketball in high school.

== College career ==
Conklin joined the Michigan State University football team as a walk-on player.

After redshirting his first year, Conklin started 13 of 14 games at either right or left offensive tackle his redshirt freshman year in 2013.

As a sophomore, Conklin started all 13 games at left tackle.

Conklin was selected as a 2015 First-team All-American (Sporting News, USA Today) as well as the 2015 First-team All-Big Ten Conference (coaches, media).

During his career with the Spartans, Conklin started in 38 of his 39 career games (35 at left tackle and three at right tackle). On January 6, 2016, Conklin announced that he would forgo his senior season and declare for the 2016 NFL draft.

== Professional career ==
=== Pre-draft ===
Conklin was projected to be a top-10 pick going into the 2016 NFL draft by NFL draft experts and scouts after he had a successful junior year where he only gave up two sacks and was penalized twice. Conklin attended private workout of pre-draft visits with multiple teams, including the Buffalo Bills, San Diego Chargers, Pittsburgh Steelers, Tennessee Titans, New York Jets, Indianapolis Colts, Atlanta Falcons, Detroit Lions, and Tampa Bay Buccaneers during his pre-draft process.

External videos
- Jack Conklin's NFL Combine Workout
- Jack Conklin runs the 40-yard dash

At the conclusion of the pre-draft process, Conklin was projected to be a first round pick and was expected to among the first 15 players selected by NFL draft experts and scouts. He was ranked as the third best offensive tackle prospect in the draft by DraftScout.com, NFL analyst Mike Mayock, and ESPN analyst Jeff Legwold. Conklin was ranked the fourth best offensive tackle by Sports Illustrated.

Pre-draft measurables
Height	Weight	Arm length	Hand span	Wingspan	40-yard dash	10-yard split	20-yard split	20-yard shuttle	Three-cone drill	Vertical jump	Broad jump	Bench press
6 ft 5 3/4 in (1.97 m)	308 lb (140 kg)	35 in (0.89 m)	10 3/8 in (0.26 m)	6 ft 11 1/4 in (2.11 m)	5.00 s	1.75 s	2.92 s	4.57 s	7.63 s	30.0 in (0.76 m)	8 ft 7 in (2.62 m)	25 reps
All values from NFL Combine

=== Tennessee Titans ===
External videos
- Titans draft Jack Conklin 8th overall
- First Draft: Jack Conklin

==== 2016 season ====
The Titans selected Conklin in the first round (eighth overall) of the 2016 NFL draft. They traded their first (15th overall) and third round (76th overall) picks to the Cleveland Browns in order to receive the eighth overall pick, as well as a sixth round pick (176th overall), to draft Conklin. Conklin was the second offensive tackle drafted after the unexpected draft fall of top-ranked offensive tackle Laremy Tunsil.

On May 26, 2016, Conklin signed a four-year, $15.89 million rookie contract with $15.44 million guaranteed and a signing bonus of $9.76 million.

Conklin entered training camp slated as the starting right tackle, replacing Byron Bell. Head coach Mike Mularkey named Conklin the starting right tackle to begin the regular season. Conklin joined starting left tackle Taylor Lewan, offensive guards Quinton Spain and Chance Warmack, and center Ben Jones.

Conklin made his professional regular season debut and first NFL start in the Titans' season-opening 25–16 loss to the Minnesota Vikings. On December 21, 2016, it was announced that Conklin was selected as an alternate for the 2017 Pro Bowl. He started in all 16 games during his rookie season in 2016 and was named First-team All-Pro. Conklin was also named to the PFWA All-Rookie Team. He received an overall grade of 88.9 from Pro Football Focus (PFF), which was the fifth highest among all offensive linemen in 2016 and was the highest overall grade among all rookie offensive linemen. The Titans' offensive line was ranked as the top offensive line in the league in 2016 by PFF. The Titans finished 9–7 from a 3–13 record the previous season and narrowly missed the playoffs.

==== 2017 season ====
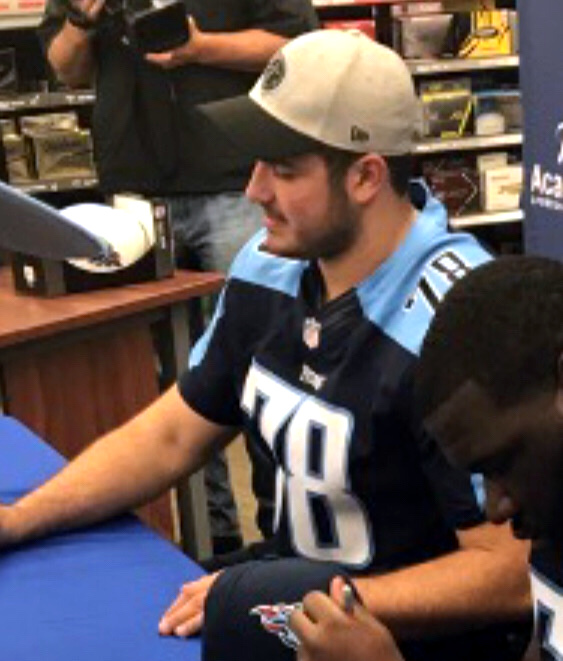
Conklin signing autographs in 2017

Mularkey retained Conklin and Taylor Lewan as the starting offensive tackles in 2017. Conklin started all 16 games at right tackle in 2017 and received an overall grade of 81.8 from PFF. His grade ranked 12th among all offensive tackles in 2017.

The Titans finished second in the AFC South with a 9–7 record in 2017 and earned a playoff berth for the first time since 2008. On January 6, 2018, Conklin started in his first career playoff game as the Titans narrowly defeated the Kansas City Chiefs 22–21 in the AFC Wildcard Game. The following week, Conklin tore his ACL during a 35–14 road loss to the New England Patriots in the AFC Divisional Round.

==== 2018 season ====
On January 15, 2018, the Titans announced their decision to fire Mularkey. Five days later, the Titans announced their decision to hire Houston Texans defensive coordinator Mike Vrabel as their new head coach. On January 26, it was reported that Conklin's surgery to repair his torn ACL had successfully been completed. New offensive coordinator Matt LaFleur retained the starting offensive line, that also included starting left tackle Taylor Lewan, offensive guards Quinton Spain and Josh Kline, and center Ben Jones.

Conklin missed the first three games of the season in order to recover from his ACL injury. Conklin suffered an injury during a Week 9 28–14 road victory over the Dallas Cowboys. He soon entered concussion protocol. Conklin would not play the next week against the Patriots. However, he did return for the Week 11 game against the Colts. Conklin then suffered a knee injury three weeks later against the Jacksonville Jaguars and was placed on injured reserve on December 11. The Titans finished 9–7 for the third consecutive year.

==== 2019 season ====
On May 1, 2019, the Titans declined the fifth-year option on Conklin's contract, making him a free agent in 2020.

Conklin started all 16 games for the Titans in 2019, helping Derrick Henry win the NFL rushing yards title. The Titans finished 9–7 for the fourth consecutive year and qualified for the playoffs as the #6-seed in the AFC. In the playoffs, the Titans won upsets over the Patriots and the Baltimore Ravens, with Conklin blocking for Henry as he ran for nearly 200 yards in each game before losing the AFC Championship Game on the road to eventual Super Bowl champions Kansas City Chiefs with Conklin starting all three playoff games.

=== Cleveland Browns ===
On March 20, 2020, Conklin signed a three-year, $42 million contract with the Cleveland Browns. He was placed on the reserve/COVID-19 list by the team on November 18, and was activated three days later. Conklin was named to the 2020 All-Pro Team, along with three of his teammates: defensive end Myles Garrett and guards Joel Bitonio and Wyatt Teller.

On November 6, 2021, Conklin was placed on injured reserve with an elbow injury. He was activated on November 27. The next day, a Week 12 Sunday Night Football matchup against the Baltimore Ravens, Conklin suffered a right knee injury putting him out of the game. It was later revealed that Conklin tore his patellar tendon and was placed on season ending injured reserve.

On December 23, 2022, Conklin signed a four-year, $60 million contract extension with the Browns through the 2026 season.

In Week 1 of the 2023 season, Conklin suffered a torn ACL and MCL and was placed on season-ending injured reserve on September 12, 2023.

Conklin started all eight of his appearances for Cleveland during the 2025 season. On December 20, 2025, Conklin was placed on season-ending injured reserve due to a concussion he suffered in Week 13 against the San Francisco 49ers.

== NFL career statistics ==
Legend
**Bold**	Career high

=== Regular season ===
Year	Team	Games		Offense					
Year	Team	GP	GS	Snaps	Pct	Holding	False start	Decl/Pen	Acpt/Pen
2016	TEN	16	16	**1,061**	**100%**	0	2	0	3
2017	TEN	16	16	1,021	**100%**	2	**3**	2	**6**
2018	TEN	9	9	498	90%	1	1	1	4
2019	TEN	16	16	933	94%	3	2	1	**6**
2020	CLE	15	15	1,002	**100%**	1	0	0	2
2021	CLE	7	7	361	77%	2	0	1	2
2022	CLE	14	14	914	95%	**4**	0	**3**	**6**
2023	CLE	1	1	22	30%	0	0	0	0
2024	CLE	12	12	817	97%	0	2	0	2
2025	CLE	8	8	382	73%	1	0	0	3
Career		114	114	7,011	86%	14	10	8	34

== Personal life ==
Conklin resides with his wife, Caitlyn Riley, and their daughter.
