= Plainwell, Michigan =

- City
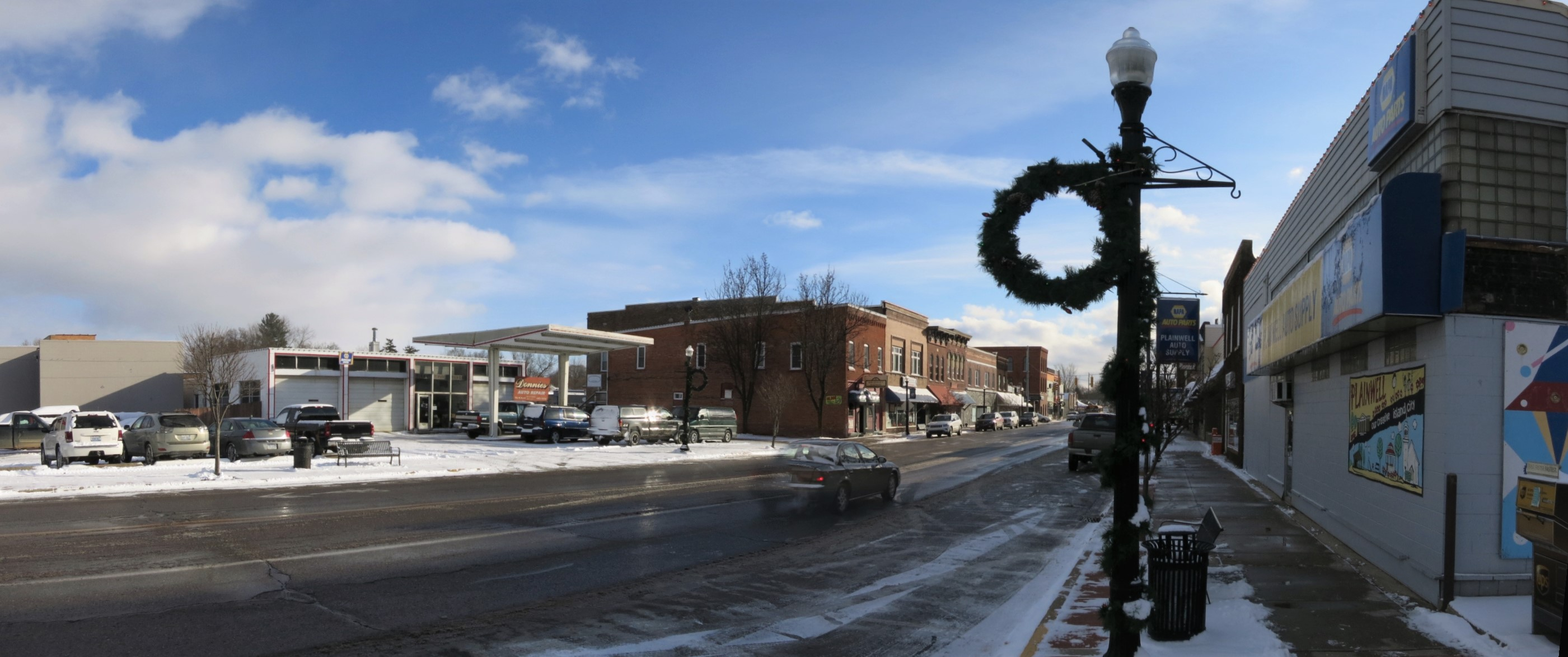
- Nickname: The Island City
- Location of Plainwell, Michigan
- Coordinates: 42°26′36″N 85°38′34″W
- Country: United States
- State: Michigan
- County: Allegan
- Incorporated (village): March 26, 1869

Government
  - Mayor: Brad Keeler

Area
  - Total: 2.07 sq mi (5.37 km^{2})
  - Land: 1.99 sq mi (5.16 km^{2})
  - Water: 0.081 sq mi (0.21 km^{2})
- Elevation: 728 ft (222 m)

Population (2020)
  - Total: 3,788
  - Density: 1,901.5/sq mi (734.19/km^{2})
- Time zone: UTC-5 (Eastern (EST))
  - Summer (DST): UTC-4 (EDT)
- ZIP code: 49080
- Area code: 269
- FIPS code: 26-64740
- GNIS feature ID: 0635077
- Website: www.plainwell.org

Plainwell is a city in Allegan County in the U.S. state of Michigan. The population was 3,788 at the 2020 census.

Plainwell is located on M-89 just east of its junction with US 131. The city of Otsego is about three miles (4.8 km) to the west. The city of Kalamazoo is about ten miles (16 km) to the south, and the city of Grand Rapids is about thirty-five miles (56 km) to the north. The Kalamazoo River flows through the center of the city and it is known as "The Island City".

== History ==
This part of Michigan was settled in the 1830s, after the removal of native people. Allegan County was organized in 1835, and the Plainwell area was settled soon after. It was on a stagecoach route from Kalamazoo to Grand Rapids, and later the Grand Rapids and Indiana Railroad was constructed along the same route. After the advent of the automobile, U.S. Route 131 was created and run through the town. In the 1960s, an improved 4-lane US-131 was built west of town to connect Kalamazoo and Grand Rapids, with an interchange on M-89 between Plainwell and Otsego. This allowed the town to become a kind of "bedroom community" for Kalamazoo or the southern part of Grand Rapids.

== Geography ==
According to the United States Census Bureau, the city has a total area of 2.06 square miles (5.34 km^{2}), of which 1.98 square miles (5.13 km^{2}) is land and 0.08 square miles (0.21 km^{2}) is water. The nickname Island City has to do with a power canal which diverts a portion of the Kalamazoo River around the downtown area, causing it to be an island.

=== Major highways ===
- US 131 is a freeway that is located in the western portion of the city.
- M-43 follows M-89 for most of its route in Plainwell, but soon has a concurrency with U.S. 131 just before the city line.
- M-89 has a concurrency with M-43 for most of its route in Plainwell, but continues west alone into Otsego.

== Demographics ==
Historical population
Census	Pop.	Note	%±
1870	1,035		—
1880	1,356		31.0%
1890	1,414		4.3%
1900	1,318		−6.8%
1910	1,493		13.3%
1920	2,049		37.2%
1930	2,279		11.2%
1940	2,424		6.4%
1950	2,767		14.2%
1960	3,125		12.9%
1970	3,195		2.2%
1980	3,751		17.4%
1990	4,057		8.2%
2000	3,933		−3.1%
2010	3,804		−3.3%
2020	3,788		−0.4%
U.S. Decennial Census

=== 2020 census ===
As of the 2020 census, Plainwell had a population of 3,788. The median age was 40.2 years. 21.8% of residents were under the age of 18 and 19.0% of residents were 65 years of age or older. For every 100 females there were 90.9 males, and for every 100 females age 18 and over there were 85.9 males age 18 and over.

100.0% of residents lived in urban areas, while 0.0% lived in rural areas.

There were 1,595 households in Plainwell, of which 29.8% had children under the age of 18 living in them. Of all households, 40.5% were married-couple households, 19.4% were households with a male householder and no spouse or partner present, and 33.0% were households with a female householder and no spouse or partner present. About 33.5% of all households were made up of individuals and 15.1% had someone living alone who was 65 years of age or older.

There were 1,659 housing units, of which 3.9% were vacant. The homeowner vacancy rate was 1.1% and the rental vacancy rate was 4.0%.

Racial composition as of the 2020 census
Race	Number	Percent
White	3,394	89.6%
Black or African American	47	1.2%
American Indian and Alaska Native	22	0.6%
Asian	19	0.5%
Native Hawaiian and Other Pacific Islander	0	0.0%
Some other race	56	1.5%
Two or more races	250	6.6%
Hispanic or Latino (of any race)	149	3.9%

=== 2010 census ===
As of the census of 2010, there were 3,804 people, 1,561 households, and 966 families living in the city. The population density was 1,921.2 inhabitants per square mile (741.8/km^{2}). There were 1,674 housing units at an average density of 845.5 per square mile (326.4/km^{2}). The racial makeup of the city was 96.0% White, 1.0% African American, 0.5% Native American, 0.4% Asian, 0.1% Pacific Islander, 0.6% from other races, and 1.5% from two or more races. Hispanic or Latino of any race were 2.3% of the population.

There were 1,561 households, of which 32.4% had children under the age of 18 living with them, 44.3% were married couples living together, 13.6% had a female householder with no husband present, 4.0% had a male householder with no wife present, and 38.1% were non-families. 33.1% of all households were made up of individuals, and 12.1% had someone living alone who was 65 years of age or older. The average household size was 2.33 and the average family size was 2.97.

The median age in the city was 38.7 years. 23.8% of residents were under the age of 18; 9.4% were between the ages of 18 and 24; 24.2% were from 25 to 44; 26.6% were from 45 to 64; and 15.9% were 65 years of age or older. The gender makeup of the city was 46.7% male and 53.3% female.

=== 2000 census ===
As of the census of 2000, there were 3,933 people, 1,506 households, and 1,018 families living in the city. The population density was 1,897.9 inhabitants per square mile (732.8/km^{2}). There were 1,593 housing units at an average density of 768.7 per square mile (296.8/km^{2}). The racial makeup of the city was 96.77% White, 0.46% African American, 0.48% Native American, 0.36% Asian, 0.66% from other races, and 1.27% from two or more races. Hispanic or Latino of any race were 1.65% of the population.

There were 1,506 households, out of which 35.7% had children under the age of 18 living with them, 50.7% were married couples living together, 13.1% had a female householder with no husband present, and 32.4% were non-families. 26.8% of all households were made up of individuals, and 10.0% had someone living alone who was 65 years of age or older. The average household size was 2.48 and the average family size was 3.01.

In the city, the population was spread out, with 26.5% under the age of 18, 7.9% from 18 to 24, 30.2% from 25 to 44, 19.8% from 45 to 64, and 15.7% who were 65 years of age or older. The median age was 36 years. For every 100 females, there were 91.3 males. For every 100 females age 18 and over, there were 87.5 males.

The median income for a household in the city was $39,590, and the median income for a family was $44,519. Males had a median income of $35,785 versus $26,397 for females. The per capita income for the city was $16,982. About 1.4% of families and 6.1% of the population were below the poverty line, including 2.6% of those under age 18 and 18.8% of those age 65 or over.

== Education ==
K-12 Students are served by Plainwell Community Schools. There are two high schools, Plainwell High School, and Renaissance High School. Renaissance is the alternative education high school. There is only one middle school, Plainwell Middle School. The school district has three elementary schools. They are Cooper Elementary, Gilkey Elementary, and Starr Elementary.

Michigan Career and Technical Institute is also located nearby.

== Notable people ==
- Allan L. Benson, author and newspaper editor
- Jack Conklin, American football offensive tackle
- Dave Coverly, syndicated cartoonist
- Mallory Comerford, competitive swimmer
- Ed Gale, actor
- Narada Michael Walden, singer, songwriter, musician, and record producer
- Joseph Keckler, singer, songwriter, musician
- Bob Topp, American football end

== See also ==
- Impact of the 2019–20 coronavirus pandemic on the meat industry in the United States
