= Plainwell Community Schools =

School district in Michigan

Address
- 600 School Drive Plainwell, Allegan, Michigan, 49080; United States

District information
- Grades: Pre-Kindergarten-12
- Superintendent: Matthew Montange
- Schools: 6
- Budget: $49,121,000 2022-2023 expenditures
- NCES District ID: 2628530

Students and staff
- Students: 2,634 (2024-2025)
- Teachers: 143.39 (on an FTE basis) (2024-2025)
- Staff: 350.17 FTE (2024-2025)
- Student–teacher ratio: 18.37 (2024-2025)

Other information
- Website: www.plainwellschools.org

Plainwell Community Schools is a public school district in West Michigan. In Allegan County, it serves Plainwell and parts of the townships of Gun Plain, Martin, and Otsego. In Kalamazoo County, it serves parts of Alamao Township, Cooper Township, and Richland Township. In Barry County, it serves parts of Orangeville Township and Prairieville Township.

== History ==
The first school in the district boundaries was a red one-room schoolhouse built in 1843. A brick public school opened in Plainwell village in fall 1870, which housed several graded classrooms. The high school had been established the year prior.

A new high school, designed by Kalamazoo architect Ernest Batterson, opened in 1922.

A junior high school was built on Starr Road in 1955. After an expansion, it became Plainwell High School in fall 1961. Extensive additions were built around 1972. Plainwell Middle School also opened in 1972. Its architect was Daverman Associates of Grand Rapids.

Additions and renovations to district buildings, including a new science wing at the high school, were completed in 2001. After the renovation, the school's 304-seat auditorium had only 212 seats, causing concern for the performing arts teachers. A new auditorium was built in 2010 that has 750 seats.

== Schools ==
Schools in Plainwell Community Schools district
School	Address	Notes
Plainwell High School	684 Starr Road, Plainwell	Grades 9-12
Plainwell Middle School	720 Brigham Street, Plainwell	Grades 6-8
Cooper Elementary	7559 North 14th Street, Kalamazoo	Grades PreK-5
Gilkey Elementary	707 South Woodhams Street, Plainwell	Grades PreK-5
Starr Elementary	601 School Drive, Plainwell	Grades PreK-5
Renaissance High School	798 E. Bridge Street, Plainwell	Grades 9-12
