= UCLA Law COVID Behind Bars Data Project =

Initiative that tracks COVID-19 in carceral facilities

The UCLA Law COVID Behind Bars Data Project is an initiative of the UCLA School of Law that tracks the spread and impact of the COVID-19 pandemic in American prisons, immigration detention centers, jails, and youth detention facilities. Using custom web-scraping programs that automatically collect time-series, facility-level data reported by government agencies, the Project collects and reports data including the numbers of cases, deaths, tests, and vaccination rates among both incarcerated people and staff in more than 1,700 carceral facilities from more than 100 online sources.

The Project also collects and maintains unique datasets of facility populations, releases, data transparency, court decisions and legal filings, prison policies, and organizing efforts. Some or all of these data are available on the Project's website, the Centers for Disease Control and Prevention's tracker for COVID-19 in US Correctional and Detention Facilities, GitHub, Google Sheets, and via data visualizations posted on social media. Project staff also regularly produce commentary related to decarceration, vaccination, and carceral data transparency.

== History ==
The Project was founded in March 2020 by UCLA School of Law Professor Sharon Dolovich, who is also faculty director of the school's Prison Law and Policy Program. UCLA School of Law Professor Aaron Littman, at the time a Binder Clinical Teaching Fellow at UCLA Law, joined the Project as Deputy Director in May 2020.

The initiative was inspired by a prisoners' rights listserv in which both faculty members participate; when attorneys began sharing information about canceled client visits in local prisons due to the coronavirus pandemic, Professor Dolovich and her research assistant Keegan Hawkins began tracking, via a spreadsheet, the information related to visitation. Very soon after, Corene Kendrick, then a staff attorney with the Prison Law Office in Berkeley, put out a request on the listserv for someone to create an open-source spreadsheet to which advocates could post their COVID-related filings, thus enabling the sharing of work as advocates for incarcerated people mobilized on behalf of their clients. In response, Dolovich and Hawkins posted their spreadsheet with an additional tab for "population-reduction requests." As listserv users began expressing needs for additional information tracking, the Project and its growing team of volunteers began to add categories related to releases, youth facilities, grassroots organizing and mutual aid efforts, immigration detention, testing, deaths, and court filings and court orders. COVID-19 cases reported on carcel agency websites were also tracked manually in a separate tab.

The initiative was entirely volunteer-run until the first staff were hired in summer 2020 to more systematically track COVID-19 data in carceral settings. The Project now consists of eleven staff members and more than 100 volunteer researchers.

== Funding ==
The Project received its initial funding from the Vital Projects Fund, part of the Proteus Fund. It also received support through a partnership with the Centers for Disease Control and Prevention. The Project has since received funding from Arnold Ventures, the Langeloth Foundation, the Rosenberg Foundation, and the UCLA Luskin Institute on Inequality and Democracy.

== Impact ==
The data collected by the Project is the primary source for the Centers for Disease Control and Prevention's public tracker for Confirmed COVID-19 Cases and Deaths in US Correctional and Detention Facilities.

The Project's staff and data have been widely cited in news reports and fact sheets as well as open letters and public testimony that support advocacy efforts related to COVID-19 in carceral settings.

Academic researchers have relied on the Project's data to conduct and publish public health research in publications such as the Centers for Disease Control and Prevention's Morbidity and Mortality Weekly Report, JAMA, the American Journal of Preventive Medicine, and medRXiv preprint.

The PrisonPandemic Project at the University of California, Irvine relies on the Project's data to display information about COVID-19 cases and deaths in California prisons.
