= Michigan Career and Technical Institute =

- Established: 1944
- Location: Plainwell, Michigan, United States; 42.5043°N 85.516°W
- Website: at Michigan.gov

Michigan Career and Technical Institute (MCTI) is a public vocational school in Plainwell, Michigan. It is located on 72 acres (29 ha) of land with 700 feet (210 m) of accessible frontage on Pine Lake. The school is an extension of the Michigan Department of Health and Human Services which works with Michigan Rehabilitative Services in order to serve the citizens of Michigan by rehabilitating and/or training students who come from poorer communities, are recovering addicts, veterans, or have disabilities, for employment in occupations that are relevant in today's job market.

== History ==
MCTI was founded in 1944 by the W. K. Kellogg Foundation which leased the facilities to the State of Michigan in order to rehabilitate returning World War II veterans and other Michigan citizens. The property and facilities were deeded to the state of Michigan in 1947. In 1952, the Michigan Board of Education was established as a state institution and named Michigan Veteran's Vocational School. The name changed in 1959 to Michigan Rehabilitation Institute and a 350-bed dormitory was constructed in 1964. The name was changed again in 1968 to State Technical Institute and Rehabilitation Center (STIRC) and, in 1971, the first female student was enrolled. 1974 saw the addition of a health and recreation complex, which features a library, gymnasium, Olympic-sized indoor swimming pool, weight room, archery range, and even a bowling alley. In 1995, the name was changed once again to Michigan Career and Technical Institute (MCTI), what it is known as today. The Pine Lake Family Center was built in 1999 providing housing and daycare for those with families attending MCTI.

== Academics ==
The school is accredited by the North Central Association on Accreditation and School Improvement (NCA CASI), as well as the Commission on Accreditation of Rehabilitation Facilities (CARF). MCTI is operated under the Michigan Department of Health and Human Services.

== Campus ==
The campus consists of one main building which contains the student dormitories, the majority of the classrooms, as well as the cafeteria and indoor leisure activities; and several smaller peripheral buildings which include the Grounds Maintenance classroom and the Pine Lake Apartments. The surrounding grounds feature a lakeside frontage, a baseball diamond, basketball court, tennis court and other outdoor fun time areas.

== Student life ==
The students are represented by a student government consisting of the Student Council (representatives from each course), the Hall Senate (representatives from each residence hall, who also act in a role of Resident Advisors in other colleges), and the Student Court (which acts as a court of second instance). The Veterans League, though not a part of the Student Government, per se, is also very influential in student life.

Approximately 500 students attend MCTI at any given time. They also host a summer camp in July called the Pine Lake Experience.
