= Plainwell High School =

High school in Plainwell, Allegan County, Michigan

Location
- 684 Starr Road; Plainwell, Allegan County, Michigan 49080; United States; 42.437°N 85.654°W

Information
- School type: Public High School
- Motto: "Preparing students for success through academic excellence and strength of character"
- School district: Plainwell Community Schools
- Superintendent: Matt Montange
- Principal: Marvin Taylor
- Teaching staff: 39.54 (FTE)
- Grades: 9–12
- Gender: Co-ed
- Enrollment: 828 (2024–2025)
- Student to teacher ratio: 20.94
- Colors: Royal Blue; White
- Athletics: MHSAA Class B
- Athletics conference: Wolverine Conference
- Nickname: Trojans
- Rival: Otsego High School
- Yearbook: Troan
- Feeder schools: Plainwell Middle School
- Athletic Director: Melissa Preston
- Website: Plainwell High School

Student assessments
- 2021–22 school year Change vs. prior year

M-STEP 11th grade proficiency rates (Science / Social Studies)
- Advanced %: 29.4 / 13.1
- Proficient %: 31.9 / 34.4
- PR. Proficient %: 11.9 / –
- Not Proficient %: 26.9 / ≤5

Average test scores
- SAT Total: 1019.4 (▲ +17.1)

Plainwell High School is a high school located in Plainwell, Michigan. The school is in a suburban school district just outside Kalamazoo, Michigan and is located in Allegan County. It is part of Plainwell Community Schools.
