= Breckenridge Community Schools =

School district in Michigan

Address
- 700 Wright Street Breckenridge, Gratiot County, Michigan, 48615; United States

District information
- Motto: Caring people committed to excellence.
- Grades: PreKindergarten–12
- Superintendent: Wade Slavik
- Schools: 2
- Budget: $14,953,000 2022–2023 expenditures
- NCES District ID: 2606630

Students and staff
- Students: 634 (2024–2025)
- Teachers: 37.2 (on an FTE basis) (2024–2025)
- Staff: 61.26 FTE (2024–2025)
- Student–teacher ratio: 17.04 (2024–2025)
- District mascot: Huskies

Other information
- Website: www.breckhuskies.org

Breckenridge Community Schools is a public school district in Central Michigan. In Gratiot County, it serves Breckenridge and parts of the townships of Bethany, Emerson, Lafayette, and Wheeler. In Midland County, it serves parts of the townships of Greendale, Jasper, Lee, Mt. Haley, and Porter. In Saginaw County, it serves parts of Chapin Township and Marion Township.

== History ==
Breckenridge's first school was built in 1882 and had two classrooms. The first high school class graduated in 1893, the same year that the district's students were divided into grades. A dedicated high school was built in 1916.

In 1936, a new high school was built on East Summit Street. Later known as West Elementary, it became a community education center in 1995 before closing in 2009. It was demolished in 2013.

East Elementary was built in 1954. The current middle/high school was built in 1966. The current elementary school opened in January 1995, adjacent to East Elementary. Voters passed a $14.95 million bond issue in 2020 to tear down the old East Elementary section and construct a new addition to the 1995 elementary school in its place.

== Schools ==
Schools in Breckenridge Community Schools district
School	Address	Notes
Breckenridge Middle/High School	700 Wright Street, Breckenridge	Grades 6–12. Built 1966.
Breckenridge Elementary	515 Summit Street, Breckenridge	Grades PreK-5. Built 1995.
