= Bullock Creek School District =

School district in Michigan

Address
- 1420 South Badour Midland, Midland County, Michigan, 48640; United States
- Coordinates: 43°34′12.7″N 84°17′37.6″W

District information
- Grades: Pre-Kindergarten-12
- Superintendent: Shawn Hale
- Schools: 5
- Budget: $27,249,000 2022-2023 expenditures
- NCES District ID: 2607320

Students and staff
- Students: 1,673 (2024-2025)
- Teachers: 100.77 (on an FTE basis) (2024-2025)
- Staff: 224.09 FTE (2024-2025)
- Student–teacher ratio: 16.6 (2024-2025)

Other information
- Website: www.bcreek.k12.mi.us

Bullock Creek School District is a public school district in Midland County, Michigan. It serves part of Midland and parts of the townships of Greendale, Homer, Ingersoll, Lee, Midland, and Mt. Haley.

== History ==
Bullock Creek School District has existed since at least 1898, when a local newspaper mentioned the Bullock Creek schoolhouse. The district opened a new school building in fall 1933. As of 1938, the school had three teachers and 139 students. An expansion and renovation of the school was approved in 1948. "Designed by St. Clair Pardee, St. Johns architect, the new school addition will be California style with slanting roofs," the Bay City Times noted at the time. This building is currently known as Bullock Creek Elementary.

Several other small districts consolidated with the district in 1960-1961.

The district was without a high school until 1963 and sent its students to Midland High School. Midland Public Schools' announcement that it would stop taking nonresident students from several districts, including Bullock Creek, prompted Bullock Creek to establish its own high school. In 1961, voters in the district voted overwhelmingly to fund construction of a junior high school at 1420 South Badour that could be expanded into a high school. The architect was Saginaw firm Prine, Toshach & Spears.

In 1962, a 17-classroom addition was planned for the junior high school to house the high school. It opened in fall 1963.

A stand-alone junior high school building was constructed in 1972 and designed by the same architect as the high school.

== Schools ==
Schools in Bullock Creek School District
| School | Address | Notes |
|---|---|---|
| Bullock Creek High School | 1420 S. Badour, Midland | Grades 9–12 |
| Bullock Creek Middle School | 644 S. Badour, Midland | Grades 6–8 |
| Bullock Creek Elementary | 1037 Poseyville, Midland | Grades PreK-2. Built 1932. |
| Pine River Elementary | 1894 East Pine River Rd., Midland | Grades 3-5. Built 1966. |
| Floyd Elementary | 725 S. Eight Mile, Midland | Grades K-5 |
