= Perrine Road Bridge =

- North Saginaw Road-Salt River Bridge
- U.S. National Register of Historic Places
- Interactive map
- Location: Perrine Rd. over Sturgeon Cr., Larkin Township, Michigan
- Coordinates: 43°40′22″N 84°16′38″W
- Area: less than one acre
- Built: 1920
- Built by: Sarnia Bridge Company
- Architect: Michigan State Highway Department
- Architectural style: Parker Pony Truss
- MPS: Highway Bridges of Michigan MPS
- NRHP reference No.: 99001532
- Added to NRHP: December 17, 1999

The Perrine Road Bridge (formerly the North Saginaw Road-Salt River Bridge) is a bridge carrying North Saginaw Road over Sturgeon Creek in Larkin Township, Michigan. It was listed on the National Register of Historic Places in 1999. The bridge was moved in 2001 from its location at the time of nomination (North Saginaw Rd. over the Salt River) to the present location, carrying Perrine Road over Sturgeon Creek.

== History ==
This bridge was constructed in 1920 in St. Clair County, to carry what was then U.S. 25 (and is now M-3 over the Belle River. The bridge was constructed by the Sarnia Bridge Company of Sarnia, Ontario, from plans drawn by the Michigan State Highway Department. The Sarnia Bridge Company's name is also prominent listed on the plans, implying that the firm may have also been involved in the design of the bridge. The Belle River Bridge quickly became inadequate for the traffic flows of U.S. 25, and in 1932 it was moved to Midland County, where U.S. 10 was being relocated, to carry U.S. 10 over te Salt River. A number of parts of the bridge were revamped, and the roadway was widened from 20 feet to 30 feet.

The bridge continued to serve traffic until U.S. 10 was again rerouted, with the old alignment renamed "Saginaw Road." The bridge was moved again in 2001 from its North Saginaw Rd./ Salt River location to Perrine Road over Sturgeon Creek.

== Description ==
The North Saginaw Road Bridge is a steel, eight-panel, riveted Parker Pony Truss bridge. The bridge is 115 feet long, with 109-foot span. Narrow sidewalks on each side were made from raised steel plates form narrow sidewalks on each side of the 30-foot roadway. The deck is made from steel plates. The upper chord of the bridge is constructed from formed by back-to-back channels tied with lacing, while the lower chord is made from two pairs of back-to-back angles connected by lacing. Vertical and diagonal members are made from two pairs of back-to-back angles. Railings also made of two angles end at concrete corner posts. The floor beams and stringers are formed from I-beams. The bridge sits on concrete abutments at either end, flanked with concrete wingwalls.

This bridge is one of the first three Parker pony truss bridges built in Michigan, and is one of the first bridges to have a welded steel plate floor, which was added after the bridge was moved.
