= Mills Township, Michigan =

Mills Township is the name of some places in the U.S. state of Michigan:

- Mills Township, Midland County, Michigan
- Mills Township, Ogemaw County, Michigan

See also:

- Bay Mills Township, Michigan
- Mills Township (disambiguation)
