= Mill Township =

Mill Township may refer to the following townships in the United States:

- Mill Township, Tuscarawas County, Ohio
- Mill Township, Grant County, Indiana

== See also ==
- Mills Township (disambiguation)
