= Sturgeon Creek (Michigan) =

Coordinates: 43°37′40″N 84°15′44″W

Sturgeon Creek is located in Midland County. It has its origin in Section 22 of Hope Township, and makes its way southwesterly and southeasterly through Lincoln Township and Larkin Township and into the western side of the city of Midland, emptying into the Tittabawassee River.
