= Geneva Township, Midland County, Michigan =

Geneva Township, Michigan
- Civil township
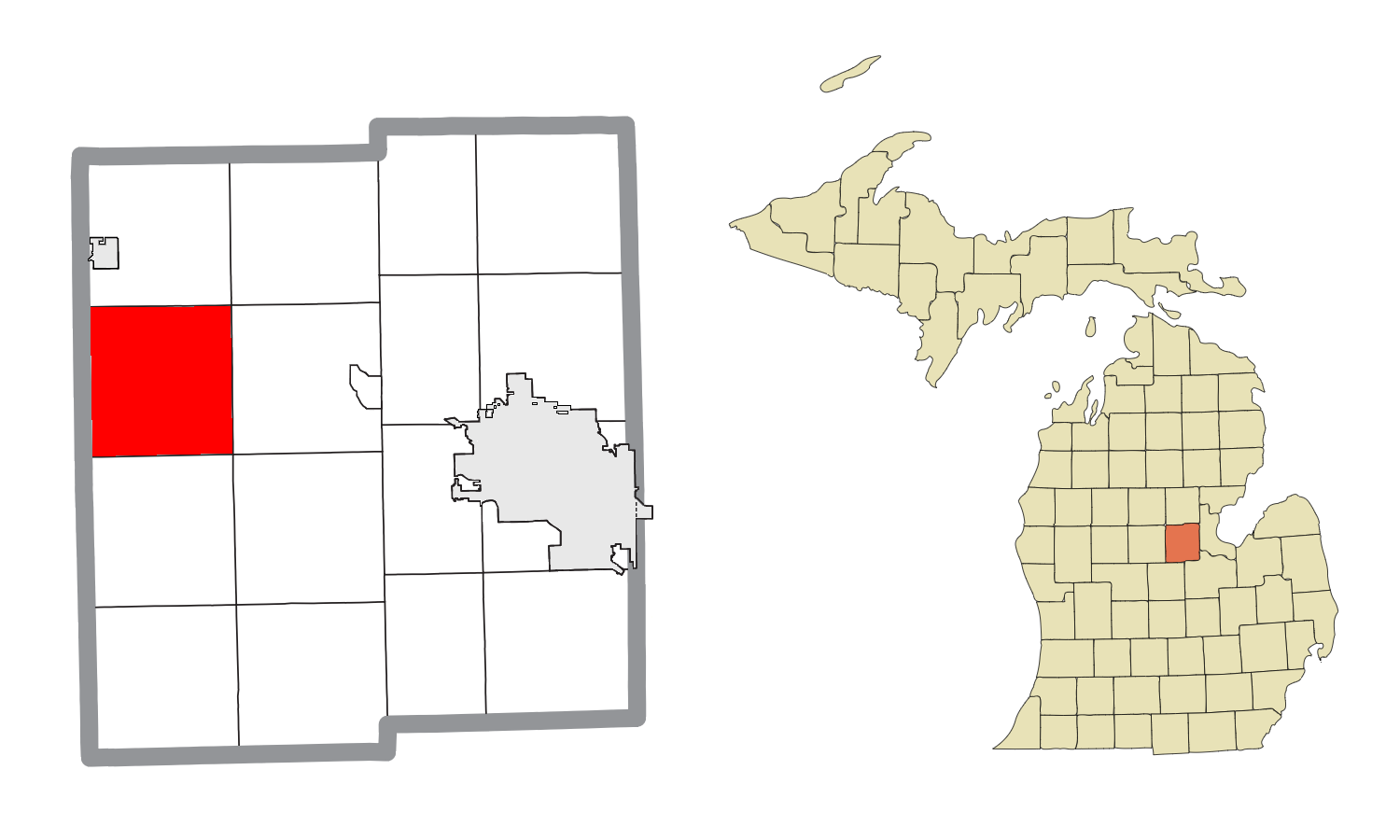
- Location within Midland County and the state of Michigan

- Location within Michigan Location within the United States
- Coordinates: 43°41′01″N 84°32′53″W
- Country: United States
- State: Michigan
- County: Midland
- Established: 1873

Government
  - Supervisor: Josh Murray
  - Clerk: Carole Murray

Area
  - Total: 36.0 sq mi (93 km^{2})
  - Land: 35.5 sq mi (92 km^{2})
  - Water: 0.5 sq mi (1.3 km^{2})
- Elevation: 679 ft (207 m)

Population (2020)
  - Total: 1,065
  - Density: 30/sq mi (12/km^{2})
- Time zone: UTC-5 (Eastern (EST))
  - Summer (DST): UTC-4 (EDT)
- ZIP Codes: 48618 (Coleman); 48883 (Shepherd)
- Area code: 989
- FIPS code: 26-111-31820
- GNIS feature ID: 1626343
- Website: genevatwpmidlandcounty.com

Geneva Township is a civil township of Midland County in the U.S. state of Michigan. The population was 1,065 at the 2020 census.

== Communities ==
- North Bradley is an unincorporated community in the township at 43°42′41″N 84°29′24″W. A post office operated from November 5, 1873, until April 27, 1984. The settlement was also called Buttonville or Button, for William R. Button, who was closely associated with its development.

== Geography ==
The township is in western Midland County, bordered to the west by Isabella County. According to the United States Census Bureau, the township has a total area of 36.0 square miles (93 km^{2}), of which 35.5 square miles (92 km^{2}) are land and 0.5 square miles (1.3 km^{2}), or 1.48%, are water. The Salt River, a tributary of the Tittabawassee River and part of the Saginaw River watershed, flows across the township from west to east.

== Demographics ==
Historical population
Census	Pop.	Note	%±
1880	237		—
1890	458		93.2%
1900	584		27.5%
1910	699		19.7%
1920	721		3.1%
1930	620		−14.0%
1940	613		−1.1%
1950	623		1.6%
1960	717		15.1%
1970	683		−4.7%
1980	1,157		69.4%
1990	1,048		−9.4%
2000	1,137		8.5%
2010	1,056		−7.1%
2020	1,065		0.9%
U.S. Decennial Census

As of the census of 2000, there were 1,137 people, 436 households, and 340 families residing in the township. The population density was 31.6 inhabitants per square mile (12.2/km^{2}). There were 469 housing units at an average density of 13.0 per square mile (5.0/km^{2}). The racial makeup of the township was 98.50% White, 0.09% African American, 0.79% Native American, and 0.62% from two or more races. Hispanic or Latino of any race were 1.58% of the population.

There were 436 households, out of which 31.0% had children under the age of 18 living with them, 67.9% were married couples living together, 6.4% had a female householder with no husband present, and 21.8% were non-families. 17.7% of all households were made up of individuals, and 6.0% had someone living alone who was 65 years of age or older. The average household size was 2.61 and the average family size was 2.94.

In the township the population was spread out, with 25.0% under the age of 18, 6.9% from 18 to 24, 29.2% from 25 to 44, 25.9% from 45 to 64, and 13.1% who were 65 years of age or older. The median age was 38 years. For every 100 females, there were 104.1 males. For every 100 females age 18 and over, there were 103.1 males.

The median income for a household in the township was $41,908, and the median income for a family was $43,906. Males had a median income of $35,469 versus $22,500 for females. The per capita income for the township was $17,479. About 7.3% of families and 8.5% of the population were below the poverty line, including 8.3% of those under age 18 and 5.6% of those age 65 or over.
