= Warren Township, Michigan =

- Civil township
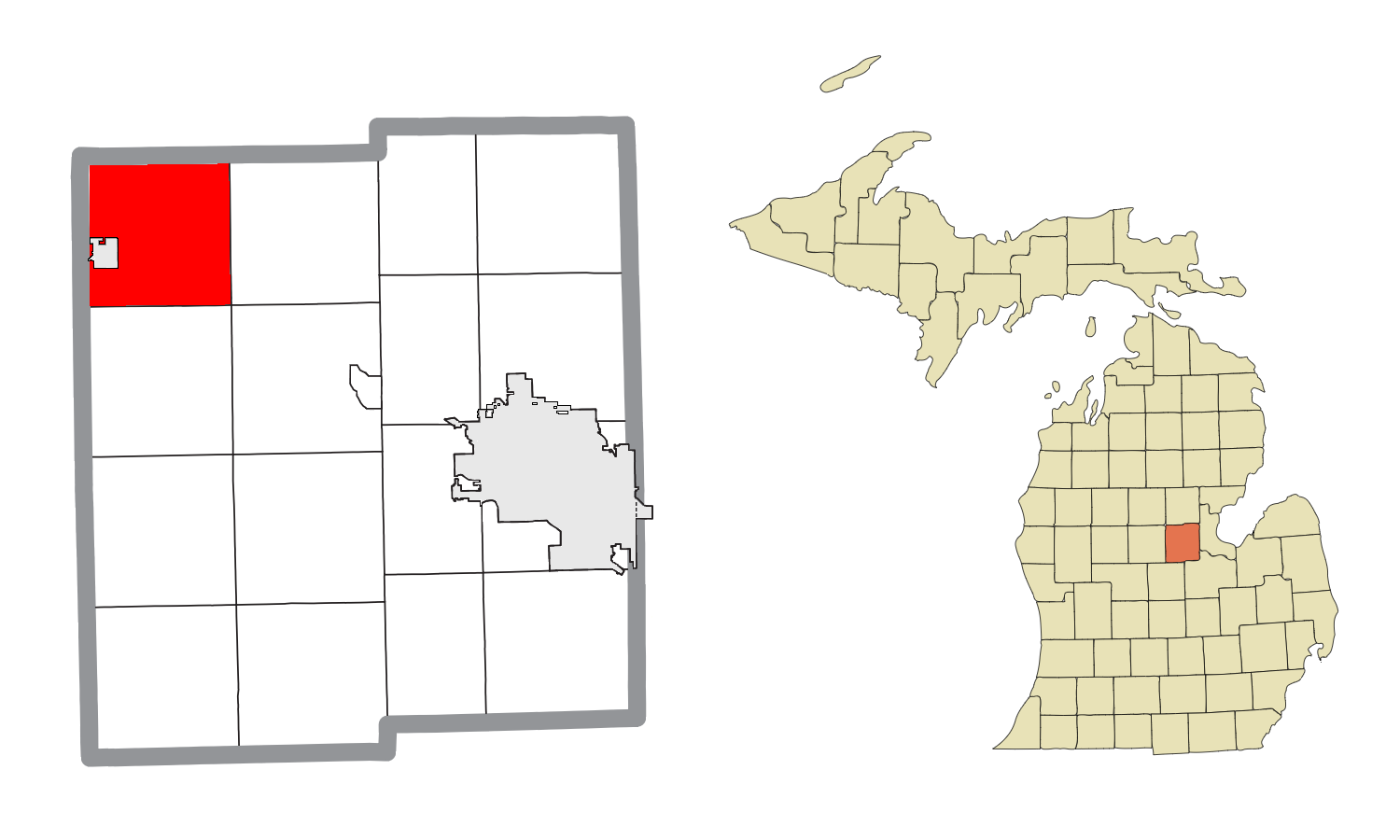
- Location within Midland County and the state of Michigan

- Location within Michigan Location within the United States
- Coordinates: 43°46′18″N 84°32′33″W
- Country: United States
- State: Michigan
- County: Midland

Government
  - Supervisor: Denny Allen
  - Clerk: Linda Anthony

Area
  - Total: 34.91 sq mi (90.4 km^{2})
  - Land: 34.76 sq mi (90.0 km^{2})
  - Water: 0.15 sq mi (0.39 km^{2})
- Elevation: 728 ft (222 m)

Population (2020)
  - Total: 2,040
  - Density: 58.7/sq mi (22.7/km^{2})
- Time zone: UTC-5 (Eastern (EST))
  - Summer (DST): UTC-4 (EDT)
- ZIP Codes: 48618 (Coleman); 48612 (Beaverton)
- Area code: 989
- FIPS code: 26-111-84020
- GNIS feature ID: 1627214
- Website: warrentownshipmi.com

Warren Township is a civil township of Midland County in the U.S. state of Michigan. The population was 2,040 at the 2020 census. The township surrounds the city of Coleman, but the two are administered autonomously.

== Geography ==
The township is in the northwest corner of Midland County, bordered to the north by Gladwin County, to the west by Isabella County, and at its northwest corner by Clare County. The city of Coleman is surrounded by the western part of the township.

According to the United States Census Bureau, Warren Township has a total area of 34.9 square miles (90 km^{2}), of which 34.8 square miles (90 km^{2}) are land and 0.1 square miles (0.3 km^{2}), or 0.42%, are water.

== Demographics ==
Historical population
Census	Pop.	Note	%±
1880	300		—
1890	903		201.0%
1900	1,874		107.5%
1910	809		−56.8%
1920	844		4.3%
1930	655		−22.4%
1940	792		20.9%
1950	872		10.1%
1960	1,178		35.1%
1970	1,283		8.9%
1980	1,846		43.9%
1990	1,812		−1.8%
2000	2,107		16.3%
2010	2,119		0.6%
2020	2,040		−3.7%
U.S. Decennial Census

As of the census of 2000, there were 2,107 people, 769 households, and 606 families residing in the township. The population density was 60.2 inhabitants per square mile (23.2/km^{2}). There were 819 housing units at an average density of 23.4 per square mile (9.0/km^{2}). The racial makeup of the township was 97.91% White, 0.28% Native American, 0.19% Asian, 0.09% Pacific Islander, 0.19% from other races, and 1.33% from two or more races. Hispanic or Latino of any race were 0.76% of the population.

There were 769 households, out of which 36.3% had children under the age of 18 living with them, 69.1% were married couples living together, 6.4% had a female householder with no husband present, and 21.1% were non-families. 17.6% of all households were made up of individuals, and 8.5% had someone living alone who was 65 years of age or older. The average household size was 2.73 and the average family size was 3.09.

In the township the population was spread out, with 27.4% under the age of 18, 8.0% from 18 to 24, 28.3% from 25 to 44, 23.7% from 45 to 64, and 12.5% who were 65 years of age or older. The median age was 36 years. For every 100 females, there were 103.2 males. For every 100 females age 18 and over, there were 97.5 males.

The median income for a household in the township was $40,063, and the median income for a family was $47,014. Males had a median income of $35,677 versus $23,555 for females. The per capita income for the township was $16,928. About 6.4% of families and 9.0% of the population were below the poverty line, including 7.8% of those under age 18 and 18.4% of those age 65 or over.
