= Mills Township =

Mills Township may refer to:

- Mills Township, Illinois
- Mills Township, Midland County, Michigan
- Mills Township, Ogemaw County, Michigan
