= Midland Township, Michigan =

- Charter township
- Charter Township of Midland
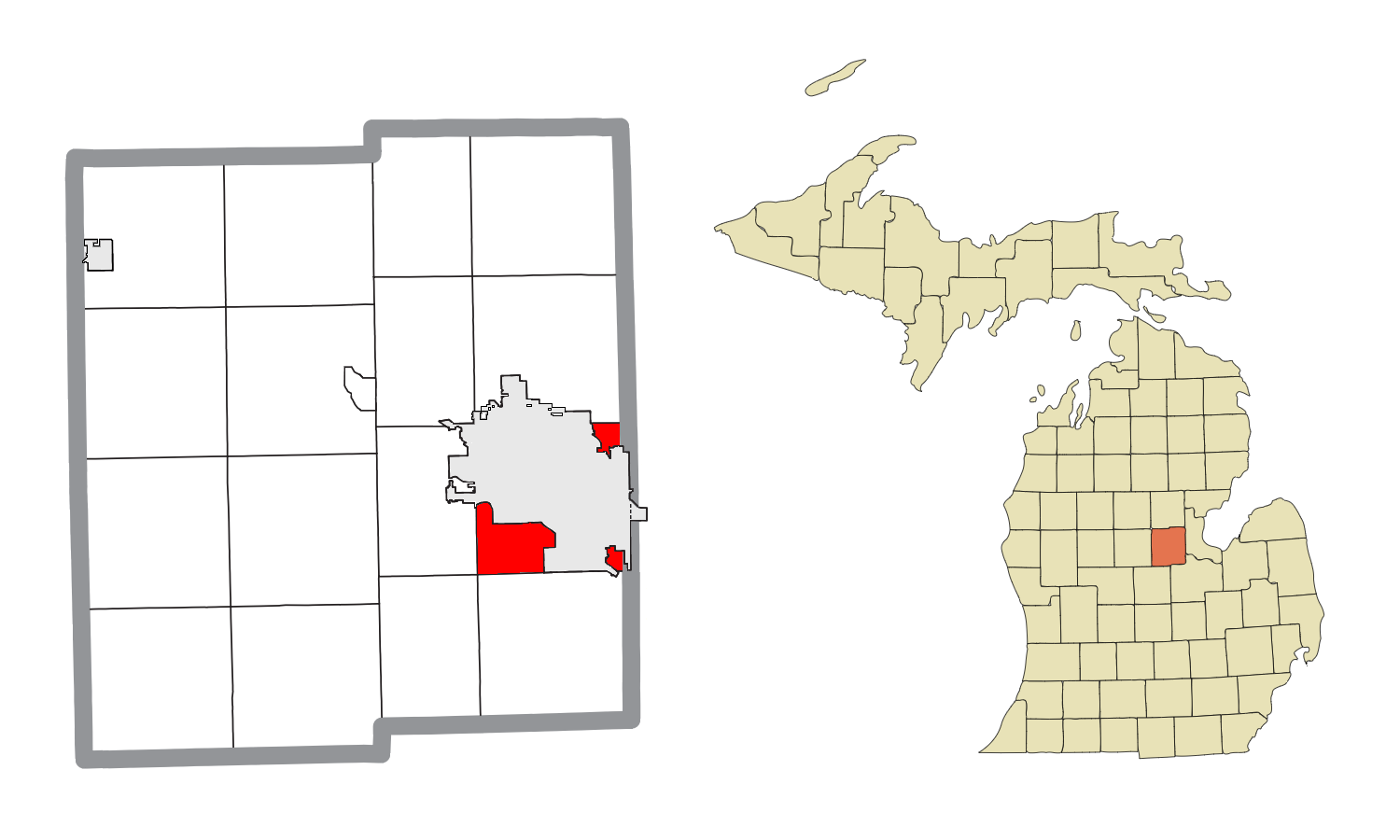
- Location within Midland County and the state of Michigan

- Location within Michigan Location within the United States
- Coordinates: 43°35′32″N 84°13′52″W
- Country: United States
- State: Michigan
- County: Midland

Government
  - Supervisor: Terry Holt
  - Clerk: Shelly Armstrong-Miller

Area
  - Total: 7.78 sq mi (20.2 km^{2})
  - Land: 7.19 sq mi (18.6 km^{2})
  - Water: 0.59 sq mi (1.5 km^{2})
- Elevation: 594 ft (181 m)

Population (2020)
  - Total: 2,223
  - Density: 309.3/sq mi (119.4/km^{2})
- Time zone: UTC-5 (Eastern (EST))
  - Summer (DST): UTC-4 (EDT)
- ZIP codes: 48640, 48642 (Midland); 48623 (Freeland)
- Area code: 989
- FIPS code: 26-111-53800
- GNIS feature ID: 1626737
- Website: www.midlandtownship.net

Midland Charter Township is a charter township of Midland County in the U.S. state of Michigan. The population was 2,223 at the 2020 census. The township consists of three non-contiguous segments adjacent to the city of Midland, and the township and city are administered autonomously.

== Geography ==
The township is in eastern Midland County, southwest, southeast, and northeast of the city of Midland. The northeast section of the township is bordered to the east by Bay County.

According to the United States Census Bureau, the township has a total area of 7.8 square miles (20 km^{2}), of which 7.2 square miles (19 km^{2}) are land and 0.6 square miles (1.6 km^{2}), or 7.55%, are water. The township is drained by the Tittabawassee River, which flows through the city of Midland and forms a portion of the township border.

== Government ==
The township's supervisor leads township board meetings, develops the township budget, is the legal representative of the township, appoints members to local bodies and assists the assessor in valuations; building department is responsible for plan review, issues permits, inspections, code enforcement and recordkeeping; the tax assessor discovers, records and values real estate and personal property to create an annual roll for township property taxes; the clerk keeps the records and papers of the township, registers eligible voters and conducts elections; the township treasurer collects taxes, has custody of township funds and generates financial reports concerning investments, receipts and expenditures to the township board and state.

== Demographics ==
Historical population
| Census | Pop. | Note | %± |
|---|---|---|---|
| 1870 | 1,616 | | — |
| 1880 | 2,294 | | 42.0% |
| 1890 | 1,020 | | −55.5% |
| 1900 | 1,057 | | 3.6% |
| 1910 | 1,023 | | −3.2% |
| 1920 | 1,636 | | 59.9% |
| 1930 | 1,209 | | −26.1% |
| 1940 | 3,442 | | 184.7% |
| 1950 | 5,320 | | 54.6% |
| 1960 | 2,268 | | −57.4% |
| 1970 | 2,521 | | 11.2% |
| 1980 | 2,389 | | −5.2% |
| 1990 | 2,221 | | −7.0% |
| 2000 | 2,297 | | 3.4% |
| 2010 | 2,287 | | −0.4% |
| 2020 | 2,223 | | −2.8% |
U.S. Decennial Census

As of the census of 2000, there were 2,297 people, 847 households, and 651 families residing in the township. The population density was 295.3 inhabitants per square mile (114.0/km^{2}). There were 876 housing units at an average density of 112.6 per square mile (43.5/km^{2}). The racial makeup of the township was 98.43% White, 0.39% African American, 0.35% Native American, 0.17% Asian, and 0.65% from two or more races. Hispanic or Latino of any race were 1.52% of the population.

There were 847 households, out of which 40.1% had children under the age of 18 living with them, 64.2% were married couples living together, 8.4% had a female householder with no husband present, and 23.1% were non-families. 19.0% of all households were made up of individuals, and 6.6% had someone living alone who was 65 years of age or older. The average household size was 2.71 and the average family size was 3.08.

In the township the population was spread out, with 29.8% under the age of 18, 6.1% from 18 to 24, 33.0% from 25 to 44, 22.2% from 45 to 64, and 9.0% who were 65 years of age or older. The median age was 35 years. For every 100 females, there were 98.5 males. For every 100 females age 18 and over, there were 96.5 males.

The median income for a household in the township was $50,327, and the median income for a family was $54,539. Males had a median income of $40,559 versus $24,500 for females. The per capita income for the township was $21,538. About 2.9% of families and 3.0% of the population were below the poverty line, including 3.0% of those under age 18 and 5.4% of those age 65 or over.
