= Lincoln Township, Midland County, Michigan =

Lincoln Township, Michigan
- Civil township
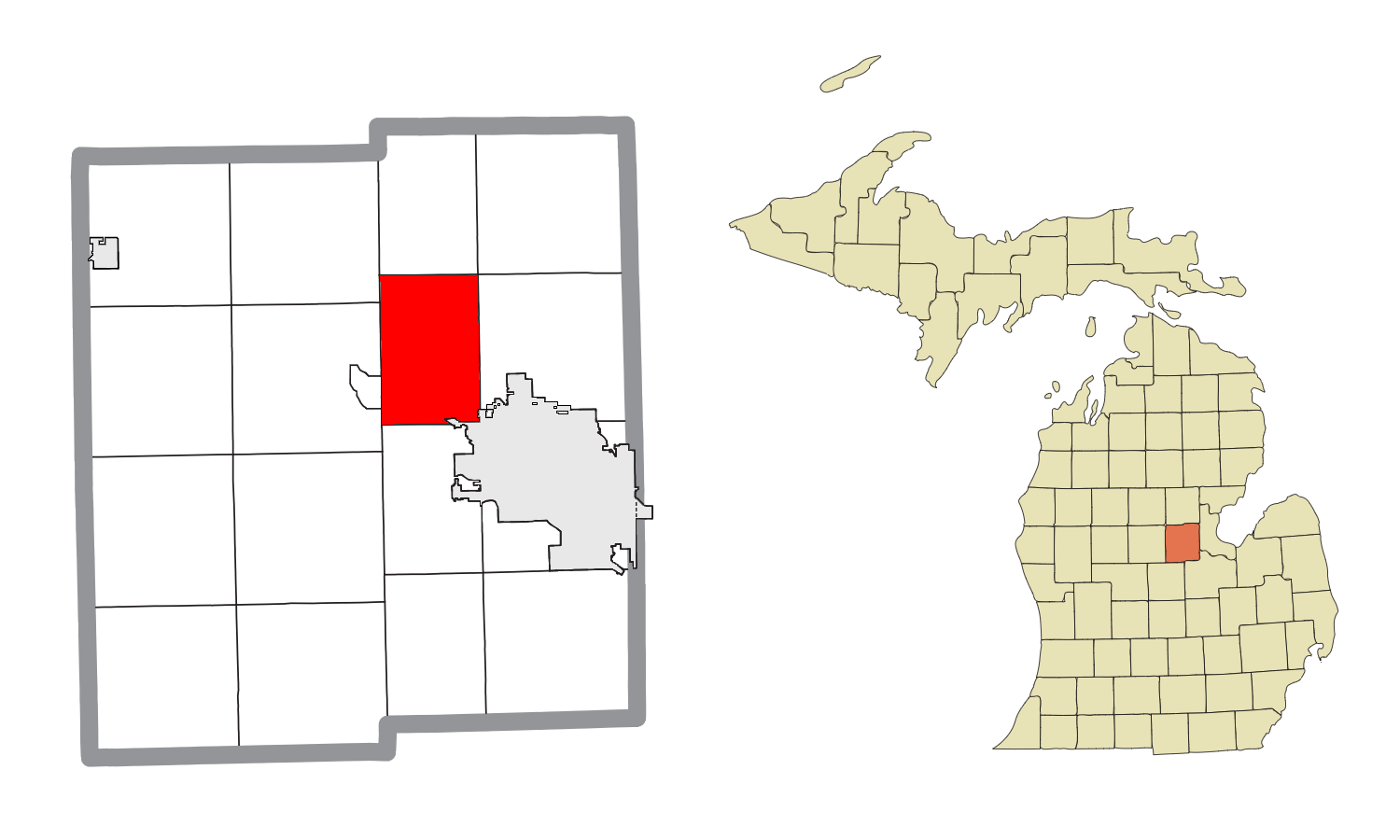
- Location within Midland County and the state of Michigan

- Location within Michigan Location within the United States
- Coordinates: 43°42′01″N 84°19′28″W
- Country: United States
- State: Michigan
- County: Midland

Government
  - Supervisor: Kevin Wray
  - Clerk: Mark Trinklein

Area
  - Total: 23.4 sq mi (61 km^{2})
  - Land: 23.3 sq mi (60 km^{2})
  - Water: 0.1 sq mi (0.26 km^{2})
- Elevation: 640 ft (195 m)

Population (2020)
  - Total: 2,497
  - Density: 107.3/sq mi (41.4/km^{2})
- Time zone: UTC-5 (Eastern (EST))
  - Summer (DST): UTC-4 (EDT)
- ZIP Codes: 48642 (Midland); 48628 (Hope); 48657 (Sanford)
- Area code: 989
- FIPS code: 26-111-47680
- GNIS feature ID: 1626623
- Website: www.lincoln-twp.org

Lincoln Township is a civil township of Midland County in the U.S. state of Michigan. The population was 2,497 at the 2020 census.

== Communities ==
- Averill is an unincorporated community in the southern part of the township at 43°39′56″N 84°20′31″W. It began as a lumbering settlement, with a saloon named "Red Keg", which was popularized in novels by Eugene Thwing: The Man from Red Keg, and The Redkeggers. A post office named "Averill's Station" was established on September 30, 1868, named after the first postmaster, Averill S. Harrison. It was shortened to Averill on June 2, 1883. It was platted in 1870.

== Geography ==
The township is in central Midland County, bordered to the southeast by the city of Midland, the county seat, and to the west by the village of Sanford. According to the U.S. Census Bureau, the township has a total area of 23.4 square miles (61 km^{2}), of which 23.3 square miles (60 km^{2}) are land and 0.1 square miles (0.3 km^{2}), or 0.41%, are water. The township is drained by tributaries of the Tittabawassee River, which crosses the township's southwest corner.

== Demographics ==
Historical population
| Census | Pop. | Note | %± |
|---|---|---|---|
| 1870 | 322 | | — |
| 1880 | 173 | | −46.3% |
| 1890 | 252 | | 45.7% |
| 1900 | 343 | | 36.1% |
| 1910 | 392 | | 14.3% |
| 1920 | 357 | | −8.9% |
| 1930 | 350 | | −2.0% |
| 1940 | 503 | | 43.7% |
| 1950 | 739 | | 46.9% |
| 1960 | 1,000 | | 35.3% |
| 1970 | 1,417 | | 41.7% |
| 1980 | 1,643 | | 15.9% |
| 1990 | 1,807 | | 10.0% |
| 2000 | 2,277 | | 26.0% |
| 2010 | 2,474 | | 8.7% |
| 2020 | 2,497 | | 0.9% |
U.S. Decennial Census

As of the census of 2000, there were 2,277 people, 838 households, and 648 families residing in the township. The population density was 97.3 inhabitants per square mile (37.6/km^{2}). There were 880 housing units at an average density of 37.6 per square mile (14.5/km^{2}). The racial makeup of the township was 98.42% White, 0.22% African American, 0.53% Asian, 0.13% from other races, and 0.70% from two or more races. Hispanic or Latino of any race were 0.88% of the population.

There were 838 households, out of which 37.0% had children under the age of 18 living with them, 67.1% were married couples living together, 6.3% had a female householder with no husband present, and 22.6% were non-families. 17.3% of all households were made up of individuals, and 4.3% had someone living alone who was 65 years of age or older. The average household size was 2.72 and the average family size was 3.07.

In the township the population was spread out, with 28.1% under the age of 18, 7.2% from 18 to 24, 31.5% from 25 to 44, 25.2% from 45 to 64, and 8.0% who were 65 years of age or older. The median age was 36 years. For every 100 females, there were 102.6 males. For every 100 females age 18 and over, there were 102.0 males.

The median income for a household in the township was $42,167, and the median income for a family was $47,448. Males had a median income of $40,913 versus $24,706 for females. The per capita income for the township was $19,168. About 6.6% of families and 7.6% of the population were below the poverty line, including 9.8% of those under age 18 and 9.5% of those age 65 or over.
