= Porter Township, Midland County, Michigan =

Porter Township, Michigan
- Civil township
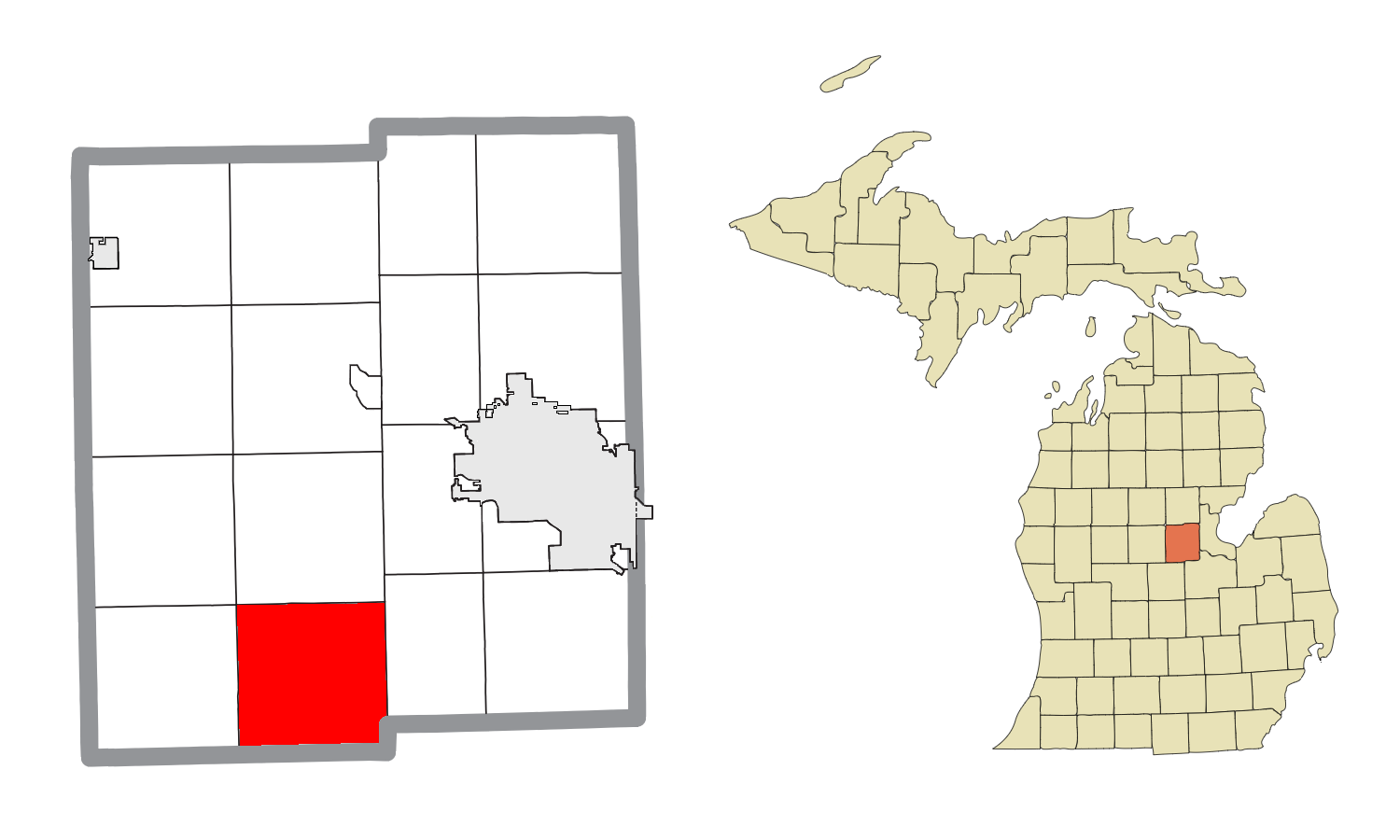
- Location within Midland County and the state of Michigan

- Location within Michigan Location within the United States
- Coordinates: 43°30′43″N 84°25′47″W
- Country: United States
- State: Michigan
- County: Midland

Government
  - Supervisor: Tom Corbat
  - Clerk: Marianne Corbat

Area
  - Total: 35.9 sq mi (93 km^{2})
  - Land: 35.7 sq mi (92 km^{2})
  - Water: 0.2 sq mi (0.52 km^{2})
- Elevation: 676 ft (206 m)

Population (2020)
  - Total: 1,270
  - Density: 35.6/sq mi (13.7/km^{2})
- Time zone: UTC-5 (Eastern (EST))
  - Summer (DST): UTC-4 (EDT)
- ZIP Codes: 48615 (Breckenridge); 48662 (Wheeler); 48640 (Midland); 48637 (Merrill); 48880 (St. Louis)
- Area code: 989
- FIPS code: 26-111-65740
- GNIS feature ID: 1626930

Porter Township is a civil township of Midland County in the U.S. state of Michigan. The population was 1,270 at the 2020 census.

== Geography ==
The township is in southern Midland County, bordered to the south by Gratiot County. According to the U.S. Census Bureau, the township has a total area of 35.9 square miles (93 km^{2}) of which 35.7 square miles (92 km^{2}) are land and 0.2 square miles (0.5 km^{2}), or 0.57%, are water.

== Demographics ==
Historical population
Census	Pop.	Note	%±
1870	82		—
1880	302		268.3%
1890	504		66.9%
1900	779		54.6%
1910	657		−15.7%
1920	711		8.2%
1930	660		−7.2%
1940	1,054		59.7%
1950	854		−19.0%
1960	857		0.4%
1970	899		4.9%
1980	1,113		23.8%
1990	1,140		2.4%
2000	1,270		11.4%
2010	1,277		0.6%
2020	1,270		−0.5%
U.S. Decennial Census

As of the census of 2000, there were 1,270 people, 460 households, and 361 families residing in the township. The population density was 35.5 inhabitants per square mile (13.7/km^{2}). There were 483 housing units at an average density of 13.5 per square mile (5.2/km^{2}). The racial makeup of the township was 97.40% White, 0.16% African American, 0.24% Native American, 0.08% Asian, 0.63% from other races, and 1.50% from two or more races. Hispanic or Latino of any race were 1.57% of the population.

There were 460 households, out of which 39.1% had children under the age of 18 living with them, 69.3% were married couples living together, 5.7% had a female householder with no husband present, and 21.5% were non-families. 18.0% of all households were made up of individuals, and 6.3% had someone living alone who was 65 years of age or older. The average household size was 2.75 and the average family size was 3.09.

In the township the population was spread out, with 28.4% under the age of 18, 6.7% from 18 to 24, 30.1% from 25 to 44, 24.7% from 45 to 64, and 10.1% who were 65 years of age or older. The median age was 36 years. For every 100 females, there were 106.2 males. For every 100 females age 18 and over, there were 103.4 males.

The median income for a household in the township was $37,315, and the median income for a family was $42,500. Males had a median income of $34,167 versus $21,688 for females. The per capita income for the township was $16,681. About 6.2% of families and 10.9% of the population were below the poverty line, including 16.5% of those under age 18 and 3.7% of those age 65 or over.
