= Ingersoll Township, Michigan =

- Civil township
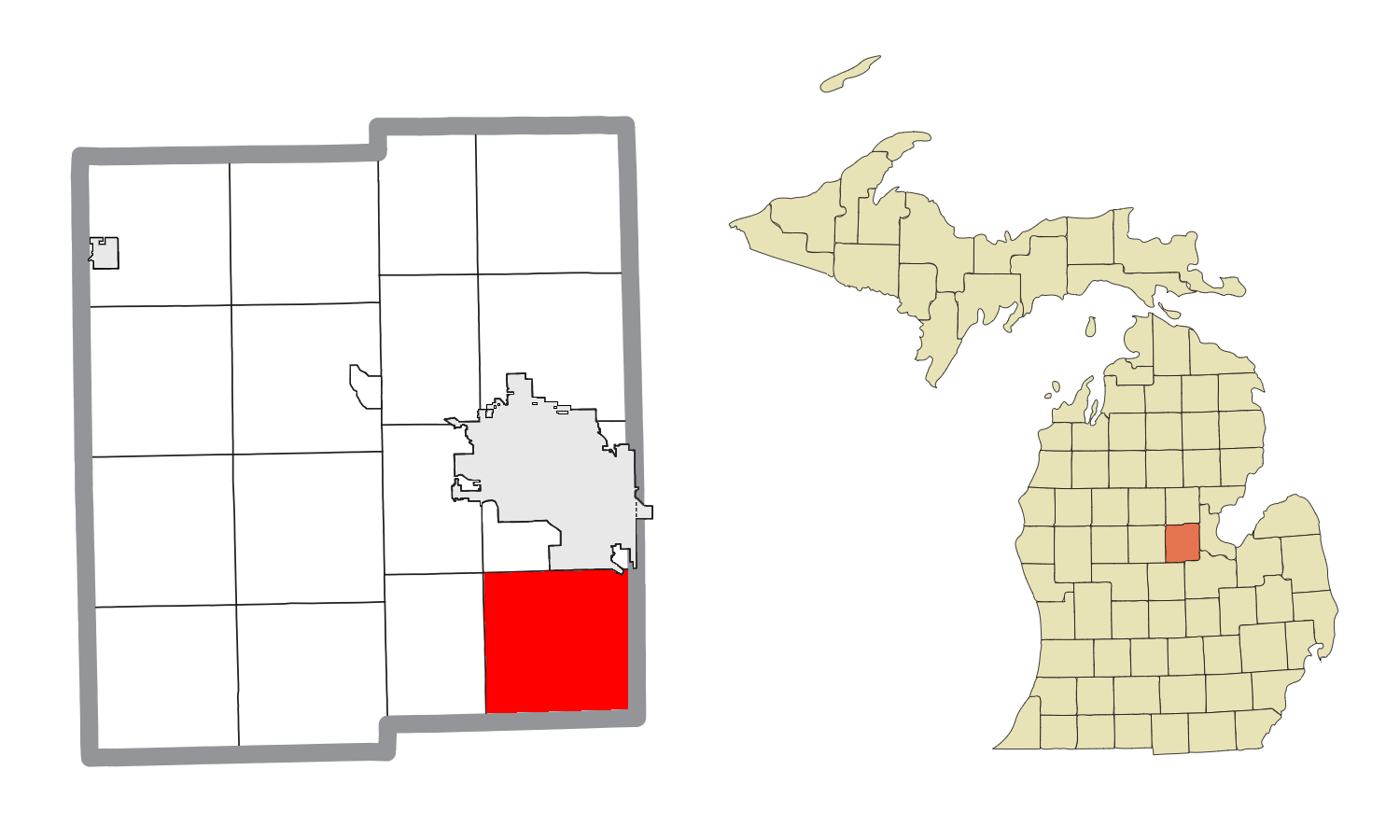
- Location within Midland County and the state of Michigan

- Location within Michigan Location within the United States
- Coordinates: 43°31′29″N 84°13′56″W
- Country: United States
- State: Michigan
- County: Midland
- Established: 1855

Government
  - Supervisor: Charles Tabb
  - Clerk: Mary Ellen Keel

Area
  - Total: 36.59 sq mi (94.8 km^{2})
  - Land: 36.46 sq mi (94.4 km^{2})
  - Water: 0.13 sq mi (0.34 km^{2})
- Elevation: 627 ft (191 m)

Population (2020)
  - Total: 2,775
  - Density: 76.1/sq mi (29.4/km^{2})
- Time zone: UTC-5 (Eastern (EST))
  - Summer (DST): UTC-4 (EDT)
- ZIP Codes: 48623 (Freeland); 48626 (Hemlock); 48640 (Midland)
- Area code: 989
- FIPS code: 26-111-40620
- GNIS feature ID: 1626514
- Website: ingersolltwpmi.gov

Ingersoll Township is a civil township of Midland County in the U.S. state of Michigan. The population was 2,775 at the 2020 census.

== Geography ==
The township is in the southeast corner of Midland County and is bordered to the north by the city of Midland, the county seat. The township is bordered to the east and south by Saginaw County. According to the United States Census Bureau, Ingersoll Township has a total area of 36.6 square miles (95 km^{2}), of which 0.1 square miles (0.3 km^{2}), or 0.34%, are water. The Tittabawassee River crosses the northeast corner of the township.

== Communities ==
- Laporte is an unincorporated community at 43°29′47″N 84°11′20″W, about 8 miles (13 km) south-southeast of downtown Midland. It is at the corners of sections 25, 26, 35, and 36 in the southeast corner of both the township and county. The community first got a post office in January 1874 with the name Lee's Corner, after a local landowner. The post office was renamed Laporte in April 1895 and closed in January 1910.
- The city of Midland, bordering the township to the north, has incorporated a small area of land in the northeast corner of the township.
- Poseyville is a small unincorporated community at 43°32′23″N 84°14′58″W, about 5 miles (8 km) south of downtown Midland. It is at the corners of sections 8, 9, 16, and 17. A post office opened in July 1898 and operated until January 1907.

== Demographics ==
Historical population
Census	Pop.	Note	%±
1860	111		—
1870	402		262.2%
1880	738		83.6%
1890	1,180		59.9%
1900	1,304		10.5%
1910	1,218		−6.6%
1920	1,191		−2.2%
1930	1,161		−2.5%
1940	1,551		33.6%
1950	1,589		2.5%
1960	1,937		21.9%
1970	2,285		18.0%
1980	3,011		31.8%
1990	2,788		−7.4%
2000	3,018		8.2%
2010	2,751		−8.8%
2020	2,775		0.9%
U.S. Decennial Census

As of the census of 2000, there were 3,018 people, 1,067 households, and 837 families residing in the township. The population density was 82.9 inhabitants per square mile (32.0/km^{2}). There were 1,107 housing units at an average density of 30.4 per square mile (11.7/km^{2}). The racial makeup of the township was 97.68% White, 0.33% African American, 0.13% Native American, 0.27% Asian, 0.60% from other races, and 0.99% from two or more races. Hispanic or Latino of any race were 1.79% of the population.

There were 1,067 households, out of which 36.0% had children under the age of 18 living with them, 68.0% were married couples living together, 6.8% had a female householder with no husband present, and 21.5% were non-families. 17.9% of all households were made up of individuals, and 8.7% had someone living alone who was 65 years of age or older. The average household size was 2.70 and the average family size was 3.04.

In the township the population was spread out, with 26.1% under the age of 18, 6.7% from 18 to 24, 29.3% from 25 to 44, 21.9% from 45 to 64, and 15.9% who were 65 years of age or older. The median age was 38 years. For every 100 females, there were 95.1 males. For every 100 females age 18 and over, there were 91.7 males.

The median income for a household in the township was $49,673, and the median income for a family was $55,050. Males had a median income of $41,458 versus $30,385 for females. The per capita income for the township was $22,249. About 3.5% of families and 6.1% of the population were below the poverty line, including 7.3% of those under age 18 and 8.9% of those age 65 or over.
