= Jasper Township, Michigan =

- Civil township
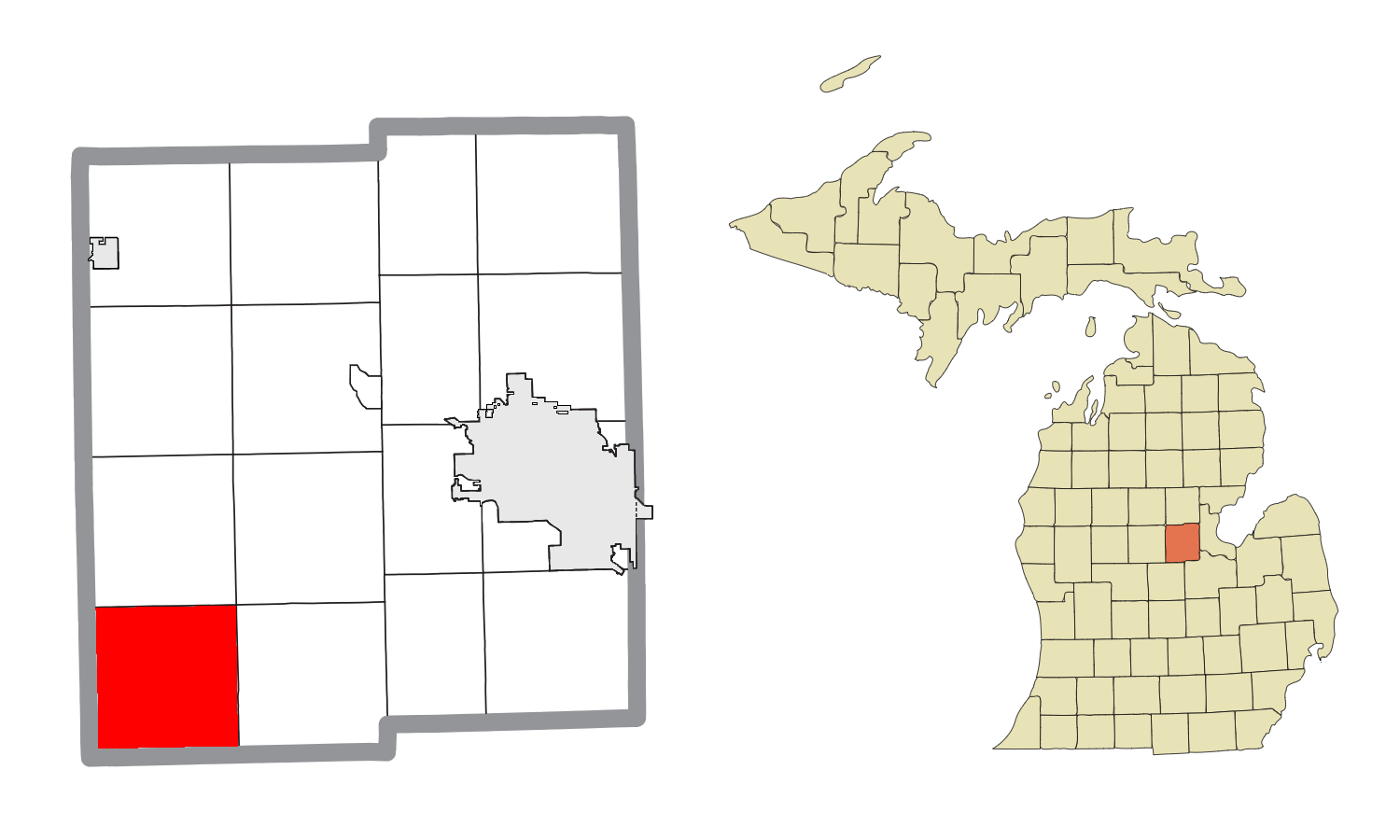
- Location within Midland County

- Location within Michigan Location within the United States
- Coordinates: 43°30′33″N 84°32′54″W
- Country: United States
- State: Michigan
- County: Midland

Government
  - Supervisor: Carmen Bajena
  - Clerk: Jackilynn Colthorp

Area
  - Total: 36.07 sq mi (93.4 km^{2})
  - Land: 35.92 sq mi (93.0 km^{2})
  - Water: 0.15 sq mi (0.39 km^{2})
- Elevation: 690 ft (210 m)

Population (2020)
  - Total: 1,060
  - Density: 29.5/sq mi (11.4/km^{2})
- Time zone: UTC-5 (Eastern (EST))
  - Summer (DST): UTC-4 (EDT)
- ZIP Codes: 48880 (St. Louis); 48883 (Shepherd); 48615 (Breckenridge); 48640 (Midland)
- Area code: 989
- FIPS code: 26-111-41560
- GNIS feature ID: 1626538
- Website: https://jaspertownship.com/

Jasper Township is a civil township of Midland County in the U.S. state of Michigan. The population was 1,060 at the 2020 census.

== Communities ==
- Pleasant Valley is an unincorporated community in the western part of the township at 43°30′35″N 84°35′17″W. A rural post office operated from March 6, 1876, until October 15, 1910.

== Geography ==
Jasper Township occupies the southwest corner of Midland County. It is bordered to the west by Isabella County and to the south by Gratiot County. According to the U.S. Census Bureau, the township has a total area of 36.1 square miles (93 km^{2}), of which 0.1 square miles (0.3 km^{2}), or 0.40%, are water. The township is part of the Saginaw River watershed and is drained by tributaries of the Chippewa River, most notably the Pine River, which crosses the township from south to east.

== Demographics ==
Historical population
Census	Pop.	Note	%±
1870	139		—
1880	602		333.1%
1890	701		16.4%
1900	1,019		45.4%
1910	885		−13.2%
1920	800		−9.6%
1930	704		−12.0%
1940	810		15.1%
1950	735		−9.3%
1960	811		10.3%
1970	826		1.8%
1980	1,129		36.7%
1990	1,096		−2.9%
2000	1,145		4.5%
2010	1,180		3.1%
2020	1,060		−10.2%
U.S. Decennial Census

As of the census of 2000, there were 1,145 people, 418 households, and 311 families residing in the township. The population density was 31.7 inhabitants per square mile (12.2/km^{2}). There were 436 housing units at an average density of 12.1 per square mile (4.7/km^{2}). The racial makeup of the township was 97.82% White, 0.26% Native American, 0.17% Asian, 1.40% from other races, and 0.35% from two or more races. Hispanic or Latino of any race were 1.92% of the population.

There were 418 households, out of which 33.7% had children under the age of 18 living with them, 64.4% were married couples living together, 6.2% had a female householder with no husband present, and 25.4% were non-families. 18.9% of all households were made up of individuals, and 7.7% had someone living alone who was 65 years of age or older. The average household size was 2.74 and the average family size was 3.15.

In the township the population was spread out, with 27.4% under the age of 18, 7.9% from 18 to 24, 31.6% from 25 to 44, 22.8% from 45 to 64, and 10.2% who were 65 years of age or older. The median age was 36 years. For every 100 females, there were 107.8 males. For every 100 females age 18 and over, there were 111.5 males.

The median income for a household in the township was $39,432, and the median income for a family was $47,656. Males had a median income of $36,250 versus $22,434 for females. The per capita income for the township was $16,741. About 4.3% of families and 7.1% of the population were below the poverty line, including 5.6% of those under age 18 and 13.3% of those age 65 or over.
