= Greendale Township, Michigan =

- Civil township
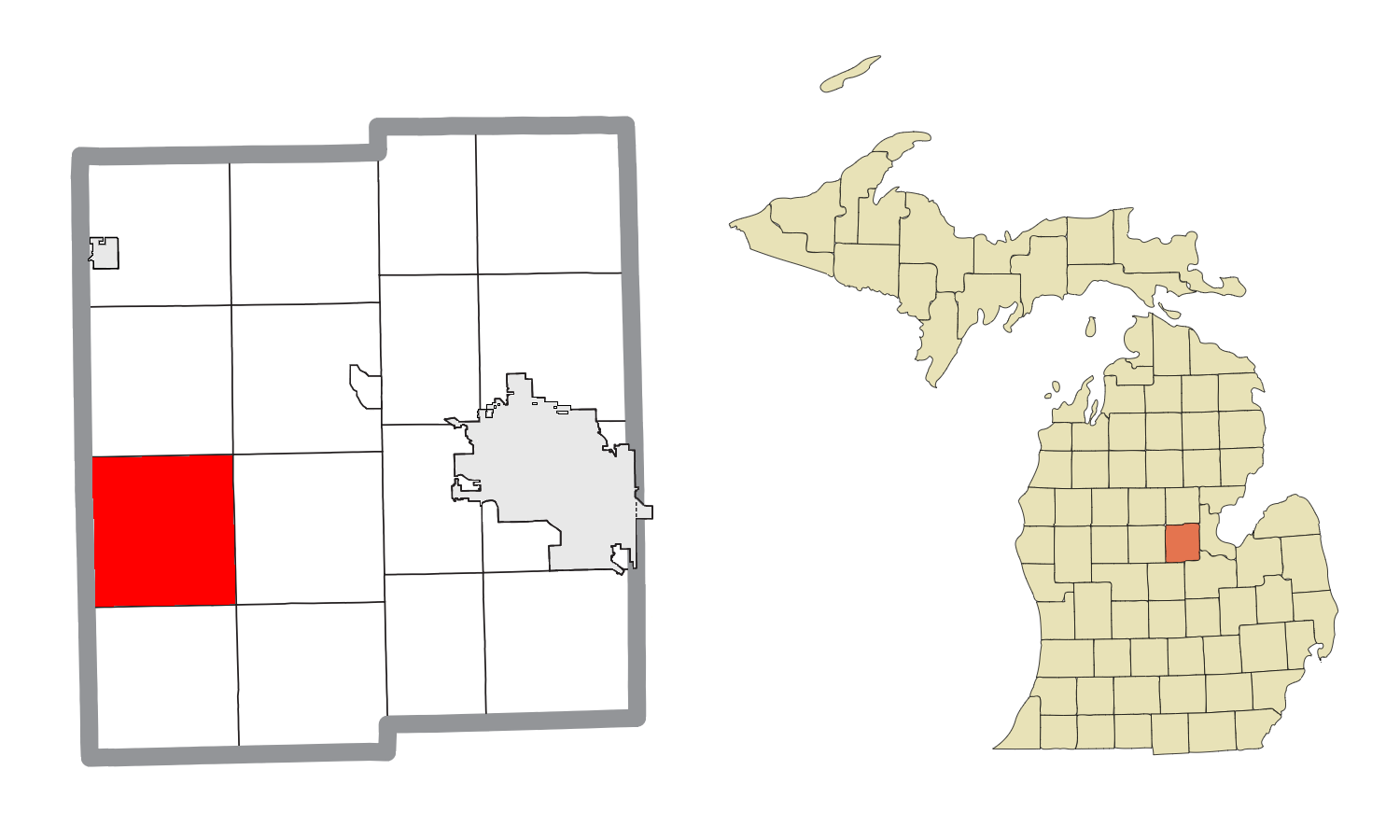
- Location within Midland County and the state of Michigan

- Location within Michigan Location within the United States
- Coordinates: 43°35′56″N 84°32′50″W
- Country: United States
- State: Michigan
- County: Midland
- Established: 1882

Government
  - Supervisor: R. James LeViere
  - Clerk: Ruth Knapp

Area
  - Total: 36.1 sq mi (93 km^{2})
  - Land: 35.4 sq mi (92 km^{2})
  - Water: 0.7 sq mi (1.8 km^{2})
- Elevation: 673 ft (205 m)

Population (2020)
  - Total: 1,731
  - Density: 48.9/sq mi (18.9/km^{2})
- Time zone: UTC-5 (Eastern (EST))
  - Summer (DST): UTC-4 (EDT)
- ZIP Codes: 48883 (Shepherd); 48858 (Mount Pleasant); 48640 (Midland)
- Area code: 989
- FIPS code: 26-111-34860
- GNIS feature ID: 1626396
- Website: greendaletwpmidcomi.org

Greendale Township is a civil township of Midland County in the U.S. state of Michigan. As of the 2020 census, the township population was 1,731.

== History ==
In 1875 Col. William L. Sterns and other men from Berea, Ohio, platted a place in the township called "Central City". The effort to form this city failed and the area is now known as Oil City.

== Communities ==
- Oil City is an unincorporated community in the township centered at the junction of M-20 (Isabella Road) and Coleman Road near the Chippewa River at 43°36′39″N 84°35′18″W. The name comes from the oil refineries around the area, which arose during an oil boom in the 1920s.

== Geography ==
The township is in western Midland County, bordered to the west by Isabella County. According to the U.S. Census Bureau, the township has a total area of 36.1 square miles (93 km^{2}), of which 35.4 square miles (92 km^{2}) are land and 0.7 square miles (1.8 km^{2}), or 1.94%, are water. The Chippewa River, a tributary of the Tittabawassee River and part of the Saginaw River watershed, flows from west to east across the township.

== Demographics ==
Historical population
Census	Pop.	Note	%±
1890	151		—
1900	247		63.6%
1910	337		36.4%
1920	246		−27.0%
1930	536		117.9%
1940	850		58.6%
1950	751		−11.6%
1960	870		15.8%
1970	1,105		27.0%
1980	1,244		12.6%
1990	1,495		20.2%
2000	1,788		19.6%
2010	1,751		−2.1%
2020	1,731		−1.1%
U.S. Decennial Census

As of the census of 2000, there were 1,788 people, 616 households, and 482 families residing in the township. The population density was 49.5 inhabitants per square mile (19.1/km^{2}). There were 646 housing units at an average density of 17.9 per square mile (6.9/km^{2}). The racial makeup of the township was 95.81% White, 0.28% African American, 1.45% Native American, 0.28% Asian, 0.62% from other races, and 1.57% from two or more races. Hispanic or Latino of any race were 1.90% of the population.

There were 616 households, out of which 41.6% had children under the age of 18 living with them, 62.2% were married couples living together, 10.4% had a female householder with no husband present, and 21.6% were non-families. 18.5% of all households were made up of individuals, and 6.3% had someone living alone who was 65 years of age or older. The average household size was 2.90 and the average family size was 3.24.

In the township the population was spread out, with 31.9% under the age of 18, 7.8% from 18 to 24, 33.1% from 25 to 44, 19.8% from 45 to 64, and 7.3% who were 65 years of age or older. The median age was 32 years. For every 100 females, there were 93.9 males. For every 100 females age 18 and over, there were 98.5 males.

The median income for a household in the township was $33,587, and the median income for a family was $36,776. Males had a median income of $32,000 versus $21,250 for females. The per capita income for the township was $14,522. About 10.3% of families and 13.7% of the population were below the poverty line, including 18.7% of those under age 18 and 7.0% of those age 65 or over.
