= Mount Haley Township, Michigan =

- Civil township
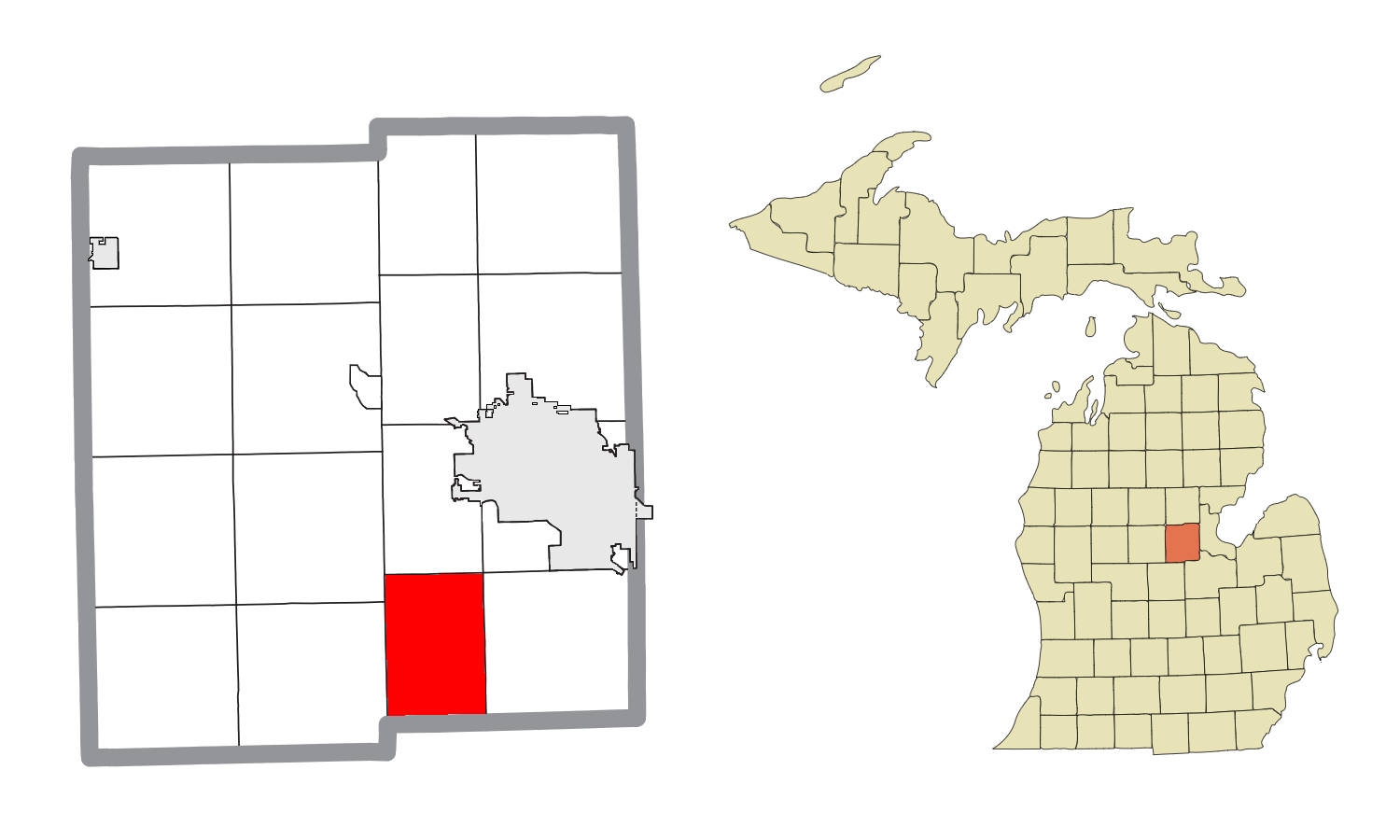
- Location within Midland County and the state of Michigan

- Location within Michigan Location within the United States
- Coordinates: 43°31′02″N 84°19′54″W
- Country: United States
- State: Michigan
- County: Midland

Government
  - Supervisor: Richard Keenan
  - Clerk: Sharon Fleming

Area
  - Total: 23.87 sq mi (61.8 km^{2})
  - Land: 23.82 sq mi (61.7 km^{2})
  - Water: 0.05 sq mi (0.13 km^{2})
- Elevation: 666 ft (203 m)

Population (2020)
  - Total: 1,609
  - Density: 67.6/sq mi (26.1/km^{2})
- Time zone: UTC-5 (Eastern (EST))
  - Summer (DST): UTC-4 (EDT)
- ZIP Codes: 48640 (Midland); 48637 (Merrill); 48623 (Freeland); 48626 (Hemlock)
- Area code: 989
- FIPS code: 26-111-55940
- GNIS feature ID: 1626773
- Website: www.mthaleytwp.com

Mount Haley Township is a civil township of Midland County in the U.S. state of Michigan. The population was 1,609 at the 2020 census.

== Geography ==
The township is in southern Midland County, bordered to the south by Saginaw County. According to the United States Census Bureau, the township has a total area of 23.9 square miles (62 km^{2}), of which 0.05 square miles (0.13 km^{2}), or 0.20%, are water.

== Communities ==
- Gordonville was a settlement centered initially on a shingle mill. It had a post office starting in 1875 originally under the name Headache. Later that year it was renamed to Bradford. The post office was renamed Gordonville in 1906. The post office closed in 1910.

== Demographics ==
Historical population
Census	Pop.	Note	%±
1880	223		—
1890	444		99.1%
1900	683		53.8%
1910	685		0.3%
1920	665		−2.9%
1930	613		−7.8%
1940	732		19.4%
1950	883		20.6%
1960	1,085		22.9%
1970	1,262		16.3%
1980	1,586		25.7%
1990	1,656		4.4%
2000	1,654		−0.1%
2010	1,678		1.5%
2020	1,609		−4.1%
U.S. Decennial Census

As of the census of 2010, there were 1,678 people, 616 households, and 468 families residing in the township. The population density was 69.5 inhabitants per square mile (26.8/km^{2}). There were 641 housing units at an average density of 27.0 per square mile (10.4/km^{2}). The racial makeup of the township was 97.88% White, 0.85% Native American, 0.42% Asian, 0.30% from other races, and 0.54% from two or more races. Hispanic or Latino of any race were 0.91% of the population.

There were 616 households, out of which 34.9% had children under the age of 18 living with them, 66.7% were married couples living together, 5.5% had a female householder with no husband present, and 24.0% were non-families in 2000. 19.2% of all households were made up of individuals, and 5.4% had someone living alone who was 65 years of age or older. The average household size was 2.69 and the average family size was 3.09 in 2000.

In 2000, the township the population was spread out, with 25.8% under the age of 18, 8.3% from 18 to 24, 31.8% from 25 to 44, 25.2% from 45 to 64, and 8.9% who were 65 years of age or older. The median age was 36 years. For every 100 females, there were 106.5 males. For every 100 females age 18 and over, there were 102.0 males.

The median income for a household in the township was $42,321, and the median income for a family was $47,153. Males had a median income of $38,875 versus $21,800 for females. The per capita income for the township was $18,553. About 5.8% of families and 8.3% of the population were below the poverty line, including 10.0% of those under age 18 and 7.3% of those age 65 or over.
