= Midland County, Michigan =

County in Michigan, United States

- County
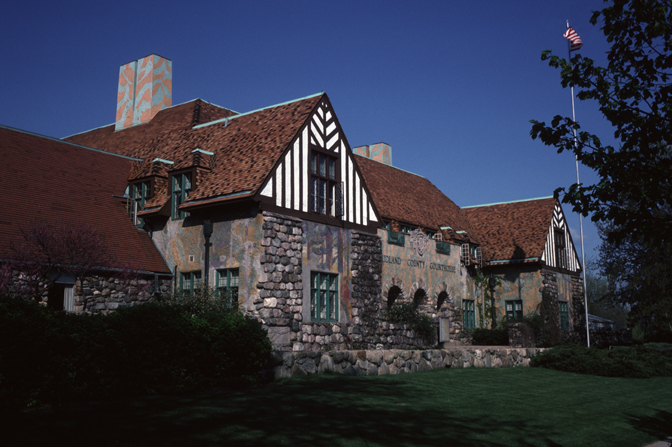
- Midland County Courthouse

- Seal Logo

- Location within the U.S. state of Michigan
- Coordinates: 43°38′N 84°23′W
- Country: United States
- State: Michigan
- Founded: 1831
- Reorganized: 1855
- Seat: Midland
- Largest city: Midland

Area
  - Total: 528 sq mi (1,370 km^{2})
  - Land: 516 sq mi (1,340 km^{2})
  - Water: 12 sq mi (31 km^{2}) 2.2%

Population (2020)
  - Total: 83,494
  - Estimate (2025): 83,754 ▲
  - Density: 162/sq mi (63/km^{2})
- Time zone: UTC−5 (Eastern)
  - Summer (DST): UTC−4 (EDT)
- Congressional districts: 2nd, 8th
- Website: midlandcountymi.gov

Midland County is one of 83 counties located in the U.S. state of Michigan. As of the 2020 census, the population was 83,494 making it the 24th largest by population in the state. It is the sixth smallest county by area. The county seat is Midland. The name of the county is due to its proximity to the geographical center of the Lower Peninsula. It was founded in 1831; however, it was not until 1855 that the county was effectively organized.

Midland County comprises the Midland, Michigan, metropolitan statistical area and is included in the Saginaw–Midland–Bay City combined statistical area in the Mid/Central Michigan region.

== History ==
=== Early history ===
For centuries, the county was home to Native Americans, and Chippewa Indians inhabited the area when the first Europeans made contact.

=== 19th century ===
In the year of 1831, Midland County's borders had been set. In 1850, Midland County was officially organized. In 1874, the Flint and Pere Marquette Railroad linked Midland to the nationwide railroad network. The City of Midland, the county seat, is officially incorporated in 1887, and 3 years later in 1890, Herbert Henry Dow arrives and founds the Dow Chemical Corporation, today one of the world's largest chemical companies.

==== Civil War ====
When the American Civil War broke out in 1861, many men from the county enlisted in the Union Army, many in Company B of the 10th Michigan Volunteer Infantry Regiment, and Company H of the 27th Michigan Volunteer Infantry Regiment, but some ended up in different regiments. Not all of them came back alive and several were wounded. Many veterans of the war are also buried in the county. There were a total of 5 different Posts, or veteran groups, of the Grand Army of the Republic, a Union veterans organization, in Midland County.

Some of the regiments which included men from Midland County are: 10th Michigan Volunteer Infantry Regiment, 27th Michigan Volunteer Infantry Regiment, 29th Michigan Volunteer Infantry Regiment, 16th Michigan Volunteer Infantry Regiment, 3rd Michigan Volunteer Cavalry Regiment, 7th Michigan Volunteer Cavalry Regiment, 2nd Michigan Volunteer Cavalry Regiment, 1st Michigan Volunteer Cavalry Regiment, and 23rd Michigan Volunteer Infantry Regiment.

=== 20th century ===
In the 20th century the county saw significant growth with the entrenchment of the Dow Chemical Corporation and the establishment of major roads, highways, and a few minor airports. However, in the late 20th century the Pere Marquette Railroad was closed, which cut off passenger train travel from the region.

==== World War 1 ====
In World War 1, once the US had entered the war in 1917, the Dow Chemical Corporation, based mainly in the city of Midland, was involved with the production of poisonous gases for use during the war, and with the production of ammunition. Additionally, 675 men from Midland joined the US military during the war, and 8 of them died in the line of duty.

==== World War 2 ====
In World War 2, many men from the county enlisted in the US Military, and several would die. Additionally Dow turned its factories towards supplying the war effort and they would assist in manufacturing explosives, flares, and medicine. There is also a large memorial to veterans from Midland County from this war.

==== Cold War ====
During the Cold War, an Army National Guard depot was set up in the city of Midland. In the Vietnam War, Dow and the rest of Midland County were the main suppliers of Napalm used during the conflict. Several men would also die in the Korean War and Vietnam War.

=== 21st century ===
In the 21st century, the Sons of Union Veterans, the successor to the Grand Army of the Republic, founded the U.S. Grant Camp No. 67, which serves the Midland, Saginaw, and Bay City area. During the War on Terror, many men from the county enlisted and few died. The Midland County Veterans Memorial was refurbished. The city of Coleman also built a new war memorial. Curiously, none of these memorials reference the service of Midland men in the Civil War.

In May 2020, Midland County residents in parts of the city of Midland, the village of Sanford, Edenville Township, Midland Township, Tittabawassee, Thomas Township, Saginaw Township, Lincoln Township, Homer Township and Dow Chemical were forced to evacuate due to high flooding which was caused by the breach of the Edenville and Sanford dams.The Township of Jerome also suffered severe damage outside of the Village of Sanford

== Geography ==
Counties adjacent to Midland County

According to the U.S. Census Bureau, the county has a total area of 528 square miles (1,370 km^{2}), of which 516 square miles (1,340 km^{2}) is land and 12 square miles (31 km^{2}) (2.2%) is water. The distance to Saginaw Bay on Lake Huron is less than 40 miles (64 km).

=== Adjacent counties ===
- Gladwin County (north)
- Bay County (east)
- Saginaw County (southeast)
- Gratiot County (south)
- Isabella County (west)
- Clare County (northwest)

Major waterways in Midland County

=== Primary waterways ===
- Tittabawassee River
  - Edenville Dam
    - Wixom Lake
  - Sanford Dam
    - Sanford Lake
  - Sturgeon Creek
  - Salt River
  - Tobacco River
  - Chippewa River
    - Pine River
- Kawkawlin River

=== Neighborhoods ===
The city of Midland, Michigan occupies Midland Charter township. The city's incorporated area extends well into Larkin Township, Homer Township and a small portion of Lincoln Township.

Midland neighborhoods

There are more than 35 neighborhoods within city of Midland according to the neighborhood map on the city's website. There are eight main areas:

- Downtown encompasses the central business district and is a hub for commerce, dining, and cultural activities. The Center City includes the historic "Circle", dating from 1938, which was the city's second business district.
- North Side neighborhoods north of downtown, often with a mix of residential areas, parks and schools.
- Country Club features upscale houses, large lots with trees, highest walkability and bike scores.
- Midland West neighborhoods are known as friendly and peaceful with well-maintained properties. It includes the Chippewa and Tittabawassee Rivers, parks and open spaces for recreation, often with a mix of housing styles and mature trees. Upscale Greystone Woods is located there.
- East End refers to the area east of downtown, often characterized by a mix of older residential and commercial spaces. A revitalization of Midtown started in 2018, along with Grove Park and surrounding neighborhoods and formation of the Midtown Midland Neighborhood Association.
- Industrial Park was the former location of Dow Chemical's plants along the Bay City Road corridor. In 2018, Dow Michigan Operations Industrial Park (I-Park), was created on the 2,600 acres (1,100 ha; 4.1 mi^{2}; 11 km^{2}) site that serves multiple companies as a logistics, manufacturing and R&D center for approximately 6,000 employees/contractors. While owned by Dow, it is supported by the Michigan Strategic Fund for modernization that will attract businesses with their utilities, logistics and environmental services.
- West Main Street Historic district was established in 1979 to preserve and document Midland's historical structures; specifically blocks and lots within the original Midland plat, offering a glimpse into the city's history. A commission reviews and must approve applications for construction, additions, alterations, repairs, moves, excavations, or demolitions of all properties within the district.
- the South is the relatively small area south of the Industrial Park, site of a defunct lumber town (Mapleton) and train depot.
- Discovery Square is an area in the city of Midland containing five prominent buildings designed by Alden B. Dow on land originally owned by his father, Herbert Henry Dow. They are: Grace A. Dow Memorial Library, Midland Center for the Arts, Michigan Molecular Institute, Dow Gardens and Alden Dow House and Studio. Alden Dow coined the name at the dedication of MCFTA in 1971.
- Heritage Park is at the Northwood University campus and an attraction featuring the 1874 Victorian Gothic Bradley Home; a brine well and the Herbert Dow Museum which is a replication of the Evens Flour Gristmill; and the Carriage House, which contains an operating blacksmith shop and a display of carriages and sleighs, all horse-drawn.

The only other incorporated city in the county is Coleman, Michigan in Warren Township, Michigan. Due to the town's small size (population 1,100) there are no formally defined neighborhoods; commonly recognized areas include the business district, "Stoner's-ville", Little Town, Pere Marquette Senior Estates and an industrial park.

According to the Midland County website, Pinecrest Farms is a notable development of 160 acres west of the Currie Golf Course. It is a long-term-care facility for the elderly and individuals with mental and/or physical disabilities.

The village of Sanford was founded in 1864 as the first salt well in Michigan. It has a population 813, according to the 2020 census and in the 21st century, life was centered around Sanford Lake, reservoir of the Sanford Dam on the Tittabawassee River.

Edenville Township includes the Tittabawassee River and Wixom Lake which provided recreational opportunities for residents and tourists. The Au Sable State Forest covers 40% of the township.

=== Climate ===
Midland County has a humid continental climate (Dfb) with hot, rainy summers with cool nights and cold, snowy winters with average highs around freezing.

Climate data for Midland, Michigan (1991–2020 normals, extremes 1970–present)
Month	Jan	Feb	Mar	Apr	May	Jun	Jul	Aug	Sep	Oct	Nov	Dec	Year
Record high °F (°C)	60 (16)	67 (19)	86 (30)	88 (31)	96 (36)	103 (39)	100 (38)	100 (38)	95 (35)	89 (32)	75 (24)	67 (19)	103 (39)
Mean maximum °F (°C)	48.8 (9.3)	49.8 (9.9)	65.6 (18.7)	77.8 (25.4)	86.0 (30.0)	91.7 (33.2)	92.4 (33.6)	91.2 (32.9)	87.6 (30.9)	78.6 (25.9)	64.1 (17.8)	52.7 (11.5)	94.6 (34.8)
Mean daily maximum °F (°C)	29.3 (−1.5)	31.9 (−0.1)	42.7 (5.9)	55.8 (13.2)	68.3 (20.2)	77.9 (25.5)	82.1 (27.8)	79.7 (26.5)	72.9 (22.7)	59.9 (15.5)	45.7 (7.6)	34.4 (1.3)	56.7 (13.7)
Daily mean °F (°C)	22.9 (−5.1)	24.7 (−4.1)	34.0 (1.1)	45.9 (7.7)	58.0 (14.4)	67.6 (19.8)	71.8 (22.1)	69.9 (21.1)	62.5 (16.9)	50.9 (10.5)	38.7 (3.7)	28.8 (−1.8)	48.0 (8.9)
Mean daily minimum °F (°C)	16.6 (−8.6)	17.5 (−8.1)	25.3 (−3.7)	35.9 (2.2)	47.6 (8.7)	57.3 (14.1)	61.5 (16.4)	60.1 (15.6)	52.2 (11.2)	41.8 (5.4)	31.8 (−0.1)	23.2 (−4.9)	39.2 (4.0)
Mean minimum °F (°C)	−1.7 (−18.7)	−0.3 (−17.9)	6.9 (−13.9)	22.4 (−5.3)	33.6 (0.9)	42.9 (6.1)	49.9 (9.9)	48.9 (9.4)	38.1 (3.4)	28.9 (−1.7)	17.5 (−8.1)	7.1 (−13.8)	−5.2 (−20.7)
Record low °F (°C)	−19 (−28)	−15 (−26)	−10 (−23)	10 (−12)	23 (−5)	32 (0)	39 (4)	35 (2)	28 (−2)	18 (−8)	3 (−16)	−11 (−24)	−19 (−28)
Average precipitation inches (mm)	2.01 (51)	1.92 (49)	2.00 (51)	3.48 (88)	3.74 (95)	3.71 (94)	2.82 (72)	3.17 (81)	2.82 (72)	3.14 (80)	2.65 (67)	1.95 (50)	33.41 (849)
Average snowfall inches (cm)	9.1 (23)	8.1 (21)	3.1 (7.9)	0.6 (1.5)	0.0 (0.0)	0.0 (0.0)	0.0 (0.0)	0.0 (0.0)	0.0 (0.0)	0.0 (0.0)	1.0 (2.5)	9.5 (24)	31.4 (79.9)
Average precipitation days (≥ 0.01 in)	12.0	8.9	9.7	12.3	12.7	10.7	10.3	10.7	9.6	13.2	12.2	11.6	133.9
Average snowy days (≥ 0.1 in)	6.1	4.7	2.1	0.4	0.0	0.0	0.0	0.0	0.0	0.0	0.9	5.6	19.8
Source: NOAA

=== Parks and gardens ===
There are no National or State Parks in Midland County, but Midland City parks number 80+ with over 3,000 acres (1,200 ha) of park land. Seven are classified as Regional Parks, typically larger than 200 acres (81 ha); seven are considered Community Parks, normally over 15 acres (6.1 ha); Neighborhood Parks number 19, usually between 5 and 10 acres (2.0 and 4.0 ha) located within residential areas; and the 36 Mini-Parks are mostly less than an acre (0.40 ha). Other city-owned land includes pathways, undeveloped areas intended for "passive recreation", waterfront areas and protected natural areas.

- Walkers, joggers, bikers, and skaters can use the Pere Marquette Rail-Trail, a ribbon of asphalt stretching 30 miles (50 km) to the neighboring city of Clare. Midland County's system of natural pathways continues to expand with the recent addition of the Chippewa Trail, which intersects with the Pere Marquette trail. The Chippewa Trail ends at the Chippewa Nature Center.
- The Chippewa Nature Center is a protected wildlife area with miles of trails within a territory of more than 1,000 acres (400 ha) of deciduous and coniferous woods, rivers, ponds, wetlands (marsh, fen, bog, and swamp) and upland fields.
- Midland's Dow Gardens feature 56-acre (23 ha) of flower and vegetable gardens, plus an arboretum. These were the original gardens of the Dow homestead and are open for tours.
- The 54-acre (22 ha) Whiting Forest, home to the longest Canopy walkway in the nation, is connected to Dow Gardens with a series of pedestrian bridges and walks. The canopy walk is suspended up to 40 feet above the ground and is 1,400 feet (430 m). Visitors can walk the trails, observe nature and enjoy drinks and snacks in the cafe.
- Dahlia Hill is a terraced garden and organization near the Dow Gardens that annually grows over 3,000 Dahlia plants that flower in late summer.
- The Tridge is a three-way bridge over the Chippewa and Tittabawassee Rivers at Chippewassee Park. Other parks include Midland City Forest, Plymouth Park Pool & Fun Zone, Emerson Park, Barstow Woods and Central Park.
- County Parks outside the city include Sanford Lake Park, Veterans Memorial Park, Pine Haven Recreational Area, Manitou Park, Laur Big Salt River Park and River Trails Heritage Park.

== Demographics ==
Historical population
Census	Pop.	Note	%±
1850	65		—
1860	787		1,110.8%
1870	3,285		317.4%
1880	6,893		109.8%
1890	10,657		54.6%
1900	14,439		35.5%
1910	14,005		−3.0%
1920	17,237		23.1%
1930	19,150		11.1%
1940	27,094		41.5%
1950	35,662		31.6%
1960	51,450		44.3%
1970	63,769		23.9%
1980	73,578		15.4%
1990	75,651		2.8%
2000	82,874		9.5%
2010	83,629		0.9%
2020	83,494		−0.2%
2025 (est.)	83,754	▲	0.3%
U.S. Decennial Census; 1790-1960 1900-1990; 1990-2000 2010-2018

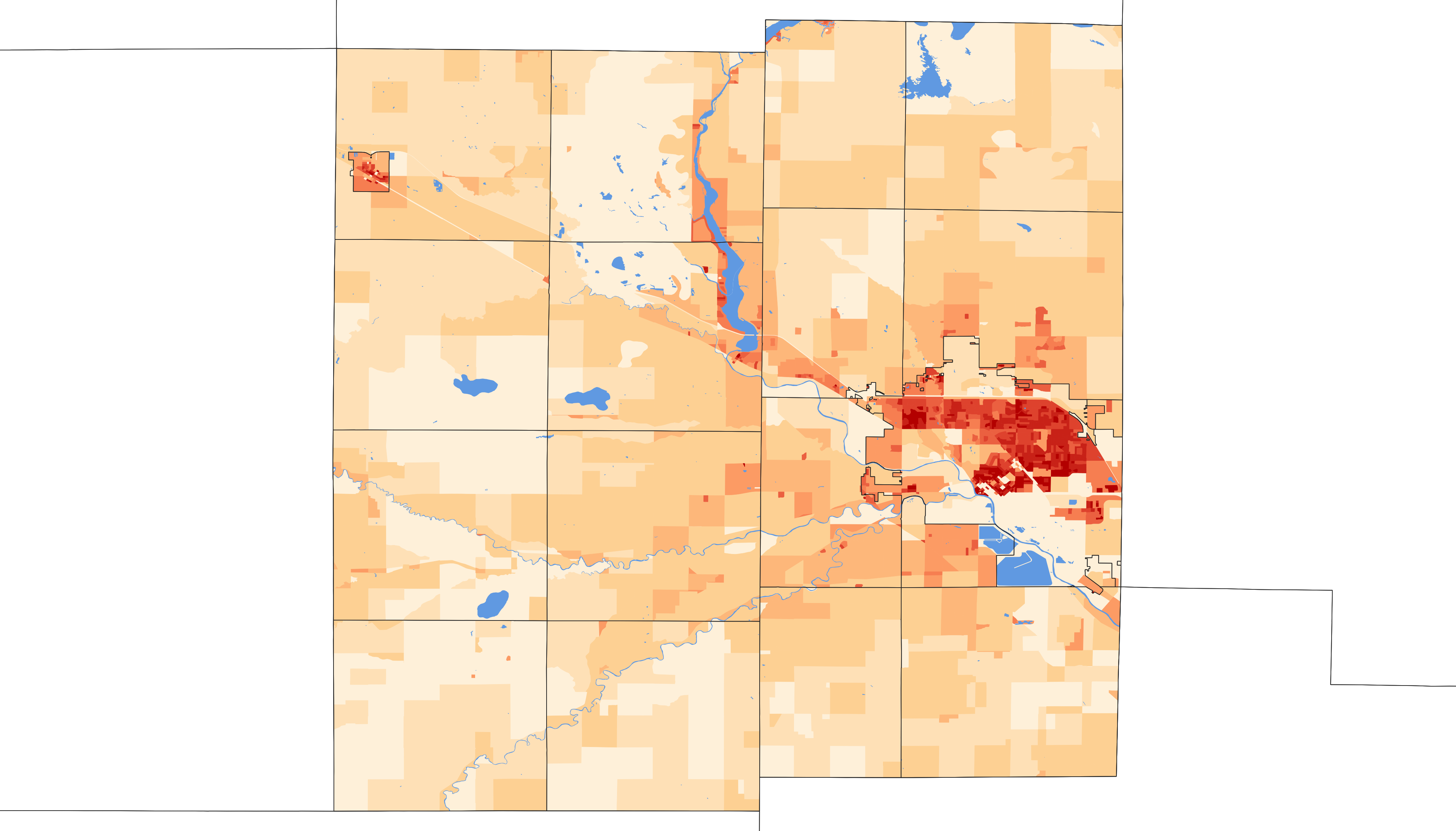
2020 population density of Midland County MI by census block

=== Racial and ethnic composition ===
Midland County, Michigan – Racial and ethnic composition Note: the US Census treats Hispanic/Latino as an ethnic category. This table excludes Latinos from the racial categories and assigns them to a separate category. Hispanics/Latinos may be of any race.
Race / Ethnicity (NH = Non-Hispanic)	Pop 1980	Pop 1990	Pop 2000	Pop 2010	Pop 2020	% 1980	% 1990	% 2000	% 2010	% 2020
White alone (NH)	71,300	72,788	78,333	77,846	73,825	96.90%	96.22%	94.52%	93.08%	88.42%
Black or African American alone (NH)	553	706	857	983	942	0.75%	0.93%	1.03%	1.18%	1.13%
Native American or Alaska Native alone (NH)	190	311	312	336	293	0.26%	0.41%	0.38%	0.40%	0.35%
Asian alone (NH)	587	785	1,225	1,555	1,710	0.80%	1.04%	1.48%	1.86%	2.05%
Native Hawaiian or Pacific Islander alone (NH)	x	x	26	46	83	x	x	0.03%	0.06%	0.10%
Other race alone (NH)	138	26	63	57	320	0.19%	0.03%	0.08%	0.07%	0.38%
Mixed race or Multiracial (NH)	x	x	771	1,102	3,662	x	x	0.93%	1.32%	4.39%
Hispanic or Latino (any race)	810	1,035	1,287	1,704	2,659	1.10%	1.37%	1.55%	2.04%	3.18%
Total	73,578	75,651	82,874	83,629	83,494	100.00%	100.00%	100.00%	100.00%	100.00%

=== 2020 census ===
As of the 2020 census, the county had a population of 83,494. The median age was 42.0 years. 21.7% of residents were under the age of 18 and 19.6% of residents were 65 years of age or older. For every 100 females there were 97.8 males, and for every 100 females age 18 and over there were 95.0 males age 18 and over.

The racial makeup of the county was 89.6% White, 1.2% Black or African American, 0.4% American Indian and Alaska Native, 2.1% Asian, 0.1% Native Hawaiian and Pacific Islander, 0.9% from some other race, and 5.8% from two or more races. Hispanic or Latino residents of any race comprised 3.2% of the population.

56.8% of residents lived in urban areas, while 43.2% lived in rural areas.

There were 34,288 households in the county, of which 28.0% had children under the age of 18 living in them. Of all households, 52.4% were married-couple households, 16.7% were households with a male householder and no spouse or partner present, and 23.8% were households with a female householder and no spouse or partner present. About 27.7% of all households were made up of individuals and 12.3% had someone living alone who was 65 years of age or older.

There were 36,867 housing units, of which 7.0% were vacant. Among occupied housing units, 76.6% were owner-occupied and 23.4% were renter-occupied. The homeowner vacancy rate was 1.1% and the rental vacancy rate was 6.7%.

=== 2000 census ===
As of the 2000 census, there were 82,874 people, 31,769 households, and 22,683 families residing in the county. The population density was 159 people per square mile (61 people/km^{2}). There were 33,796 housing units at an average density of 65 per square mile (25/km^{2}). The racial makeup of the county was 95.50% White, 1.05% Black or African American, 0.40% Native American, 1.49% Asian, 0.03% Pacific Islander, 0.44% from other races, and 1.09% from two or more races. 1.55% of the population were Hispanic or Latino of any race. 28.6% were of German, 11.5% English, 10.2% United States or American, 8.9% Irish and 6.1% Polish ancestry, 96.7% spoke only English, while 1.6% spoke Spanish at home.

There were 31,769 households, out of which 34.90% had children under the age of 18 living with them, 60.10% were married couples living together, 8.10% had a female householder with no husband present, and 28.60% were non-families. 23.50% of all households were made up of individuals, and 9.00% had someone living alone who was 65 years of age or older. The average household size was 2.56 and the average family size was 3.04.

In the county, the population was spread out, with 26.90% under the age of 18, 8.70% from 18 to 24, 29.20% from 25 to 44, 23.20% from 45 to 64, and 12.00% who were 65 years of age or older. The median age was 36 years. For every 100 females there were 96.30 males. For every 100 females age 18 and over, there were 93.30 males.

The median county income for a household was $45,674; family, $55,483. Males had a median income of $45,656 versus $27,470 for females. The per capita income for the county was $23,383. About 5.70% of families and 8.40% of the population were below the poverty line, including 9.50% of those under age 18 and 7.50% of those age 65 or over.

=== Religion ===
More than 100 places of worship county-wide represent a variety of denominations and architectural styles, once earning Midland the nickname, City of Beautiful Churches. In the 2020 survey of Midland County, Michigan by Association of Religion Data Archives, there were 87 congregations and 36,998 "adherents" to organized religion.

Congregations	Adherents	Tradition
4	14,067	Catholic
54	13,257	Evangelical Protestant
17	7,468	Mainline Protestant
1	190	Islam
3	616	Jehovah's Witnesses
2	948	Latter-day Saints
1	300	Black Protestant
2	7,602	Other Christian

- The Roman Catholic Diocese of Saginaw is the controlling regional body for the Catholic Church.
- The Episcopal Diocese of Eastern Michigan in Saginaw, Michigan is the controlling body for the Episcopal Church.

Midland's Volunteer Center recruits upwards of 2,000 volunteers each year, and the United Way of Midland County supports 25 community organizations.

== Economy ==
=== Top employers ===
According to the Midland Daily News, the top employers as of 2021 in Midland County were:

#	Employer	Full-time employees	Product
1	MidMichigan Health	4,878	Healthcare
2	Dow Chemical	4,003	Chemicals
3	Midland Public Schools	1,039	Education
4	DuPont	697	Chemicals
5	Corteva Agriscience	664	Chemicals
6	Greater Midland Community Centers	564	Recreation
7	Huntington Bank	535	Banking
8	Northwood University	501	Education
9	City of Midland Government	467	Government
10	Three Rivers Corporation	396	Construction
11	Walmart	327	Retail sales
12	Midland County Government	324	Government
13	Meijer	303	Retail sales
14	Huhtamaki Plastics	257	Manufacturing
15	International Flavors & Fragrances	250	Manufacturing
16	Bierlein Companies	236	Demolition
17	Trinseo	230	Manufacturing
18	Fisher Companies	200	Construction
19	Bullock Creek Public Schools	195	Education
20	Robinson Industries	150	Manufacturing

== Media ==
=== Television stations ===
Midland Community Television Network (MCTN) is the City of Midland's public, government, and education access cable television channel group. Midland has no local commercial television station but is part of Nielsen's Flint-Saginaw-Bay City-Midland Designated Market Area which is the 66th largest market in the United States for Television Viewers. Saginaw is the home of CBS affiliate WNEM which maintains its studios and offices inside the city though its license is for Bay City, MI. ABC affiliate WJRT maintains its offices and newsrooms in Saginaw while its studios are in its community of license, Flint. Only NBC affiliate WEYI and Christian station WAQP have the City of Saginaw as their city of record but both maintain their facilities outside of the city. Charter Communications operates a cable television network servicing the City of Midland under a franchise agreement.

Television stations in the Midland, Michigan area (Ascending order)
Channel	Call letters	Description	Comments
5	WNEM-TV	CBS affiliate	Licensed to Bay City; studios in Saginaw
12	WJRT-TV	ABC affiliate	Based and licensed in Flint
19	WDCQ-TV	PBS member station	Licensed to Bad Axe; studios at Delta College in University Center
24	W24DL-D	3ABN affiliate	Based and licensed in Saginaw; programmed via satellite
25	WEYI-TV	NBC affiliate	Licensed to Saginaw; studios in Clio
46	WBSF	CW affiliate	Licensed to Bay City; studios in Clio
49	WAQP	TCT O&O affiliate	Based and licensed in Saginaw
66	WSMH	Fox affiliate	Based and licensed in Flint

=== Radio stations ===
Radio stations
Frequency	Call sign	Name	Format	Owner	City
790 AM	WSGW	Newsradio 790	News/Talk	Alpha Media	Saginaw
1400 AM	WSAM	The Bay 1400 AM and 104FM	Adult Contemporary	MacDonald Broadcasting	Saginaw
1490 AM	WMPX	Sunny 97.7 107.7	Adult Standards	Steel Broadcasting	Midland; Beaverton
88.3 FM	WEJC	Smile FM	Contemporary Christian	Smile FM Michigan Radio Network	White Star
90.9 FM	WTRK	Air 1	Contemporary Christian	Educational Media Foundation	Freeland
93.3 FM	WKQZ	The Rock Station, Z93	Modern rock	Cumulus Media	Midland; studios in Saginaw
94.5 FM	WCEN	94.5 The Moose	Country music	Alpha Media	Hemlock; studios in Saginaw
96.1 FM	WHNN	My 96.1	Adult Contemporary	Cumulus Media	Bay City; studios in Saginaw
98.1 FM	WKCQ	98.1 KCQ	Country music	MacDonald Broadcasting	Saginaw
99.7 FM	WUGN	Non-commercial	Adult Contemporary	Family Life Communications	Midland
100.5 FM	WSGW	FM Talk 100.5	News/Talk	Alpha Media	Carrollton; studios in Saginaw
101.7 FM	WPRJ	RadioU	Christian CHR	Cumulus Media	Coleman
102.5 FM	WIOG	The Hit Music Channel	Contemporary hits	Cumulus Media	Bay City; studios in Saginaw
103.1 FM	WGDN	103 Country	Country music	Apple Broadcasting Company	Gladwin
104.5 FM	WILZ	Wheelz 104.5	Classic rock	Cumulus Media	Saginaw
106.3 FM	WGER	106.3 The Core	Modern rock	Fritz Broadcasting	Saginaw
107.1 FM	WTLZ	KISS 107.1	Urban adult contemporary	Alpha Media	Saginaw

=== Newspapers ===
The Midland Sentinel was founded in 1858, then renamed the Midland Republican in 1881. That weekly newspaper became the Midland Daily News in 1937. Hearst Corporation purchased it in 1979 and as of 2025 it has a circulation of over 5,000 publishing Monday through Friday plus a weekend edition.

The Chemical City Paper began publication as an electronic newspaper in 2022 with goal of "Covering local government, education, business and the arts in Midland". It is founded as a 501(c)3 nonprofit with a nonpartisan viewpoint.

== Military ==
The only military entity in Midland County is the 1460th Transportation Company, Michigan National Guard. The Armory is located at 2847 Airport Road, designed by Alden B. Dow and constructed in the 70s. Few women were in the military at that time, but in 2025 women can serve in every military job. In fall of 2023 work commenced on demolition and construction of a 9,860-square-foot (900 m^{2}) addition of office, storage, learning and support spaces. Remodeling the existing facility created separate male/female shower, changing and toilet areas, classrooms, workout and break room at a cost of $5.1 million.

== Arts and culture ==
=== Historical markers ===
There are four recognized Michigan historical markers in the county.

- John and Almira Kelly House
- Midland County Courthouse
- Origins of Salt Industry / State Salt Well No. 1
- The Upper Bridge

=== Sites of interest ===
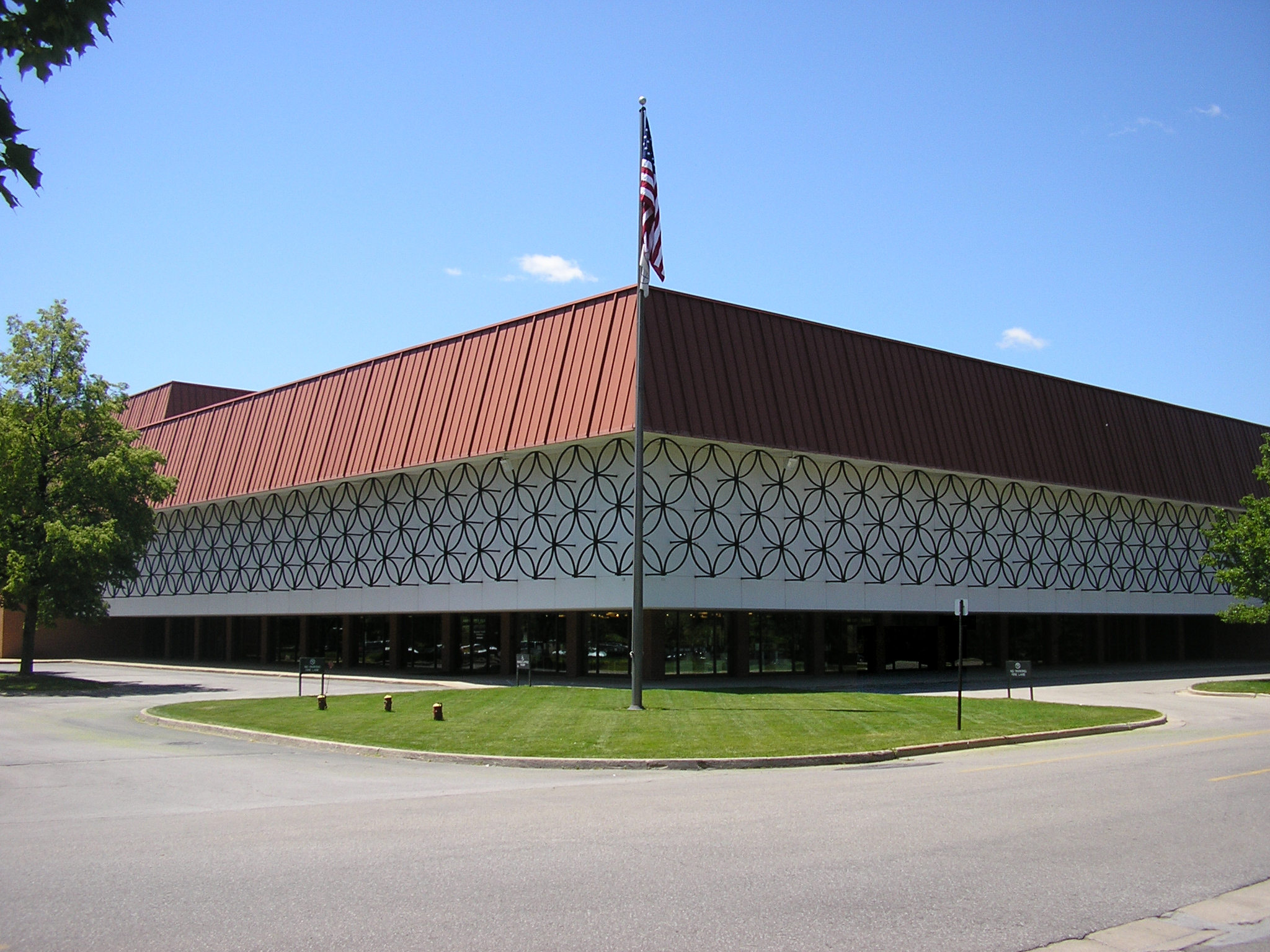
Midland Center for the Arts

Midland has many cultural opportunities in fields ranging from music and theater to science and the arts. The Midland Center for the Arts delivers hands-on exhibits in science, art and technology, at the Alden B. Dow Museum of Science and Art. The center also provides two state-of-the-art auditoriums for audiences of 400 to 1500 to enjoy everything from the Midland Symphony Orchestra and Center Stage Theatre, to professional programming through MATRIX: Midland.

Midland County Historical Society's Heritage Park provides an opportunity to explore Midland County's history through a variety of avenues. The Herbert D. Doan Midland County History Center houses a research library, gift shop and the interactive Dorothy Dow Arbury Midland County History Gallery, which provides hands on exhibits for exploring Midland County's history. Also located at Heritage Park is the Herbert H. Dow Historical Museum, which explores the history and growth of Dow Chemical Company founded in Midland by Herbert H. Dow. Also located on the campus is the Bradley Home Museum and Carriage House; this 1874 house built by Benjamin F. Bradley allows visitors to see an historic home and furnishings of its time. The Carriage House holds an extensive collection of sleighs and carriages, and it has the largest working blacksmith shop in the Mid-Michigan area.

Winner of a 2005 Michigan Cool Cities grant (a grass-roots, volunteer-based training program to revitalize a downtown area), Downtown Midland offers dining, shopping and entertainment for the whole family.

=== Architecture ===
Alden B. Dow, son of Dow Chemical founder Herbert Dow was an influential architect who brought modern design to his home town. During his 50-plus-year career, he designed and built more than 130 structures. His creations were dynamic and innovative, influenced by his study with Frank Lloyd Wright and began an architectural heritage that is unprecedented in the United States. Dow's work inspired numerous architects, including Glenn Beach, Jackson Hallett, Francis "Red" Warner and Robert Schwartz who created over 400 Mid-century modern structures. that dominate Midland. Tours of the Alden Dow House and Studio showcase his unique and influential style. Alden Dow designed the Grace A. Dow Memorial Library, Midland's public library named in his mother's honor.

=== Notable places ===
- Dow Chemical Company headquarters
- Dow Corning headquarters
- Dow Corning Midland plant
- Herbert H. Dow House
- Midland Center for the Arts
- Midland Civic Arena, a 1,000-seat indoor arena
- Pere Marquette Rail-Trail
- The Tridge, a three-way pedestrian bridge over the Tittabawassee and Chippewa rivers.

=== Sports ===
The Greater Midland umbrella organization includes the Midland Community Center (with multiple swimming pools and exercise facilities), the Coleman Family Center in Warren Township and the North Family Center in Mills Township. They each offer programs for family, youth, adult and senior fitness and fun using equipment, individual and group sports and recreation.

Greater Midland also has specialized sport facilities including the Midland Gymnastics Training Center, the Midland Curling Center, and the Midland Community Tennis Center, which features 32 courts. The tennis center also hosts a USTA Pro Circuit event and was part of the USTA award to Midland as America's Best Tennis Town 2009.

Traditional golfers have several options available: Currie Municipal Golf Course features East and West courses; Sandy Ridge Golf Course is the newest facility in Midland County; the Midland Country Club is private.

Disc golfers can use the Chippewa Banks Disc Golf Course, an 18-hole course located near downtown Midland. It is free to play and open year-round, sunrise to sunset.

Ice skaters of all ages can use Midland's 107,000-square-foot (9,900 m^{2}) Civic Arena, which has two NHL-sized rinks and one Olympic-sized rink.

The Midland BMX bicycle track is located in Midland's Stratford Woods park. Track is closed during inclement weather and when wet. BMX race practices are Tuesdays from 6-8pm; BMX races are Thursdays with registration at 6pm. Closed to the public.

Trilogy Skate Park is a free, 15,000-square-foot (1,400 m^{2}) facility constructed in 1999 and offers outdoor fun for both skateboards and in-line skates. Located near The Tridge, lighting is available after dark.

Midland Community Stadium hosts high school football, soccer, lacrosse plus track and field meets.

The Dow Championship was introduced to the LPGA Tour schedule in 2019. This event is hosted at the Midland Country Club annually. The tournament was founded with the vision of building community and accelerating the efforts of the Great Lakes Bay Region and Dow's strategy by building a world-class and unique LPGA Tour event that positively impacts people's lives.

Midland is also host to the following professional sports teams.

Club	Sport	League	Venue	Logo
Great Lakes Loons	Baseball	Midwest League	Dow Diamond
Tri City Barbarians	Rugby	Michigan Rugby Football Union	St. Charles Park

The Loons are the Single-A Affiliate of the Los Angeles Dodgers of the National League in Major League Baseball

== Government and politics ==
The county government operates the jail, maintains rural roads, operates the major local courts, keeps files of deeds and mortgages, maintains vital records, administers public health regulations, and participates with the state in the provision of welfare and other social services. The county board of commissioners controls the budget but has only limited authority to make laws or ordinances. In Michigan, most local government functions — police and fire, building and zoning, tax assessment, street maintenance, etc. — are the responsibility of individual cities and townships.

=== Sheriff ===
In 2012, Sheriff Jerry Nielsen renamed the Road Patrol Division to the Citizens Assistance Responders Division (CAR). Due to funding cuts, the department no longer had the staff to be proactive and prevent criminal activity. The philosophy changed to respond and provide assistance to citizens.
The Sheriff's Department also operates the 250-bed jail that opened in late 2009. The Sheriff's department redesigned their website in 2006 to provide timely information to citizens and encourage them to submit tips and questions.

=== Elected officials ===
- Prosecuting Attorney: J. Dee Brooks
- Sheriff: Scott Holzinger
- County Clerk: Ann Manary
- County Treasurer: Cathy Lunsford
- Register of Deeds: Jennifer Anway
- Drain Commissioner: Joseph Sova

(information as of February 2025)

=== Board of Commissioners ===
7 members, elected from districts (6 Republicans, 1 Democrat)

District	Commissioner	Party
1	Jeanette M. Snyder	Republican
2	Mark Bone	Republican
3	Larry Schuelke	Republican
4	Jim Stamas	Republican
5	Todd M. Gambrell	Republican
6	Eric Dorrien	Republican
7	Alaynah Smith	Democrat

=== Politics ===
Midland County is rather conservative for an urban county. It has been a consistent stronghold of the Republican Party, having supported its presidential candidates in every election from 1968 onward and all but twice since 1884. It is one of the few counties where Franklin D. Roosevelt was shut out in all four of his successful campaigns.

Most of Midland County is located in Michigan's 8th congressional district, represented by Democrat Kristen McDonald Rivet. The rest is located in Michigan's 2nd congressional district, represented by Republican John Moolenaar. Bill G. Schuette is State Representative for Michigan's 95th House of Representatives district. Roger Hauck is State Senator for the Michigan's 34th Senate district.

United States presidential election results for Midland County, Michigan
Year	Republican		Democratic		Third party(ies)	
Year	No.	%	No.	%	No.	%
1884	1,071	53.36%	883	44.00%	53	2.64%
1888	1,336	49.59%	1,148	42.61%	210	7.80%
1892	1,069	46.16%	815	35.19%	432	18.65%
1896	1,524	48.83%	1,507	48.29%	90	2.88%
1900	1,784	57.64%	1,221	39.45%	90	2.91%
1904	2,107	70.63%	766	25.68%	110	3.69%
1908	1,987	66.97%	875	29.49%	105	3.54%
1912	902	29.09%	671	21.64%	1,528	49.27%
1916	2,104	57.82%	1,454	39.96%	81	2.23%
1920	4,115	78.88%	959	18.38%	143	2.74%
1924	4,004	79.08%	625	12.34%	434	8.57%
1928	4,555	82.25%	964	17.41%	19	0.34%
1932	3,791	50.62%	3,553	47.44%	145	1.94%
1936	3,829	48.12%	3,751	47.14%	377	4.74%
1940	6,269	61.72%	3,834	37.75%	54	0.53%
1944	6,850	65.35%	3,569	34.05%	63	0.60%
1948	5,811	63.19%	3,204	34.84%	181	1.97%
1952	10,508	72.12%	3,945	27.08%	117	0.80%
1956	13,207	74.78%	4,422	25.04%	33	0.19%
1960	14,235	67.56%	6,815	32.34%	21	0.10%
1964	9,020	41.65%	12,587	58.13%	48	0.22%
1968	14,329	60.57%	7,428	31.40%	1,901	8.04%
1972	16,473	61.38%	9,504	35.42%	859	3.20%
1976	17,631	58.57%	11,959	39.73%	511	1.70%
1980	17,828	53.04%	12,019	35.76%	3,763	11.20%
1984	21,521	66.11%	10,769	33.08%	262	0.80%
1988	19,994	59.12%	13,452	39.78%	371	1.10%
1992	16,149	41.81%	13,382	34.65%	9,093	23.54%
1996	16,547	46.01%	15,177	42.20%	4,243	11.80%
2000	21,887	56.28%	15,959	41.04%	1,042	2.68%
2004	24,369	56.31%	18,355	42.41%	551	1.27%
2008	22,263	50.83%	20,701	47.26%	834	1.90%
2012	23,919	56.98%	17,450	41.57%	610	1.45%
2016	23,846	55.75%	15,635	36.55%	3,295	7.70%
2020	27,675	56.28%	20,493	41.67%	1,007	2.05%
2024	28,571	56.80%	20,926	41.60%	804	1.60%

United States Senate election results for Midland County, Michigan1
Year	Republican		Democratic		Third party(ies)	
Year	No.	%	No.	%	No.	%
2024	27,605	55.65%	20,666	41.66%	1,330	2.68%

Michigan Gubernatorial election results for Midland County
Year	Republican		Democratic		Third party(ies)	
Year	No.	%	No.	%	No.	%
2022	20,964	50.85%	19,497	47.30%	763	1.85%

== Communities ==
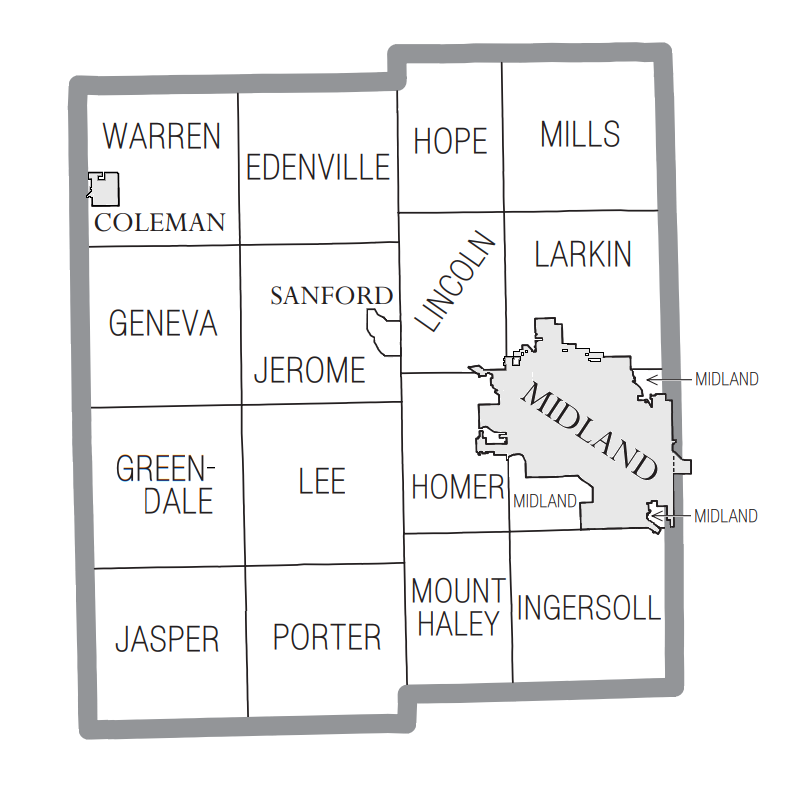
U.S. census data map showing local municipal boundaries within Midland County. Shaded areas represent incorporated cities.

=== Cities ===
- Coleman
- Midland (county seat)

=== Village ===
- Sanford

=== Charter townships ===
- Larkin Charter Township
- Midland Charter Township

=== Civil townships ===
- Edenville Township
- Geneva Township
- Greendale Township
- Homer Township
- Hope Township
- Ingersoll Township
- Jasper Township
- Jerome Township
- Lee Township
- Lincoln Township
- Mills Township
- Mount Haley Township
- Porter Township
- Warren Township

=== Unincorporated communities ===
- Averill
- Edenville
- Floyd
- Gordonville
- Hope
- Laporte
- North Bradley
- Oil City
- Pleasant Valley
- Poseyville
- St. Elmo

== Education ==
=== Primary and secondary education ===
The Midland County Educational Service Agency, based in Midland, services the students in the county. The intermediate school district offers regional special education services, early education programs, and technical career pathways for students of its districts.

Midland County is served by the following regular public school districts:

- Bullock Creek School District
- Coleman Community Schools
- Meridian Public Schools
- Midland Public Schools

The county also has the following independent charter districts:

- Academic and Career Education Academy
- Windover High School

Midland County has the following private schools:

- Blessed Sacrament Elementary School (Roman Catholic)
- Edenville SDA Elementary School (Seventh-day Adventist)
- Good Shepherd Evangelical Lutheran School (WELS)
- Midland Christian School (Nonsectarian)
- Midland Montessori School (Montessori method)
- St. Brigid Catholic School (Roman Catholic)
- St. John's Lutheran School (Lutheran)

=== Colleges and universities ===
- Northwood University
- Davenport University Midland
- Delta College Midland Center

Nearby institutions include:

- Saginaw Valley State University
- Central Michigan University
- Mid Michigan College

=== Public libraries ===
The Grace A. Dow Memorial Library serves the city of Midland and most of the townships in Midland County through contract. The Coleman Area Library serves Coleman, Geneva and Warren Townships and Edenville.

== Infrastructure ==
=== Transportation ===
==== Air travel ====
Scheduled airline service is available from MBS International Airport near Freeland and Flint's Bishop International Airport. The Jack Barstow Municipal Airport, dedicated May 30, 1936, is a general aviation airport operated by the city and available for general aviation aircraft.

==== Public ====
There is no regularly scheduled public transportation. Residents can call in advance to schedule pickup or return transport by one government sponsored agency, "Dial-A-Ride", offering transport within the city only. Then there is "County Connection" a private run public transport for those outside the city of Midland but still within Midland County both for a nominal fee. Both also offer reduced fare rides for elderly and youth.

==== Highways ====
- I-75 Between 1961 and 1973, while much of I-75 between Bay City and Grayling was being constructed, US 10 from Bay City to Clare was utilized as "To I-75". The highway skirted the northern side of Midland until 1986 when construction was completed.
- US 10, a freeway passing the northern edge of Midland, connects with Bay City on the east; Clare and Ludington (as a two-lane highway) to the west.
- Bus. US 10 is a business loop through the downtown.
- M-20 connects Midland with Mount Pleasant and Big Rapids to the west.
- M-30 runs northerly from nearby Sanford to West Branch.
- M-47 links from US 10 east of the city to Saginaw and MBS International Airport

==== Train service ====
In 1874, the Flint and Pere Marquette Railroad linked Midland County to the nationwide railroad network. They were acquired by the Pere Marquette Railway in 1899 and sold to the Chesapeake & Ohio Railway in 1929 but continued under the Pere Marquette name until 1947 when sold to CSX Transportation. In the 1980s, CSX abandoned unprofitable routes and some former rail corridors were converted to Pere Marquette Rail-Trail.

=== Utilities ===
==== Power ====
In 1967, Dow Chemical attained criticality on a 100 kW nuclear research reactor at the Midland facility, primarily as a neutron source and to irradiate samples. The reactor continues to operate as of 2023.

In 1968, Consumers Power (now Consumers Energy) began construction of a nuclear power plant in Midland, primarily for Dow Chemical Company. The project's budget was $257 million, with completion anticipated in 1972. Extreme construction problems caused years of delays and costs soared. The Three Mile Island accident in 1979 resulted in a massive change in nuclear regulatory requirements and system redesign. When it was revealed that the containment buildings were settling and foundation cracks were discovered, Dow canceled their contract with Consumers Power, and the project was abandoned in 1984. The $4.1 billion investment nearly bankrupted Consumers Power. However, in 1985, Consumers Power formed a partnership with eight other companies to convert Midland's abandoned nuclear plant into a gas-fired power plant. Transformation of the plant began in 1986 and was completed at a cost of $500 million. The Midland Cogeneration Venture began producing power in 1991 and that success restored faith in Consumers Power. The facility now produces 10% of the power consumption for the lower peninsula of Michigan.

The predominant provider of electricity and natural gas in Midland County is Consumers Energy.

==== Water and sewer ====
The city of Midland provides sewer and water service to city residents and certain adjoining townships. Due to brackish water in the aquifers, a 65-mile-long (105 km), 72-inch-diameter (180 cm) underground pipeline and intake structure one mile (1.6 km) offshore was constructed in 1948 to supply water from Lake Huron at White Stone Point, north of Au Gres to water treatment plants in Saginaw and Midland. A second 66-inch-diameter (170 cm) underground pipeline and intake structure two miles (3.2 km) offshore were added by 1996. Together they provide 230 million US gallons (870 million litres) per day. The intakes have screens to eliminate fish and debris, and chlorine is added to kill zebra mussels and bacteria. The Saginaw-Midland Municipal Water Supply Corporation (SMMWSC) operates the pumping system which is owned by the cities of Saginaw and Midland.

Midland's water plant adds chemicals to disinfect and further purify it. The water is tested continuously to meet federal and state standards. The potable water is pumped to water towers and underground facilities for storage until demand requires it. The city is capable of delivering up to 48 million US gallons (180 million litres) each day. There is also a 110 million US gallons (420 million litres) open reservoir on the north side of town for use in an emergency or "flow equalization".

The City of Midland, adopted a policy of "No Annexation, No Water" which has led to the growth of the city as well as the surrounding areas. In unincorporated areas without municipal water, private wells and septic systems are required.

==== Garbage ====
The City of Midland, Michigan operates a waste disposal site and landfill for residents and businesses of Midland County. Hazardous waste is accepted quarterly by appointment. City residents have weekly collection of yard waste and household garbage. There is monthly collection of recyclables, large heavy items and brush. Some Midland townships may offer garbage services, but all county residents may dispose of 3 cubic yards (2.3 m^{3}) once a month without charge at the landfill.

==== Telephone & internet ====
Spectrum, AT&T and Eaglenet Services are the primary suppliers of cable/internet services. Most unincorporated areas must rely on satellite service from Viasat or Hughesnet.

=== Healthcare ===
The dominant comprehensive provider of medical care in Midland County is the non-profit MyMichigan Medical Center Midland, affiliated with the University of Michigan and including a 324-bed hospital. Several other entities provide urgent care and family medicine including Pro-Health Urgent Care of Midland, New Hope Urgent Care of Midland and Midland Express Urgent and Family Care.

== Notable people ==
- Keegan Akin, Major League Baseball pitcher
- Bobby Anderson, NFL player, member of College Football Hall of Fame
- Dick Anderson, safety for undefeated 1972 Miami Dolphins
- Jeff Backus, former offensive tackle for NFL's Detroit Lions
- Mary Brown, Michigan state legislator and educator
- Bo Biteman, member of the Wyoming State Senate
- David Lee Camp, former member of United States House of Representatives
- Michael Cohrs, member of Court and Financial Policy Committee Bank of England
- Terry Collins, manager of New York Mets
- Mikey "Bug" Cox, ex-drummer of Coal Chamber
- Leland Doan, president and CEO of Dow Chemical 1949-1962 for 14 years
- Ted Doan, last Dow family member to lead Dow Chemical as president and CEO from 1962 to 1971
- Alden B. Dow, notable architect and son of Herbert Dow
- Grace A. Dow, philanthropist, wife of Herbert Dow
- Herbert H. Dow, founder of Dow Chemical
- Willard Dow, son of Herbert Dow, president and CEO of Dow Chemical for 19 years from 1930 to 1949
- Paul Emmel, MLB umpire
- Gary Gerould, sportscaster for NBA's Sacramento Kings
- Carl Gerstacker, Dow Chemical Company chairman of the board for 17 years
- Cathy Guisewite, cartoonist known for comic strip Cathy
- James Aloysius Hickey, Cardinal Archbishop of Washington, D.C.
- Robert Jarvik, inventor of the Jarvik-7 artificial heart
- Larry Jaster, former MLB pitcher with St. Louis Cardinals, Montreal Expos, and Atlanta Braves
- David Kepler, former Dow Chemical Company CIO and president/chair of Four Lakes Task Force
- Jim Kern, MLB pitcher, attended high school in Midland
- Nancy LaMott, cabaret singer
- Dick Lange, former Major League Baseball pitcher
- Logan Lynn, musician, composer, singer, producer and LGBT activist
- Kevin Mahar, former MLB player (minor league of the Texas Rangers)
- Andrew Maxwell, football player for Michigan State University
- Meredith McGrath, former Women's Tennis Association professional
- Matt Mieske, former baseball player for five MLB teams
- John Moolenaar, U.S. representative for Michigan
- Chuck Moss, member of Michigan House of Representatives
- Howard Mudd, Pro Bowl offensive guard for San Francisco 49ers, assistant coach for Indianapolis Colts
- Joseph P. Overton, creator of the Overton Window
- Jalen Parmele, running back for six NFL teams
- Bill Schuette, former Michigan Attorney General, former District Court of Appeals Judge, former member of United States House of Representatives
- Jim Shaw, visual artist
- Steve Shelley, drummer of Sonic Youth
- Mary P. Sinclair, nuclear activist
- Peter Sinclair, environmental activist
- Charles J. Strosacker, Dow pioneer and philanthropist
- Cheryl Studer, opera singer
- Larry Teal, classical saxophonist and music educator
- Tom Vaughn, jazz pianist and Episcopal priest formerly at St. John's Episcopal Church
- Scott Winchester, former pitcher for Cincinnati Reds
- Roger L. Worsley, educator; reared in Midland; graduated in 1955 from Midland High School
- Andrew Wylie offensive tackle for the Washington Commanders

== See also ==
- List of Michigan State Historic Sites in Midland County, Michigan
- National Register of Historic Places listings in Midland County, Michigan
