= Lee Township, Midland County, Michigan =

Lee Township, Michigan
- Civil township
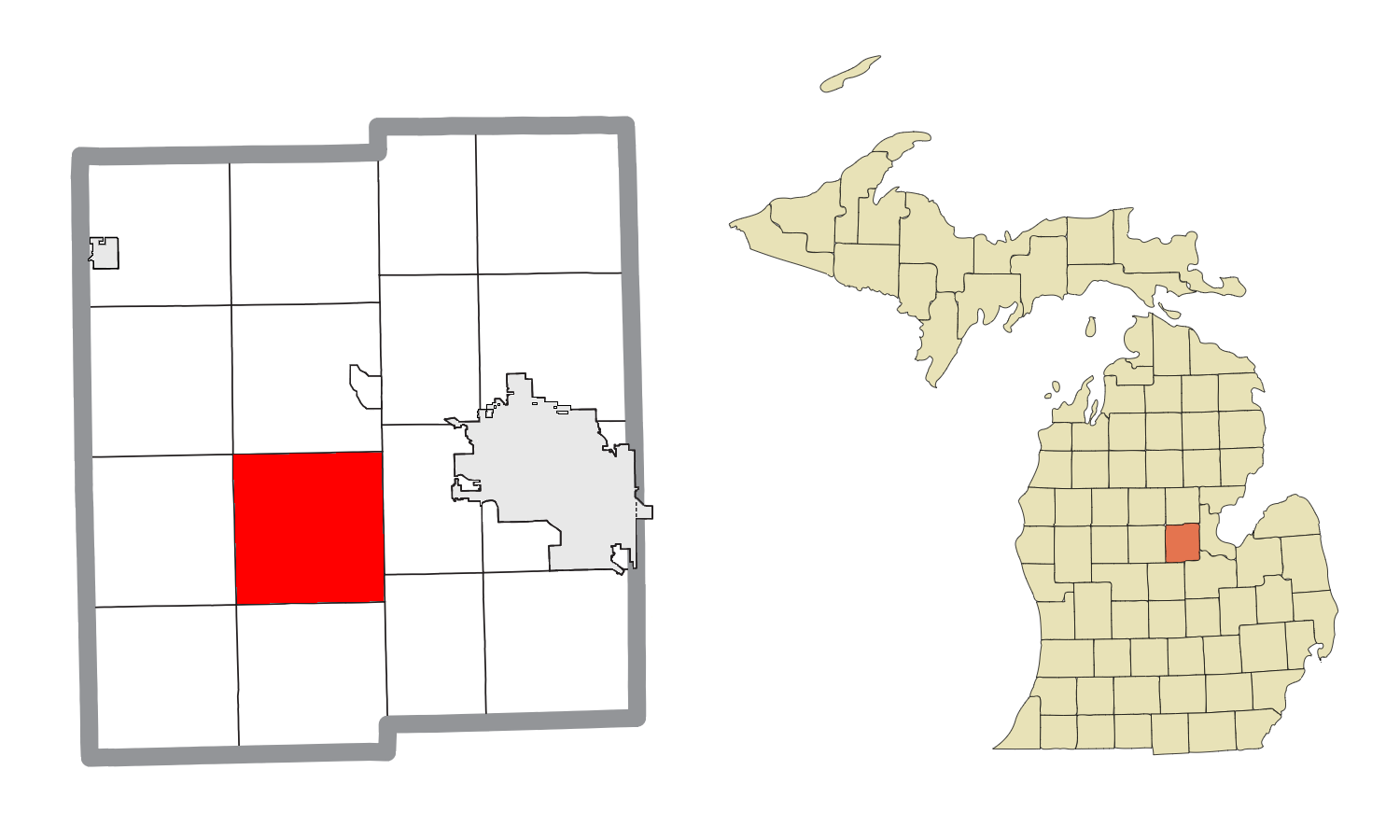
- Location within Midland County and the state of Michigan

- Location within Michigan Location within the United States
- Coordinates: 43°35′46″N 84°25′38″W
- Country: United States
- State: Michigan
- County: Midland
- Established: 1880

Government
  - Supervisor: Doug Kruger
  - Clerk: Laura Dawson

Area
  - Total: 35.9 sq mi (93 km^{2})
  - Land: 35.6 sq mi (92 km^{2})
  - Water: 0.3 sq mi (0.78 km^{2})
- Elevation: 650 ft (198 m)

Population (2020)
  - Total: 3,985
  - Density: 111.9/sq mi (43.2/km^{2})
- Time zone: UTC-5 (Eastern (EST))
  - Summer (DST): UTC-4 (EDT)
- ZIP Codes: 48640 (Midland); 48657 (Sanford); 48615 (Breckenridge); 48883 (Shepherd)
- Area code: 989
- FIPS code: 26-111-46640
- GNIS feature ID: 1626600
- Website: leetownshipmidlandmi.gov

Lee Township is a civil township of Midland County in the U.S. state of Michigan. The population was 3,985 at the 2020 census, down from 4,315 in 2010.

== Communities ==
- Floyd is an unincorporated community in the eastern part of the township at 43°35′21.1″N 84°24′33″W.
- St. Elmo is an unincorporated community in the western part of the township at 43°35′1.1″N 84°28′12″W.

== Geography ==
Lee Township is in central Midland County, west of Midland, the county seat, and south of Sanford. According to the U.S. Census Bureau, the township has a total area of 35.9 square miles (93 km^{2}), of which 35.6 square miles (92 km^{2}) are land and 0.3 square miles (0.8 km^{2}), or 0.87%, are water. The Chippewa River, a tributary of the Tittabawassee River, crosses the township from west to east.

=== Major highways ===
- M-20 serves as an east–west thoroughfare within the township, connecting Midland to the east with Mount Pleasant to the west.
- M-30 is a north–south route that forms the eastern boundary of the township. The highway connects Sanford to the north with Merrill to the south.

== Demographics ==
Historical population
Census	Pop.	Note	%±
1890	264		—
1900	538		103.8%
1910	444		−17.5%
1920	434		−2.3%
1930	571		31.6%
1940	777		36.1%
1950	1,125		44.8%
1960	1,520		35.1%
1970	2,531		66.5%
1980	3,325		31.4%
1990	4,017		20.8%
2000	4,411		9.8%
2010	4,315		−2.2%
2020	3,985		−7.6%
U.S. Decennial Census

As of the census of 2000, there were 4,411 people, 1,514 households, and 1,200 families residing in the township. The population density was 122.6 inhabitants per square mile (47.3/km^{2}). There were 1,623 housing units at an average density of 45.1 per square mile (17.4/km^{2}). The racial makeup of the township was 96.98% White, 0.18% African American, 0.86% Native American, 0.16% Asian, 0.23% from other races, and 1.59% from two or more races. Hispanic or Latino of any race were 1.02% of the population.

There were 1,514 households, out of which 42.9% had children under the age of 18 living with them, 62.1% were married couples living together, 11.5% had a female householder with no husband present, and 20.7% were non-families. 15.1% of all households were made up of individuals, and 4.1% had someone living alone who was 65 years of age or older. The average household size was 2.90 and the average family size was 3.21.

In the township the population was spread out, with 31.4% under the age of 18, 8.0% from 18 to 24, 33.0% from 25 to 44, 21.0% from 45 to 64, and 6.6% who were 65 years of age or older. The median age was 32 years. For every 100 females, there were 100.9 males. For every 100 females age 18 and over, there were 97.8 males.

The median income for a household in the township was $36,518, and the median income for a family was $40,871. Males had a median income of $32,443 versus $19,176 for females. The per capita income for the township was $15,289. About 11.8% of families and 14.9% of the population were below the poverty line, including 20.4% of those under age 18 and 5.5% of those age 65 or over.
