= Mills Township, Midland County, Michigan =

Mills Township, Michigan
- Civil township
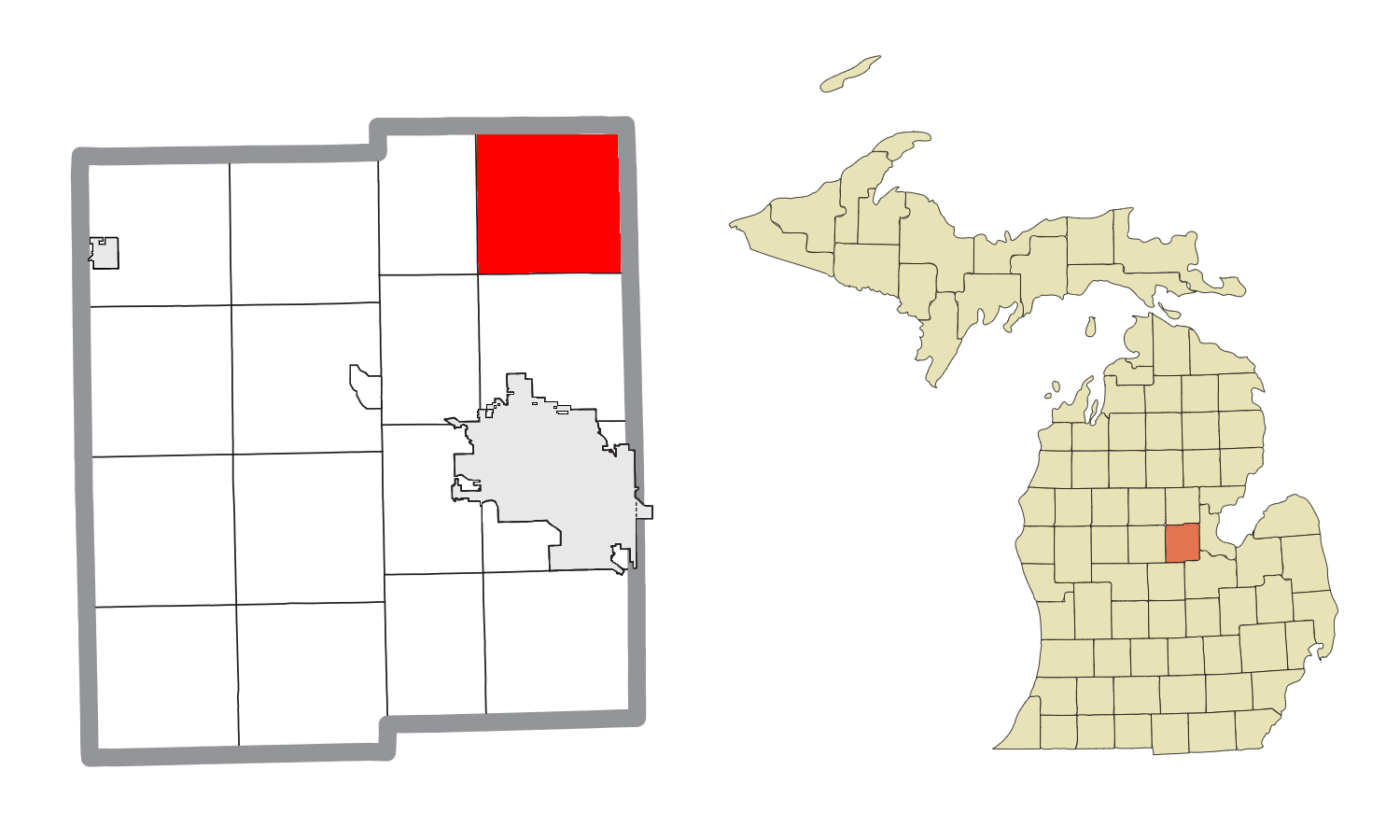
- Location within Midland County and the state of Michigan

- Location within Michigan Location within the United States
- Coordinates: 43°47′09″N 84°13′47″W
- Country: United States
- State: Michigan
- County: Midland
- Established: 1894

Government
  - Supervisor: Daniel Bloom
  - Clerk: Kim Sweet

Area
  - Total: 36.0 sq mi (93 km^{2})
  - Land: 35.6 sq mi (92 km^{2})
  - Water: 0.4 sq mi (1.0 km^{2})
- Elevation: 676 ft (206 m)

Population (2020)
  - Total: 1,775
  - Density: 49.9/sq mi (19.3/km^{2})
- Time zone: UTC-5 (Eastern (EST))
  - Summer (DST): UTC-4 (EDT)
- ZIP Codes: 48642 (Midland); 48652 (Rhodes)
- Area code: 989
- FIPS code: 26-111-54320
- GNIS feature ID: 1626745
- Website: millstownship.org

Mills Township is a civil township of Midland County in the U.S. state of Michigan, United States. The population was 1,775 at the 2020 census, down from 1,939 in 2010.

== Geography ==
The township is in the northeast corner of Midland County, bordered to the north by Gladwin County and to the east by Bay County. According to the United States Census Bureau, the township has a total area of 36.0 square miles (93 km^{2}), of which 35.6 square miles (92 km^{2}) are land and 0.4 square miles (1.0 km^{2}), or 1.12%, are water. The township is drained by tributaries of the Kawkawlin River, except for the southwest corner, which is drained by tributaries of the Tittabawassee River. The entire township is part of the watershed of Lake Huron's Saginaw Bay.

== Demographics ==
Historical population
Census	Pop.	Note	%±
1900	241		—
1910	297		23.2%
1920	324		9.1%
1930	257		−20.7%
1940	789		207.0%
1950	523		−33.7%
1960	421		−19.5%
1970	1,005		138.7%
1980	1,461		45.4%
1990	1,635		11.9%
2000	1,871		14.4%
2010	1,939		3.6%
2020	1,775		−8.5%
U.S. Decennial Census

As of the census of 2000, there were 1,871 people, 659 households, and 514 families residing in the township. The population density was 53.5 inhabitants per square mile (20.7/km^{2}). There were 689 housing units at an average density of 19.7 per square mile (7.6/km^{2}). The racial makeup of the township was 97.97% White, 0.21% African American, 0.86% Native American, 0.11% Asian, 0.21% from other races, and 0.64% from two or more races. Hispanic or Latino of any race were 1.92% of the population.

There were 659 households, out of which 39.3% had children under the age of 18 living with them, 65.6% were married couples living together, 7.3% had a female householder with no husband present, and 22.0% were non-families. 16.8% of all households were made up of individuals, and 5.2% had someone living alone who was 65 years of age or older. The average household size was 2.83 and the average family size was 3.20.

In the township the population was spread out, with 29.0% under the age of 18, 7.5% from 18 to 24, 33.0% from 25 to 44, 22.8% from 45 to 64, and 7.6% who were 65 years of age or older. The median age was 35 years. For every 100 females, there were 102.1 males. For every 100 females age 18 and over, there were 100.6 males.

The median income for a household in the township was $40,530, and the median income for a family was $43,971. Males had a median income of $35,050 versus $23,516 for females. The per capita income for the township was $16,718. About 7.1% of families and 10.1% of the population were below the poverty line, including 12.6% of those under age 18 and 4.6% of those age 65 or over.
