= Larkin Charter Township, Michigan =

Larkin Township, Michigan
- Charter township
- Larkin Charter Township
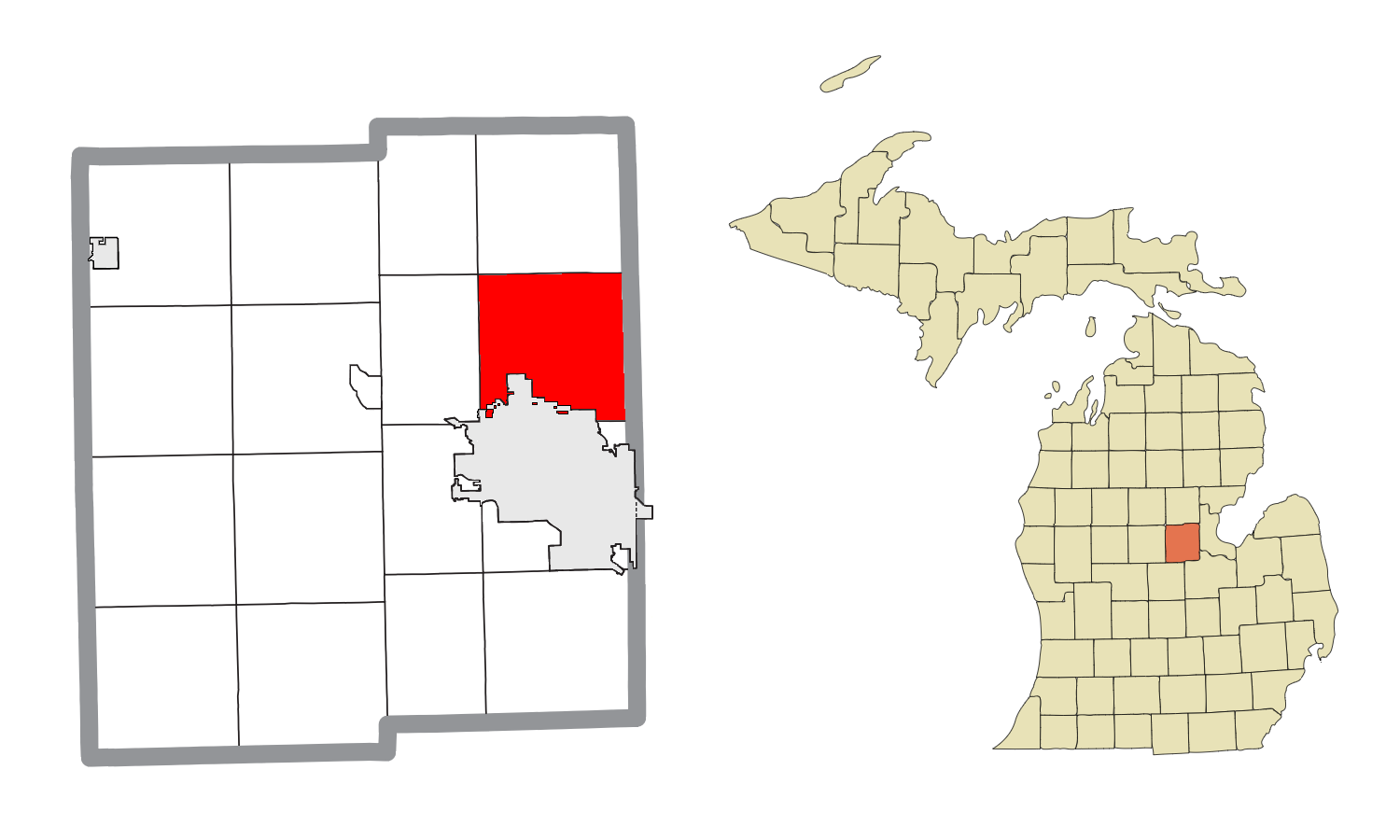
- Location within Midland County and the state of Michigan

- Location within Michigan
- Coordinates: 43°41′33″N 84°14′04″W
- Country: United States
- State: Michigan
- County: Midland
- Established: 1879

Government
  - Supervisor: Maria Sandow
  - Clerk: Sandra Reardon

Area
  - Total: 32.06 sq mi (83.0 km^{2})
  - Land: 32.00 sq mi (82.9 km^{2})
  - Water: 0.06 sq mi (0.16 km^{2})
- Elevation: 682 ft (208 m)

Population (2020)
  - Total: 5,331
  - Density: 166.6/sq mi (64.3/km^{2})
- Time zone: UTC-5 (Eastern (EST))
  - Summer (DST): UTC-4 (EDT)
- ZIP Code: 48642 (Midland)
- Area code: 989
- FIPS code: 26-111-46160
- GNIS feature ID: 1626592
- Website: www.larkintownship.org

Larkin Charter Township is a charter township of Midland County in the U.S. state of Michigan. The population was 5,331 at the 2020 census.

== Geography ==
The township is in eastern Midland County, bordered to the south by the city of Midland, the county seat, and to the east by Bay County. According to the U.S. Census Bureau, the township has a total area of 32.06 square miles (83.04 km^{2}), of which 32.00 square miles (82.88 km^{2}) are land and 0.06 square miles (0.16 km^{2}), or 0.20%, are water. The west side of the township is drained by Sturgeon Creek, a south-flowing tributary of the Tittabawassee River and part of the Saginaw River watershed, while the east side is drained by tributaries of the Kawkawlin River, which flows east to Lake Huron just north of the mouth of the Saginaw.

== Demographics ==
Historical population
Census	Pop.	Note	%±
1880	210		—
1890	877		317.6%
1900	702		−20.0%
1910	777		10.7%
1920	808		4.0%
1930	845		4.6%
1940	1,068		26.4%
1950	1,451		35.9%
1960	2,032		40.0%
1970	2,509		23.5%
1980	3,303		31.6%
1990	3,588		8.6%
2000	4,514		25.8%
2010	5,136		13.8%
2020	5,331		3.8%
U.S. Decennial Census

As of the census of 2000, there were 4,514 people, 1,502 households, and 1,288 families residing in the township. The population density was 137.8 inhabitants per square mile (53.2/km^{2}). There were 1,542 housing units at an average density of 47.1 per square mile (18.2/km^{2}). The racial makeup of the township was 96.96% White, 0.73% African American, 0.18% Native American, 0.84% Asian, 0.20% from other races, and 1.09% from two or more races. Hispanic or Latino of any race were 1.11% of the population.

There were 1,502 households, out of which 45.7% had children under the age of 18 living with them, 79.1% were married couples living together, 3.9% had a female householder with no husband present, and 14.2% were non-families. 12.1% of all households were made up of individuals, and 3.7% had someone living alone who was 65 years of age or older. The average household size was 3.00 and the average family size was 3.27.

In the township the population was spread out, with 31.6% under the age of 18, 5.8% from 18 to 24, 30.5% from 25 to 44, 25.1% from 45 to 64, and 7.0% who were 65 years of age or older. The median age was 37 years. For every 100 females, there were 103.7 males. For every 100 females age 18 and over, there were 101.3 males.

The median income for a household in the township was $80,177, and the median income for a family was $91,053. Males had a median income of $72,104 versus $31,108 for females. The per capita income for the township was $29,996. About 1.3% of families and 2.5% of the population were below the poverty line, including 1.6% of those under age 18 and 8.8% of those age 65 or over.
