= Salt River (Michigan) =

Salt River is the name of two streams in the U.S. state of Michigan.

== Macomb County ==
The Salt River in Macomb County empties into Anchor Bay of Lake Saint Clair in Chesterfield Township at 42°39′12″N 82°47′06″W. The headwaters rise just west of Richmond 17.9 miles (28.8 km) of stream distance to the north. The river's greatest depth is 6 feet (2 m), although it is quite shallow for most of its length. The part of the river by Lake Saint Clair is lined with marinas. Further inland, it soon turns into a large marsh and forested area. Further north, the river runs through light residential areas and farmlands. Most of the river's watershed is rural with suburban lands near the lake. The river is slow flowing and quite swampy in most parts. Some of the named tributaries include:

- Fish Creek
- Kirkham Drain
- Gibbons Drain
- Shook Drain
- Fistler Drain

== Midland/Isabella counties ==
The Salt River, also known as the Big Salt River, is a 19.3-mile-long (31.1 km) river that rises in northeastern Isabella County. The main branch is formed by the confluence of the North and South branches in Denver Township at 43°40′57″N 84°36′39″W near the boundary between Isabella and Midland County. The north branch is formed less than five miles north and west of this point by the confluence of several drains, including Killenbeck, Sharps, McDonald, Lamphere, and Loomis. The river has abundant river redhorse and common carp populations, especially by the Geneva Road bridge. The South Branch is fed by Jordan Creek, Lewis Drain, and Spring Creek. The main branch flows mostly eastward into the Tittabawassee River in Sanford at 43°40′26″N 84°23′20″W.

Some of the named tributaries of the main branch include:

- Teed Drain
  - Durbin Drain
- Mud Creek
- Bluff Creek
  - Howe Drain
    - Bliss Drain
  - Bickerton Drain
  - High Drain
- Howard Creek
- Lowe Drain

Note that there are also a Salt Creek and Little Salt Creek in southern Isabella and Midland counties, both of which are tributaries of the Chippewa River.
