= Gladwin Community Schools =

School district in Michigan

Address
- 401 N Bowery Avenue Gladwin, Gladwin County, Michigan, 48624; United States

District information
- Grades: Pre-Kindergarten-12
- Superintendent: Chuck Frisbie
- Schools: 5
- Budget: $22,817,000 2021-2022 expenditures
- NCES District ID: 2615990

Students and staff
- Students: 1,655 (2024-2025)
- Teachers: 85.1 (on an FTE basis) (2024-2025)
- Staff: 229.86 FTE (2024-2025)
- Student–teacher ratio: 19.45 (2024-2025)

Other information
- Website: www.gladwinschools.net

Gladwin Community Schools is a public school district in Gladwin County, Michigan. It serves Gladwin and the townships of Butman, Gladwin, Sage, and Secord, and parts of the townships of Buckeye, Grout, Hay, and Sherman. It also serves parts of Arthur and Hamilton townships in Clare County.

== History ==
Gladwin had established a public school by 1889, when it was described in a local newspaper. It had 110 students that year, and the high school was held in a single classroom. By 1890, the "primary room" (or elementary school classroom) in the school was so crowded that two students had to sit in each chair.

A new school was built in 1905 that housed the high school. An addition was built in 1936 that contained a science lab, home economics room, and four general classrooms.

On January 16, 1951, two students were killed and twenty injured in a school bus crash. The bus collided with a milk truck on a one-way bridge approach, not being able to stop in time due to icy roads, and fell upside-down into the north branch of the Cedar River below.

Gladwin Elementary was dedicated in May 1953. It allowed elementary students to move out of the high school building. Another large addition was built at the high school in 1957. On January 14, 1962, the community celebrated the dedication of the Intermediate School and a four-classroom addition to the elementary school.

In 1967, the 1905 section of the high school was condemned by the state fire marshal and construction of an addition was begun to replace it. The current high school was built in 1988. The former high school is currently used as the junior high school.

== Schools ==
Schools in Gladwin Community Schools district
School	Address	Notes
Gladwin Elementary	600 W 1st Street, Gladwin	Built 1953.
Gladwin Intermediate School	780 W. 1st Street, Gladwin	Built 1962.
Gladwin Junior High School	401 N Bowery Ave, Gladwin	Built 1936.
Gladwin High School	1400 N Spring St, Gladwin	Built 1988.
Gladwin Alternative Education / C.O.O.L. School	3982 W. M-61	Alternative high school
