= South Branch Little Sugar River =

Coordinates: 44°04′13″N 84°24′17″W

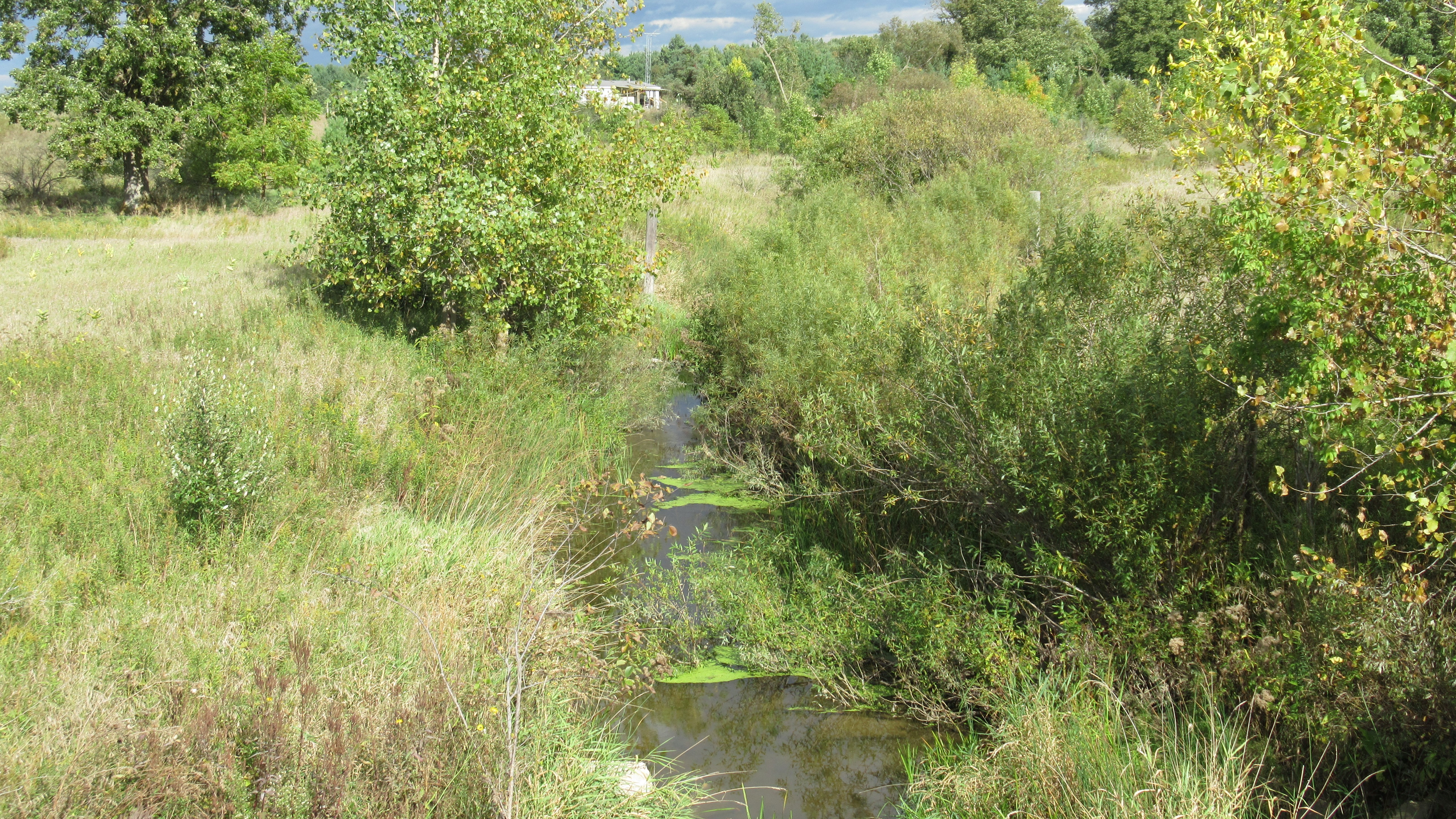
- Along Hockaday Road in Gladwin Township

- Location within the state of Michigan

Location
- Country: United States

Physical characteristics
- Source
  - location: Michigan

The South Branch Little Sugar River is an 11.5-mile-long (18.5 km) river in Gladwin County, Michigan, United States. It is a tributary of the Sugar River, which flows via the Tittabawassee River to the Saginaw River.

== See also ==
- List of rivers of Michigan
