= Arthur Township, Michigan =

- Civil township
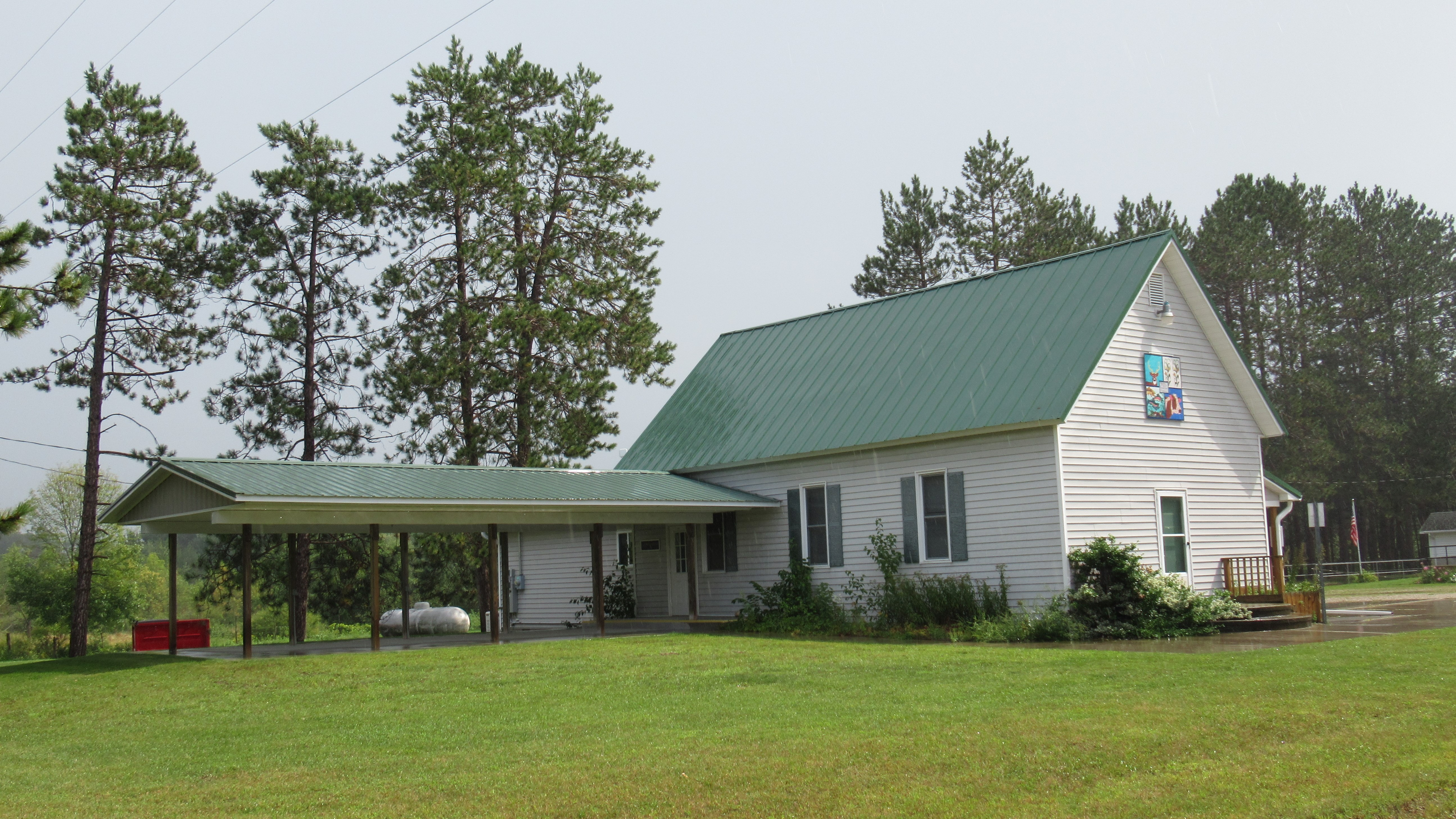
- Arthur Township Hall

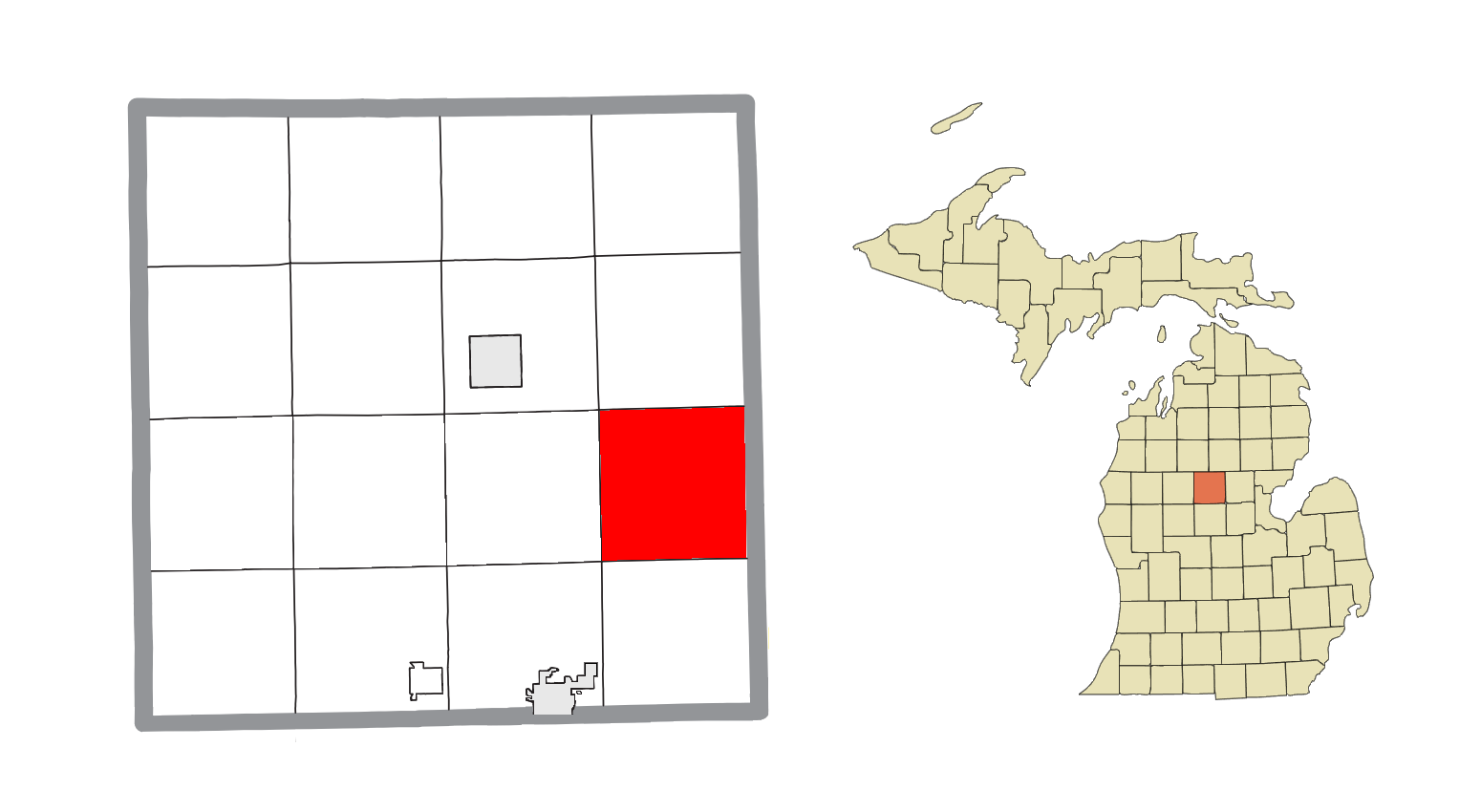
- Location within Clare County

- Location within the state of Michigan Location within the United States
- Coordinates: 43°57′00″N 84°40′35″W
- Country: United States
- State: Michigan
- County: Clare
- Established: 1884

Government
  - Supervisor: Matthew Bednorek
  - Clerk: Janice LaRose

Area
  - Total: 36.21 sq mi (93.78 km^{2})
  - Land: 36.02 sq mi (93.29 km^{2})
  - Water: 0.19 sq mi (0.49 km^{2})
- Elevation: 883 ft (269 m)

Population (2020)
  - Total: 676
  - Density: 18.8/sq mi (7.3/km^{2})
- Time zone: UTC-5 (Eastern (EST))
  - Summer (DST): UTC-4 (EDT)
- ZIP code(s): 48617 (Clare); 48624 (Gladwin)
- Area code: 989
- FIPS code: 26-03620
- GNIS feature ID: 1625851
- Website: arthurtownshipmi.com

Arthur Township is a civil township of Clare County in the U.S. state of Michigan. The township population was 676 at the 2020 census.

== Geography ==
According to the U.S. Census Bureau, the township has a total area of 36.21 square miles (93.78 km^{2}), of which 36.02 square miles (93.29 km^{2}) is land and 0.19 square miles (0.49 km^{2}) (0.52%) is water.

The middle and north branch of the Tobacco River flows through the township.

=== Major highways ===
- M-61 (E. Gladwin Road) forms the entire northern boundary of the township with Hamilton Township.

== Demographics ==
As of the census of 2000, there were 667 people, 245 households, and 192 families residing in the township. The population density was 18.5 inhabitants per square mile (7.1/km^{2}). There were 330 housing units at an average density of 9.1 per square mile (3.5/km^{2}). The racial makeup of the township was 98.50% White, 0.45% African American, 0.15% Native American, and 0.90% from two or more races.

There were 245 households, out of which 31.8% had children under the age of 18 living with them, 69.8% were married couples living together, 4.9% had a female householder with no husband present, and 21.6% were non-families. 18.4% of all households were made up of individuals, and 8.6% had someone living alone who was 65 years of age or older. The average household size was 2.69 and the average family size was 3.07.

In the township the population was spread out, with 27.7% under the age of 18, 5.4% from 18 to 24, 27.6% from 25 to 44, 25.5% from 45 to 64, and 13.8% who were 65 years of age or older. The median age was 39 years. For every 100 females, there were 105.2 males. For every 100 females age 18 and over, there were 96.7 males.

The median income for a household in the township was $39,148, and the median income for a family was $42,404. Males had a median income of $31,458 versus $21,979 for females. The per capita income for the township was $18,380. About 6.2% of families and 8.5% of the population were below the poverty line, including 11.1% of those under age 18 and 3.0% of those age 65 or over.

== Education ==
Despite is rural environment and low population, the township is divided among four different public school district. The northeast corner of the township is served by Gladwin Community Schools to the east in Gladwin. The southeast corner of the township is served by Beaverton Rural Schools to the southeast in Beaverton. The southwestern portion of the township is served by Clare Public Schools to the southwest in Clare. A small portion of the northwest corner of the township is served by Harrison Community Schools to the northwest in Harrison.
