= Hamilton Township, Michigan =

Hamilton Township may refer to the following places in the U.S. state of Michigan:

- Hamilton Township, Clare County, Michigan
- Hamilton Township, Gratiot County, Michigan
- Hamilton Township, Van Buren County, Michigan

== See also ==
- Hamilton, Michigan, an unincorporated community in Allegan County
