= Sugar River (Michigan) =

Coordinates: 44°01′04″N 84°21′18″W

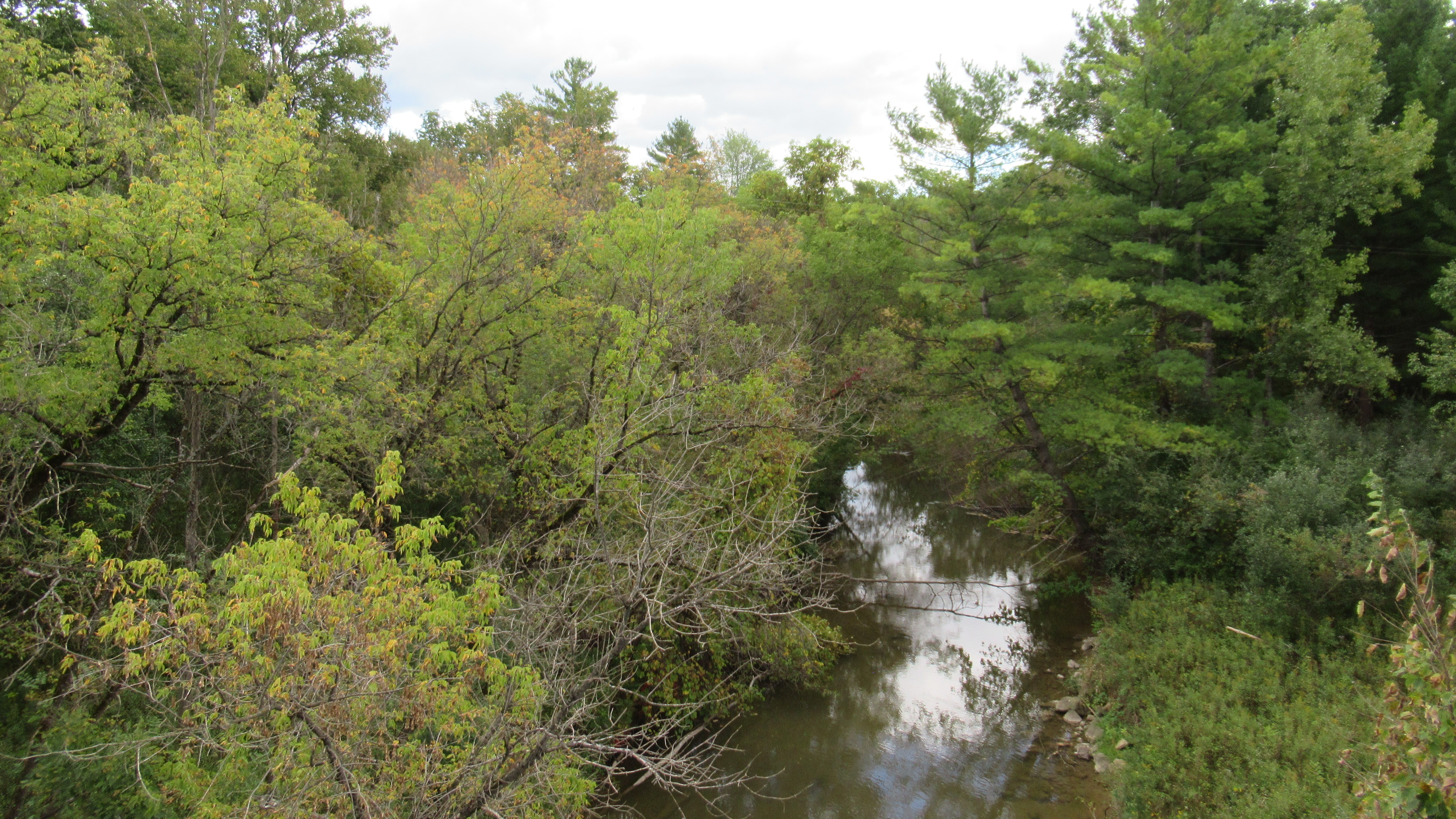
- The river along M-30 in Secord Township

- Location within the state of Michigan

Location
- Country: United States

Physical characteristics
- Source
  - location: Michigan

The Sugar River is a 26.0-mile-long (41.8 km) river in Roscommon and Gladwin counties in the U.S. state of Michigan. It is a tributary of the Tittabawassee River, which flows to the Saginaw River.

== See also ==
- List of rivers of Michigan
