= Bourret Township, Michigan =

- Civil township
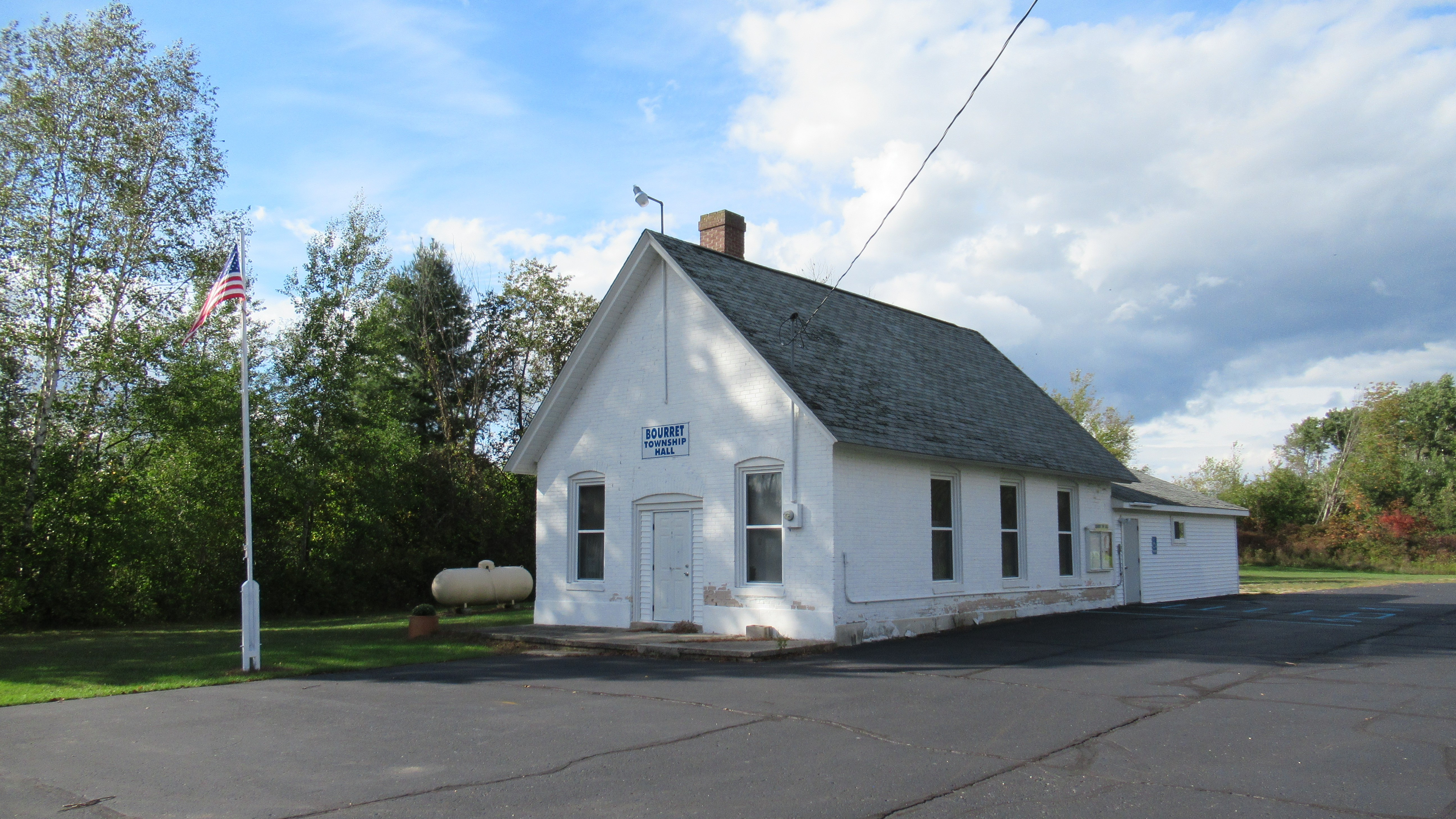
- Bourret Township Hall

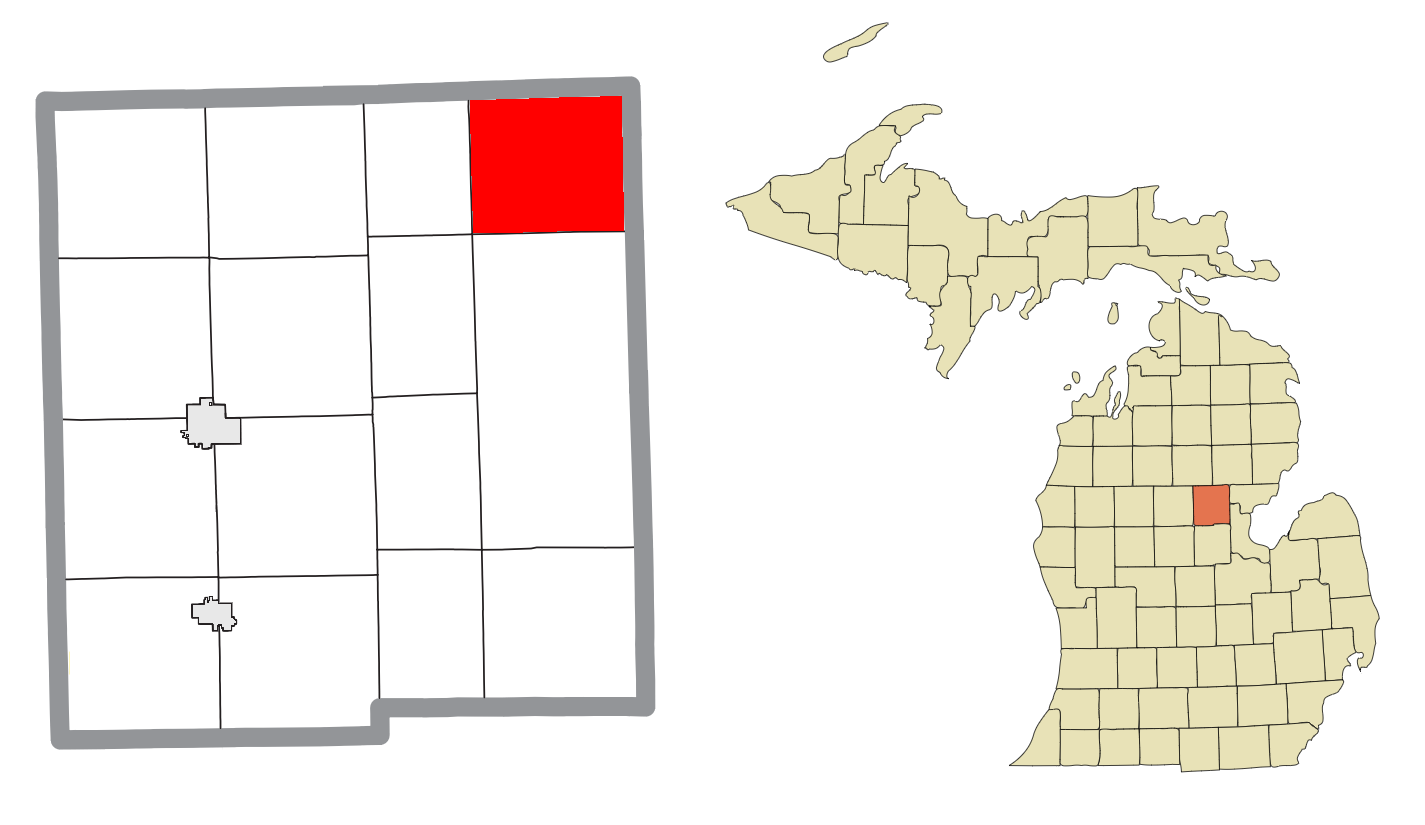
- Location within Gladwin County

- Location within the state of Michigan Location within the United States
- Coordinates: 44°6′51″N 84°15′45″W
- Country: United States
- State: Michigan
- County: Gladwin
- Established: 1897

Government
  - Supervisor: Tony Marshall
  - Clerk: Lisa Ball

Area
  - Total: 32.73 sq mi (84.77 km^{2})
  - Land: 32.34 sq mi (83.76 km^{2})
  - Water: 0.39 sq mi (1.01 km^{2})
- Elevation: 771 ft (235 m)

Population (2020)
  - Total: 390
  - Density: 12/sq mi (4.7/km^{2})
- Time zone: UTC-5 (Eastern (EST))
  - Summer (DST): UTC-4 (EDT)
- ZIP code(s): 48610 (Alger)
- Area code: 989
- FIPS code: 26-09720
- GNIS feature ID: 1625963
- Website: Official website

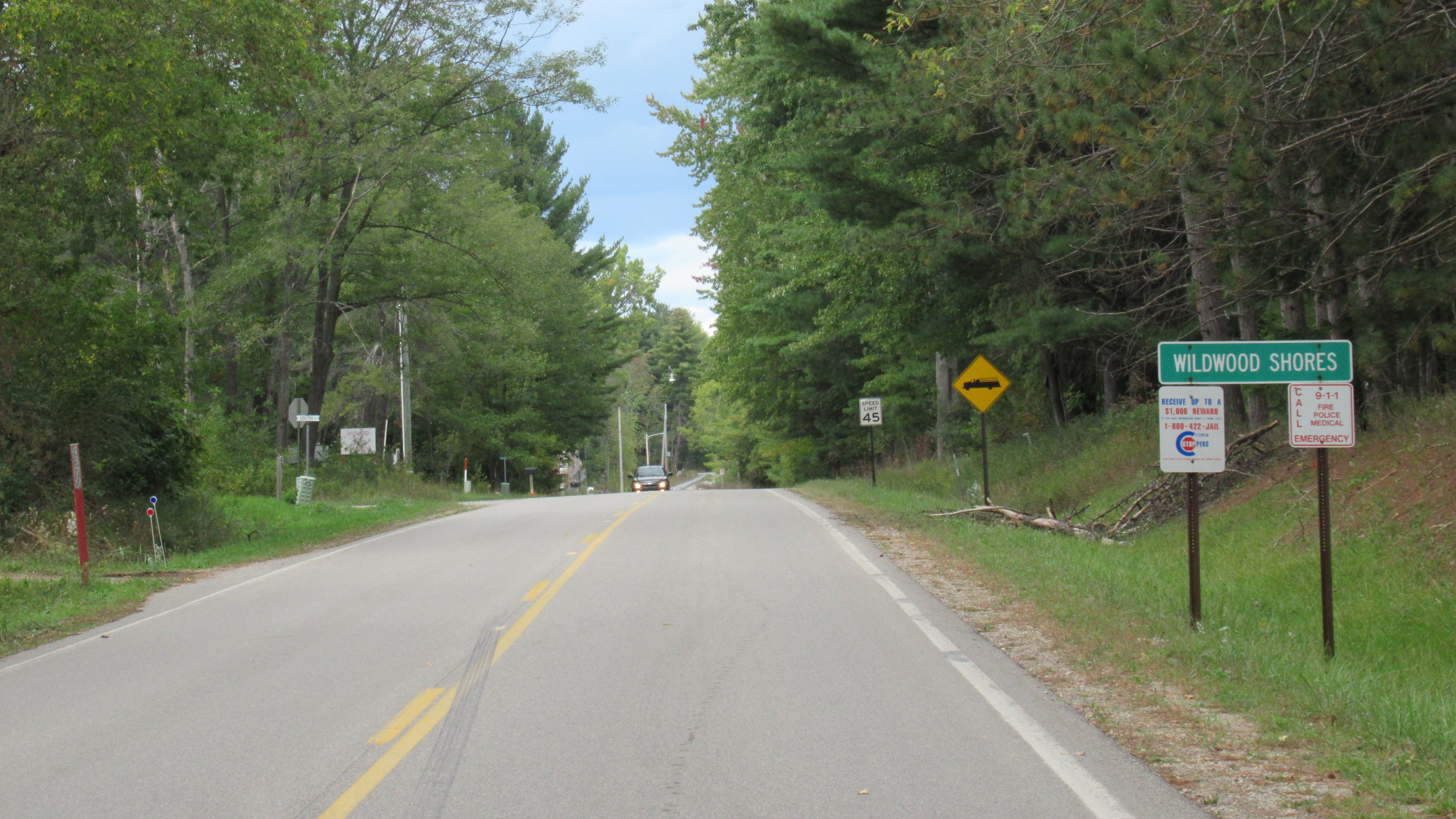
Unincorporated community of Wildwood Shores along Wildwood Drive

Bourret Township is a civil township of Gladwin County in the U.S. state of Michigan. As of the 2020 census, the township population was 390.

== Communities ==
- Wildwood Shores is an unincorporated community within the township at 44°05′46″N 84°16′14″W. The community is situated along the Tittabawassee River in the southwest portion of the township.

== Geography ==
According to the U.S. Census Bureau, the township has a total area of 32.73 square miles (84.77 km^{2}), of which 32.34 square miles (83.76 km^{2}) is land and 0.39 square miles (1.01 km^{2}) (1.19%) is water.

The Tittabawassee River runs through the township. The river is dammed at the nearby Secord Dam, providing water frontage for many vacation homes.

=== Major highways ===
- I-75 runs just to the east of the township and is accessible via exit 202 (Alger Road).
- M-30 curves east–north through the northwest corner of the township.

== Demographics ==
As of the census of 2000, there were 471 people, 211 households, and 143 families residing in the township. The population density was 14.6 inhabitants per square mile (5.6/km^{2}). There were 516 housing units at an average density of 15.9 per square mile (6.1/km^{2}). The racial makeup of the township was 97.03% White, 0.42% Native American, 0.42% Asian, 0.85% from other races, and 1.27% from two or more races. Hispanic or Latino of any race were 0.85% of the population.

There were 211 households, out of which 18.0% had children under the age of 18 living with them, 63.5% were married couples living together, 2.8% had a female householder with no husband present, and 31.8% were non-families. 28.4% of all households were made up of individuals, and 16.6% had someone living alone who was 65 years of age or older. The average household size was 2.23 and the average family size was 2.69.

In the township the population was spread out, with 18.3% under the age of 18, 5.3% from 18 to 24, 18.5% from 25 to 44, 36.5% from 45 to 64, and 21.4% who were 65 years of age or older. The median age was 50 years. For every 100 females, there were 113.1 males. For every 100 females age 18 and over, there were 109.2 males.

The median income for a household in the township was $26,103, and the median income for a family was $31,136. Males had a median income of $39,000 versus $21,528 for females. The per capita income for the township was $16,094. About 12.7% of families and 20.9% of the population were below the poverty line, including 35.1% of those under age 18 and 12.6% of those age 65 or over.
