= Butman Township, Michigan =

- Civil township
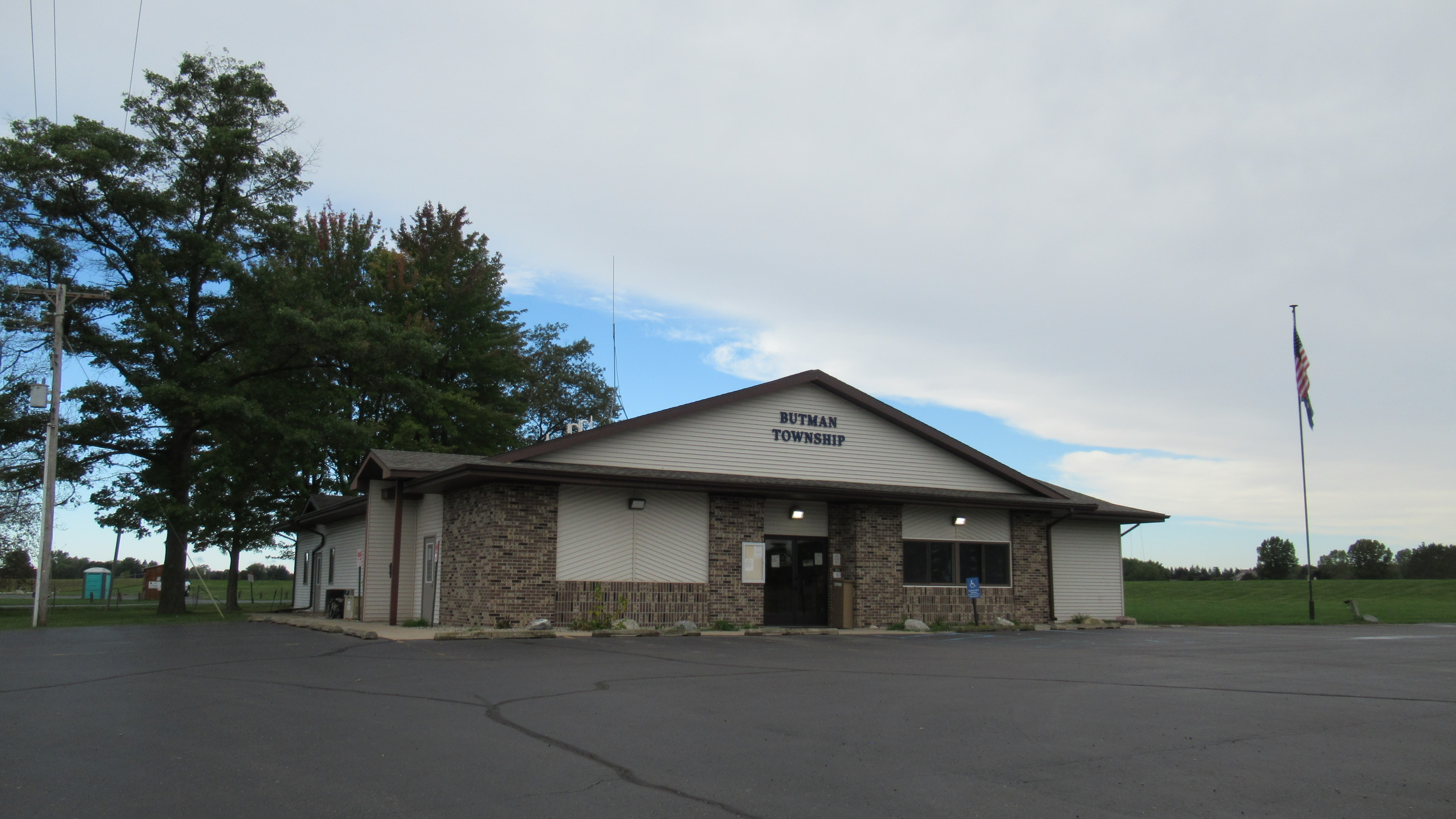
- Butman Township Hall

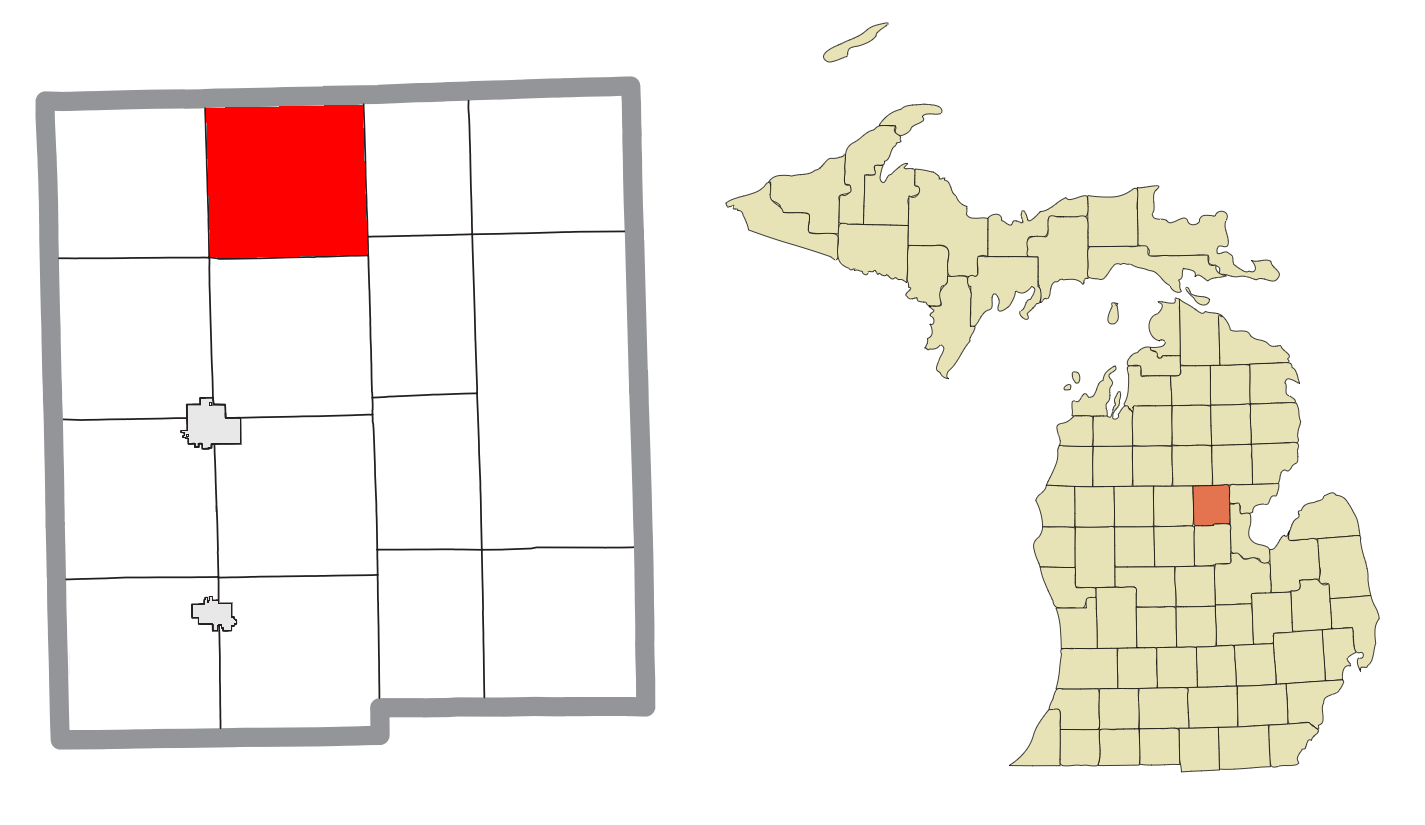
- Location within Gladwin County

- Location within the state of Michigan Location within the United States
- Coordinates: 44°7′10″N 84°26′47″W
- Country: United States
- State: Michigan
- County: Gladwin
- Established: 1883

Government
  - Supervisor: Danny Gonzales
  - Clerk: Alayna Alexander

Area
  - Total: 35.64 sq mi (92.31 km^{2})
  - Land: 35.00 sq mi (90.65 km^{2})
  - Water: 1.64 sq mi (4.25 km^{2})
- Elevation: 840 ft (256 m)

Population (2020)
  - Total: 2,086
  - Density: 59.60/sq mi (23.01/km^{2})
- Time zone: UTC-5 (Eastern (EST))
  - Summer (DST): UTC-4 (EDT)
- ZIP code(s): 48624 (Gladwin)
- Area code: 989
- FIPS code: 26-12180
- GNIS feature ID: 1626014
- Website: Official website

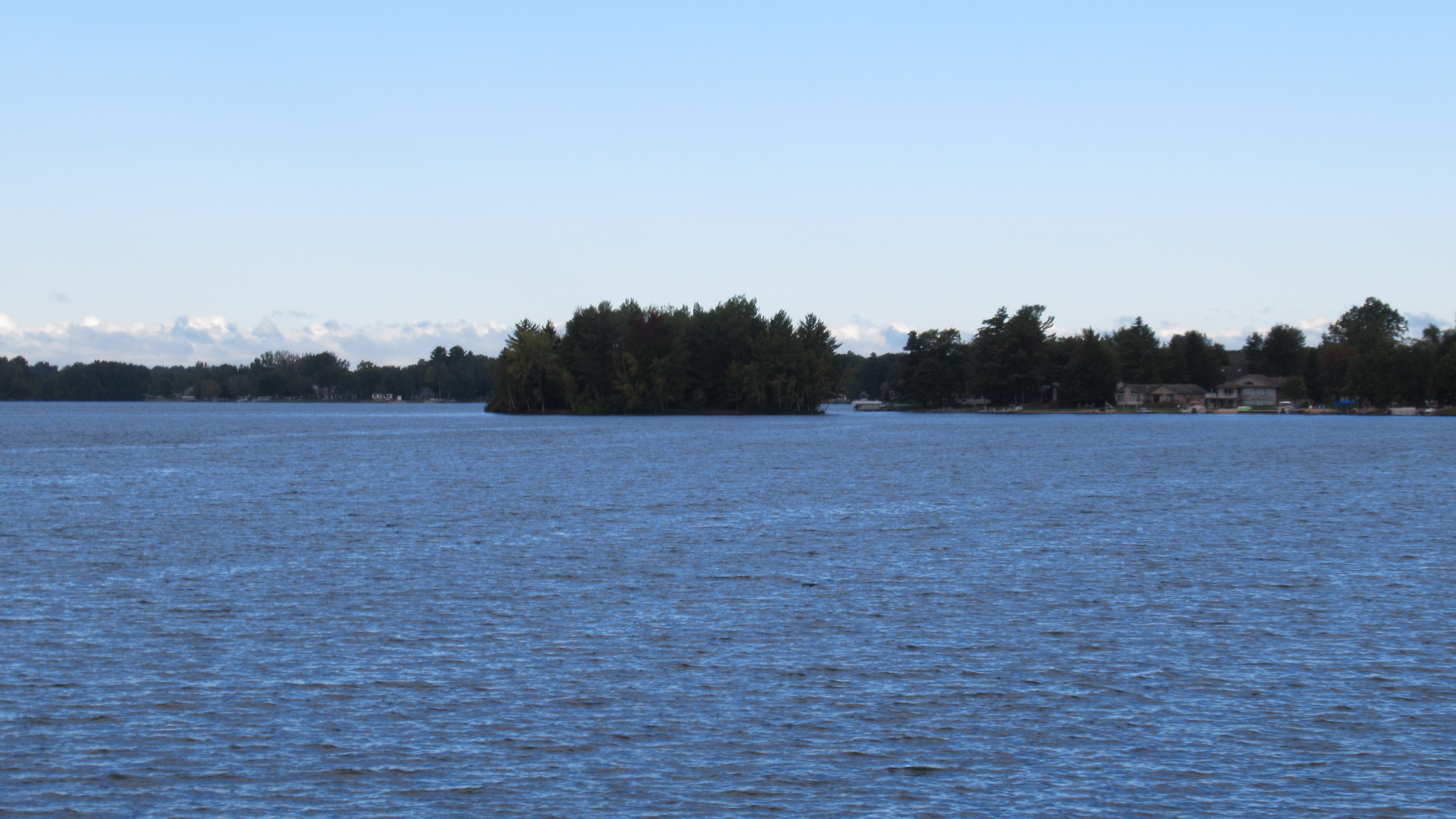
Lake Lancer

Butman Township is a civil township of Gladwin County in the U.S. state of Michigan. As of the 2020 census, the township population was 2,086.

== History ==
Butman Township was organized in 1883. The township was named after Myron Butman, a businessman in the lumber industry.

== Communities ==
- Butman is an unincorporated community in the township at the junction of Butman and Cemetery county roads at 44°08′21″N 84°28′03″W.
- Hockaday is an unincorporated community in the township at the junction of Hockaday and Ritchie county roads at 44°05′16″N 84°25′38″W. The community was named after Robert Hockaday, a local merchant.
- Sugar Rapids is an unincorporated community in the township on the Sugar River at the junction of Littleton and Ritchie county roads, about one mile east of Hockaday at 44°05′17″N 84°24′28″W.

== Geography ==
According to the U.S. Census Bureau, the township has a total area of 35.64 square miles (92.31 km^{2}), of which 35.00 square miles (90.65 km^{2}) is land and 1.64 square miles (4.25 km^{2}) (4.60%) is water.

=== Major highways ===
- M-18 touches the southwest corner of the township at a sharp 90° angle in the highway, but it does not run through township.
- M-30 runs south–north and forms most of the eastern boundary of the township.
- F-97, locally named Round Lake Road, runs south–north and forms most of the western boundary of the township.

== Demographics ==
As of the census of 2000, there were 1,947 people, 853 households, and 690 families residing in the township. The population density was 57.2 inhabitants per square mile (22.1/km^{2}). There were 1,482 housing units at an average density of 43.5 per square mile (16.8/km^{2}). The racial makeup of the township was 98.36% White, 0.10% African American, 0.31% Native American, 0.05% Asian, 0.31% from other races, and 0.87% from two or more races. Hispanic or Latino of any race were 0.62% of the population.

There were 853 households, out of which 17.1% had children under the age of 18 living with them, 73.9% were married couples living together, 3.5% had a female householder with no husband present, and 19.1% were non-families. 16.6% of all households were made up of individuals, and 8.0% had someone living alone who was 65 years of age or older. The average household size was 2.28 and the average family size was 2.51.

In the township the population was spread out, with 16.1% under the age of 18, 5.1% from 18 to 24, 15.6% from 25 to 44, 37.5% from 45 to 64, and 25.7% who were 65 years of age or older. The median age was 55 years. For every 100 females, there were 107.6 males. For every 100 females age 18 and over, there were 103.0 males.

The median income for a household in the township was $36,510, and the median income for a family was $40,625. Males had a median income of $41,042 versus $25,938 for females. The per capita income for the township was $21,332. About 4.6% of families and 7.4% of the population were below the poverty line, including 10.4% of those under age 18 and 1.9% of those age 65 or over.
