= Billings Township, Michigan =

- Civil township
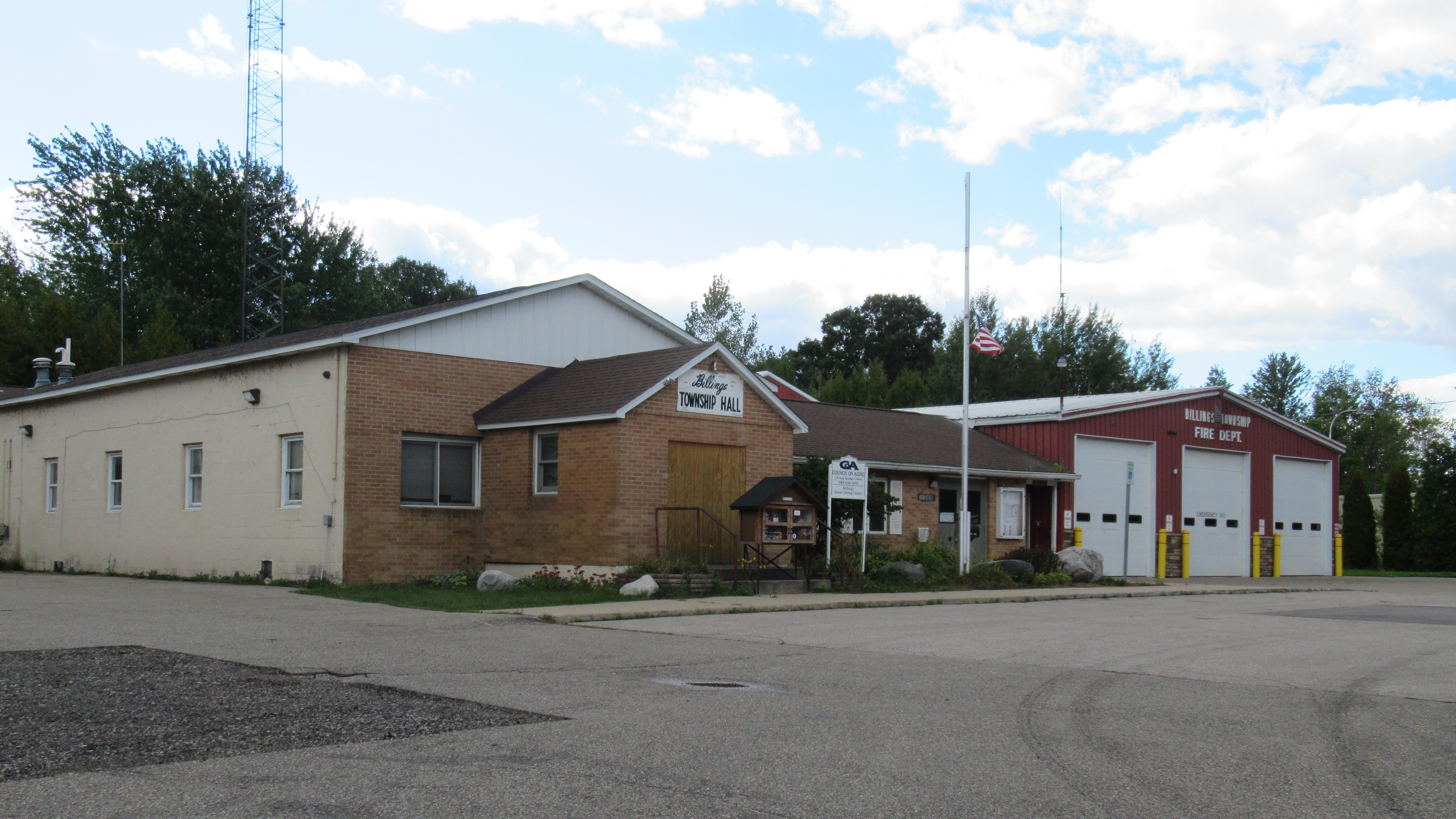
- Billings Township Hall and Fire Department

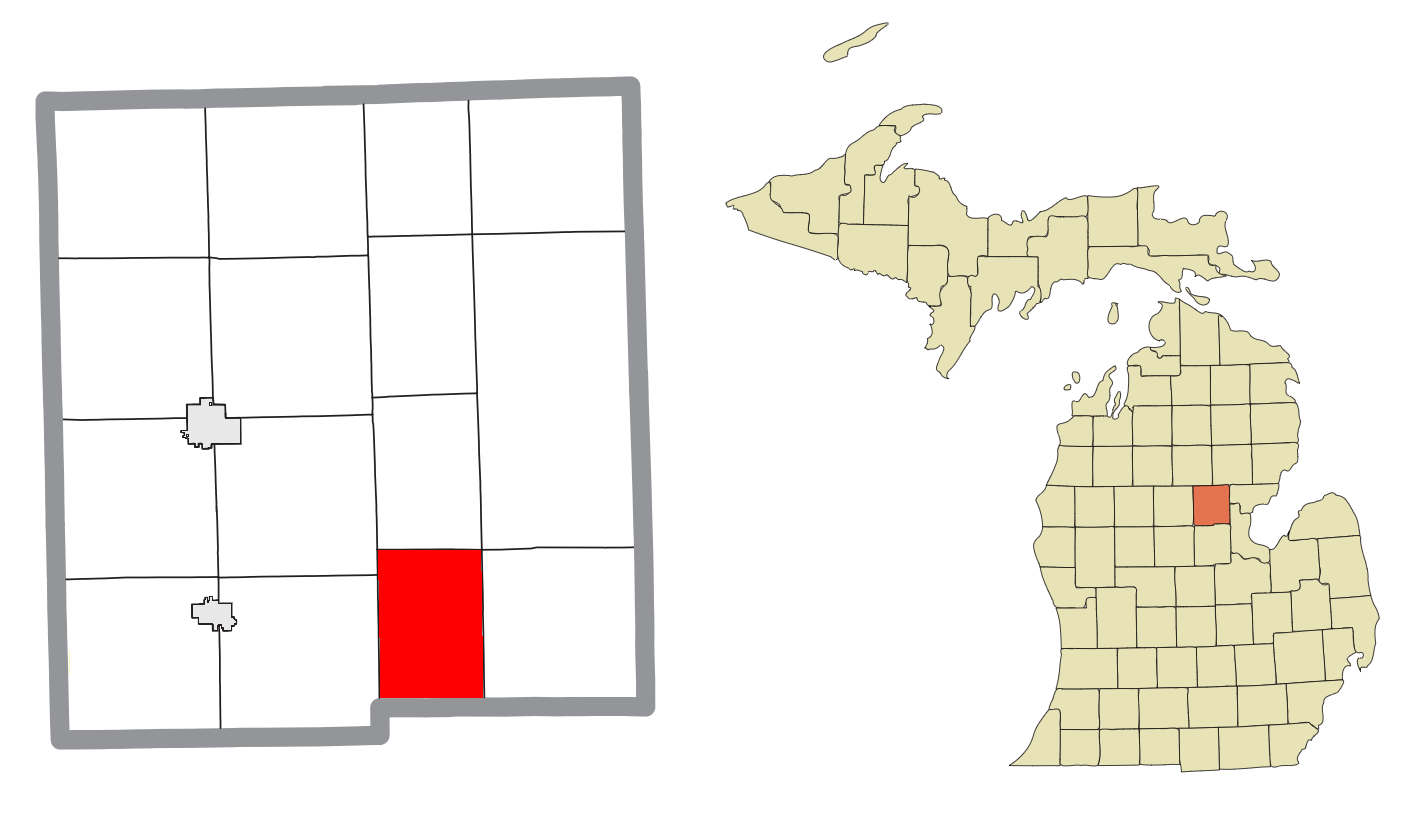
- Location within Gladwin County

- Location within the state of Michigan Location within the United States
- Coordinates: 43°52′18″N 84°19′26″W
- Country: United States
- State: Michigan
- County: Gladwin

Government
  - Supervisor: Tim Mester
  - Clerk: Linda McSweyn

Area
  - Total: 23.19 sq mi (60.06 km^{2})
  - Land: 21.56 sq mi (55.84 km^{2})
  - Water: 1.63 sq mi (4.22 km^{2})
- Elevation: 690 ft (210 m)

Population (2020)
  - Total: 2,318
  - Density: 107.5/sq mi (41.51/km^{2})
- Time zone: UTC-5 (Eastern (EST))
  - Summer (DST): UTC-4 (EDT)
- ZIP code(s): 48612 (Beaverton); 48628 (Hope); 48652 (Rhodes)
- Area code: 989
- FIPS code: 26-08360
- GNIS feature ID: 1625936
- Website: Official website

Billings Township is a civil township of Gladwin County in the U.S. state of Michigan. As of the 2020 census, the township population was 2,318.

== Communities ==
- Albright Shores (also spelled All Bright Shores) is an unincorporated community in the township situated at a bridge across the Tittabawassee River at 43°52′18″N 84°19′36″W.
- Billings is an unincorporated community in the township at 43°50′59″N 84°20′50″W. It was settled in 1875.
- Lockwood Beach is an unincorporated community in the township on the west bank of the Tittabawassee River at 43°50′34″N 84°20′08″W.

== Geography ==
According to the U.S. Census Bureau, the township has a total area of 23.19 square miles (60.06 km^{2}), of which 21.56 square miles (55.84 km^{2}) is land and 1.63 square miles (4.22 km^{2}) (7.01%) is water.

The Tittabawassee River flows south directly through the center of the township, and Wixom Lake occupied the southwestern corner of the township until the Edenville Dam failed in May 2020 and drained the reservoir.

=== Major highways ===
- M-30 runs south–north and forms most of the western boundary of the township.

== Demographics ==
As of the census of 2000, there were 2,715 people, 1,172 households, and 791 families residing in the township. The population density was 125.0 inhabitants per square mile (48.3/km^{2}). There were 2,148 housing units at an average density of 98.9 per square mile (38.2/km^{2}). The racial makeup of the township was 97.02% White, 0.11% African American, 0.74% Native American, 0.07% Asian, 0.52% from other races, and 1.55% from two or more races. Hispanic or Latino of any race were 1.47% of the population.

There were 1,172 households, out of which 24.4% had children under the age of 18 living with them, 54.1% were married couples living together, 9.2% had a female householder with no husband present, and 32.5% were non-families. 26.2% of all households were made up of individuals, and 10.1% had someone living alone who was 65 years of age or older. The average household size was 2.31 and the average family size was 2.76.

In the township the population was spread out, with 21.1% under the age of 18, 6.2% from 18 to 24, 23.5% from 25 to 44, 31.3% from 45 to 64, and 17.8% who were 65 years of age or older. The median age was 44 years. For every 100 females, there were 99.5 males. For every 100 females age 18 and over, there were 100.0 males.

The median income for a household in the township was $31,677, and the median income for a family was $37,292. Males had a median income of $35,817 versus $26,458 for females. The per capita income for the township was $17,999. About 10.5% of families and 12.4% of the population were below the poverty line, including 18.3% of those under age 18 and 8.0% of those age 65 or over.
