= Bentley Township, Michigan =

- Civil township
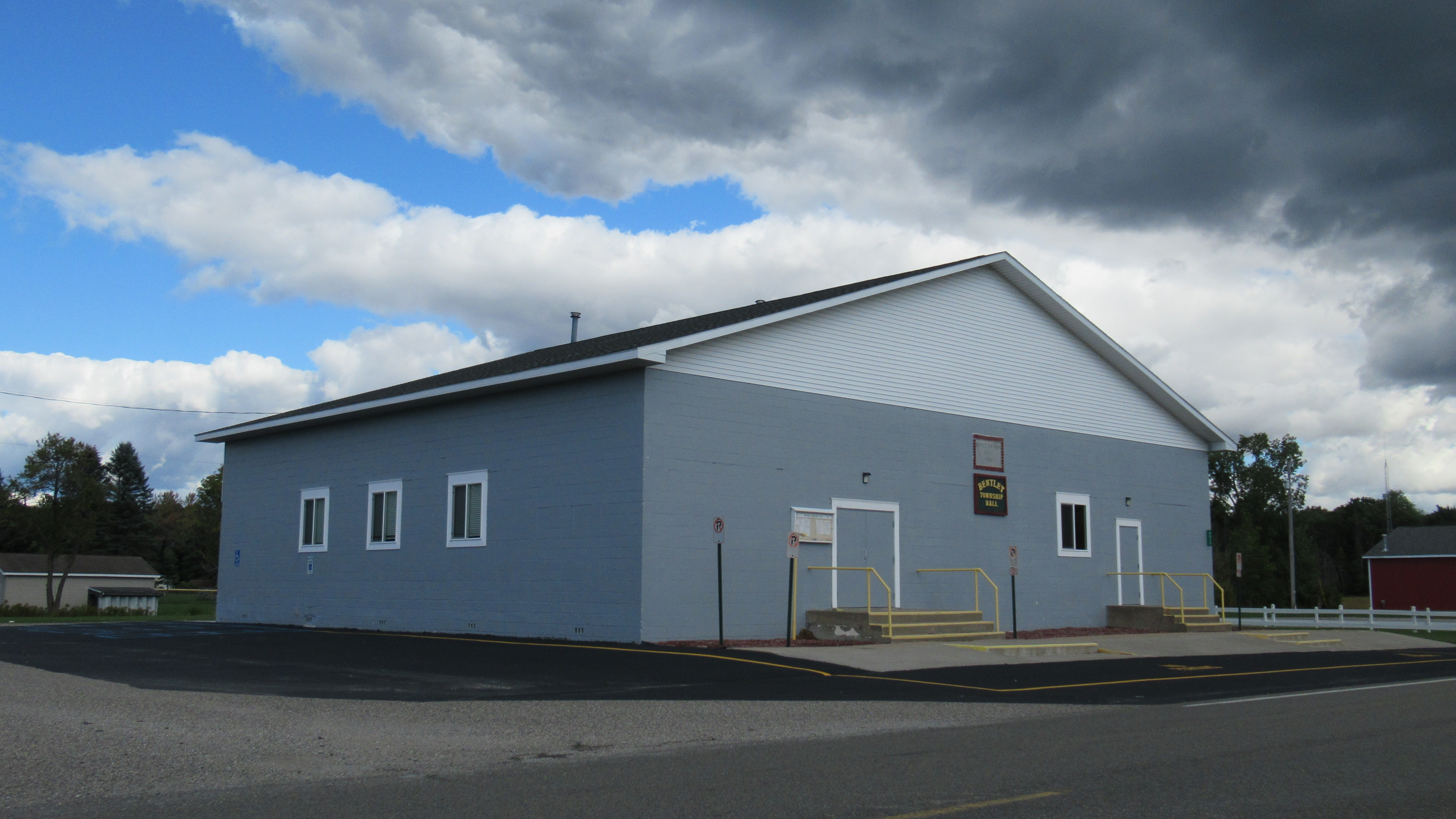
- Bentley Township Hall

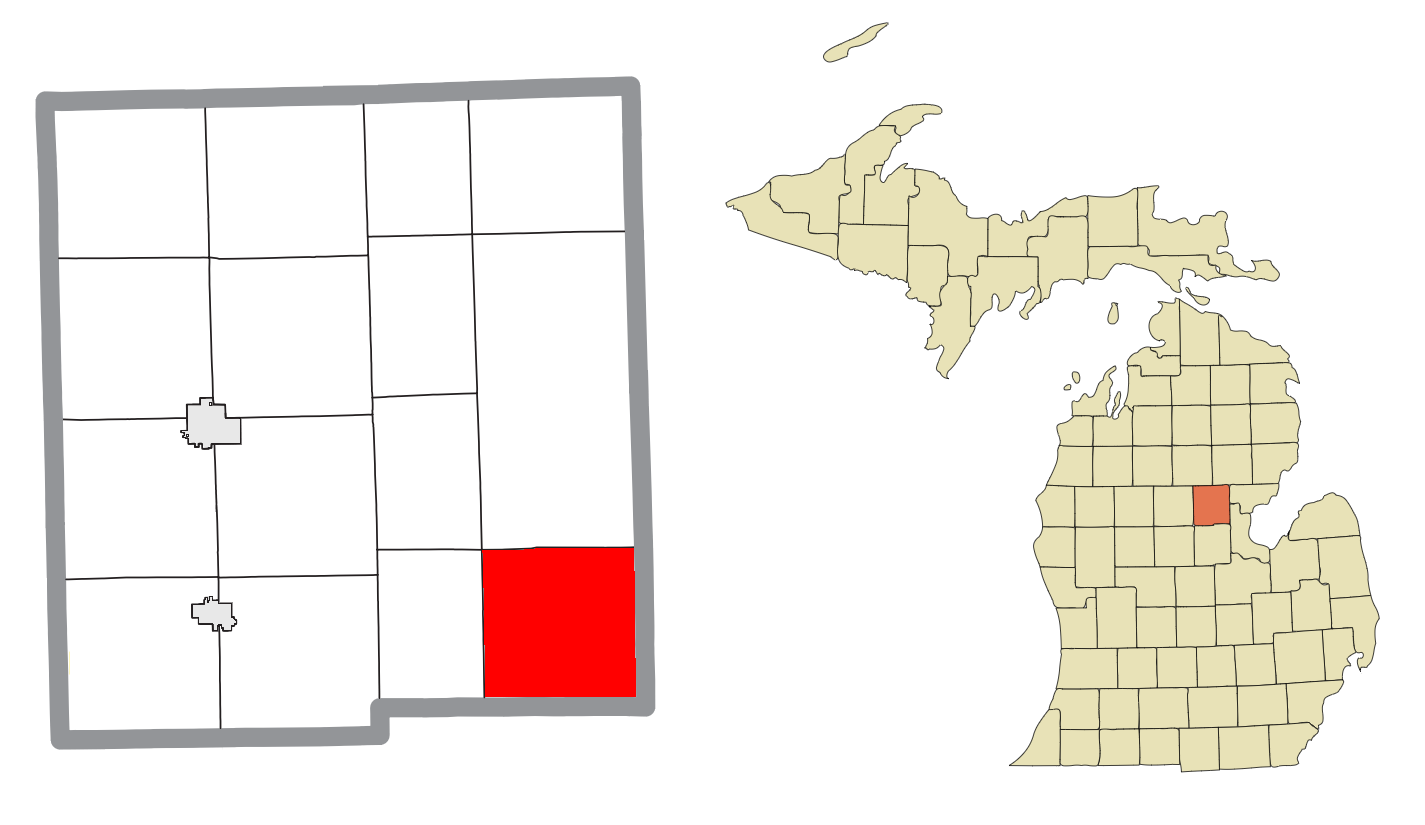
- Location within Gladwin County

- Location within the state of Michigan Location within the United States
- Coordinates: 43°51′45″N 84°11′47″W
- Country: United States
- State: Michigan
- County: Gladwin
- Established: 1948

Government
  - Supervisor: Bradley Neumeyer
  - Clerk: Kristie Resmer

Area
  - Total: 35.80 sq mi (92.72 km^{2})
  - Land: 35.70 sq mi (92.46 km^{2})
  - Water: 0.10 sq mi (0.26 km^{2})
- Elevation: 732 ft (223 m)

Population (2020)
  - Total: 829
  - Density: 23.2/sq mi (8.97/km^{2})
- Time zone: UTC-5 (Eastern (EST))
  - Summer (DST): UTC-4 (EDT)
- ZIP code(s): 48613 (Bentley); 48628 (Hope); 48652 (Rhodes)
- Area code: 989
- FIPS code: 26-07360
- GNIS feature ID: 1625915
- Website: https://bentleytownship.org/

Bentley Township is a civil township of Gladwin County in the U.S. state of Michigan. As of the 2020 census, the township population was 829.

== Communities ==
- Rhodes is an unincorporated community within the township at 43°54′06″N 84°10′34″W. The Rhodes 48652 ZIP Code serves the majority of the township. The community was settled by Murry Bently Rhodes, an early postmaster and businessman in the local lumber industry, who gave the community his last name.
- Estey is an unincorporated community within the township at 43°52′12″N 84°12′20″W. It was formed around a lumber mill in 1891. For a time, it was an incorporated village but was disincorporated in 1920.

== Geography ==
According to the U.S. Census Bureau, the township has a total area of 35.80 square miles (92.72 km^{2}), of which 35.70 square miles (92.46 km^{2}) is land and 0.10 square miles (0.26 km^{2}) (0.36%) is water.

== Demographics ==
As of the census of 2000, there were 859 people, 327 households, and 255 families residing in the township. The population density was 24.1 inhabitants per square mile (9.3/km^{2}). There were 361 housing units at an average density of 10.1 per square mile (3.9/km^{2}). The racial makeup of the township was 98.14% White, 0.47% Native American, 0.12% Pacific Islander, and 1.28% from two or more races. Hispanic or Latino of any race were 0.70% of the population.

There were 327 households, out of which 31.8% had children under the age of 18 living with them, 64.8% were married couples living together, 8.6% had a female householder with no husband present, and 22.0% were non-families. 18.0% of all households were made up of individuals, and 7.6% had someone living alone who was 65 years of age or older. The average household size was 2.60 and the average family size was 2.91.

In the township the population was spread out, with 24.7% under the age of 18, 7.3% from 18 to 24, 30.5% from 25 to 44, 22.5% from 45 to 64, and 15.0% who were 65 years of age or older. The median age was 37 years. For every 100 females, there were 97.5 males. For every 100 females age 18 and over, there were 97.9 males.

The median income for a household in the township was $37,125, and the median income for a family was $40,179. Males had a median income of $35,972 versus $23,750 for females. The per capita income for the township was $15,074. About 13.0% of families and 16.1% of the population were below the poverty line, including 22.1% of those under age 18 and 8.6% of those age 65 or over.

== Images ==
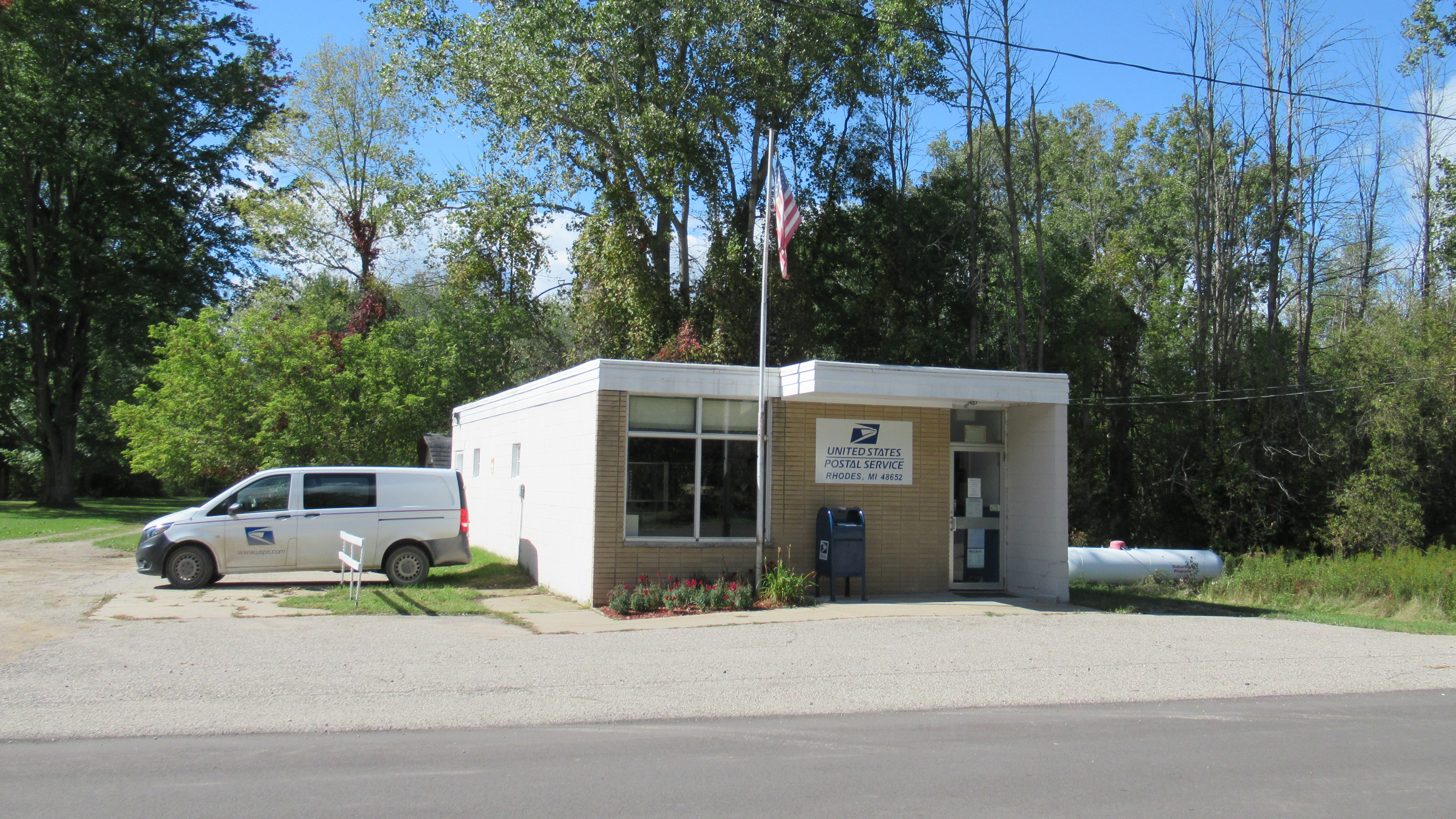
U.S. Post Office in Rhodes

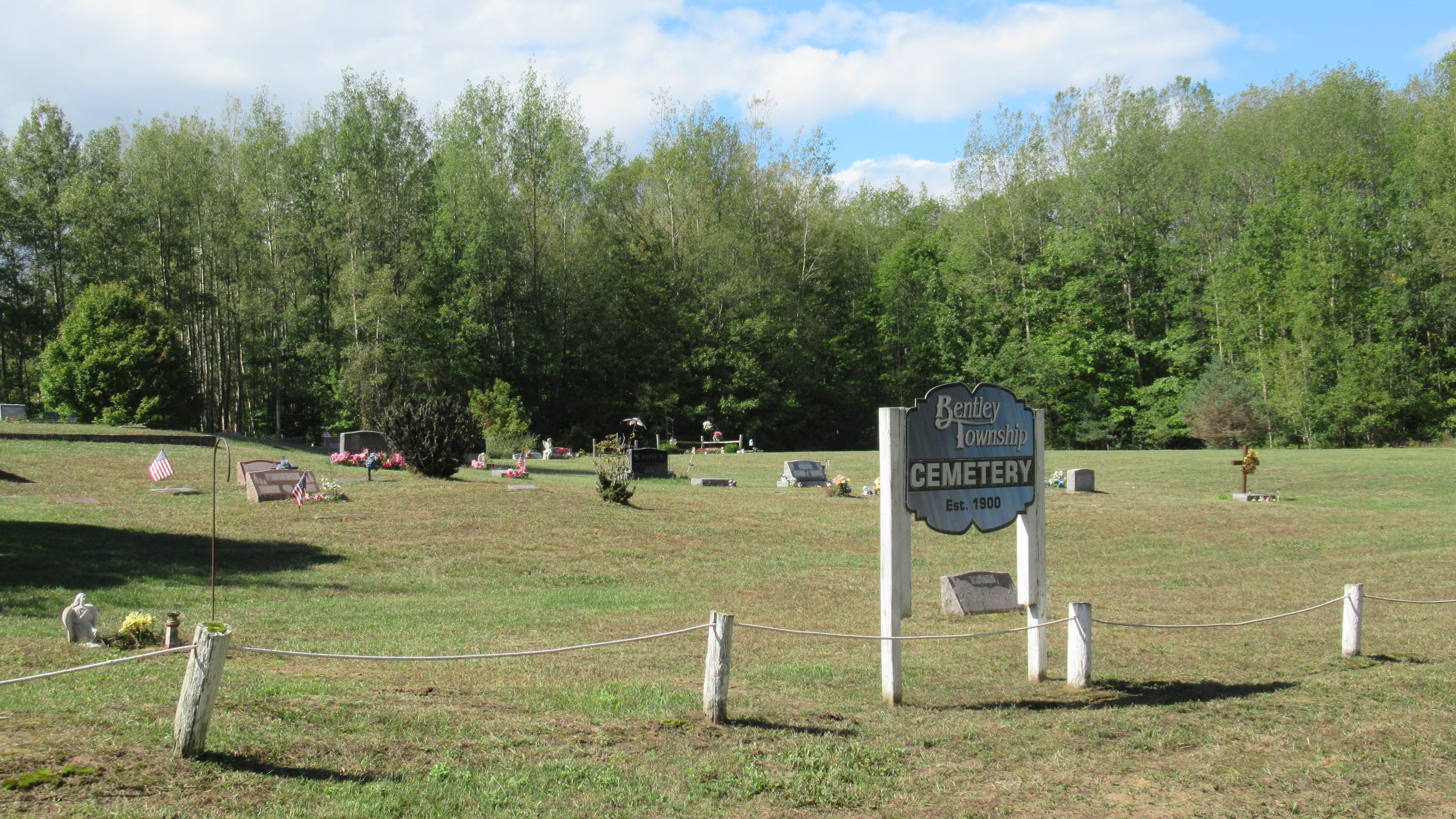
Bentley Township Cemetery
