= Franklin Township, Michigan =

Franklin Township may refer to:

- Franklin Township, Clare County, Michigan
- Franklin Township, Houghton County, Michigan
- Franklin Township, Lenawee County, Michigan

== See also ==
- Franklin, Michigan, a village in Oakland County
