= Grout Township, Michigan =

- Civil township
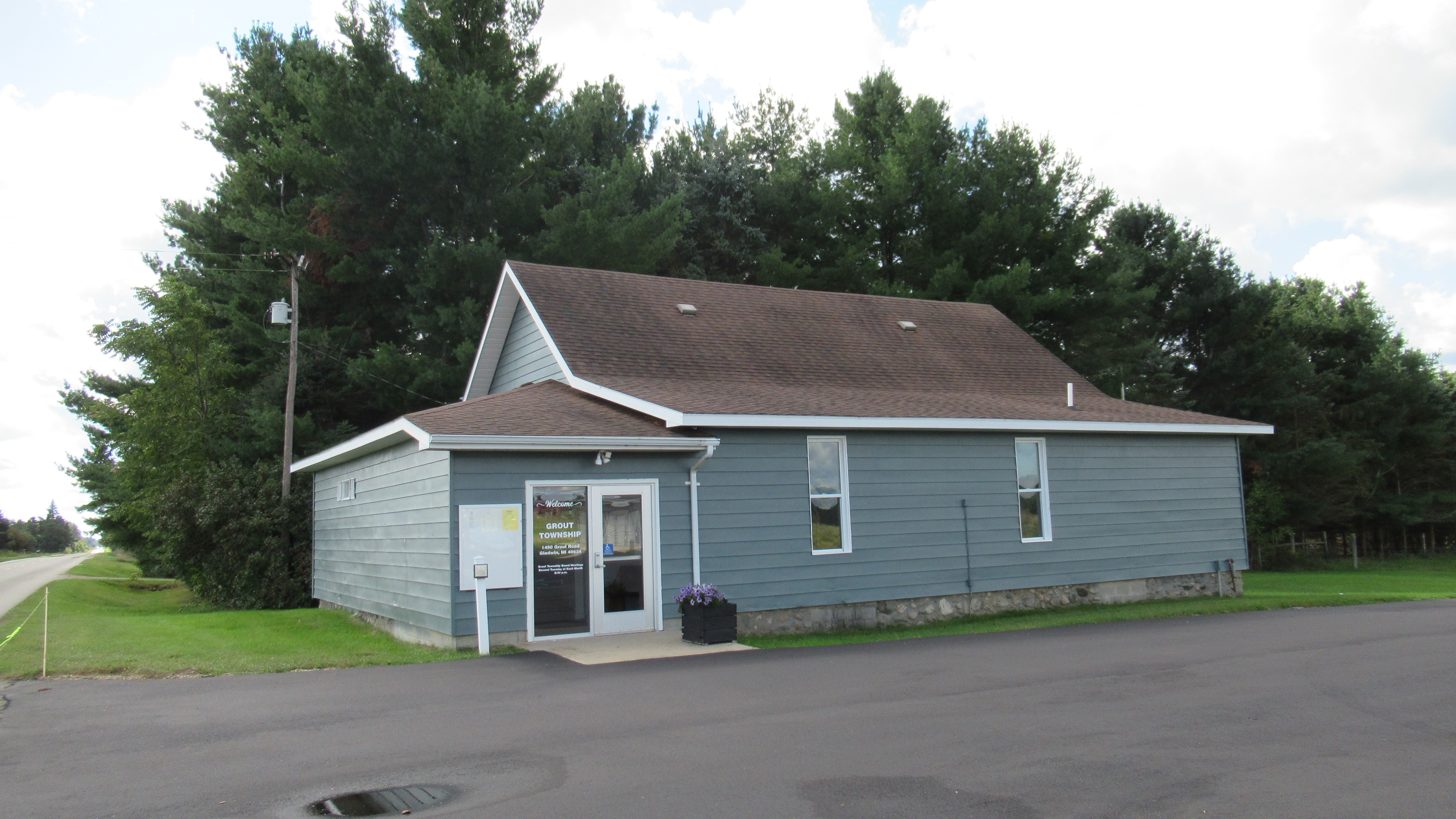
- Grout Township Hall

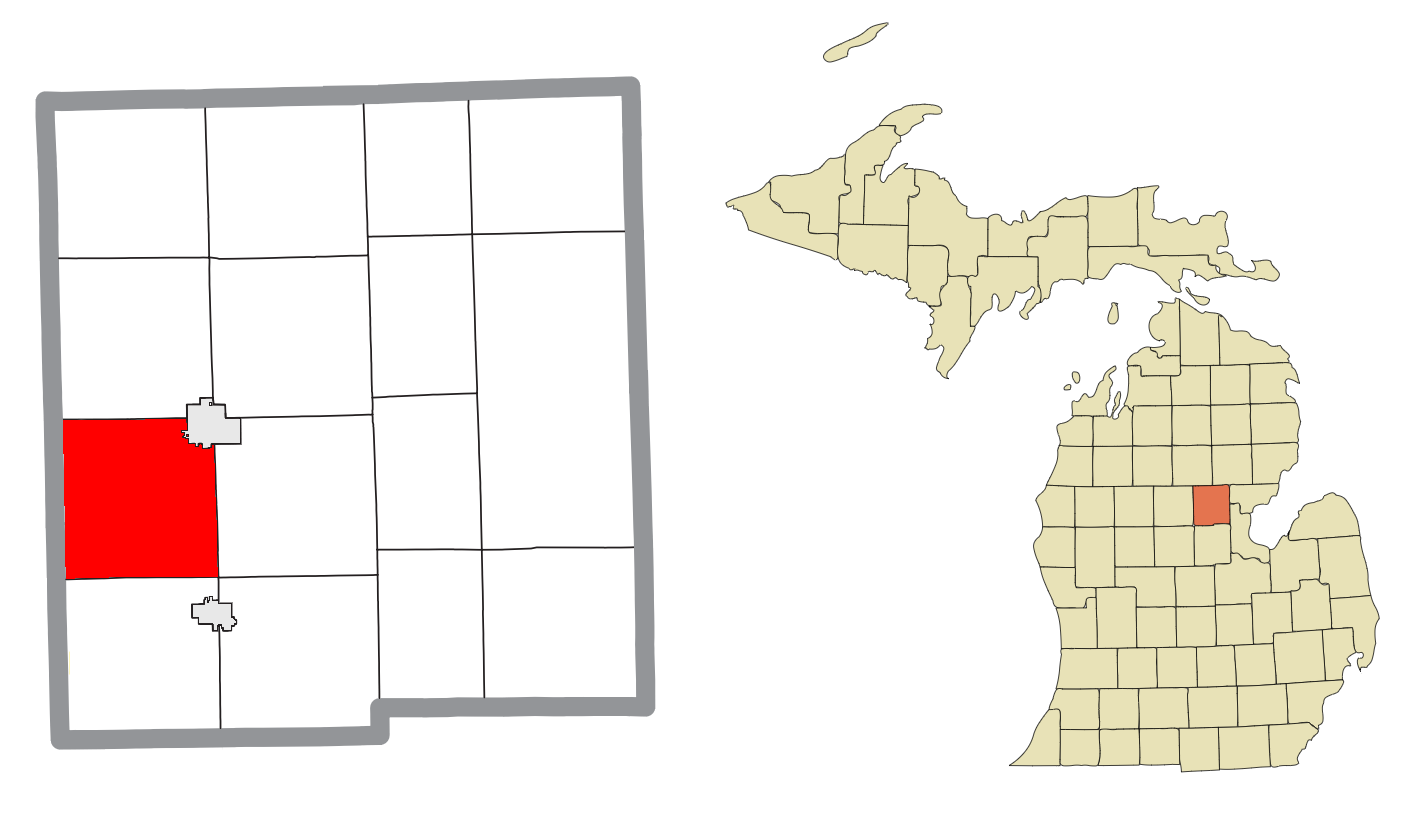
- Location within Gladwin County

- Location within the state of Michigan Location within the United States
- Coordinates: 43°56′39″N 84°33′24″W
- Country: United States
- State: Michigan
- County: Gladwin

Government
  - Supervisor: Jim Shea
  - Clerk: Diana Fritzler

Area
  - Total: 34.79 sq mi (90.11 km^{2})
  - Land: 34.18 sq mi (88.53 km^{2})
  - Water: 0.24 sq mi (0.61 km^{2})
- Elevation: 797 ft (243 m)

Population (2020)
  - Total: 1,974
  - Density: 57.75/sq mi (22.30/km^{2})
- Time zone: UTC-5 (Eastern (EST))
  - Summer (DST): UTC-4 (EDT)
- ZIP code(s): 48612 (Beaverton); 48624 (Gladwin)
- Area code: 989
- FIPS code: 26-35620
- GNIS feature ID: 1626413
- Website: https://grouttownship.org/

Grout Township is a civil township of Gladwin County in the U.S. state of Michigan. The population was 1,974 at the 2020 census.

== Geography ==
According to the U.S. Census Bureau, the township has a total area of 34.79 square miles (90.11 km^{2}), of which 34.18 square miles (88.53 km^{2}) is land and 0.61 square miles (1.58 km^{2}) (0.40%) is water.

=== Major highways ===
- M-18 runs south–north through the east portion of the township.
- M-61 forms a portion of the northern boundary of the township and runs west–east to the city of Gladwin.

== Demographics ==
As of the census of 2000, there were 1,869 people, 654 households, and 516 families residing in the township. The population density was 53.9 inhabitants per square mile (20.8/km^{2}). There were 754 housing units at an average density of 21.7 per square mile (8.4/km^{2}). The racial makeup of the township was 98.07% White, 0.86% Native American, 0.05% Asian, 0.05% from other races, and 0.96% from two or more races. Hispanic or Latino of any race were 0.91% of the population.

There were 654 households, out of which 32.9% had children under the age of 18 living with them, 67.7% were married couples living together, 6.9% had a female householder with no husband present, and 21.1% were non-families. 17.1% of all households were made up of individuals, and 8.4% had someone living alone who was 65 years of age or older. The average household size was 2.81 and the average family size was 3.14.

In the township the population was spread out, with 26.5% under the age of 18, 8.3% from 18 to 24, 27.1% from 25 to 44, 24.0% from 45 to 64, and 14.0% who were 65 years of age or older. The median age was 38 years. For every 100 females, there were 101.0 males. For every 100 females age 18 and over, there were 97.0 males.

The median income for a household in the township was $34,808, and the median income for a family was $37,500. Males had a median income of $30,848 versus $21,146 for females. The per capita income for the township was $15,438. About 7.3% of families and 12.3% of the population were below the poverty line, including 18.1% of those under age 18 and 9.0% of those age 65 or over.
