= Hamilton Township, Clare County, Michigan =

Hamilton Township, Michigan
- Civil township
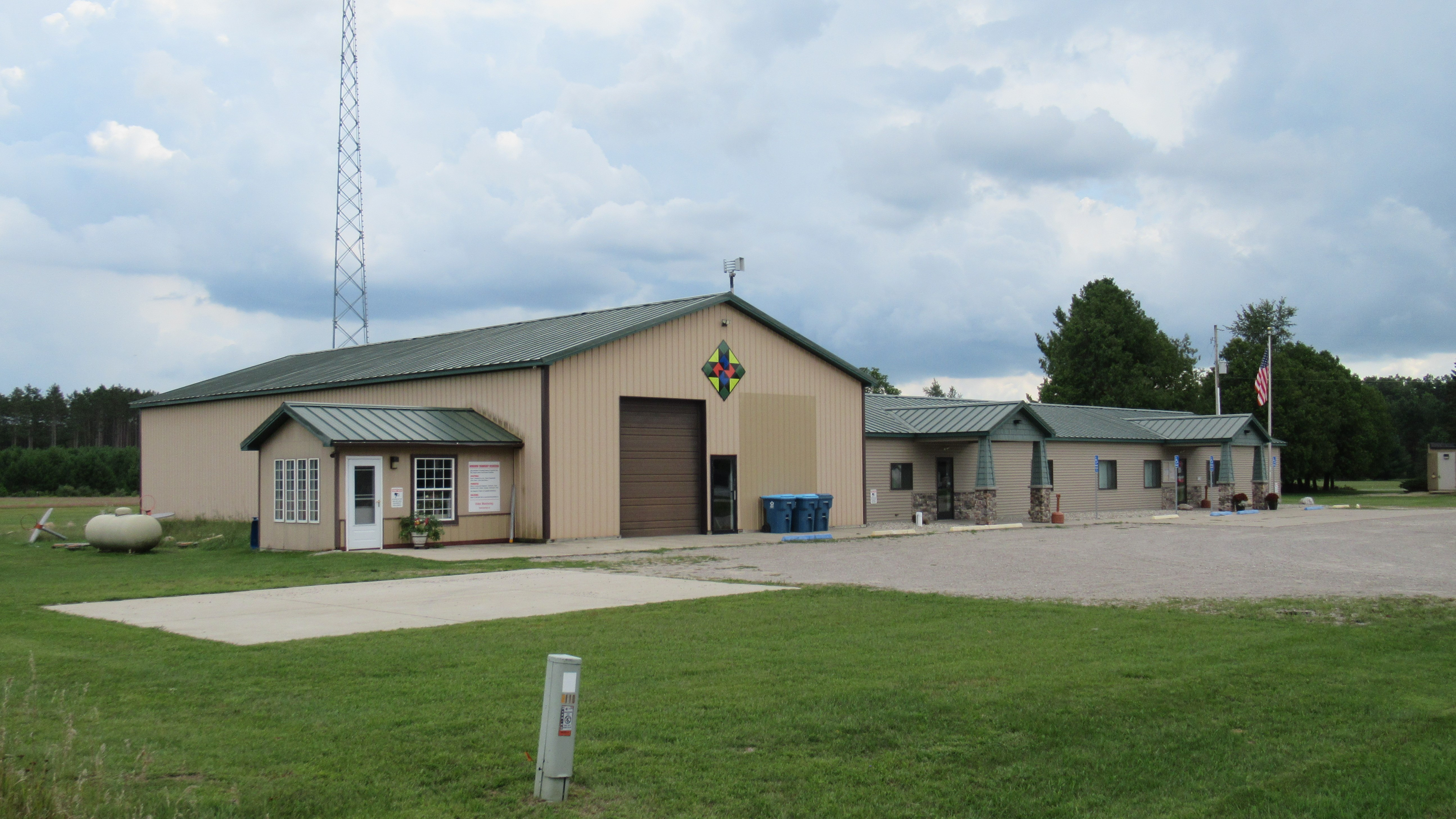
- Hamilton Township Hall

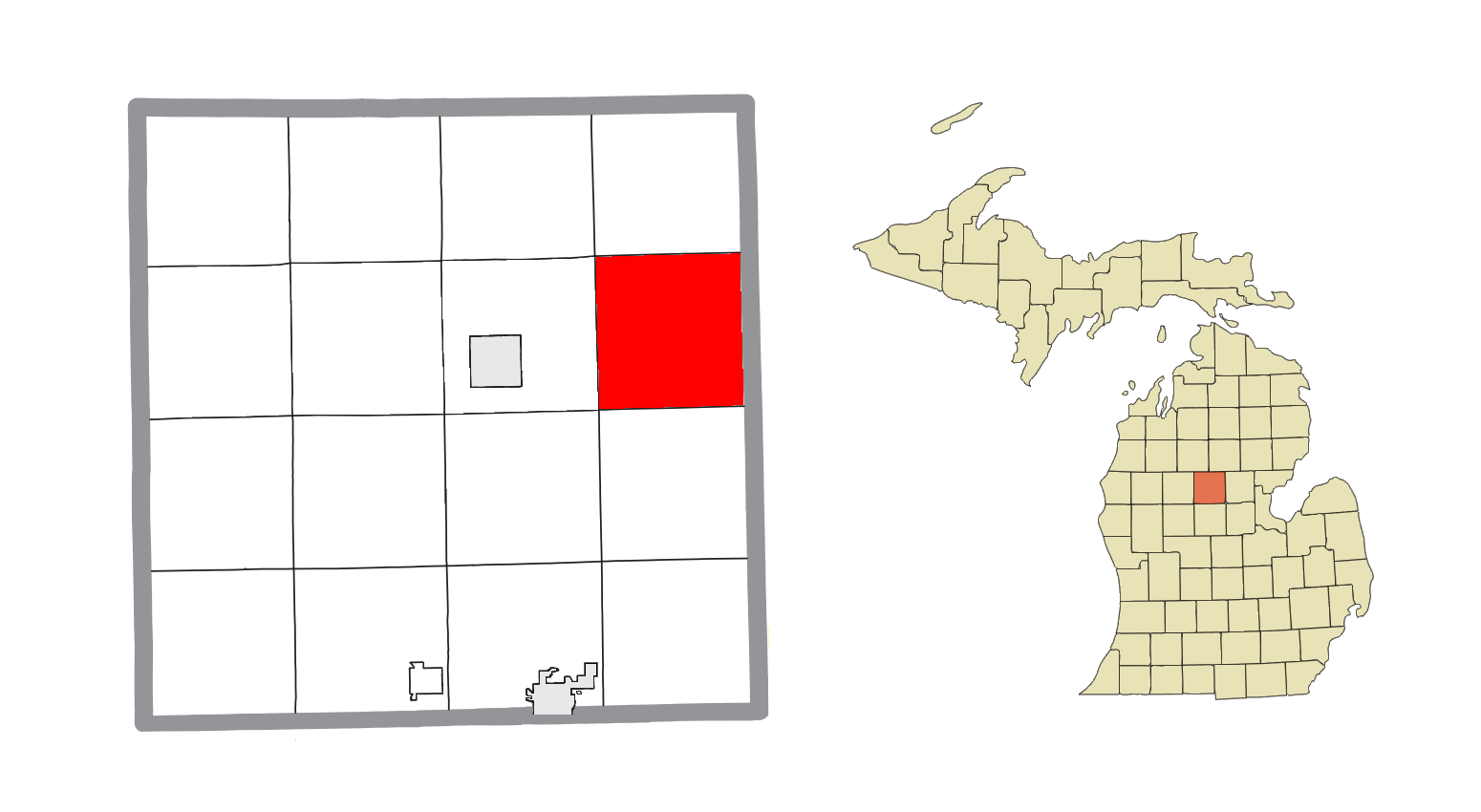
- Location within Clare County

- Location within the state of Michigan Location within the United States
- Coordinates: 44°02′13″N 84°41′12″W
- Country: United States
- State: Michigan
- County: Clare
- Established: 1885

Government
  - Supervisor: David Wright
  - Clerk: Valdine Erskine

Area
  - Total: 36.36 sq mi (94.17 km^{2})
  - Land: 35.87 sq mi (92.90 km^{2})
  - Water: 0.49 sq mi (1.27 km^{2})
- Elevation: 906 ft (276 m)

Population (2020)
  - Total: 1,785
  - Density: 49.76/sq mi (19.21/km^{2})
- Time zone: UTC-5 (Eastern (EST))
  - Summer (DST): UTC-4 (EDT)
- ZIP code(s): 48624 (Gladwin); 48625 (Harrison)
- Area code: 989
- FIPS code: 26-36140
- GNIS feature ID: 1626421
- Website: Official website

Hamilton Township is a civil township of Clare County in the U.S. state of Michigan. The population was 1,785 at the 2020 census.

== History ==
The township was organized from the eastern portion of Hayes Township in 1885. The creation of the township was spearheaded by Hayes Township chairman W. W. Weatherwax, who hoped to have the new township named after him. However, the vote on the new township gave it the name Hamilton.

== Geography ==
According to the U.S. Census Bureau, the township has a total area of 36.36 square miles (94.17 km^{2}), of which 35.87 square miles (92.90 km^{2}) is land and 0.49 square miles (1.27 km^{2}) (1.35%) is water.

=== Major highways ===
- M-61 (East Gladwin Road) forms the entire southern border of the township.

== Demographics ==
As of the census of 2000, there were 1,988 people, 812 households, and 586 families residing in the township. The population density was 55.3 inhabitants per square mile (21.4/km^{2}). There were 1,650 housing units at an average density of 45.9 per square mile (17.7/km^{2}). The racial makeup of the township was 97.23% White, 0.15% African American, 0.91% Native American, 0.10% Asian, 0.45% from other races, and 1.16% from two or more races. Hispanic or Latino of any race were 1.11% of the population.

There were 812 households, out of which 26.5% had children under the age of 18 living with them, 60.1% were married couples living together, 8.0% had a female householder with no husband present, and 27.8% were non-families. 24.4% of all households were made up of individuals, and 10.1% had someone living alone who was 65 years of age or older. The average household size was 2.44 and the average family size was 2.86.

In the township the population was spread out, with 24.5% under the age of 18, 5.3% from 18 to 24, 23.4% from 25 to 44, 28.6% from 45 to 64, and 18.2% who were 65 years of age or older. The median age was 43 years. For every 100 females, there were 102.7 males. For every 100 females age 18 and over, there were 101.2 males.

The median income for a household in the township was $26,221, and the median income for a family was $30,000. Males had a median income of $31,397 versus $18,068 for females. The per capita income for the township was $13,433. About 17.9% of families and 23.3% of the population were below the poverty line, including 33.2% of those under age 18 and 13.0% of those age 65 or over.

== Education ==
The township is served by two separate public school districts. The majority of the township is served by Harrison Community Schools to the west in Harrison. The eastern portion of the township is served by Gladwin Community Schools to the east in Gladwin County.
