= Gladwin Township, Michigan =

- Civil township
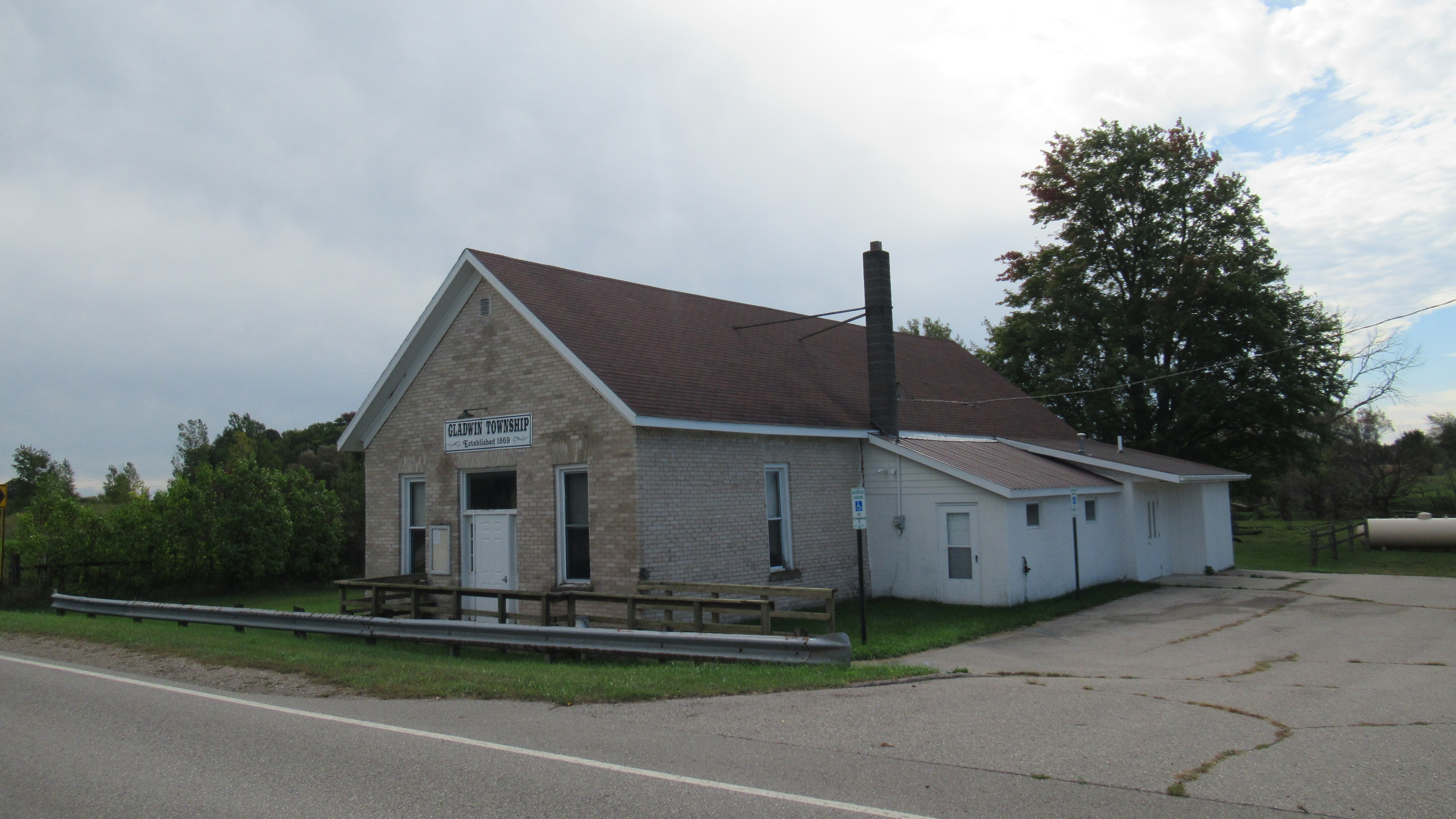
- Gladwin Township Hall

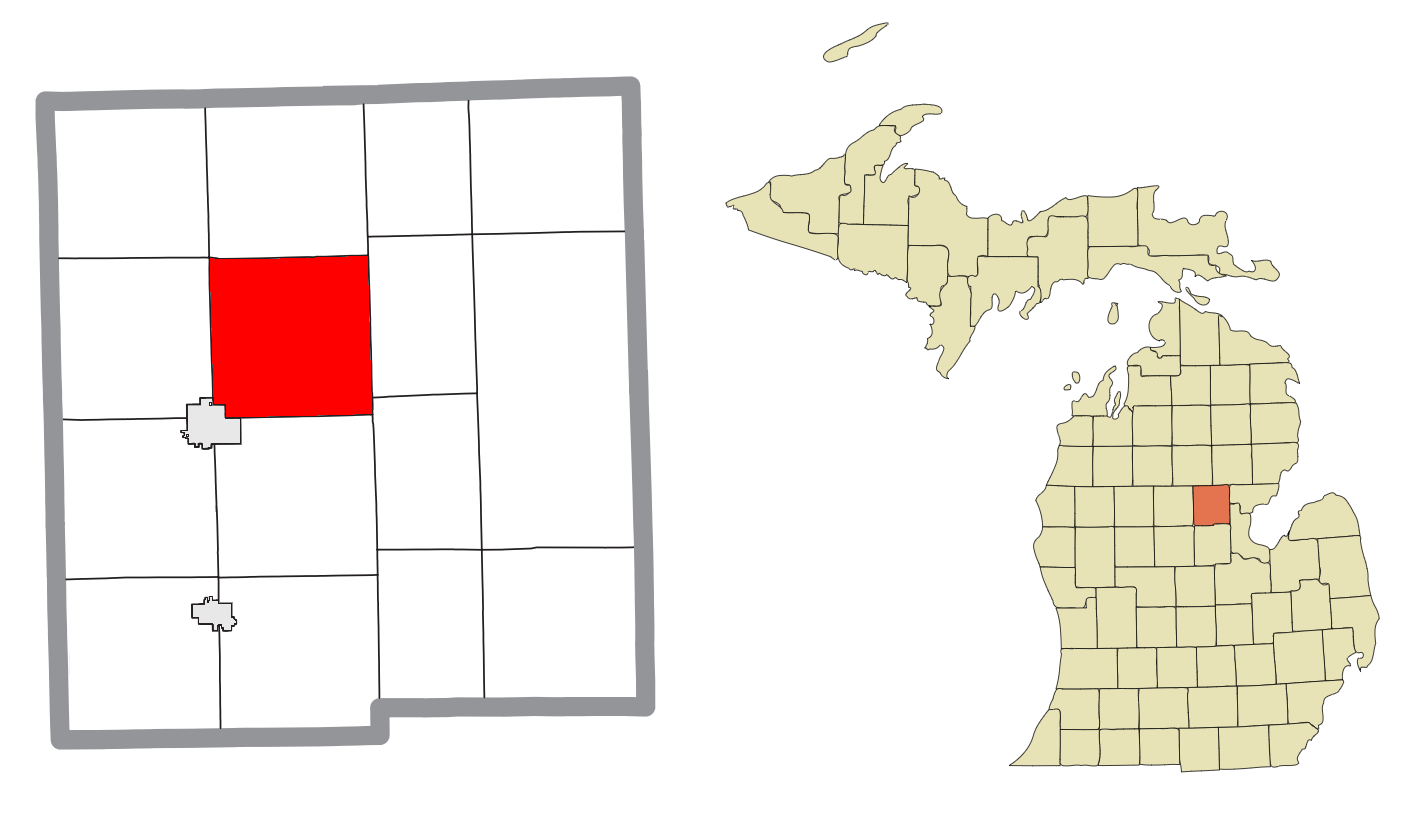
- Location within Gladwin County

- Location within the state of Michigan Location within the United States
- Coordinates: 44°1′34″N 84°25′3″W
- Country: United States
- State: Michigan
- County: Gladwin
- Established: 1869

Government
  - Supervisor: Robert Weaver
  - Clerk: Kristie Simrau

Area
  - Total: 35.29 sq mi (91.4 km^{2})
  - Land: 35.22 sq mi (91.2 km^{2})
  - Water: 0.07 sq mi (0.18 km^{2})
- Elevation: 791 ft (241 m)

Population (2020)
  - Total: 1,118
  - Density: 31.74/sq mi (12.26/km^{2})
- Time zone: UTC-5 (Eastern (EST))
  - Summer (DST): UTC-4 (EDT)
- ZIP code(s): 48624 (Gladwin)
- Area code: 989
- FIPS code: 26-32340
- GNIS feature ID: 1626358
- Website: https://gladwintownship.org/

Gladwin Township is a civil township of Gladwin County in the U.S. state of Michigan. The population was 1,118 at the 2020 census.

The city of Gladwin borders at the southwest corner of the township, but the two are administered autonomously.

== Geography ==
According to the U.S. Census Bureau, the township has a total area of 35.29 square miles (91.40 km^{2}), of which 35.22 square miles (91.22 km^{2}) is land and 0.07 square miles (0.18 km^{2}) (0.20%) is water.

== Demographics ==
As of the census of 2000, there were 1,044 people, 345 households, and 272 families residing in the township. The population density was 29.6 inhabitants per square mile (11.4/km^{2}). There were 419 housing units at an average density of 11.9 per square mile (4.6/km^{2}). The racial makeup of the township was 99.14% White, 0.38% African American, and 0.48% from two or more races. Hispanic or Latino of any race were 0.10% of the population.

There were 345 households, out of which 38.3% had children under the age of 18 living with them, 69.9% were married couples living together, 5.8% had a female householder with no husband present, and 20.9% were non-families. 18.8% of all households were made up of individuals, and 9.6% had someone living alone who was 65 years of age or older. The average household size was 3.01 and the average family size was 3.42.

In the township the population was spread out, with 33.3% under the age of 18, 7.6% from 18 to 24, 23.9% from 25 to 44, 22.7% from 45 to 64, and 12.5% who were 65 years of age or older. The median age was 34 years. For every 100 females, there were 99.6 males. For every 100 females age 18 and over, there were 99.4 males.

The median income for a household in the township was $35,441, and the median income for a family was $37,045. Males had a median income of $27,639 versus $19,167 for females. The per capita income for the township was $14,659. About 18.1% of families and 26.1% of the population were below the poverty line, including 40.2% of those under age 18 and 3.5% of those age 65 or over.
