= Secord Township, Michigan =

- Civil township
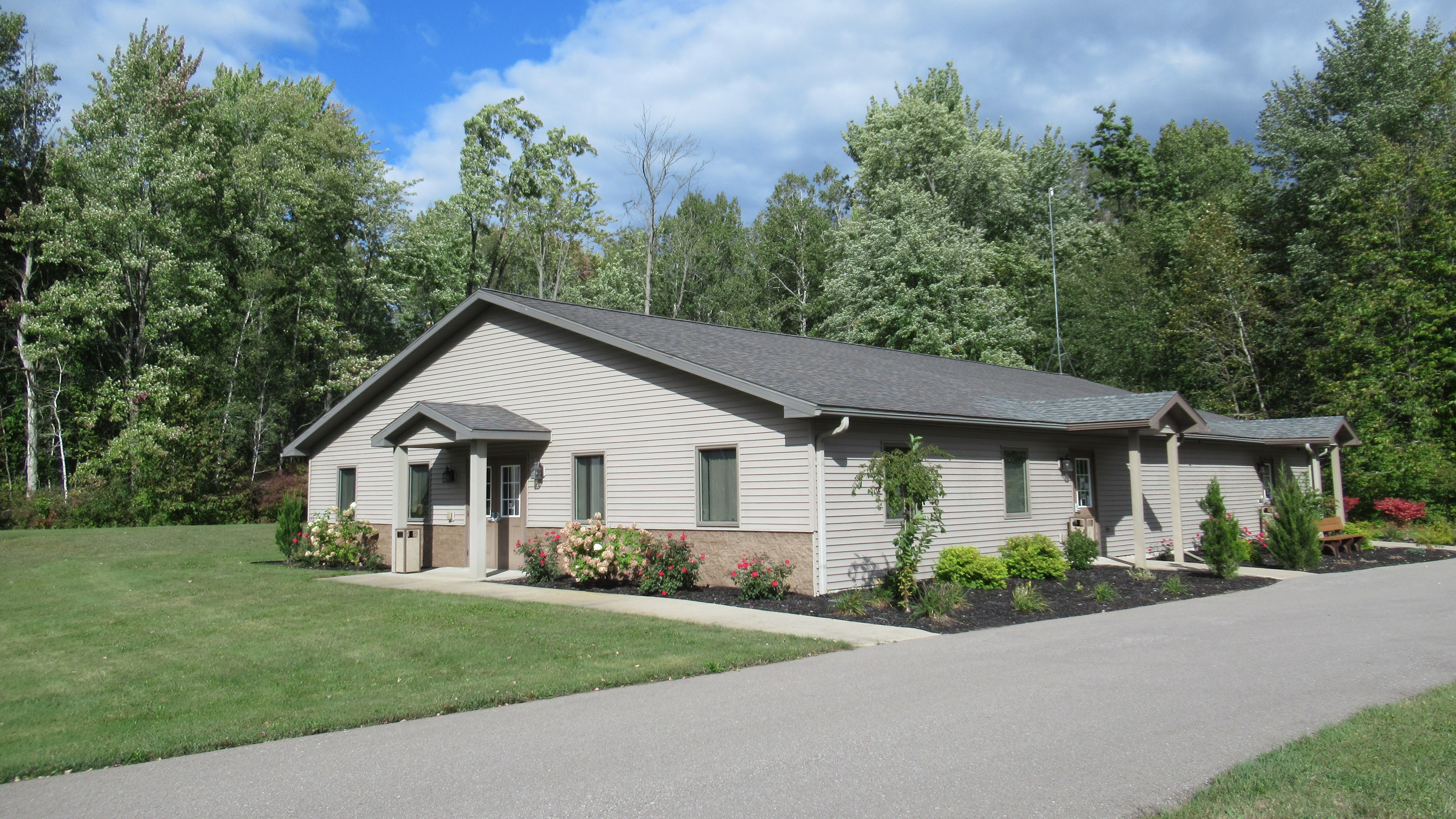
- Secord Township Hall

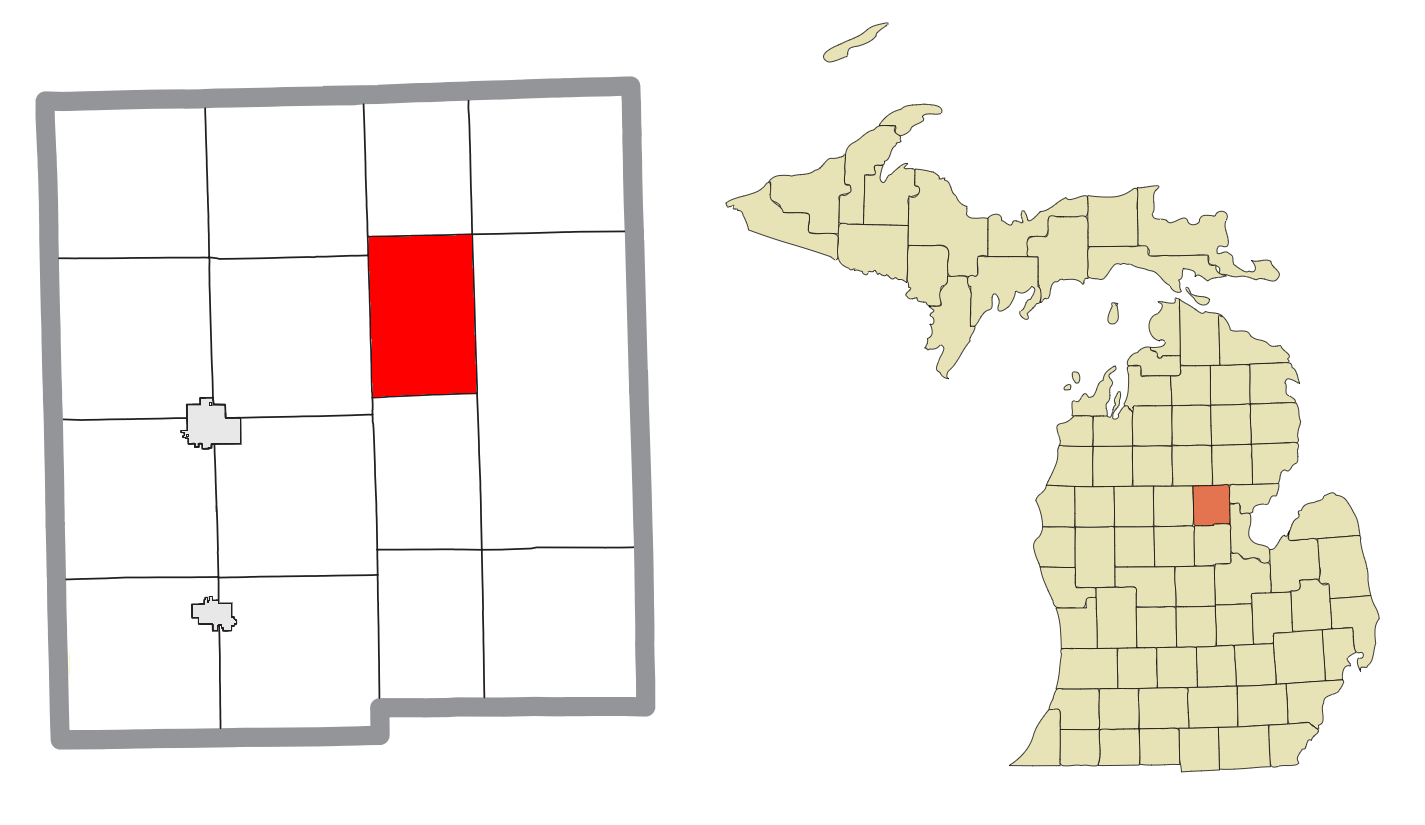
- Location within Gladwin County

- Location within the state of Michigan Location within the United States
- Coordinates: 44°02′34″N 84°20′17″W
- Country: United States
- State: Michigan
- County: Gladwin
- Established: 1912

Government
  - Supervisor: Joel Vernier
  - Clerk: Karen Gawron

Area
  - Total: 23.51 sq mi (60.89 km^{2})
  - Land: 22.03 sq mi (57.06 km^{2})
  - Water: 1.48 sq mi (3.83 km^{2})
- Elevation: 745 ft (227 m)

Population (2020)
  - Total: 1,046
  - Density: 47.48/sq mi (18.33/km^{2})
- Time zone: UTC-5 (Eastern (EST))
  - Summer (DST): UTC-4 (EDT)
- ZIP code(s): 48624 (Gladwin)
- Area code: 989
- FIPS code: 26-72240
- GNIS feature ID: 1627056
- Website: Official website

Secord Township is a civil township of Gladwin County in the U.S. state of Michigan. The population was 1,046 at the 2020 census.

== Communities ==
- Secord is an unincorporated community located at 44°00′54″N 84°20′52″W in the southwest portion of the township.

== History ==
Secord Township, along with many other townships in the Tri County area, was originally inhabited by Native Americans prior to the arrival of Europeans. The Chippewa tribe was most present at this time. A Canadian man named Marcel Secord first arrived to the area in 1861 with his family while canoeing down the Tittabawassee River. In the Summer of 1864, he built a login cabin roughly 10 miles (16.1 km) east of Gladwin. Secord was a skilled trapper and hunter, providing meals to early lumberjacks in the area. The area would later be known as "Secord" when a post office was established in 1912 when Secord Township was officially organized. The township is named for Marvel Secord, an early settler.

== Geography ==
According to the U.S. Census Bureau, the township has a total area of 23.51 square miles (60.89 km^{2}), of which 22.03 square miles (57.06 km^{2}) is land and 1.48 square miles (3.83 km^{2}) (6.30%) is water.

The Tittabawassee River flows south through the center of the township. The river is dammed by the Secord Dam.

=== Major highways ===
- M-30 runs north–south and forms most of the western boundary of the township.

== Demographics ==
At the 2000 census, there were 1,140 people, 551 households and 382 families residing in the township. The population density was 50.7 inhabitants per square mile (19.6/km^{2}). There were 1,373 housing units at an average density of 61.1 per square mile (23.6/km^{2}). The racial makeup of the township was 99.21% White, 0.09% African American, 0.18% Native American, 0.26% Asian, 0.09% from other races, and 0.18% from two or more races. Hispanic or Latino of any race were 0.61% of the population.

There were 551 households, of which 12.9% had children under the age of 18 living with them, 61.5% were married couples living together, 5.4% had a female householder with no husband present, and 30.5% were non-families. 27.6% of all households were made up of individuals, and 12.0% had someone living alone who was 65 years of age or older. The average household size was 2.05 and the average family size was 2.41.

Age distribution was 12.8% under the age of 18, 3.6% from 18 to 24, 16.6% from 25 to 44, 38.1% from 45 to 64, and 28.9% who were 65 years of age or older. The median age was 56 years. For every 100 females, there were 96.2 males. For every 100 females age 18 and over, there were 95.3 males.

The median household income was $30,500, and the median family income for a family was $34,453. Males had a median income of $34,107 versus $23,750 for females. The per capita income for the township was $18,542. About 12.1% of families and 16.1% of the population were below the poverty line, including 28.8% of those under age 18 and 9.6% of those age 65 or over.

== Images ==
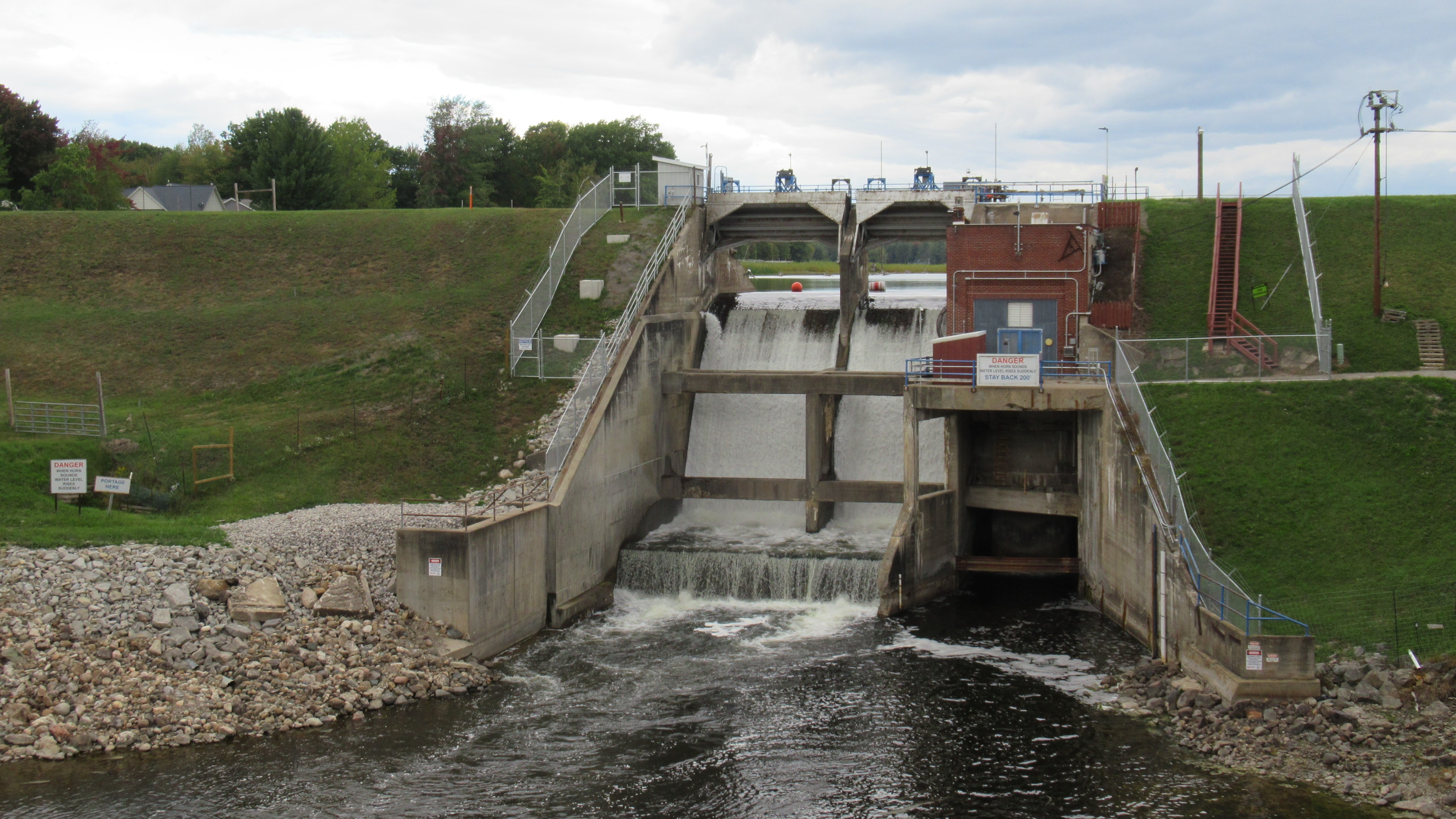
Secord Dam

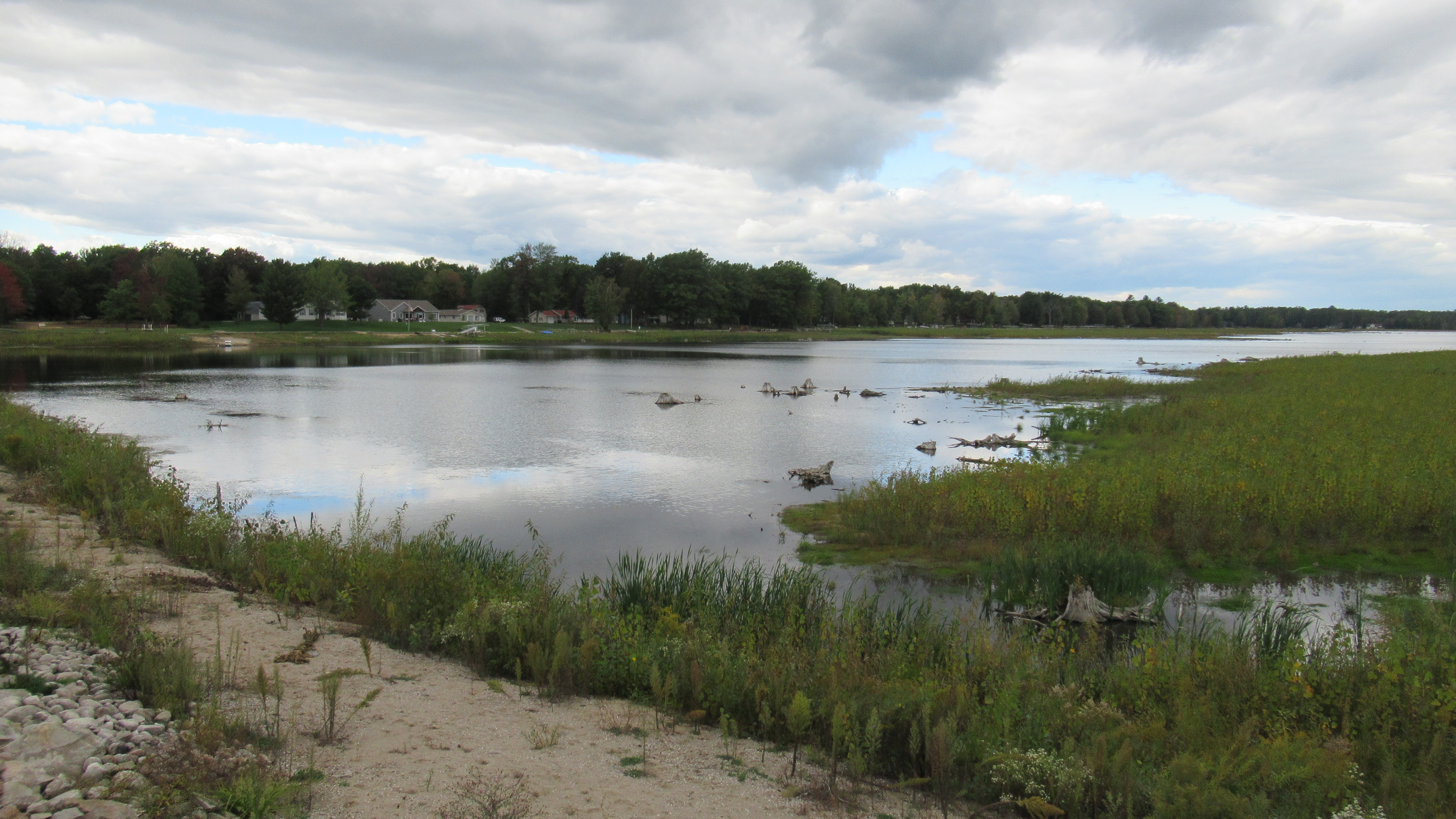
Secord Lake
