= Gladwin County, Michigan =

County in Michigan, United States

- County
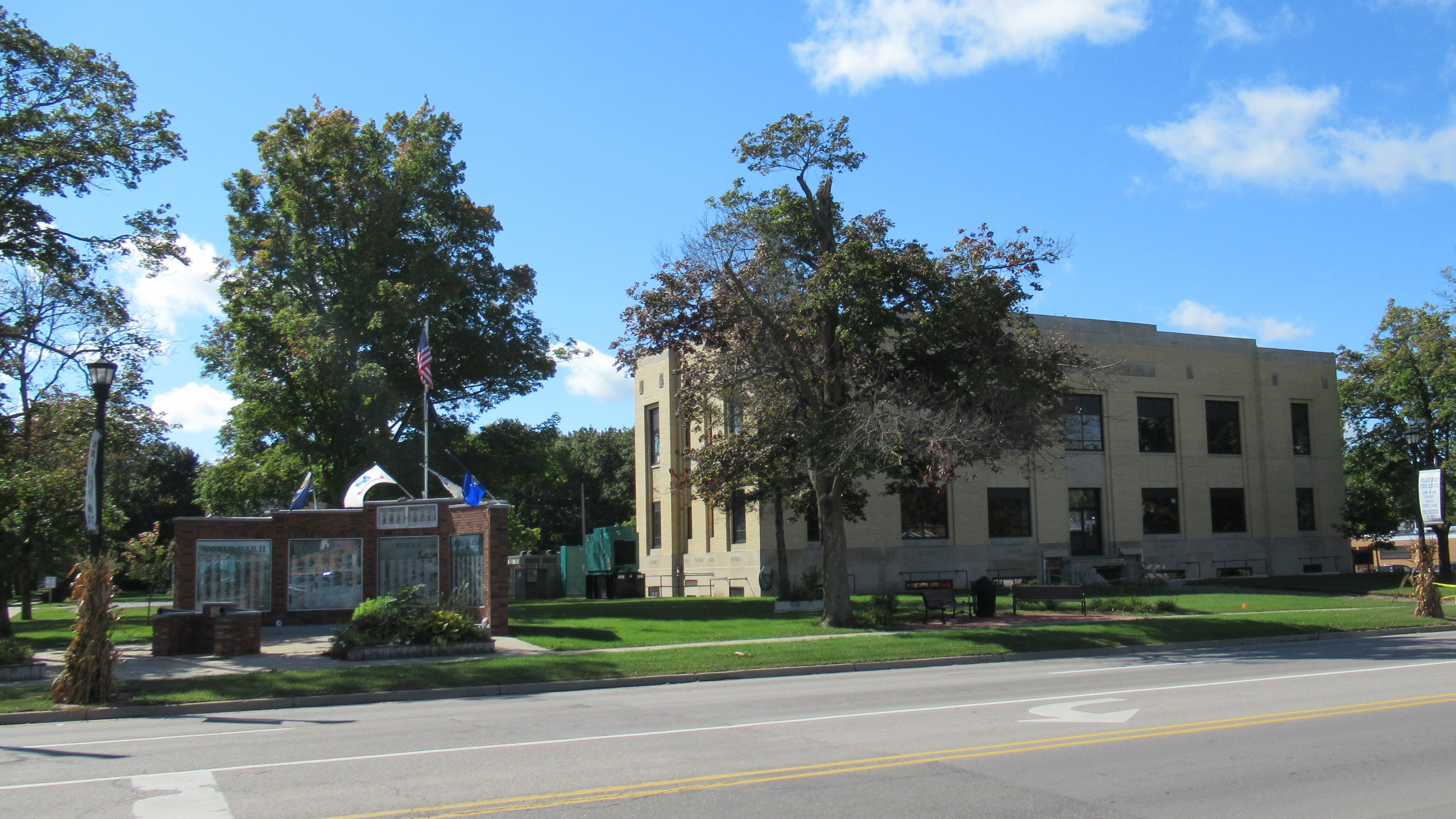
- Gladwin County Courthouse in Gladwin

- Seal

- Location within the U.S. state of Michigan
- Coordinates: 43°59′N 84°23′W
- Country: United States
- State: Michigan
- Created: 1831
- Organized: 1875
- Named for: Henry Gladwin
- Seat: Gladwin
- Largest city: Gladwin

Area
  - Total: 516 sq mi (1,340 km^{2})
  - Land: 502 sq mi (1,300 km^{2})
  - Water: 14 sq mi (36 km^{2}) 2.7%

Population (2020)
  - Total: 25,386
  - Estimate (2025): 26,077 ▲
  - Density: 51.9/sq mi (20.0/km^{2})
- Time zone: UTC−5 (Eastern)
  - Summer (DST): UTC−4 (EDT)
- Congressional district: 2nd
- Website: gladwincounty-mi.gov

Gladwin County is a county located in the U.S. state of Michigan. As of the 2020 Census, the population was 25,386. The county seat is Gladwin.

== History ==
=== Prehistory ===
Gladwin County is a headwaters area. Most of the water that flows out of the county via the Tittabawassee River comes from Gladwin County, only a very small portion flows in from Clare or Roscommon counties. Native Americans crossed this area, and even spent summers here where the fishing was good and summer berries plentiful.

Research is underway to determine the importance of an ancient trail that was noted by the crew of the 1839 re-survey of Township 17 north Range 2 west, which later became Beaverton Township. The eastern terminus of the "Muskegon River Trail" was plotted at the confluence of the three branches of the Tobacco (Assa-mo-quoi-Sepe) River in the northwest corner of Section 12. It is possible that an early cross-country route from Saginaw Bay to Lake Michigan proceeded up the Saginaw, Tittabawassee, and Tobacco Rivers to a point west across Ross Lake from the Beaverton City Cemetery. At that point, the canoes would be portaged along the trail to the Muskegon River, then floated down to Lake Michigan.

Many native artifacts have been found along that route that attest to seasonal occupation, but so far, no signs have been found to indicate a permanent settlement.

=== European arrival ===
The earliest documented visitors to the area were surveyors who platted the lands under provision of the 1787 Northwest Ordinance. Most of the early work was completed during the 1830s, although some of the survey work was faulty - the surveyors reportedly doubted that the area would ever be settled.

The earliest census to mention residents in the area was in 1860.

The county is named for Henry Gladwin, British military commandant at Detroit in 1763 during Pontiac's War. The county was set off and named in 1831, and its government was organized in 1875.

=== Sesquicentennial ===
The year 2011 marked 150 years since the first permanent settler of record, Marvel Secord, took up residence along the Tittabawassee River in what is now Secord Township. He was a trapper and trader who provided supplies to lumbering camps in the area. Another man, William Brayton, may have been an earlier settler; the 1860 census listed 14 residents, including two families with children. Of these, 11 were associated with lumbering camps that had begun to appear that year, and three were listed as "hunters." One of the "day laborers" at a camp had brought his wife to the area. The first issue of the Gladwin County Record (1878) mentions his 20 acres (8.1 hectares) of wheat under cultivation. His stepson, Dr. Russell E. Finch arrived in the area in 1875, becoming the county's first physician. William Brayton died in 1895. His claim to being the first permanent settler appears valid, except that just before the 1880 census was taken he and his wife went to Lynn, Massachusetts to care for his dying father. He returned to Gladwin after settling his father's estate in 1882, thus missing being included in the Gladwin County census for 1880.

== Geography ==
According to the U.S. Census Bureau, the county has a total area of 516 square miles (1,340 km^{2}), of which 502 square miles (1,300 km^{2}) is land and 14 square miles (36 km^{2}) (2.7%) is water. It is the second-smallest county in Michigan by total area. Gladwin County is sometimes considered to be a part of Central Michigan, and at other times is included in Northern Michigan.

=== Major highways ===
- M-18 runs north–south through the western part of the county. It runs south along the western county line from the county's northwestern corner for five miles (8.0 km) then runs east and south to Gladwin, then west and south to Beaverton. It exits the county six miles (9.7 km) from the southwestern county corner, running to an intersection with US 10.
- M-30 enters the northeastern part of county two miles (3.2 km) south of the northeastern corner. It runs westerly through the northern part of county, then turns to run south through the center part of county. The highway passes White Star and Billings before exiting the south county line near its midpoint.
- M-61 runs east–west through center part of county and passes Gladwin and White Star.

=== County designated highways ===
- F-97

=== Adjacent counties ===
- Ogemaw County – northeast
- Arenac County – east
- Bay County – southeast
- Midland County – south
- Clare County – west
- Isabella County – southwest
- Roscommon County – northwest

== Demographics ==
Historical population
Census	Pop.	Note	%±
1880	1,127		—
1890	4,208		273.4%
1900	6,564		56.0%
1910	8,413		28.2%
1920	8,827		4.9%
1930	7,424		−15.9%
1940	9,385		26.4%
1950	9,451		0.7%
1960	10,769		13.9%
1970	13,471		25.1%
1980	19,957		48.1%
1990	21,896		9.7%
2000	26,023		18.8%
2010	25,692		−1.3%
2020	25,386		−1.2%
2025 (est.)	26,077	▲	2.7%
US Decennial Census; 1790-1960 1900-90; 1990-2000 2010 2025

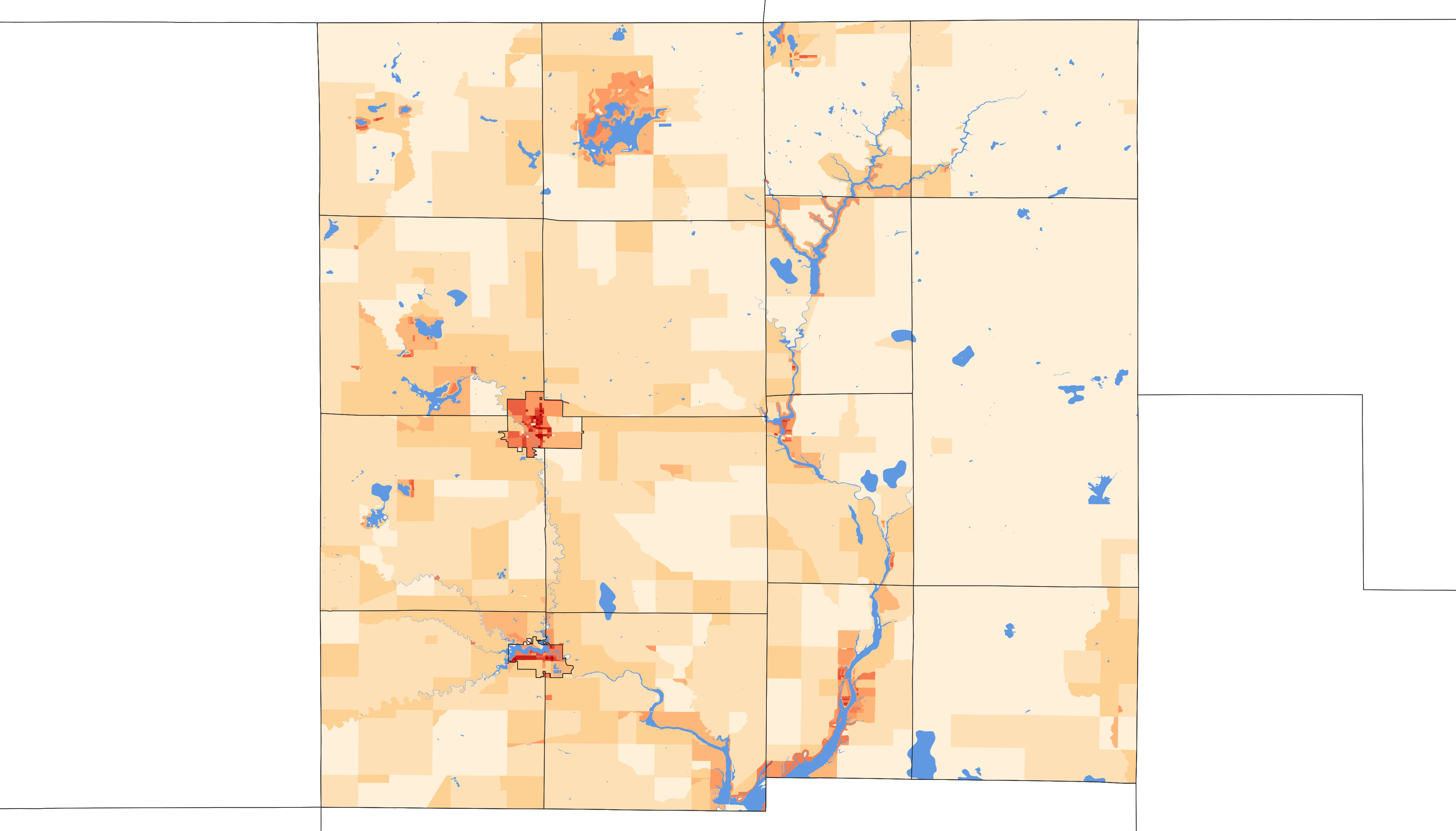
2020 population density of Gladwin County MI by census block

=== Racial and ethnic composition ===
Gladwin County, Michigan – Racial and ethnic composition Note: the US Census treats Hispanic/Latino as an ethnic category. This table excludes Latinos from the racial categories and assigns them to a separate category. Hispanics/Latinos may be of any race.
Race / Ethnicity (NH = Non-Hispanic)	Pop 1980	Pop 1990	Pop 2000	Pop 2010	Pop 2020	% 1980	% 1990	% 2000	% 2010	% 2020
White alone (NH)	19,710	21,590	25,256	24,904	23,830	98.76%	98.60%	97.05%	96.93%	93.87%
Black or African American alone (NH)	11	17	32	60	68	0.06%	0.08%	0.12%	0.23%	0.27%
Native American or Alaska Native alone (NH)	96	114	140	116	95	0.48%	0.52%	0.54%	0.45%	0.37%
Asian alone (NH)	19	38	69	76	72	0.10%	0.17%	0.27%	0.30%	0.28%
Native Hawaiian or Pacific Islander alone (NH)	x	x	4	1	0	x	x	0.02%	0.00%	0.00%
Other race alone (NH)	4	1	10	3	45	0.02%	0.00%	0.04%	0.01%	0.18%
Mixed race or Multiracial (NH)	x	x	263	222	794	x	x	1.01%	0.86%	3.13%
Hispanic or Latino (any race)	117	136	249	310	482	0.59%	0.62%	0.96%	1.21%	1.90%
Total	19,957	21,896	26,023	25,692	25,386	100.00%	100.00%	100.00%	100.00%	100.00%

=== 2020 census ===
As of the 2020 census, the county had a population of 25,386. The median age was 50.9 years; 18.9% of residents were under the age of 18 and 27.3% were 65 years of age or older. For every 100 females there were 102.0 males, and for every 100 females age 18 and over there were 100.0 males age 18 and over.

The racial makeup of the county was 94.7% White, 0.3% Black or African American, 0.4% American Indian and Alaska Native, 0.3% Asian, <0.1% Native Hawaiian and Pacific Islander, 0.5% from some other race, and 3.8% from two or more races. Hispanic or Latino residents of any race comprised 1.9% of the population.

<0.1% of residents lived in urban areas, while 100.0% lived in rural areas.

There were 11,006 households in the county, of which 21.7% had children under the age of 18 living in them. Of all households, 50.9% were married-couple households, 19.8% were households with a male householder and no spouse or partner present, and 22.2% were households with a female householder and no spouse or partner present. About 30.1% of all households were made up of individuals and 15.6% had someone living alone who was 65 years of age or older.

There were 16,862 housing units, of which 34.7% were vacant. Among occupied housing units, 84.0% were owner-occupied and 16.0% were renter-occupied. The homeowner vacancy rate was 1.8% and the rental vacancy rate was 6.7%.

=== 2000 census ===
As of the 2000 United States census, of 2000, there were 26,023 people, 10,561 households, and 7,614 families in the county. The population density was 51 people per square mile (20 people/km^{2}). There were 16,828 housing units at an average density of 33 per square mile (13/km^{2}). The racial makeup of the county was 97.65% White, 0.13% Black or African American, 0.56% Native American, 0.27% Asian, 0.02% Pacific Islander, 0.31% from other races, and 1.06% from two or more races. 0.96% of the population were Hispanic or Latino of any race. 28.1% were of German, 11.5% American, 11.1% English, 9.4% Irish, 7.3% Polish and 6.4% French ancestry according to Census 2000. 96.3% spoke English, 1.7% German and 1.1% Spanish as their first language.

There were 10,561 households, out of which 27.10% had children under the age of 18 living with them, 60.50% were married couples living together, 8.00% had a female householder with no husband present, and 27.90% were non-families. 24.00% of all households were made up of individuals, and 11.20% had someone living alone who was 65 years of age or older. The average household size was 2.43 and the average family size was 2.85.

The county population contained 23.20% under the age of 18, 6.50% from 18 to 24, 24.20% from 25 to 44, 27.80% from 45 to 64, and 18.30% who were 65 years of age or older. The median age was 42 years. For every 100 females there were 98.50 males. For every 100 females age 18 and over, there were 95.30 males.

The median income for a household in the county was $32,019, and the median income for a family was $37,090. Males had a median income of $33,871 versus $21,956 for females. The per capita income for the county was $16,614. About 10.40% of families and 13.80% of the population were below the poverty line, including 19.40% of those under age 18 and 7.30% of those age 65 or over.

== Government ==
Gladwin County has been reliably Republican from the beginning. Since 1884, the Republican Party nominee has carried the county vote in 86% of the elections (31 of 36 elections).

United States presidential election results for Gladwin County, Michigan
Year	Republican		Democratic		Third party(ies)	
Year	No.	%	No.	%	No.	%
1884	288	55.49%	213	41.04%	18	3.47%
1888	525	58.79%	357	39.98%	11	1.23%
1892	531	60.76%	325	37.19%	18	2.06%
1896	748	67.09%	323	28.97%	44	3.95%
1900	978	75.23%	299	23.00%	23	1.77%
1904	1,093	79.49%	231	16.80%	51	3.71%
1908	1,168	71.35%	386	23.58%	83	5.07%
1912	638	39.07%	331	20.27%	664	40.66%
1916	935	52.88%	729	41.23%	104	5.88%
1920	1,687	78.68%	313	14.60%	144	6.72%
1924	1,908	78.36%	255	10.47%	272	11.17%
1928	1,795	83.76%	341	15.91%	7	0.33%
1932	1,378	43.86%	1,661	52.86%	103	3.28%
1936	1,645	49.21%	1,533	45.86%	165	4.94%
1940	2,741	67.78%	1,294	32.00%	9	0.22%
1944	2,457	70.93%	985	28.44%	22	0.64%
1948	2,062	66.43%	963	31.02%	79	2.55%
1952	3,031	75.85%	936	23.42%	29	0.73%
1956	3,121	73.47%	1,117	26.29%	10	0.24%
1960	3,282	69.65%	1,424	30.22%	6	0.13%
1964	1,941	41.45%	2,725	58.19%	17	0.36%
1968	2,840	56.55%	1,668	33.21%	514	10.23%
1972	3,484	61.94%	2,016	35.84%	125	2.22%
1976	3,794	50.14%	3,719	49.15%	54	0.71%
1980	4,509	51.09%	3,733	42.30%	583	6.61%
1984	5,401	61.07%	3,368	38.08%	75	0.85%
1988	4,746	52.82%	4,164	46.34%	76	0.85%
1992	3,616	33.56%	4,457	41.36%	2,703	25.08%
1996	3,670	34.32%	5,494	51.38%	1,528	14.29%
2000	5,743	49.39%	5,573	47.92%	313	2.69%
2004	6,770	51.18%	6,343	47.95%	114	0.86%
2008	6,391	48.27%	6,590	49.77%	260	1.96%
2012	6,661	52.94%	5,760	45.78%	162	1.29%
2016	8,124	64.77%	3,794	30.25%	624	4.98%
2020	9,893	67.69%	4,524	30.95%	198	1.35%
2024	10,809	69.79%	4,501	29.06%	178	1.15%

United States Senate election results for Gladwin County, Michigan1
Year	Republican		Democratic		Third party(ies)	
Year	No.	%	No.	%	No.	%
2024	10,239	67.39%	4,537	29.86%	417	2.74%

Michigan Gubernatorial election results for Gladwin County
Year	Republican		Democratic		Third party(ies)	
Year	No.	%	No.	%	No.	%
2022	7,357	61.18%	4,422	36.77%	246	2.05%

The county government operates the jail, maintains rural roads, operates the major local courts, records deeds, mortgages, and vital records, administers public health regulations, and participates with the state in the provision of social services. The county board of commissioners controls the budget and has limited authority to make laws or ordinances. In Michigan, most local government functions — police and fire, building and zoning, tax assessment, street maintenance, etc. — are the responsibility of individual cities and townships.

=== Elected officials ===
- Prosecuting Attorney: Mark Toaz
- Sheriff: Michael Shea
- County Clerk: Constance White
- County Treasurer: Christy VanTiem
- Register of Deeds: Ann Manning-Clayton
- Drain Commissioner: Terry Walters
- Road Commissioners: Chuck Hinman
- County Administrator:
- Commissioner Dist. 1 – Mike Visnaw
- Commissioner Dist. 2 – Alan Donaldson
- Commissioner Dist. 3 – Tim Mester
- Commissioner Dist. 4 – Karen Moore
- Commissioner Dist. 5 – Tom Winarski

(information as of 2024)

== Communities ==
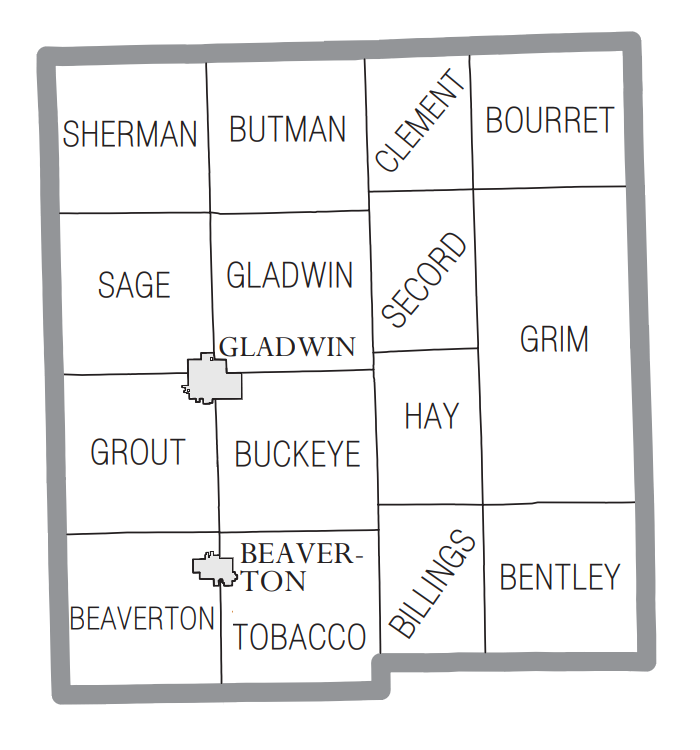
U.S. Census data map showing local municipal boundaries within Gladwin County. Shaded areas represent incorporated cities.

=== Cities ===
- Beaverton
- Gladwin (county seat)

=== Civil townships ===
- Beaverton Township
- Bentley Township
- Billings Township
- Bourret Township
- Buckeye Township
- Butman Township
- Clement Township
- Gladwin Township
- Grim Township
- Grout Township
- Hay Township
- Sage Township
- Secord Township
- Sherman Township
- Tobacco Township

=== Unincorporated communities ===
- Albright Shores
- Billings
- Butman
- Dale
- Estey
- Hockaday
- Lockwood Beach
- Rhodes
- Secord
- Skeels
- Sugar Rapids
- White Star
- Wildwood Shores
- Winegars
- Wooden Shoe Village

=== Ghost town ===
- Hard Luck

== Education ==
The Clare-Gladwin Regional Education Service District, based in Clare, services the students in the county along with those of Clare County. The intermediate school district offers regional special education services, early education and after-school programs, and technical career pathways for students of its districts.

Gladwin County is served by the following regular public school districts:

- Beaverton Schools
- Gladwin Community Schools

Gladwin County has the following private schools:

- Lilac Grove Amish School (Amish)
- Meadow Brook (Amish)
- Skeels Christian School (Baptist)
- Southwell Amish School (Amish)

== See also ==
- List of Michigan State Historic Sites in Gladwin County, Michigan
- National Register of Historic Places listings in Gladwin County, Michigan
