= Edenville =

Edenville may refer to:

- Edenville, Free State, South Africa
- Edenville, Michigan, United States
- Edenville Township, Michigan, United States

== See also ==
- Edanville, Missouri
