= Edenville Dam =

Dam in Gladwin and Midland counties, Michigan, United States

- Location within the state of Michigan
- Location: Gladwin and Midland counties, Michigan, U.S.
- Coordinates: 43°48′51″N 84°22′35″W
- Purpose: Power, recreation
- Opening date: 1925; 101 years ago
- Demolition date: 2020; 6 years ago (destroyed by flood)

Dam and spillways
- Type of dam: Earth fill dam
- Impounds: Tittabawassee River
- Height: 54 ft (16 m)
- Length: 6,600 ft (2,000 m)

Reservoir
- Creates: Wixom Lake
- Total capacity: 66,200 acre-feet (81,700,000 m^{3})
- Surface area: 5.7 sq mi (15 km^{2})
- Normal elevation: 676 ft (206 m)

Edenville Dam was an earthen embankment dam at the confluence of the Tittabawassee River and the Tobacco River in Mid Michigan, United States, forming Wixom Lake. The dam was about one mile (1.6 km) north of Edenville, mostly in the southeast corner of Tobacco Township in Gladwin County, with its southeastern end reaching into Edenville Township in Midland County. Its height was 54 feet (16 m), the length was 6,600 feet (2,000 m) at its crest.

The dam was built in 1924 for hydroelectric power and flood control. The dam was equipped with two 2.4 MW turbines capable of generating 4.8 MW of electricity in total.

In May 2020, following heavy rains, the Edenville Dam breached and the Sanford Dam downstream overflowed, which caused major flooding in Midland County, including the city of Midland.

== History ==
The dam was built in 1924 by Frank Isaac Wixom, after whom the reservoir formed by the dam is named. Wixom used to own a circus before he built the dam.

The dam is privately owned and operated by Boyce Hydro Power, a company based in Edenville, which also owned three other hydroelectric facilities on the Tittabawassee: the Secord, Smallwood, and Sanford Dams.

=== Safety and lake level disputes ===
In an exercise of a rarely used legal authority, the Federal Energy Regulatory Commission (FERC) terminated Boyce Hydro Power's license in 2018, because of its "inability to pass the Probable Maximum Flood (PMF)", as well as seven other failures. The Commission was concerned that "the dam may not have the ability to pass enough water, if a severe flood were to hit, among other issues and violations."

Following the Commission's 2018 license revocation, the Michigan Department of Environment, Great Lakes, and Energy (EGLE) took oversight of the dam. EGLE determined that the dam was structurally sound. Edenville and the other former Boyce dams were taken over in 2019 by the Four Lakes Task Force, a county delegated authority, with title to transfer in early 2022. The State of Michigan appropriated $5 million for the purchase. The Four Lakes Task Force operates under the Four Lakes Assessment District in the State of Michigan, created in May 2019 by Judge Stephen Carras. In 2019, Michigan's 42nd Circuit Court was involved in determining if only the lakefront owners or all area residents would pay tax to the Four Lakes Assessment District.

In October 2018, and again in mid-November 2019, the dam's operator lowered the water level, in what it called a safety move. It said it had requested a permit to lower the level from Michigan's EGLE, a permit that was not issued. The operator said it acted “due to concern for the safety of its operators and the downstream community,” and went on to sue EGLE in federal court, alleging "its safety concerns were paramount."

In December 2019, the Federal Energy Regulatory Commission issued a permit to investigate expanding the hydropower plant with a second powerhouse containing one 1.2 MW turbine-generator unit for a total of 6 MW.

The dam's operator said it began to raise the lake's water level in April 2020, under threat of being sued by Michigan's EGLE, and that it reached "normal pond level" in the first week of May 2020. Michigan's Attorney General Dana Nessel confirmed EGLE had directed the operator to raise the water level, stating: "Michigan EGLE directed Boyce to follow the court-ordered lake level requirements," but challenged that the operator had lowered it for safety reasons.

In April 2020, EGLE sued Boyce, alleging it had lowered the water level without permission in 2018 and 2019, killing thousands of freshwater mussels.

In October 2022, however, a federal judge accepted as basic facts that Boyce had conducted what the Michigan Attorney General called a "propaganda" campaign trying to blame the State of Michigan for keeping water levels high, when in fact, Boyce had continually touted the structural safety of the Edenville Dam.

=== Dam failure ===
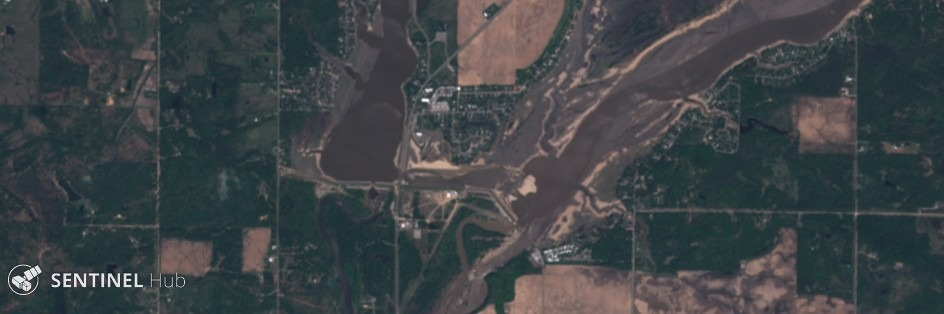
Copernicus Programme image of the dam after failure, showing the new river channel east of the original spillway.

On 19 May 2020 at 17:46 EDT heavy rainfall pushed inflows far beyond design capacity and the east embankment of Edenville Dam gave way. Immediate, mandatory evacuations were ordered for residents of Edenville and nearby Sanford. Roughly 10 miles (16 km) downstream the impounded water overtopped – but did not breach – the Sanford Dam, forcing the evacuation of much of Midland another six miles (9.7 km) downstream.

Governor Gretchen Whitmer declared a state of emergency that evening and directed state regulators to open an investigation into Boyce Hydro, the dam’s private owner. More than 10 000 people eventually fled their homes; officials also urged evacuees to observe social‑distancing rules because the failure occurred during the COVID‑19 pandemic.

The Tittabawassee River crested at 35.05 feet (10.68 m) during the night of 20 May, inundating eastern Midland and severely damaging the village of Sanford. Satellite imagery released two days later showed a new river channel carved around the failed spillway. Although floodwater surrounded parts of the Dow Chemical complex in Midland, the company reported no serious damage to critical infrastructure. No fatalities or serious injuries were recorded.

==== Lawsuits ====
Within days of the disaster three class‑action lawsuits were filed; plaintiffs alleged negligence by both Boyce Hydro and Michigan’s Department of Environment, Great Lakes, and Energy (EGLE). On 8 September 2023 the Michigan Court of Appeals allowed those actions to proceed, citing a 2020 precedent stemming from the Flint water crisis.

==== Forensic Report ====
The FERC convened an Independent Forensic Team (IFT) to determine the technical cause of the breach. The team’s final report (4 May 2022) concluded that the failure was “foreseeable and preventable.” It traced the breach to loose sands placed in the 1920s embankment, which became saturated and underwent static liquefaction; the downstream face had also been built steeper than safety criteria allowed. The IFT emphasised that design errors, construction deviations and decades of regulatory oversights collectively doomed the structure long before 2020.^{(pp. S‑4 – S‑5)} Media coverage summarised the report as proof that the disaster was avoidable.

==== Repair ====
In March 2022 the state enacted a US$4.8 billion infrastructure package that earmarked funds for reconstructing Edenville and the three other Four Lakes dams. Early planning redirected the Tittabawassee back through the original spillway, causing the temporary Edenville Falls—created in the breach channel—to dry up.

==== Midland roads & bridges ====
The Midland County Road Commission estimated flood damage to bridges and pavement at about US$17 million.
