= Buckeye Township, Michigan =

- Civil township
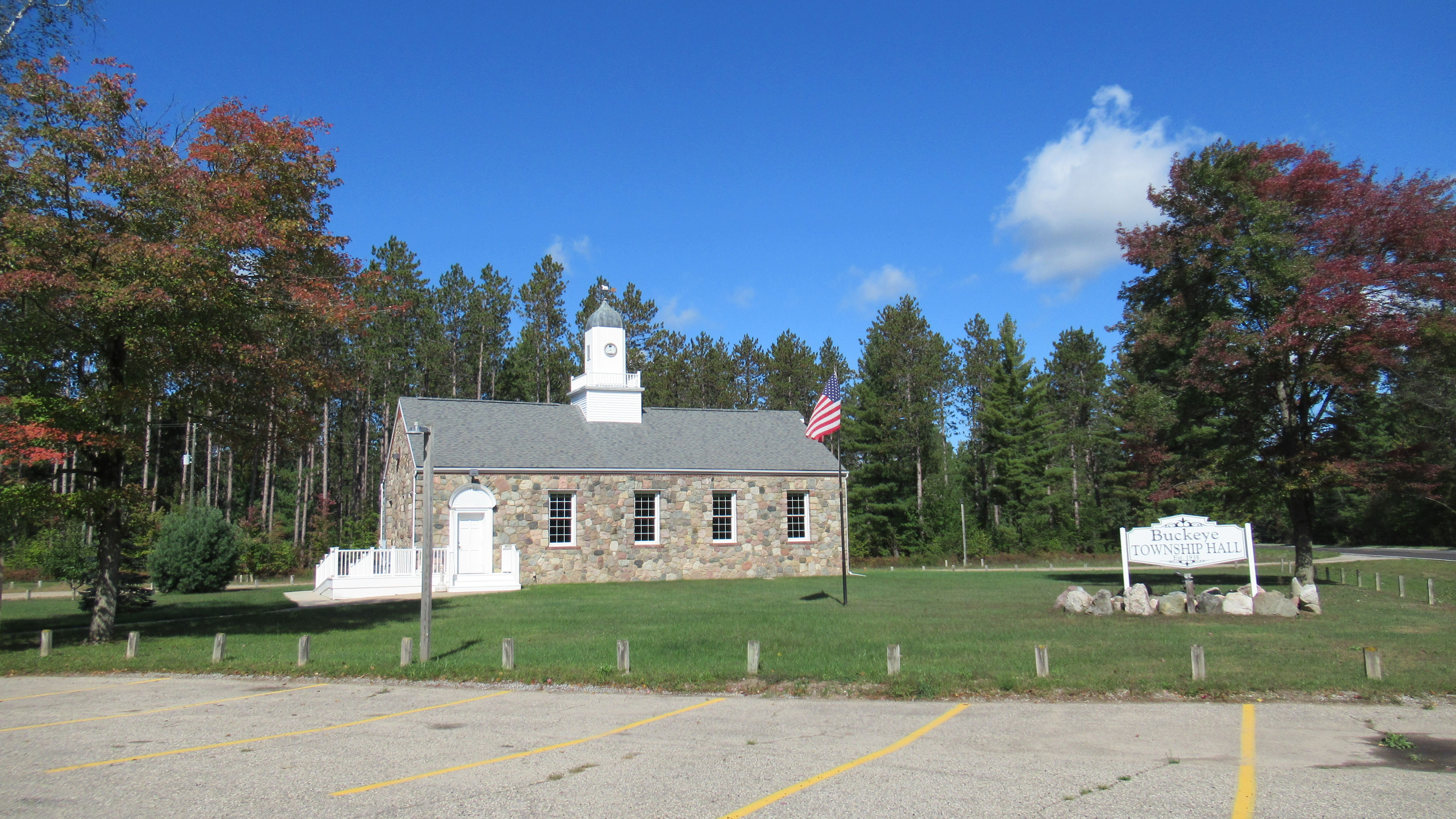
- Buckeye Township Hall

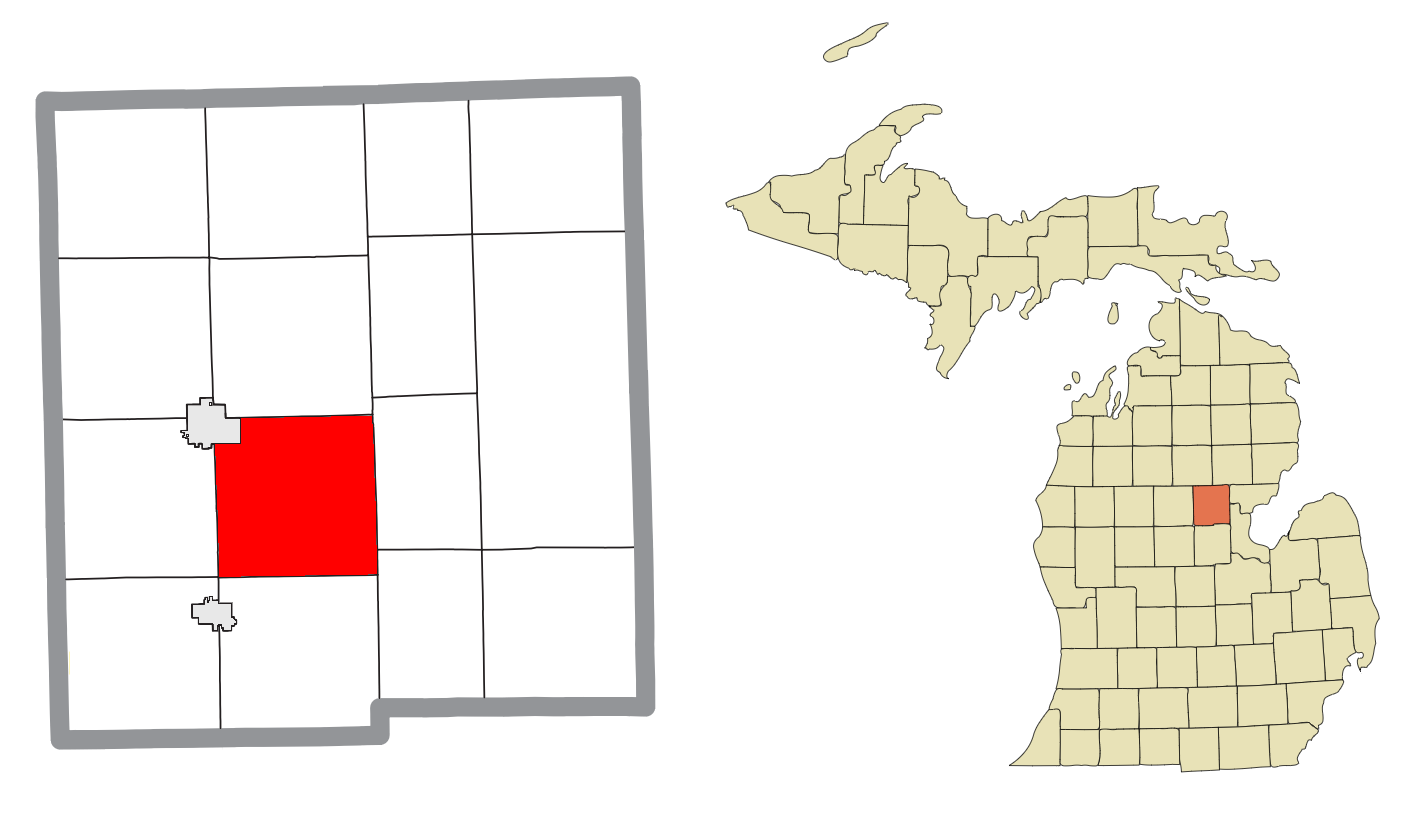
- Location within Gladwin County

- Location within the state of Michigan Location within the United States
- Coordinates: 43°56′43″N 84°25′16″W
- Country: United States
- State: Michigan
- County: Gladwin
- Established: 1938

Government
  - Supervisor: Kevin VanTiem
  - Clerk: Susan Walker

Area
  - Total: 34.56 sq mi (89.51 km^{2})
  - Land: 34.17 sq mi (88.50 km^{2})
  - Water: 0.39 sq mi (1.01 km^{2})
- Elevation: 745 ft (227 m)

Population (2020)
  - Total: 1,360
  - Density: 39.8/sq mi (15.4/km^{2})
- Time zone: UTC-5 (Eastern (EST))
  - Summer (DST): UTC-4 (EDT)
- ZIP code(s): 48612 (Beaverton); 48624 (Gladwin)
- Area code: 989
- FIPS code: 26-11440
- GNIS feature ID: 1625998
- Website: https://buckeyetownship.org/

Buckeye Township is a civil township of Gladwin County in the U.S. state of Michigan. As of the 2020 census, the township population was 1,360.

== Geography ==
According to the U.S. Census Bureau, the township has a total area of 34.56 square miles (89.51 km^{2}), of which 34.17 square miles (88.50 km^{2}) is land and 0.39 square miles (1.01 km^{2}) (1.13%) is water.

The city of Gladwin is at the northwest corner and incorporates land that was formerly part of the township. The eastern boundary of the township is the meridian used in the survey of Michigan land. The Cedar River flows through the western portion of the township, and the Tittabawassee River flows through the northeast corner.

== Transportation ==
=== Major highways ===
- M-30 runs south–north and forms the majority of the eastern boundary of the township.
- M-61 runs west–east through the northern portion of the township.

South River Road runs south and north bound through the township.

=== Airport ===
- Gladwin Zettel Memorial Airport is partially located within the township in the northwest corner.

== Demographics ==
As of the census of 2000, there were 1,333 people, 495 households, and 372 families residing in the township. The population density was 38.5 inhabitants per square mile (14.9/km^{2}). There were 645 housing units at an average density of 18.6 per square mile (7.2/km^{2}). The racial makeup of the township was 96.62% White, 0.15% African American, 0.38% Native American, 0.23% Asian, 0.08% Pacific Islander, 1.58% from other races, and 0.98% from two or more races. Hispanic or Latino of any race were 1.88% of the population.

There were 495 households, out of which 34.5% had children under the age of 18 living with them, 59.6% were married couples living together, 8.7% had a female householder with no husband present, and 24.8% were non-families. 20.0% of all households were made up of individuals, and 8.9% had someone living alone who was 65 years of age or older. The average household size was 2.69 and the average family size was 3.07.

In the township the population was spread out, with 27.8% under the age of 18, 7.8% from 18 to 24, 28.7% from 25 to 44, 24.0% from 45 to 64, and 11.6% who were 65 years of age or older. The median age was 36 years. For every 100 females, there were 107.6 males. For every 100 females age 18 and over, there were 102.5 males.

The median income for a household in the township was $31,591, and the median income for a family was $36,500. Males had a median income of $32,250 versus $19,013 for females. The per capita income for the township was $13,709. About 14.1% of families and 17.3% of the population were below the poverty line, including 21.0% of those under age 18 and 7.1% of those age 65 or over.
