= Little Cedar River (Tobacco River tributary) =

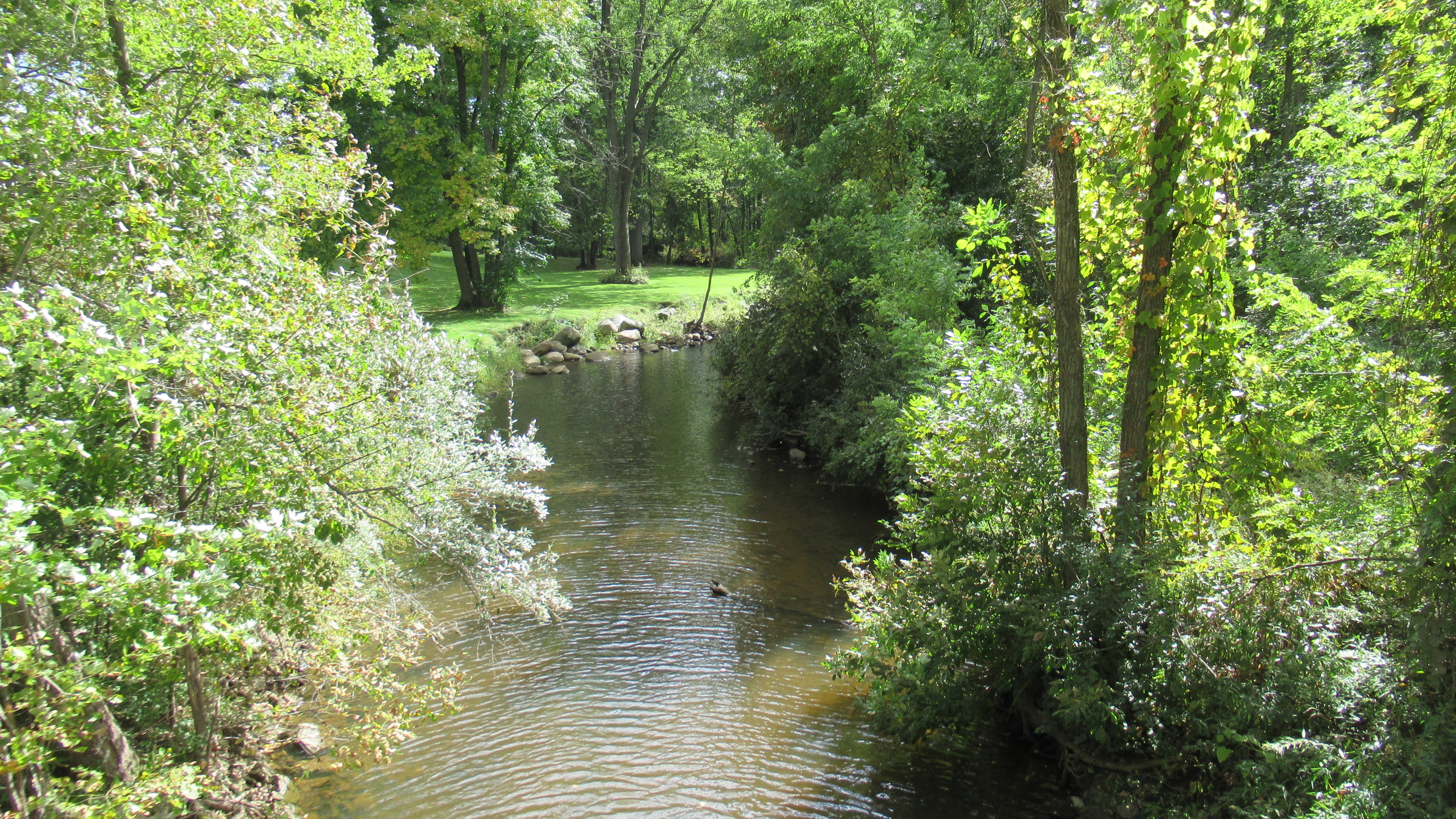
- The river along Dale Road in Tobacco Township

- Location within the state of Michigan

Location
- Country: United States
- State: Michigan

Physical characteristics
- Source
  - location: Buckeye Township, Michigan
  - coordinates: 43°55′08″N 84°24′18″W
- Mouth
  - location: Tobacco River
  - coordinates: 43°50′30″N 84°23′17″W
  - elevation: 676 ft (206 m)
- Length: 8.1 miles (13.0 km)

Little Cedar River is an 8.1-mile-long (13.0 km) river in Gladwin County in the U.S. state of Michigan.

The Little Cedar rises in Buckeye Township at 43°55′08″N 84°24′18″W, and flows primarily south into the Tobacco River at 43°50′30″N 84°23′17″W.

Pete Drain, which feeds into the Little Cedar, is also known as the Little Cedar River.

== Tributaries ==
From the mouth:

- (right) Otgen Drain
- (left) Snyder Drain
- (right) Hoover Drain
- (right) Crockett Drain
- (left) Dow Creek
- (left) Rich Drain
- (right) Smith Drain
- (right) Hay Drain
- (right) McMahan Drain
  - (left) Martin Drain
- (right) Graham Drain
  - (left) Bennet Drain
- (right) Pete Drain
