= Edenville, Michigan =

- Unincorporated community
- Location within the state of Michigan
- Coordinates: 43°47′58″N 84°22′54″W
- Country: United States
- State: Michigan
- County: Midland
- Township: Edenville
- Elevation: 676 ft (206 m)
- Time zone: UTC-5 (Eastern (EST))
  - Summer (DST): UTC-4 (EDT)
- ZIP code(s): 48628 (Hope)
- Area code: 989
- GNIS feature ID: 625353

Edenville is a small unincorporated community in Edenville Township, Midland County in the U.S. state of Michigan.

The community is in the northeast corner of the township near the boundary with Gladwin County, but the settlement is mostly within Midland County. It is on M-30, about 15 miles northwest of Midland.

Edenville is situated on the east side of the Tittabawassee River, opposite the point where the Tobacco River flows into the Tittabawassee. The Edenville Dam is less than a mile north and blocks the flow of both rivers to form Wixom Lake. The dam and Wixom Lake are almost entirely within Gladwin County. Settlement has extended northward from Edenville along M-30 and the Tobacco River shores of the lake which is sometimes associated with Edenville, although it is actually part of Tobacco Township.

The community is at 43°47′58″N 84°22′54″W, which is about a mile west of the meridian used for the surveying of Michigan in the early 19th century. Just south of town, M-30 turns east before turning south again to run almost directly on the meridian into Sanford. The community was founded in 1854.

The area serves as a popular spring and summer time resort for locals as it is located near Wixom Lake, which is used for fishing and recreational use. Most boat access sites for the lake are located in Gladwin County.

== Highways ==
- M-30
