= M-61 (Michigan highway) =

State highway in Michigan, United States

M-61
- M-61 highlighted in red

Route information
- Maintained by MDOT
- Length: 62.276 mi (100.224 km)
- Existed: c. July 1, 1919–present

Major junctions
- West end: M-115 in Marion
- M-66 near Marion; US 127 in Harrison; M-18 in Gladwin; M-30 in Wooden Shoe Village; I-75 near Standish
- East end: US 23 in Standish

Location
- Country: United States
- State: Michigan
- Counties: Osceola, Clare, Gladwin, Bay, Arenac

Highway system
- Michigan State Trunkline Highway System; Interstate; US; State; Byways
← M-60	→ M-62

M-61 is a state trunkline highway in the US state of Michigan that runs between Marion and Standish. The highway runs along the boundary area between Northern Michigan and Central Michigan in the Lower Peninsula. M-61 runs through rural forestland connecting several smaller communities together as it connects M-115, US Highway 127 (US 127), Interstate 75 (I-75) and US 23. Less than 10,000 vehicles a day use various segments of the roadway on average.

The trunkline was first designated along a portion of its current alignment by 1919. M-61 was extended in segments through 1940, with a truncation at the end of the 1950s. One change in routing in the 1970s resulted in the current routing of the highway.

== Route description ==
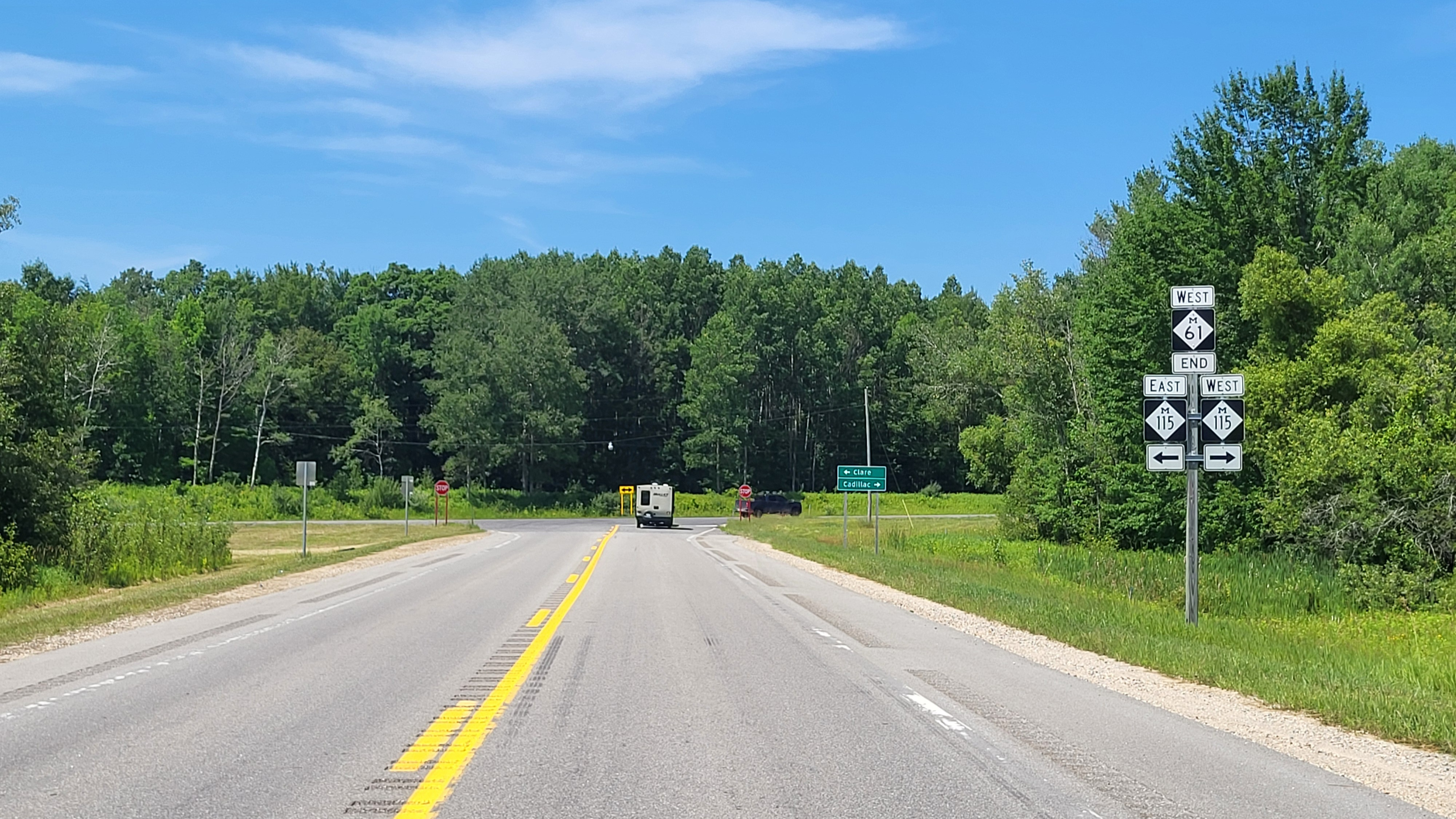
Western terminus at M-115 in Middle Branch Township

M-61 starts in eastern Osceola County south of Marion at an intersection with M-115. It runs eastward and meets M-66 before crossing into Clare County. The highway runs along the boundary between the regions of Northern and Central Michigan through forest land and crosses the Muskegon River en route to Harrison. There it follows Main Street into town to an intersection with 1st Street near Budd Lake. M-61 turns south at the intersection and joins the business loop of US 127 (Bus. US 127) through town. Bus. US 127/M-61 follows Clare Avenue south of the city to exit 170 on the US 127 freeway. The business loop ends, and M-61 turns east along Gladwin Road.

The highway passes south of Wiggins Lake as it approaches the junction with M-18 in Gladwin. The two highways run concurrently on Cedar Avenue for approximately ten blocks through downtown. M-61 leaves town on the east side near the airport. The highway continues eastward to a junction with M-30 (Meridian Road) in White Star on the west banks of the Smallwood Lake section of the Tittabawassee River. The highway crosses the river and runs through Wooden Shoe Village as it continues through the Au Sable State Forest, crossing extreme northern Bay County. The trunkline crosses into Arenac County before meeting I-75 and US 23 in Arenac County near Standish.

The Michigan Department of Transportation (MDOT) maintains M-61 like all other state trunkline highways in the state. As a part of these maintenance responsibilities, the department tracks the volume of traffic along its roadways using a metric called average annual daily traffic (AADT). This is a measurement of the traffic along a segment of roadway for any average day of the year. The highest traffic level for M-61 in MDOT's 2009 surveys was 9,257 vehicles per day along the Harrison business loop. The lowest AADT was 981 vehicles daily between the Osceola–Clare county line and the Muskegon River crossing. No section of M-61 has been added to the National Highway System, a network of roads important to the country's defense, economy and mobility.

== History ==
On July 1, 1919, when the rest of the state highway system was first signed, M-61 ran between M-18 at Gladwin to M-30 at White Star. A decade later in 1929, M-61 was extended south to Winegars along M-30 and then northeasterly zig-zagging through Highwood and Bentley to Standish. This eastern extension was straightened in 1932, bypassing the route south through Winegars and Bentley to use a direct course between White Star and Standish. At the same time, a second, discontinuous section of M-61 was created when a section of the contemporary M-63 was redesignated M-61 between US 131 at Tustin and M-115 near Marion. At the same time, additional county roads were upgraded to state highways, extending the western M-61 to US 127 in Harrison. The gap between Harrison and Gladwin was eliminated in 1940 when the roadway was built between the two towns. At the end of the 1950s, M-61's designation was removed between M-115 and US 131. The western end was realigned in 1974 to bypass Marion, shortening the route of M-61.

== Major intersections ==
County	Location	mi	km	Destinations	Notes
Osceola	Middle Branch Township	0.000	0.000	M-115 – Cadillac, Clare	
Osceola	Middle Branch Township	0.921	1.482	M-66 – Lake City, Ionia	
Clare	Harrison	18.663	30.035	Bus. US 127 north	Northern end of Bus. US 127 concurrency
Clare	Hayes Township	21.322– 21.343	34.314– 34.348	US 127 – Grayling, Clare Bus. US 127 north	Southern end of Bus. US 127 concurrency at exit 170
Gladwin	Gladwin	35.007	56.338	M-18 south – Beaverton	Western end of M-18 concurrency
Gladwin	Gladwin	35.944	57.846	M-18 north – Houghton Lake	Eastern end of M-18 concurrency
Gladwin	Buckeye–Hay township line	41.949	67.510	M-30 (Meridian Road) – West Branch, Edenville	
Bay	No major junctions				
Arenac	Lincoln Township	59.422– 59.459	95.630– 95.690	I-75 – Mackinac Bridge, Saginaw	Exit 190 on I-75
Arenac	Standish	62.276	100.224	US 23 / LHCT – Alpena, Saginaw	Road continues east as Main Street/Pine River Road
1.000 mi = 1.609 km; 1.000 km = 0.621 mi: Concurrency terminus
