= Molasses River =

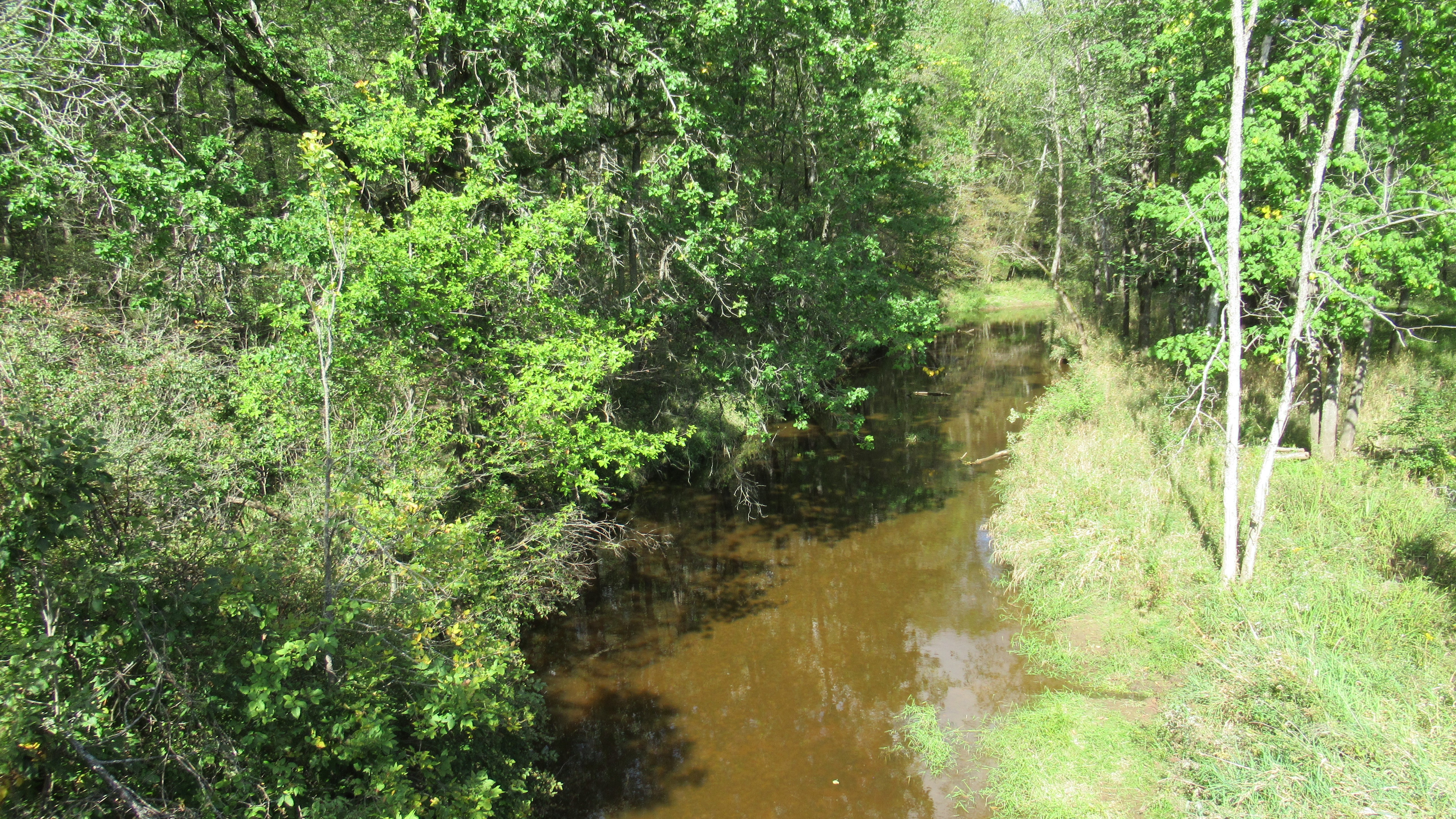
- The river along M-61 in Grim Township

- Location within the state of Michigan

Location
- Country: United States

Physical characteristics
- Source
  - location: Michigan
- Mouth
  - location: 43°56′01″N 84°18′06″W

The Molasses River is a 16.8-mile-long (27.0 km) river in Gladwin County, Michigan, in the United States. It is a tributary of the Tittabawassee River, part of the Saginaw River watershed.

== See also ==
- List of rivers of Michigan
