= Tobacco Township, Michigan =

- Civil township
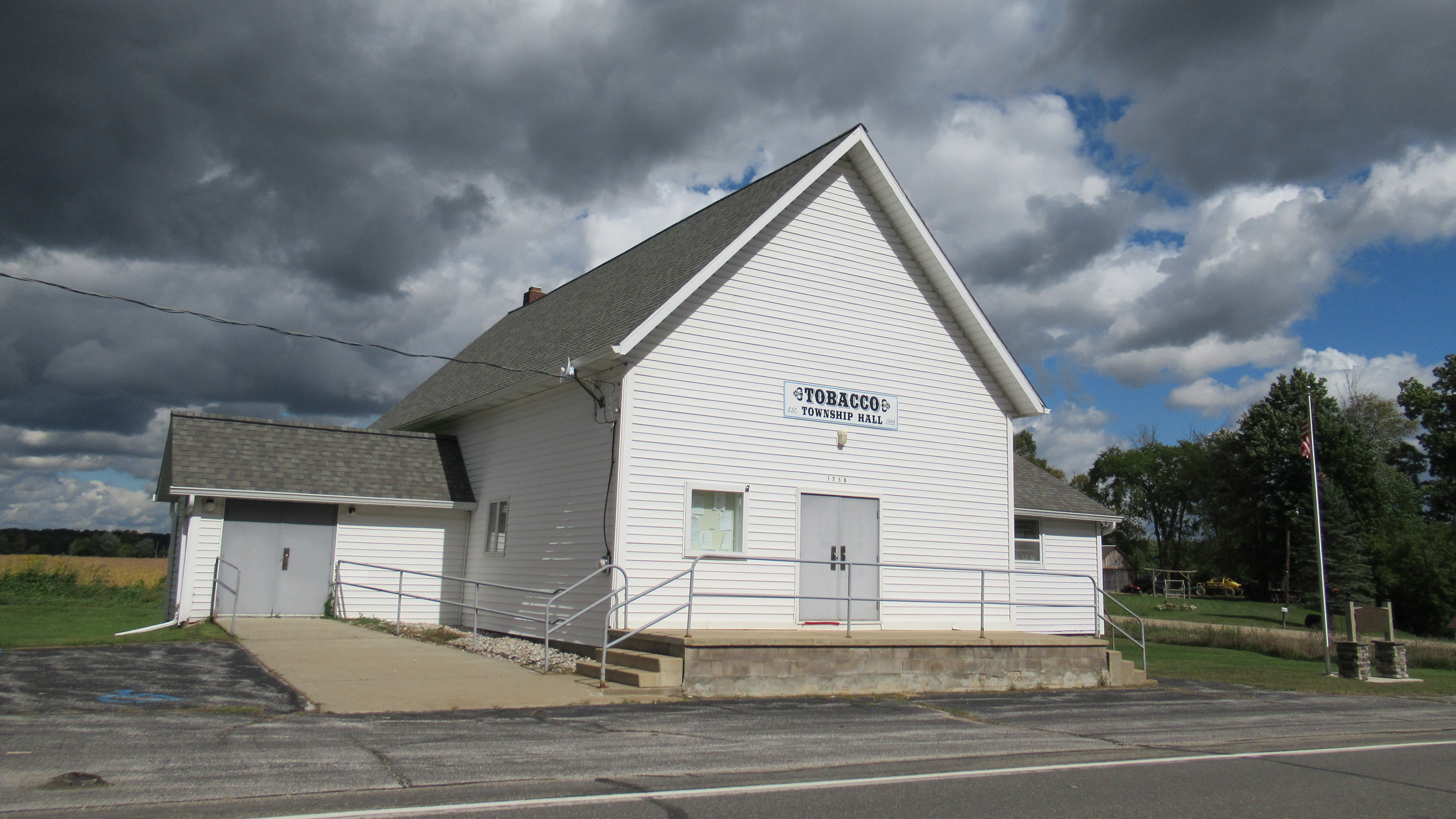
- Tobacco Township Hall

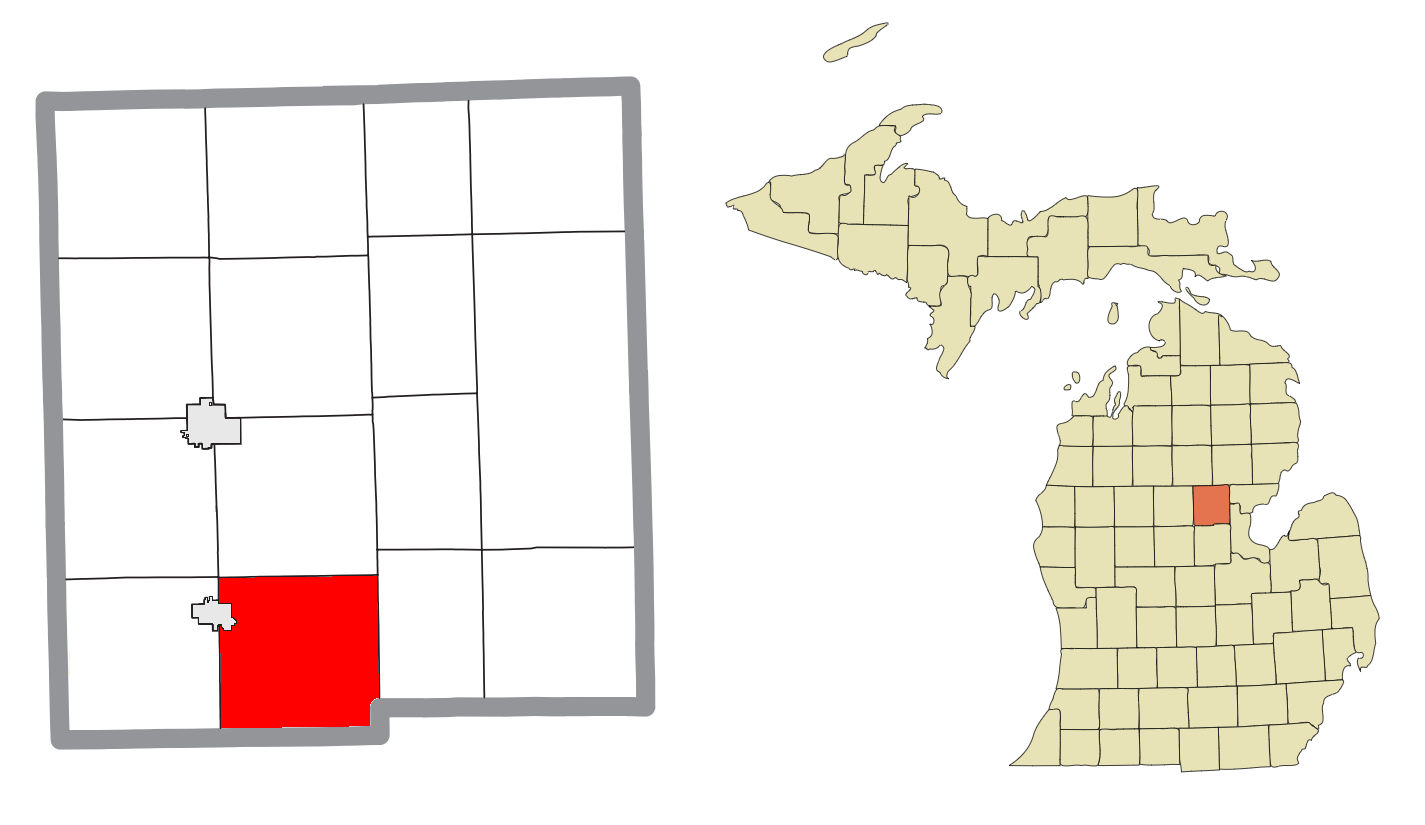
- Location within Gladwin County

- Location within the state of Michigan Location within the United States
- Coordinates: 43°52′00″N 84°26′00″W
- Country: United States
- State: Michigan
- County: Gladwin
- Established: 1884

Government
  - Supervisor: Craig Bergman
  - Clerk: Roshelle Brubaker

Area
  - Total: 35.22 sq mi (91.22 km^{2})
  - Land: 33.75 sq mi (87.41 km^{2})
  - Water: 1.47 sq mi (3.81 km^{2})
- Elevation: 705 ft (215 m)

Population (2020)
  - Total: 2,459
  - Density: 72.86/sq mi (28.13/km^{2})
- Time zone: UTC-5 (Eastern (EST))
  - Summer (DST): UTC-4 (EDT)
- ZIP code(s): 48612 (Beaverton)
- Area code: 989
- FIPS code: 26-79860
- GNIS feature ID: 1627167
- Website: Official website

Tobacco Township is a civil township of Gladwin County in the U.S. state of Michigan. The population was 2,459 at the 2020 census.

== Communities ==
- Beaverton was partially located in the northwestern portion of the township but became autonomous when it incorporated as a city in 1903.
- Dale is a former community that was settled in 1895 and also had its own post office.

== Geography ==
According to the U.S. Census Bureau, the township has a total area of 35.22 square miles (91.22 km^{2}), of which 33.75 square miles (87.41 km^{2}) is land and 1.47 square miles (3.81 km^{2}) (4.17%) is water.

The Tobacco River flows southeast through the center of the township. The Little Cedar River also runs through the township and is a tributary of the Tobacco River, which flows into the Tittabawassee River in the southeast corner of the township. Portions of the Edenville Dam and Wixom Lake were within the township until the dam collapsed in May 2020 and drained the lake along the Tittabawassee River.

=== Major highways ===
- M-18 runs south–north and forms most of the western boundary of the township before entering Beaverton.
- M-30 runs south–north and forms most of the eastern boundary of the township.

== Demographics ==
As of the census of 2000, there were 2,552 people, 1,029 households, and 776 families residing in the township. The population density was 75.0 inhabitants per square mile (29.0/km^{2}). There were 1,399 housing units at an average density of 41.1 per square mile (15.9/km^{2}). The racial makeup of the township was 98.98% White, 0.12% Native American, 0.24% Asian, 0.04% Pacific Islander, 0.04% from other races, and 0.59% from two or more races. Hispanic or Latino of any race were 1.45% of the population.

There were 1,029 households, out of which 27.8% had children under the age of 18 living with them, 66.8% were married couples living together, 5.6% had a female householder with no husband present, and 24.5% were non-families. 20.6% of all households were made up of individuals, and 8.9% had someone living alone who was 65 years of age or older. The average household size was 2.47 and the average family size was 2.85.

In the township the population was spread out, with 23.0% under the age of 18, 6.4% from 18 to 24, 26.3% from 25 to 44, 29.6% from 45 to 64, and 14.7% who were 65 years of age or older. The median age was 41 years. For every 100 females, there were 102.4 males. For every 100 females age 18 and over, there were 99.6 males.

The median income for a household in the township was $40,813, and the median income for a family was $47,539. Males had a median income of $39,934 versus $30,188 for females. The per capita income for the township was $20,037. About 7.5% of families and 8.7% of the population were below the poverty line, including 11.6% of those under age 18 and 1.0% of those age 65 or over.
