= Clement Township, Michigan =

- Civil township
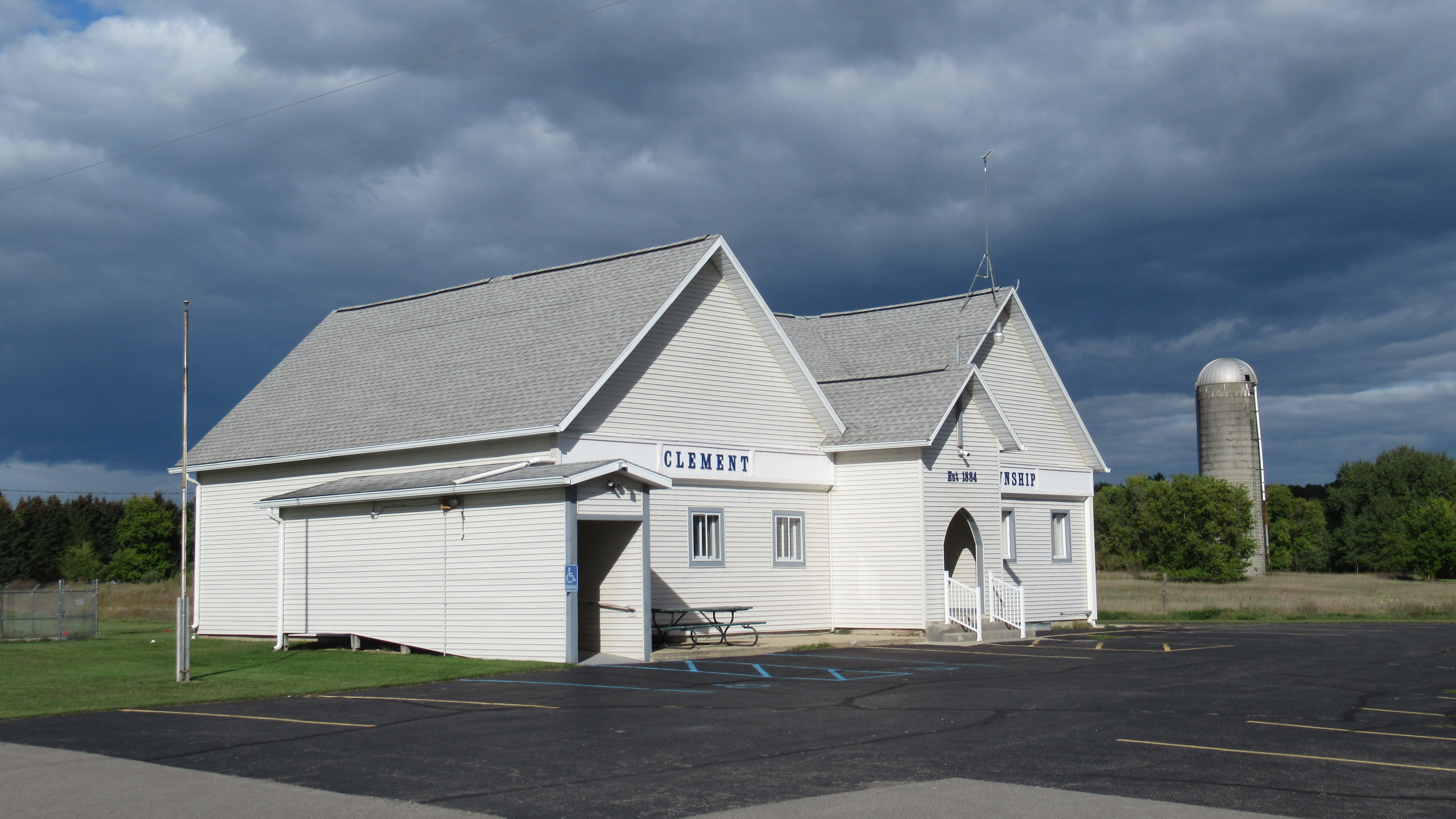
- Clement Township Hall

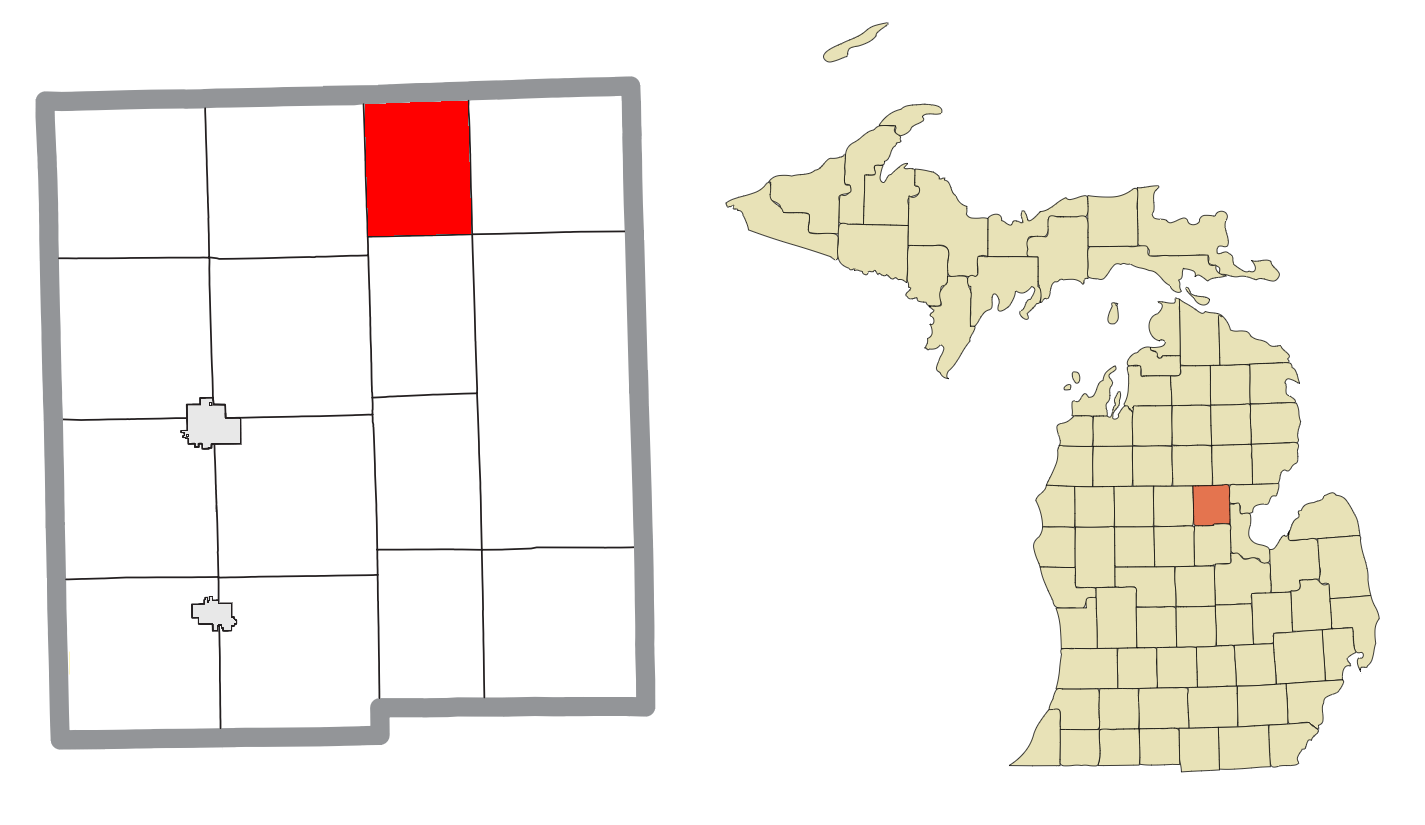
- Location within Gladwin County

- Location within the state of Michigan Location within the United States
- Coordinates: 44°6′19″N 84°19′59″W
- Country: United States
- State: Michigan
- County: Gladwin
- Established: 1884

Government
  - Supervisor: Karon Hoffman
  - Clerk: Eric House

Area
  - Total: 20.85 sq mi (54.00 km^{2})
  - Land: 20.04 sq mi (51.90 km^{2})
  - Water: 0.81 sq mi (2.10 km^{2})
- Elevation: 774 ft (236 m)

Population (2020)
  - Total: 892
  - Density: 44.5/sq mi (17.2/km^{2})
- Time zone: UTC-5 (Eastern (EST))
  - Summer (DST): UTC-4 (EDT)
- ZIP code(s): 48610 (Alger); 48624 (Gladwin)
- Area code: 989
- FIPS code: 26-16360
- GNIS feature ID: 1626095
- Website: Official website

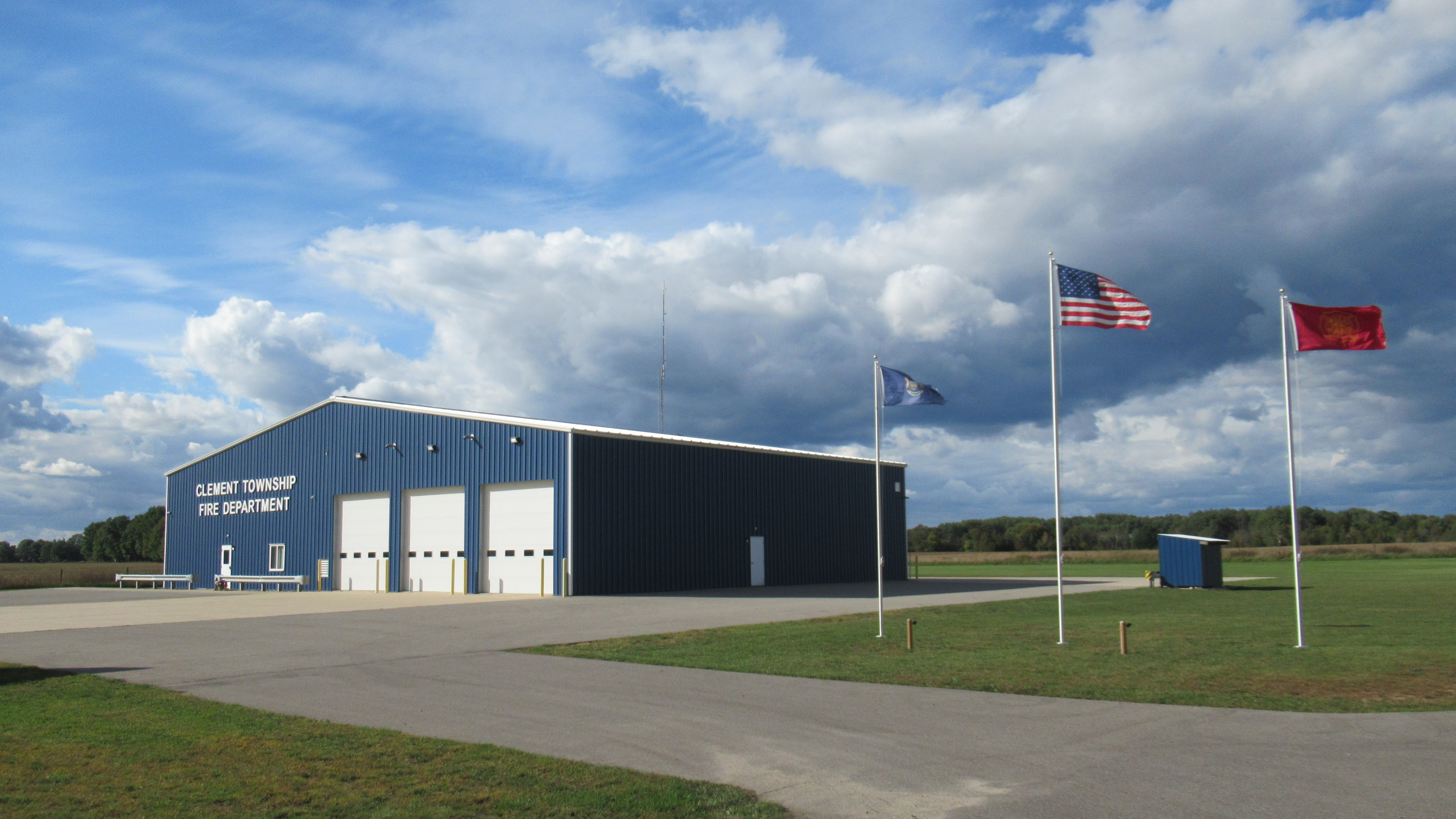
Clement Township Fire Department

Clement Township is a civil township of Gladwin County in the U.S. state of Michigan. The population was 892 at the 2020 census.

== Geography ==
According to the U.S. Census Bureau, the township has a total area of 20.85 square miles (54.00 km^{2}), of which 20.04 square miles (51.90 km^{2}) is land and 0.81 square miles (2.10 km^{2}) (3.88%) is water.

The East and Middle Branch of the Tittabawassee River runs through the southeast corner of the township.

=== Major highways ===
- M-30 runs south–north and forms most of the western boundary before curving west–east and running through the north portion of the township.

== Demographics ==
As of the census of 2000, there were 994 people, 471 households, and 319 families residing in the township. The population density was 49.3 inhabitants per square mile (19.0/km^{2}). There were 1,186 housing units at an average density of 58.9 per square mile (22.7/km^{2}). The racial makeup of the township was 97.69% White, 0.10% African American, 0.70% Native American, 0.10% Asian, 0.40% from other races, and 1.01% from two or more races. Hispanic or Latino of any race were 0.60% of the population.

There were 471 households, out of which 15.7% had children under the age of 18 living with them, 61.4% were married couples living together, 5.1% had a female householder with no husband present, and 32.1% were non-families. 28.5% of all households were made up of individuals, and 14.0% had someone living alone who was 65 years of age or older. The average household size was 2.10 and the average family size was 2.53.

In the township the population was spread out, with 15.9% under the age of 18, 2.5% from 18 to 24, 18.8% from 25 to 44, 36.8% from 45 to 64, and 26.0% who were 65 years of age or older. The median age was 53 years. For every 100 females, there were 94.9 males. For every 100 females age 18 and over, there were 97.2 males.

The median income for a household in the township was $29,286, and the median income for a family was $33,173. Males had a median income of $28,333 versus $16,818 for females. The per capita income for the township was $18,329. About 9.3% of families and 13.7% of the population were below the poverty line, including 23.5% of those under age 18 and 6.6% of those age 65 or over.
