= M-30 (Michigan highway) =

State highway in Michigan, United States

M-30
- M-30 highlighted in red

Route information
- Maintained by MDOT
- Length: 65.465 mi (105.356 km)
- Existed: c. July 1, 1919–present
- NHS: None

Major junctions
- South end: M-46 near Merrill
- M-20 near Midland; US 10 at Sanford; M-61 at Wooden Shoe Village
- North end: BL I-75 / M-55 at West Branch

Location
- Country: United States
- State: Michigan
- Counties: Gratiot, Saginaw, Midland, Gladwin, Ogemaw

Highway system
- Michigan State Trunkline Highway System; Interstate; US; State; Byways
← M-29	→ US 31

M-30 is a state trunkline highway in the U.S. state of Michigan that runs in a north–south direction from M-46 near Merrill to M-55 in West Branch. The highway runs through rural parts of five counties in the Lower Peninsula. The southern end runs along the Michigan Meridian and parallel to the Tittabawassee River. The southern end of the highway has been truncated twice and re-extended twice back to its pre-1962 extent.

Prior to 1962, M-30's southern terminus was at the junction with M-46 in Merrill. Since then, the segment south of US Highway 10 (US 10) was returned to local control and decommissioned as a state highway. In May 2009, M-30 was extended southerly from US 10 to M-20, restoring some of the highway decommissioned in the 1960s to M-30. It was then extended back to M-46 in 2022.

== Route description ==
M-30 is a rural, two-lane highway. M-30 starts at an intersection with M-46 (Monroe Road/Gratiot Road) west of Merrill and follows Meridian Road on the Michigan Meridian, which is Gratiot–Saginaw county line. The road runs through farmland northward for about 14 miles (23 km) before crossing into Midland County. M-30 crosses the Pine River north of the community of Poseyville and then crosses the Chippewa River south of the intersection with M-20 (Isabella Road) outside of Midland. North of this intersection, the highway continues along the meridian through forest lands to a crossing of the Tittabawassee River near Sanford. M-30 passes through the community and crosses the US 10 freeway near the location where the latter crosses a narrow section of Sanford Lake. The road continues north running parallel to the lake along the meridian to a point near Edenville. There, the highway turns westerly along Curtis Road and then back northerly on Midland Road to a crossing of the Tittabawassee and Wixom Lake.

Past the river and lake crossings, M-30 angles to the northeast to return to the Michigan Meridian. The area adjacent to the lake is farm land, but continuing north, the highway returns to the woodlands of the Au Sable State Forest. M-30 intersects M-61 at Wooden Shoe Village near Smallwood Lake. The highway continues to parallel the Tittabawassee River, crossing several of its smaller tributaries, until a point south of the Gladwin–Ogemaw County county line. The trunkline passes through a small unnamed, unincorporated community northwest of Hockaday near Indian and Elk lakes as the road turns to the northeast between the lakes in the area. M-30 crosses the county line near Edwards and continues northward. The highway turns to the northeast as it approaches West Branch, crossing under Interstate 75 (I-75) without an interchange. M-30 ends at Business Loop I-75/M-55 on the west side of West Branch.

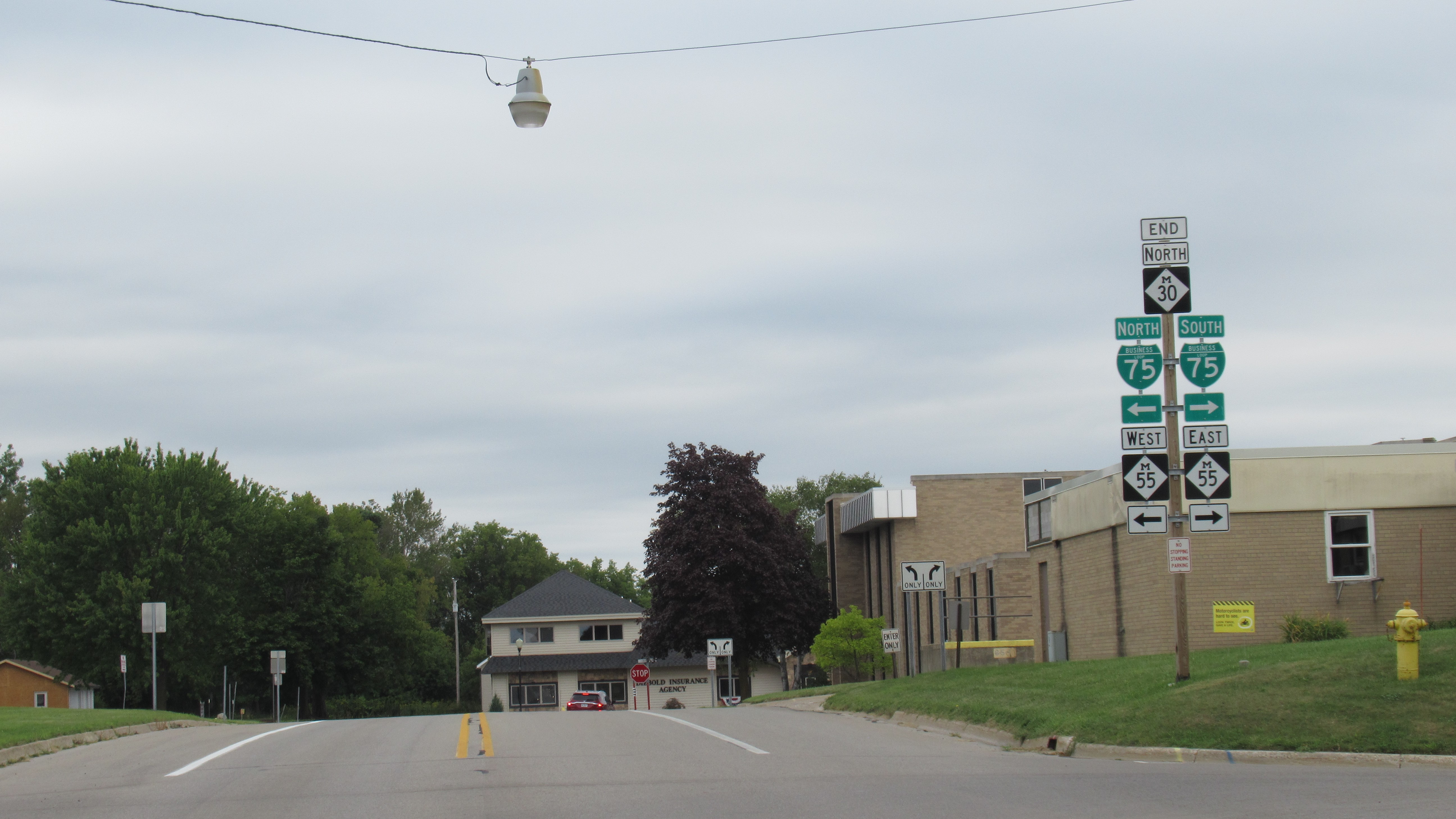
Northern terminus at BL I-75/M-55 in West Branch

The Michigan Department of Transportation (MDOT) maintains M-30 like all other parts of the state trunkline highway system. As a part of these responsibilities, the department tracks the volume of traffic. For 2021, the highest traffic levels were observed on the section north of US 10 at 8,279 vehicles on average per day. The lowest levels were the 3,082 vehicles between the immediately north of the I-75 crossing. The survey did not include the section south of M-20. No segment has been listed as part of the National Highway System, a network of roads important to the nation's economy, defense, and mobility.

== History ==
M-30 was first designated by July 1, 1919. The original routing only ran from Winegars to West Branch. South of Winegars, the roadway is a portion of M-18. An extension of M-18 in 1928 or 1929 south of Beaverton led to the redesignation and extension of M-30 south through Edenville and Sanford to end at M-46. M-30 was completely paved as the last 15 miles (24 km) of gravel roadway were completed between Sanford and the Midland–Saginaw county line in 1961. The next year, when M-30 was truncated to end at the US 10 freeway in Sanford, the remaining portion south of US 10 was turned over to county control.

On May 13, 2009, the Midland County Road Commission (MCRC) and MDOT signed a memorandum of understanding that transferred control of Meridian Road south of US 10 to M-20 from the MCRC to MDOT. The roadway transferred included a newly constructed bridge over the Tittabawassee River and other segments of roadway rebuilt by the MCRC. On May 20, 2020, the bridge carrying M-30 over Wixom Lake collapsed after two dams on the Tittabawassee River failed, leading to severe flooding. A temporary bridge opened at the site in March 2021; this span was set to be replaced in 2024. In September 2022, the Saginaw County Road Commission transferred jurisdiction over Meridian Road to MDOT from M-46 north to the Midland County line. The next month, the MCRC transferred control of Meridian Road from the county line north to M-20. The extension was marked on the 2023 MDOT maps.

On October 7, 2024, the bridge over the Tobacco River opened to traffic.

== Major intersections ==
County	Location	mi	km	Destinations	Notes
Gratiot–Saginaw county line	Wheeler–Jonesfield township line	0.000	0.000	M-46 (Monroe Road/Gratiot Road) – Alma, Saginaw	
Midland	Lee–Homer township line	14.112	22.711	M-20 (Isabella Road) – Mount Pleasant, Midland	
Midland	Sanford	19.047– 19.063	30.653– 30.679	US 10 – Clare, Midland	Exit 116 on US 10
Gladwin	Tobacco Township	24.276– 24.49	39.068– 39.41	Edenville Causeway over Wixom Lake (Note: Bridge collapsed on May 19, 2020, from flooding related to dam collapses on the Tittabawasee River. A temporary bridge opened in March 2021.)	
Gladwin	Wooden Shoe Village	40.623	65.376	M-61 – Gladwin, Standish	
Ogemaw	Edwards Township	58.313	93.846	F-18 (Greenwood Road)	
Ogemaw	West Branch	65.465	105.356	BL I-75 / M-55 (Houghton Avenue) – Houghton Lake, Tawas City	
1.000 mi = 1.609 km; 1.000 km = 0.621 mi
