= Hay Township, Michigan =

- Civil township
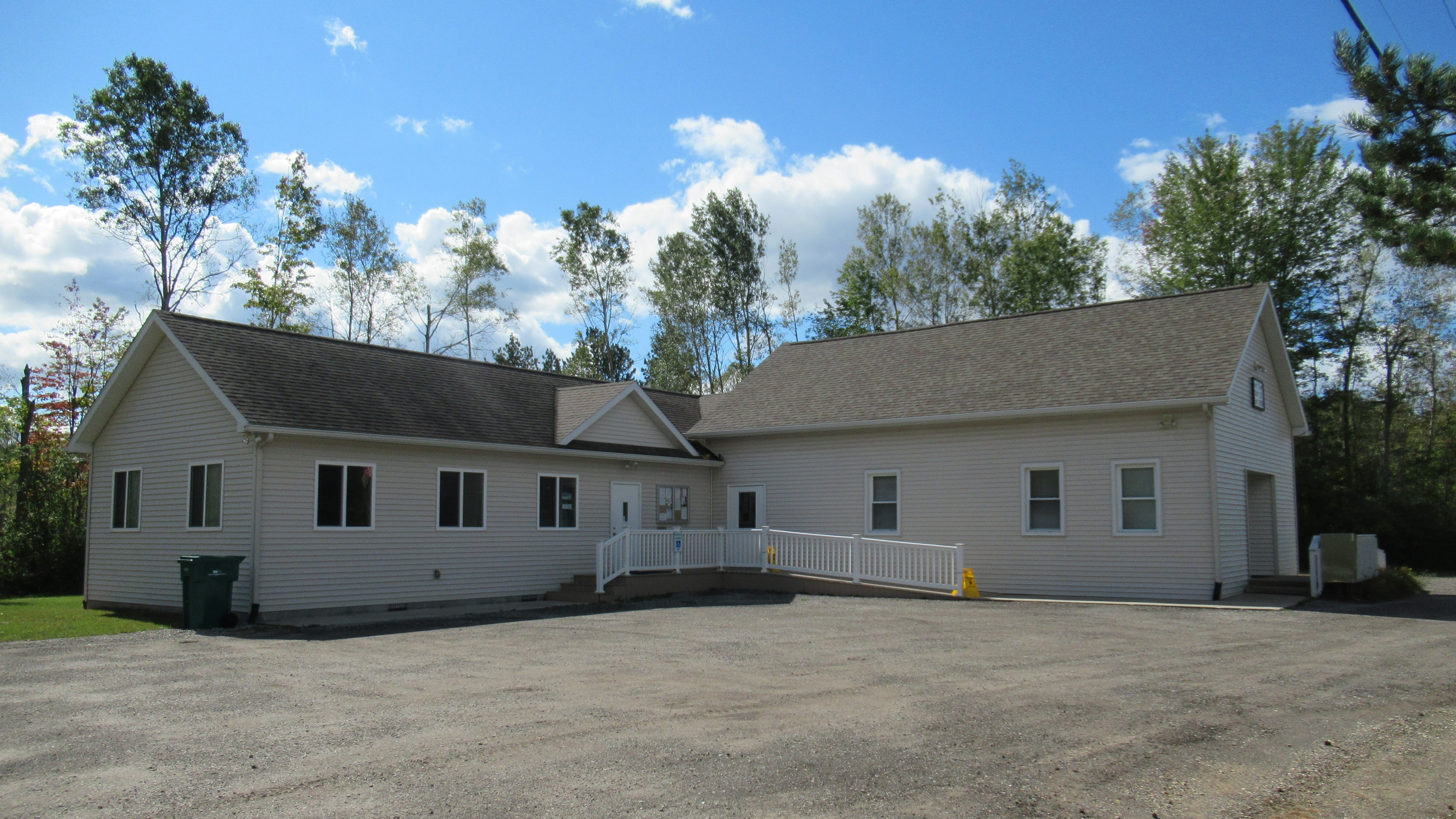
- Hay Township Hall

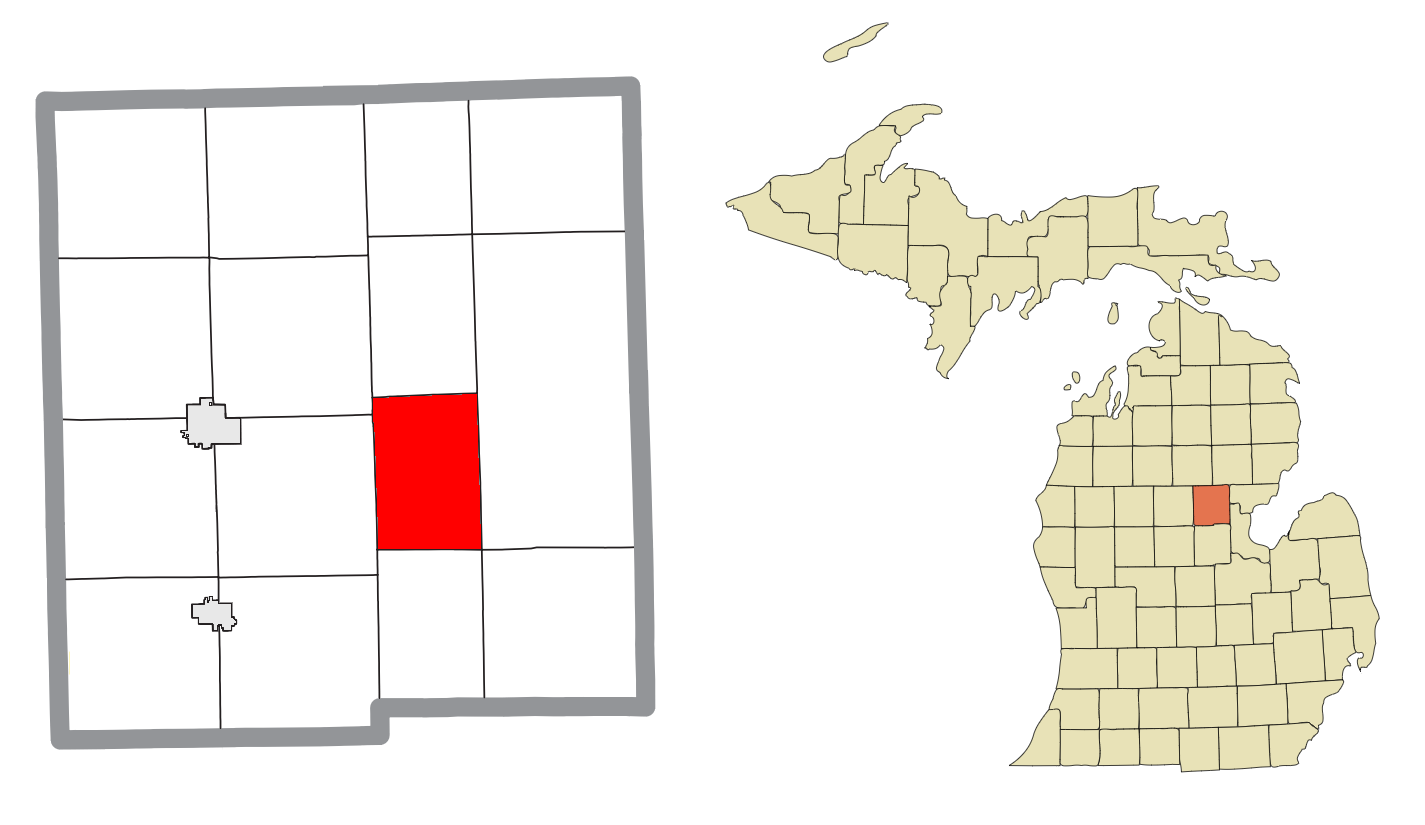
- Location within Gladwin County

- Location within the state of Michigan Location within the United States
- Coordinates: 43°57′53″N 84°19′58″W
- Country: United States
- State: Michigan
- County: Gladwin
- Established: 1908

Government
  - Supervisor: Mark Mudge
  - Clerk: Sandra Priemer

Area
  - Total: 22.69 sq mi (58.77 km^{2})
  - Land: 21.45 sq mi (55.56 km^{2})
  - Water: 1.24 sq mi (3.21 km^{2})
- Elevation: 696 ft (212 m)

Population (2020)
  - Total: 1,279
  - Density: 59.62/sq mi (23.02/km^{2})
- Time zone: UTC-5 (Eastern (EST))
  - Summer (DST): UTC-4 (EDT)
- ZIP code(s): 48612 (Beaverton); 48624 (Gladwin)
- Area code: 989
- FIPS code: 26-37300
- GNIS feature ID: 1626452
- Website: Official website

Hay Township is a civil township of Gladwin County in the U.S. state of Michigan. The population was 1,279 at the 2020 census.

== Communities ==
- White Star is an unincorporated community in the township at the junction of M-61 and M-30 on the west side of the Tittabawassee River at 43°58′50″N 84°21′57″W.
- Winegars is an unincorporated community in the township on M-30 at 43°56′41″N 84°21′57″W.
- Wooden Shoe Village is an unincorporated community in the township on M-61 on the east side of the Tittawabassee at 43°58′44″N 84°21′22″W.

== Geography ==
According to the U.S. Census Bureau, the township has a total area of 22.69 square miles (58.77 km^{2}), of which 21.45 square miles (55.56 km^{2}) is land and 1.24 square miles (3.21 km^{2}) (5.46%) is water.

The Tittabawassee River flows south through the center of the township.

=== Major highways ===
- M-30 runs south–north and forms most of the western boundary of the township.
- M-61 runs west–east in the northern portion of the township.

== Demographics ==
As of the census of 2000, there were 1,402 people, 601 households, and 403 families residing in the township. The population density was 63.0 inhabitants per square mile (24.3/km^{2}). There were 1,321 housing units at an average density of 59.4 per square mile (22.9/km^{2}). The racial makeup of the township was 97.57% White, 1.21% Native American, 0.07% Asian, 0.14% from other races, and 1.00% from two or more races. Hispanic or Latino of any race were 1.00% of the population.

There were 601 households, out of which 23.0% had children under the age of 18 living with them, 55.4% were married couples living together, 7.8% had a female householder with no husband present, and 32.8% were non-families. 26.0% of all households were made up of individuals, and 11.3% had someone living alone who was 65 years of age or older. The average household size was 2.33 and the average family size was 2.79.

In the township the population was spread out, with 21.8% under the age of 18, 5.3% from 18 to 24, 23.5% from 25 to 44, 29.3% from 45 to 64, and 20.1% who were 65 years of age or older. The median age was 44 years. For every 100 females, there were 98.3 males. For every 100 females age 18 and over, there were 96.1 males.

The median income for a household in the township was $24,444, and the median income for a family was $32,574. Males had a median income of $30,795 versus $19,643 for females. The per capita income for the township was $13,322. About 14.6% of families and 19.1% of the population were below the poverty line, including 20.9% of those under age 18 and 17.4% of those age 65 or over.

== Images ==
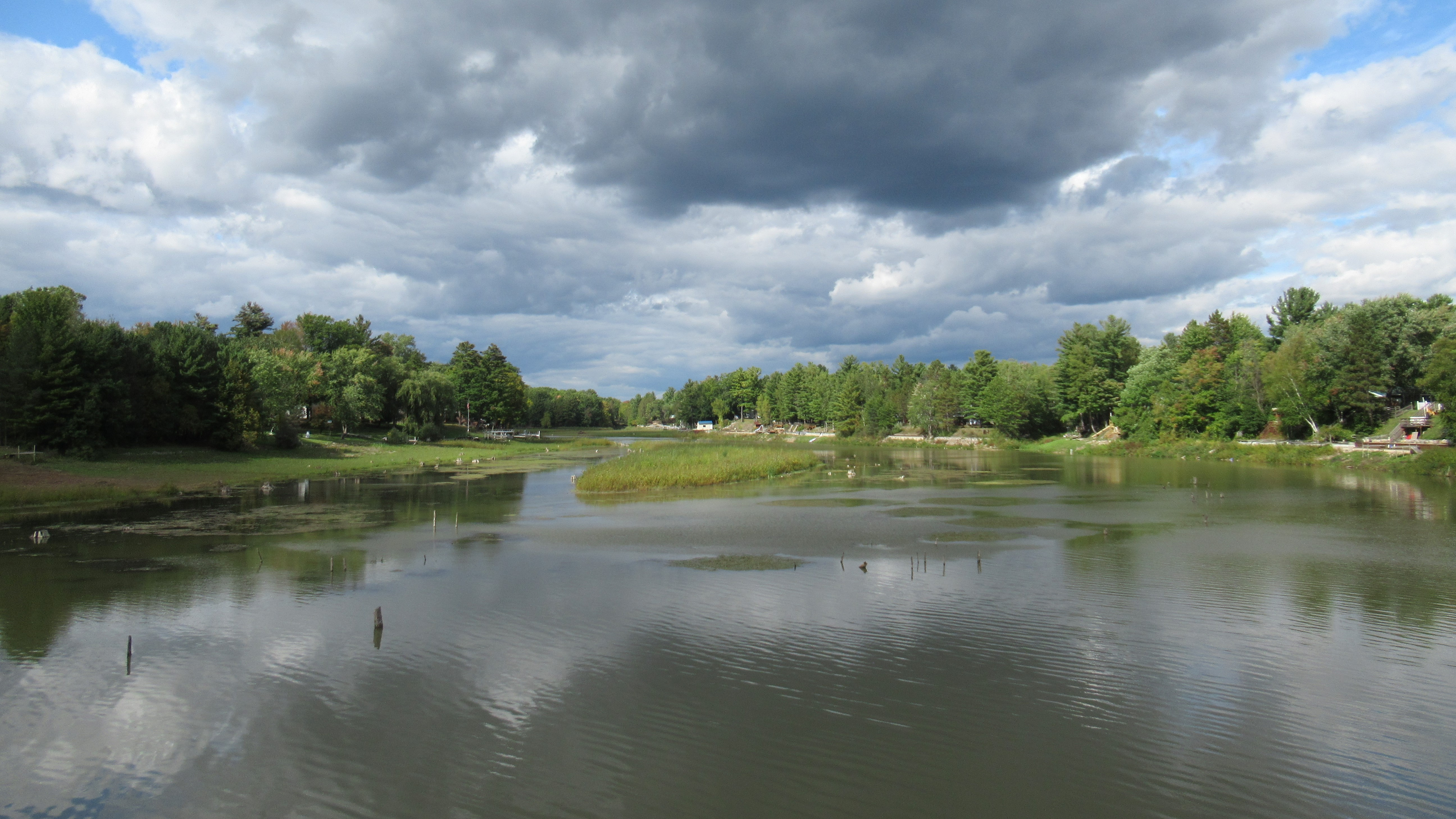
Tittabawassee River at M-61

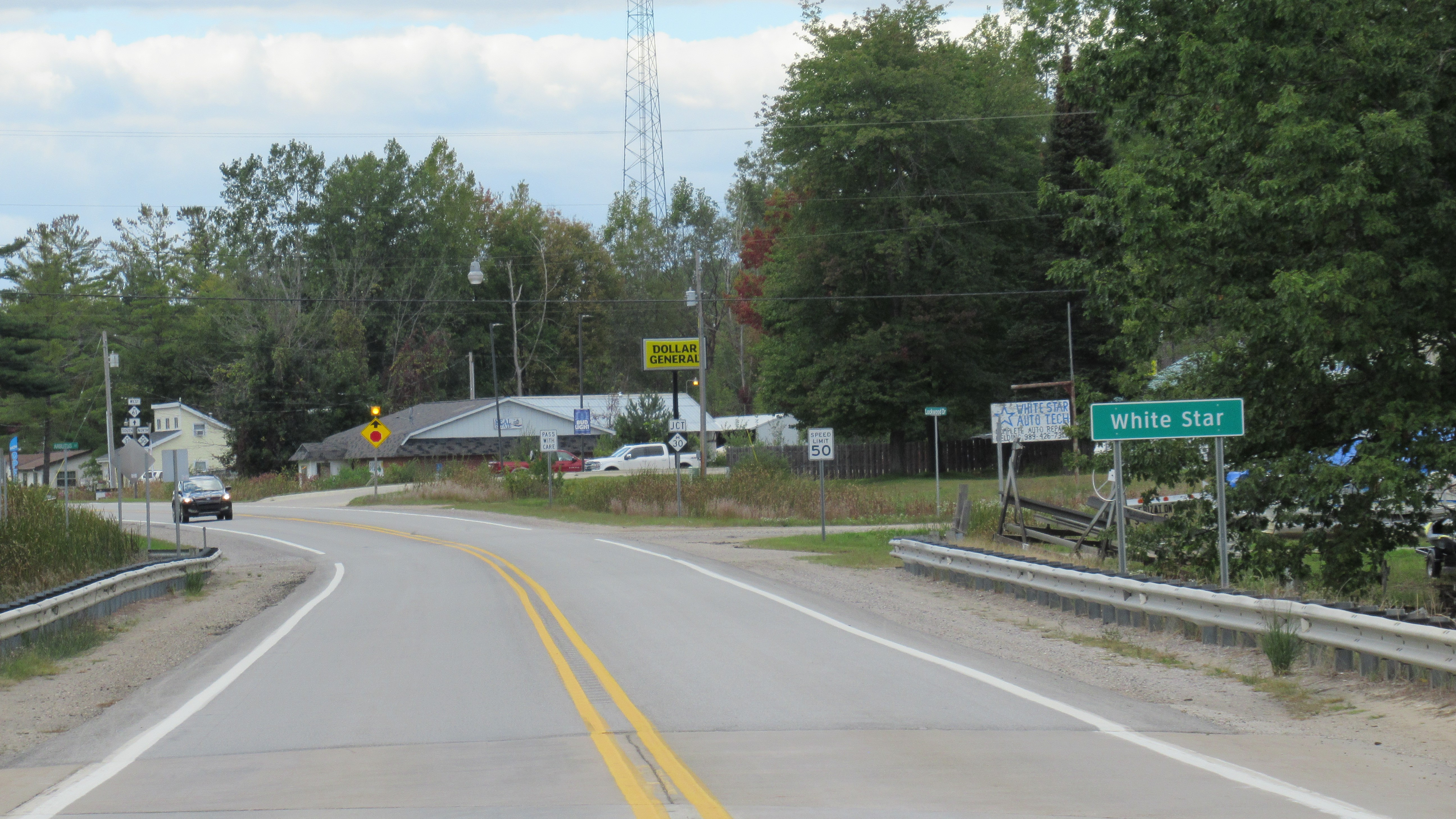
Community of White Star

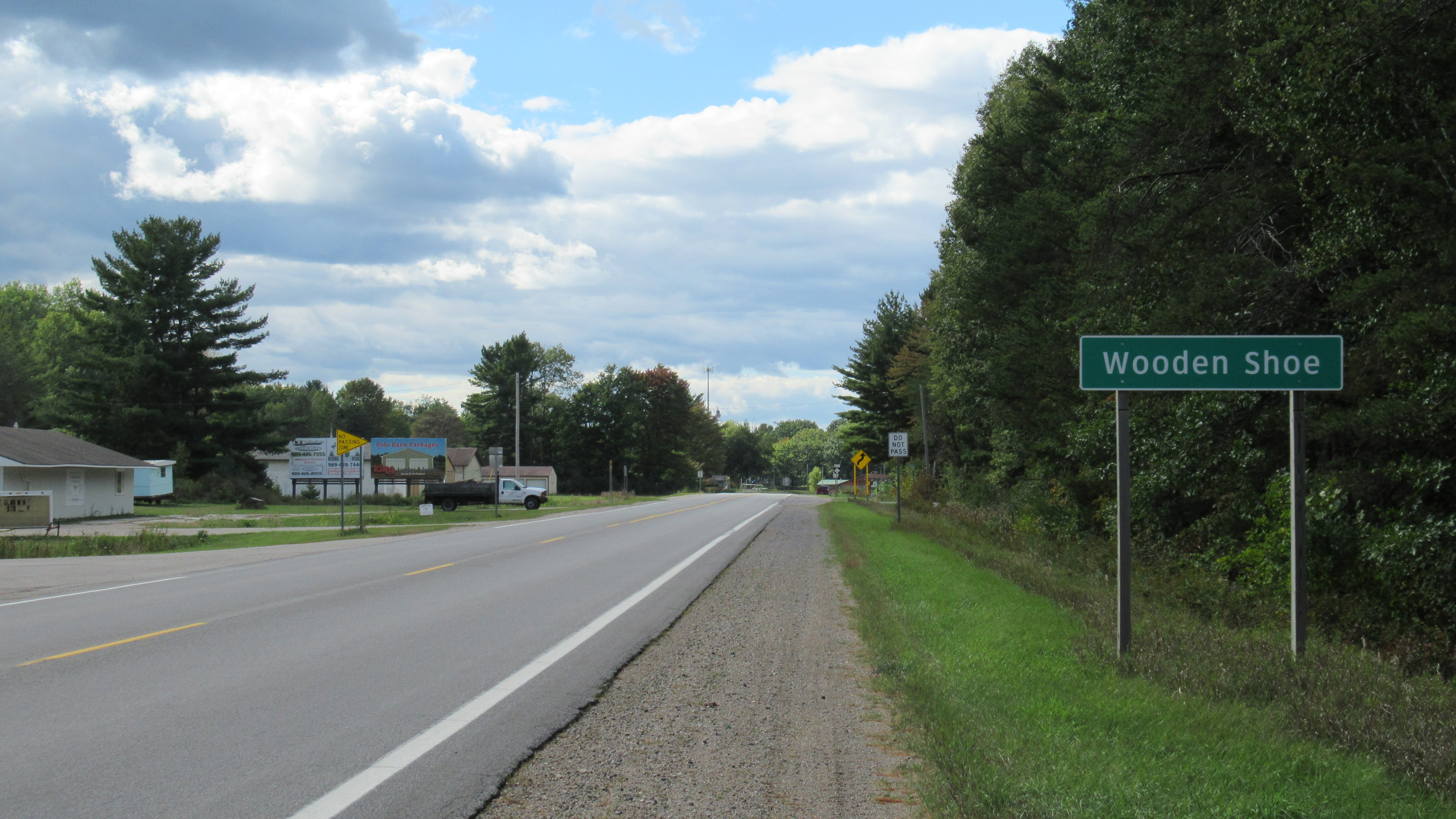
Community of Wooden Shoe
