= Wheeler Township, Michigan =

- Civil township
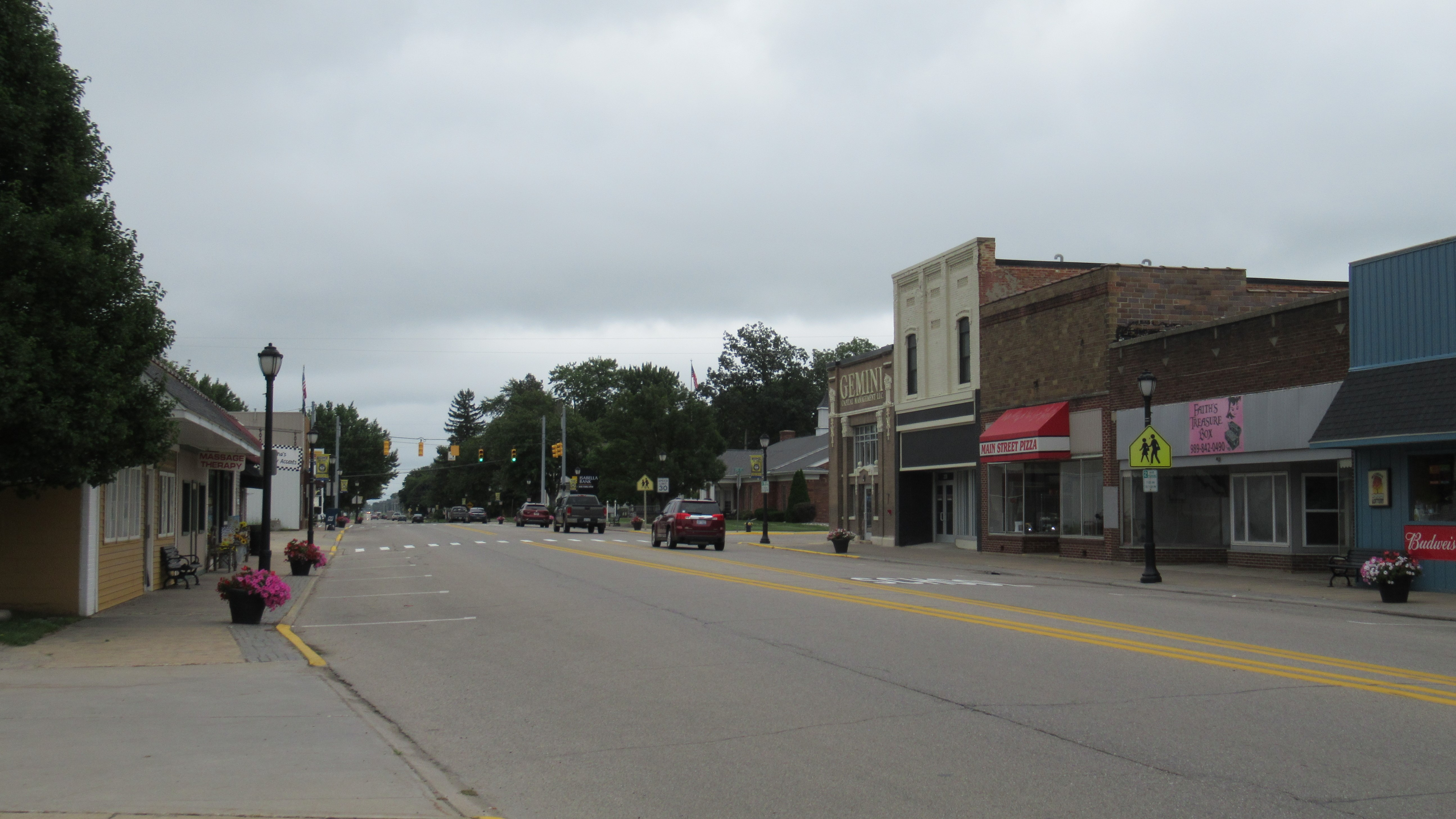
- The village of Breckenridge along M-46

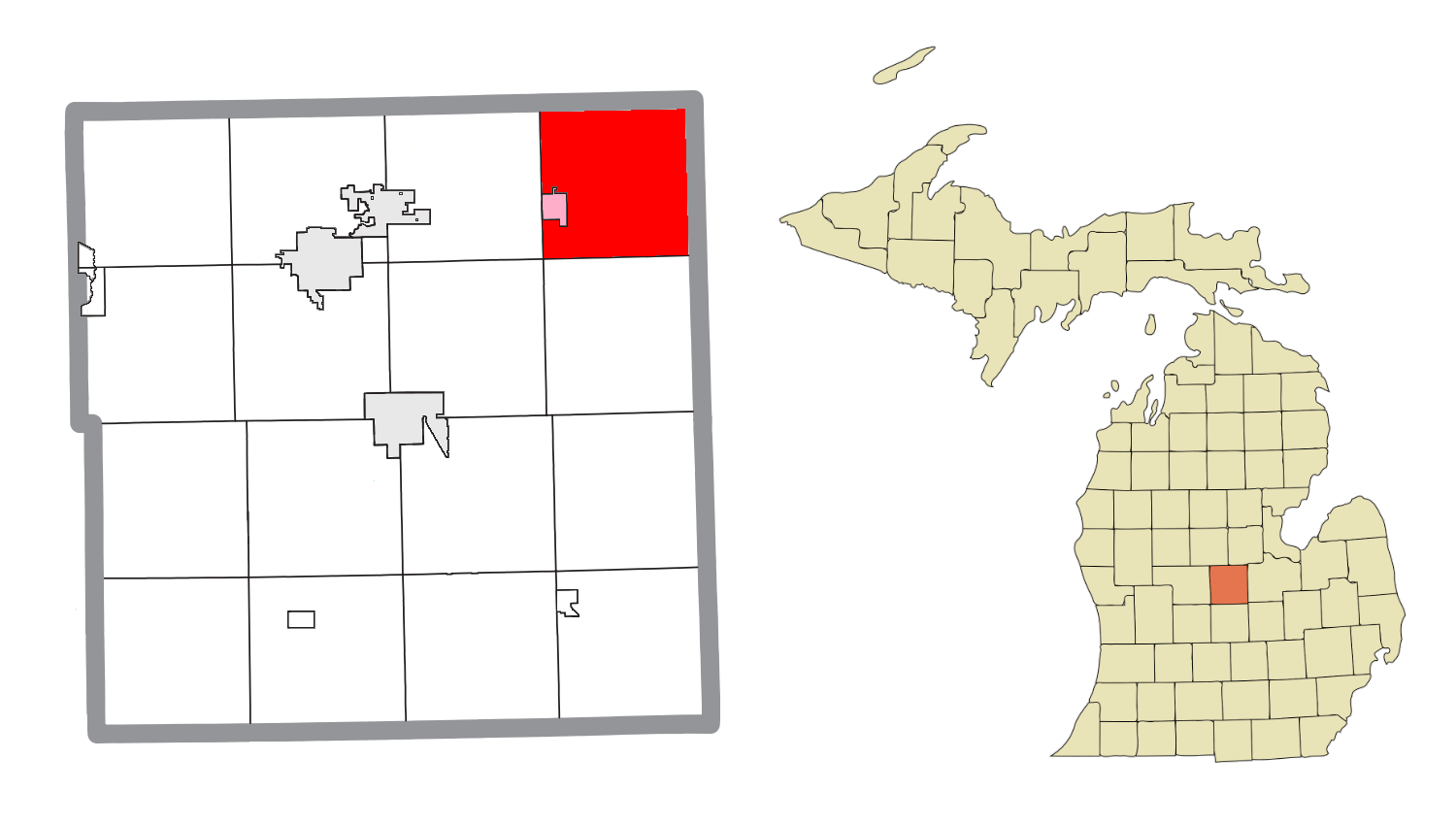
- Location within Gratiot County (red) and the administered village of Breckenridge (pink)

- Location within the state of Michigan Location within the United States
- Coordinates: 43°24′47″N 84°26′38″W
- Country: United States
- State: Michigan
- County: Gratiot

Area
  - Total: 35.8 sq mi (92.8 km^{2})
  - Land: 35.8 sq mi (92.8 km^{2})
  - Water: 0 sq mi (0.0 km^{2})
- Elevation: 712 ft (217 m)

Population (2020)
  - Total: 2,612
  - Density: 72.9/sq mi (28.1/km^{2})
- Time zone: UTC-5 (Eastern (EST))
  - Summer (DST): UTC-4 (EDT)
- ZIP code: 48662
- Area code: 989
- FIPS code: 26-86620
- GNIS feature ID: 1627258
- Website: https://wheelertwp.com/

Wheeler Township is a civil township of Gratiot County in the U.S. state of Michigan. As of the 2020 census, the township population was 2,612. Inside the township is the Village of Breckenridge.

== Communities ==
- The village of Breckenridge is within the township.
- Wheeler is an unincorporated community in the township at 43°24′46″N 84°26′16″W, about two miles east of Breckenridge on M-46. The FIPS place code is 86600.

== Geography ==
According to the United States Census Bureau, the township has a total area of 35.8 square miles (93 km^{2}), all land.

=== Major highways ===
- M-30 is a north–south route that forms the eastern boundary of the township.
- M-46 serves as an east–west thoroughfare within the township.

== Demographics ==
As of the census of 2000, there were 2,785 people, 1,078 households, and 783 families residing in the township. The population density was 77.7 inhabitants per square mile (30.0/km^{2}). There were 1,147 housing units at an average density of 32.0 per square mile (12.4/km^{2}). The racial makeup of the township was 96.09% White, 0.04% African American, 0.07% Native American, 0.11% Asian, 0.04% Pacific Islander, 2.51% from other races, and 1.15% from two or more races. Hispanic or Latino of any race were 5.49% of the population.

There were 1,078 households, out of which 34.6% had children under the age of 18 living with them, 58.6% were married couples living together, 10.2% had a female householder with no husband present, and 27.3% were non-families. 24.3% of all households were made up of individuals, and 11.5% had someone living alone who was 65 years of age or older. The average household size was 2.58 and the average family size was 3.06.

In the township the population was spread out, with 27.4% under the age of 18, 9.0% from 18 to 24, 27.8% from 25 to 44, 23.6% from 45 to 64, and 12.2% who were 65 years of age or older. The median age was 36 years. For every 100 females, there were 99.5 males. For every 100 females age 18 and over, there were 93.7 males.

The median income for a household in the township was $35,688, and the median income for a family was $39,865. Males had a median income of $31,767 versus $25,813 for females. The per capita income for the township was $16,006. About 7.5% of families and 7.2% of the population were below the poverty line, including 7.6% of those under age 18 and 11.9% of those age 65 or over.
