= Edwards Township, Michigan =

- Civil township
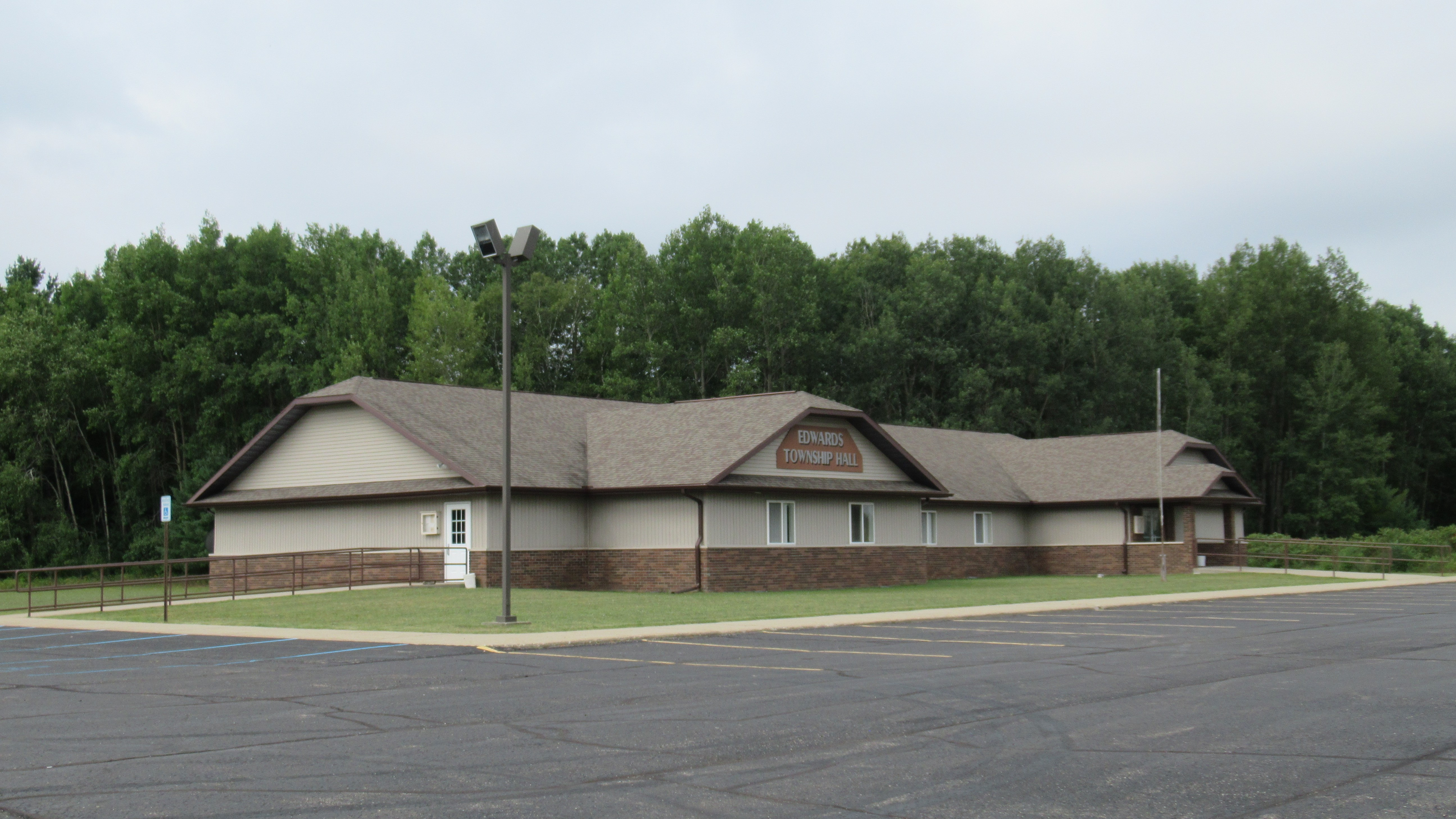
- Edwards Township Hall

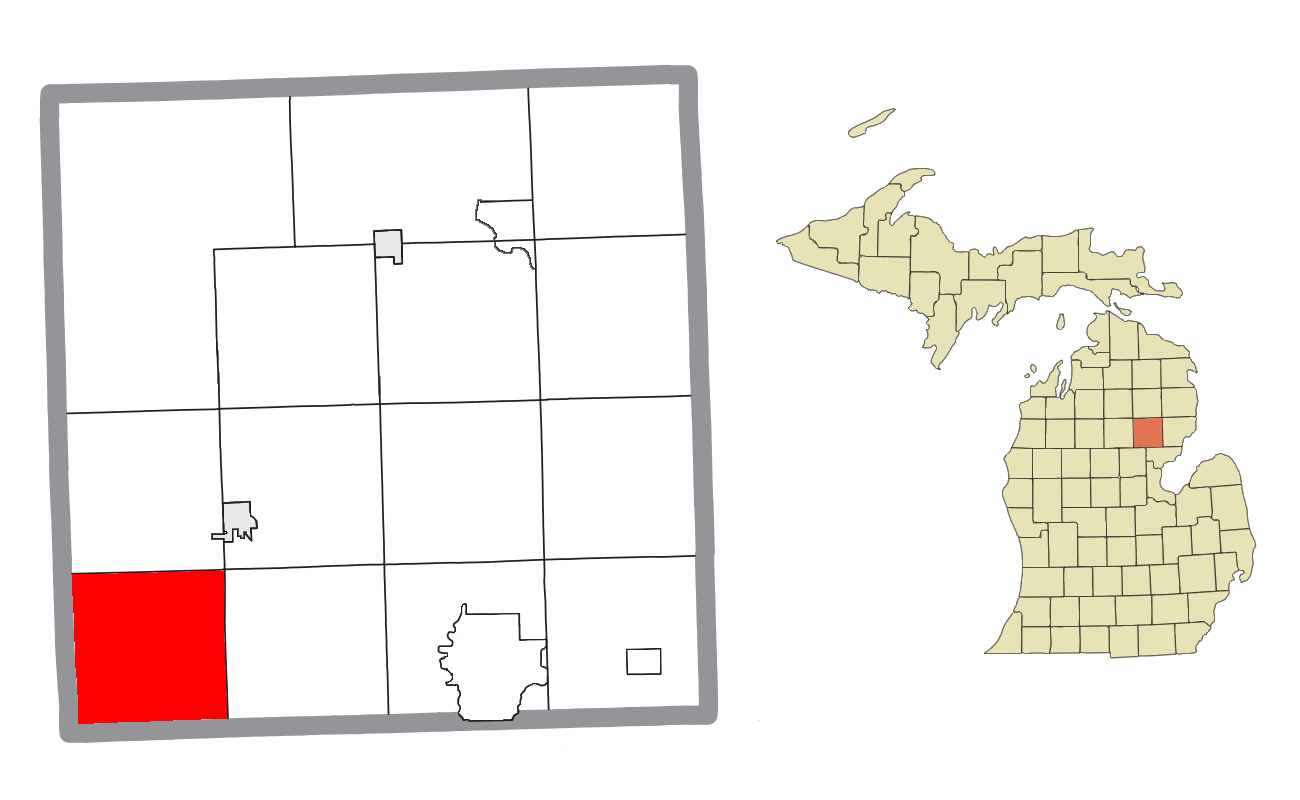
- Location within Ogemaw County

- Location within the state of Michigan Location within the United States
- Coordinates: 44°11′35″N 84°17′38″W
- Country: United States
- State: Michigan
- County: Ogemaw

Government
  - Supervisor: Robert Kowalski
  - Clerk: Korey Kripli

Area
  - Total: 35.68 sq mi (92.41 km^{2})
  - Land: 34.93 sq mi (90.47 km^{2})
  - Water: 0.75 sq mi (1.94 km^{2})
- Elevation: 909 ft (277 m)

Population (2020)
  - Total: 1,361
  - Density: 38.96/sq mi (15.04/km^{2})
- Time zone: UTC-5 (Eastern (EST))
  - Summer (DST): UTC-4 (EDT)
- ZIP code(s): 48610 (Alger); 48661 (West Branch)
- Area code: 989
- FIPS code: 26-25020
- GNIS feature ID: 1626219
- Website: https://edwardstwp.com/

Edwards Township is a civil township of Ogemaw County in the U.S. state of Michigan. The population was 1,361 at the 2020 census.

== Communities ==
- Edwards is a small unincorporated community in the southeast corner of the township along M-30 at 44°10′35″N 84°16′00″W. Edwards had its own post office from 1895–1914.

== Geography ==
According to the U.S. Census Bureau, the township has a total area of 35.68 square miles (92.41 km^{2}), of which 34.93 square miles (90.47 km^{2}) is land and 0.75 square miles (1.94 km^{2}) (2.10%) is water.

== Demographics ==
As of the census of 2000, there were 1,390 people, 533 households, and 400 families residing in the township. The population density was 39.7 inhabitants per square mile (15.3/km^{2}). There were 752 housing units at an average density of 21.5 per square mile (8.3/km^{2}). The racial makeup of the township was 98.71% White, 0.14% Native American, 0.36% Asian, and 0.79% from two or more races. Hispanic or Latino of any race were 0.72% of the population.

There were 533 households, out of which 33.8% had children under the age of 18 living with them, 64.0% were married couples living together, 7.5% had a female householder with no husband present, and 24.8% were non-families. 21.0% of all households were made up of individuals, and 10.3% had someone living alone who was 65 years of age or older. The average household size was 2.60 and the average family size was 3.00.

In the township the population was spread out, with 26.3% under the age of 18, 7.3% from 18 to 24, 25.3% from 25 to 44, 25.8% from 45 to 64, and 15.3% who were 65 years of age or older. The median age was 40 years. For every 100 females, there were 96.6 males. For every 100 females age 18 and over, there were 94.5 males.

The median income for a household in the township was $30,119, and the median income for a family was $41,042. Males had a median income of $31,607 versus $21,793 for females. The per capita income for the township was $15,031. About 9.2% of families and 12.3% of the population were below the poverty line, including 16.9% of those under age 18 and 6.1% of those age 65 or over.
