= Edenville Township, Michigan =

- Civil township
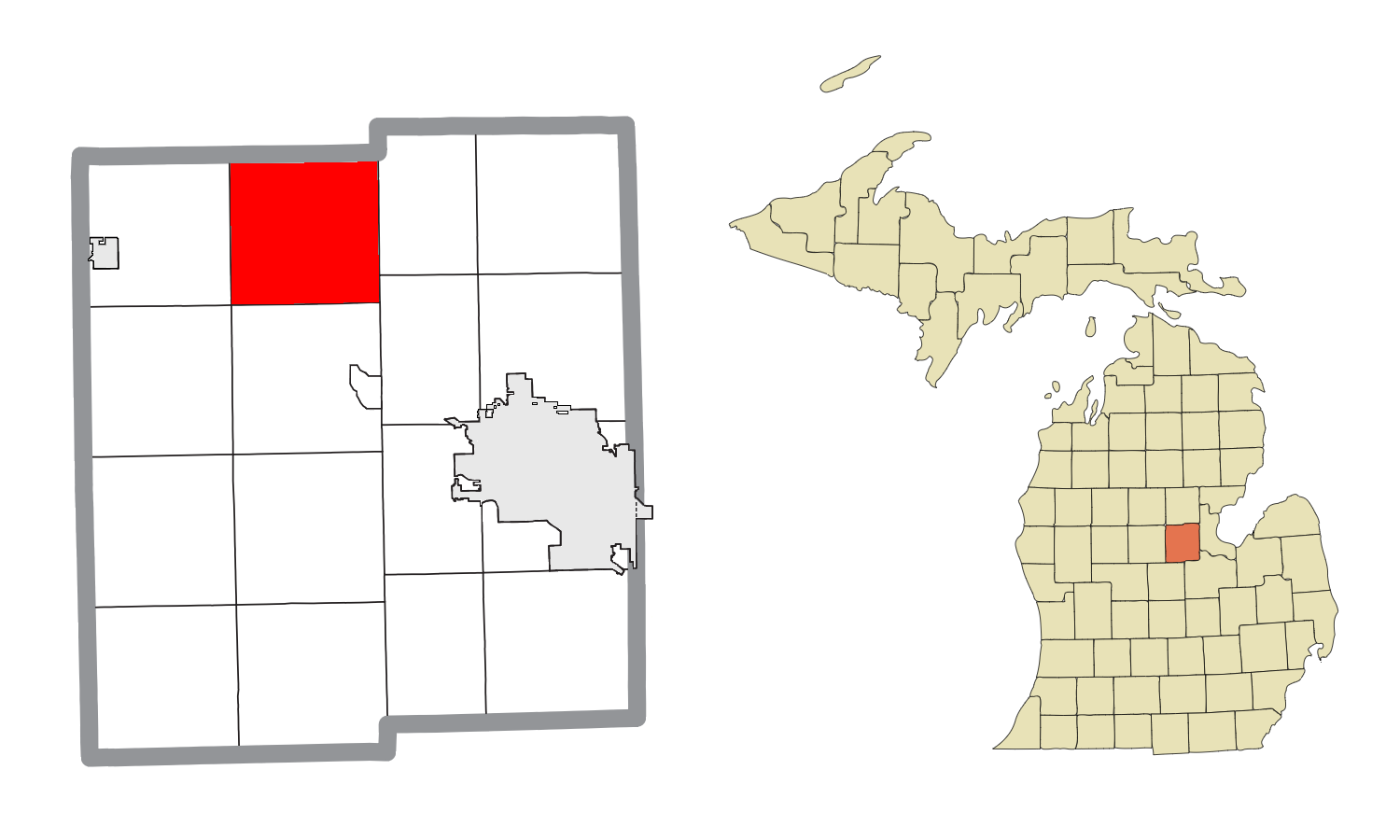
- Location within Midland County and the state of Michigan

- Location within Michigan Location within the United States
- Coordinates: 43°45′46″N 84°25′21″W
- Country: United States
- State: Michigan
- County: Midland
- Established: 1873

Government
  - Supervisor: Terrance Hall
  - Clerk: Anedra Lewis

Area
  - Total: 35.9 sq mi (93 km^{2})
  - Land: 34.8 sq mi (90 km^{2})
  - Water: 1.1 sq mi (2.8 km^{2})
- Elevation: 676 ft (206 m)

Population (2020)
  - Total: 2,493
  - Density: 71.6/sq mi (27.6/km^{2})
- Time zone: UTC-5 (Eastern (EST))
  - Summer (DST): UTC-4 (EDT)
- ZIP Codes: 48612 (Beaverton); 48618 (Coleman); 48620 (Edenville); 48628 (Hope); 48657 (Sanford)
- Area code: 989
- FIPS code: 26-111-24830
- GNIS feature ID: 1626218
- Website: www.edenvilletwp.org

Edenville Township is a civil township of Midland County in the U.S. state of Michigan. As of the 2020 census, the township population was 2,493.

The unincorporated community of Edenville is located in the northeast corner of the township at 43°47′58″N 84°22′54″W.

== Geography ==
The township is in northern Midland County, bordered to the north by Gladwin County. According to the U.S. Census Bureau, the township has a total area of 35.9 square miles (93 km^{2}), of which 34.8 square miles (90 km^{2}) are land and 1.1 square miles (2.8 km^{2}), or 3.04%, are water. The Tittabawassee River crosses the east side of the township from north to south.

== Demographics ==
Historical population
Census	Pop.	Note	%±
1880	419		—
1890	460		9.8%
1900	763		65.9%
1910	510		−33.2%
1920	467		−8.4%
1930	396		−15.2%
1940	519		31.1%
1950	485		−6.6%
1960	697		43.7%
1970	1,169		67.7%
1980	2,029		73.6%
1990	2,367		16.7%
2000	2,528		6.8%
2010	2,551		0.9%
2020	2,493		−2.3%
U.S. Decennial Census

As of the census of 2000, there were 2,528 people, 988 households, and 741 families residing in the township. The population density was 72.6 inhabitants per square mile (28.0/km^{2}). There were 1,172 housing units at an average density of 33.6 per square mile (13.0/km^{2}). The racial makeup of the township was 97.94% White, 0.04% African American, 0.51% Native American, 0.28% Asian, 0.24% from other races, and 0.99% from two or more races. Hispanic or Latino of any race were 0.55% of the population.

There were 988 households, out of which 30.2% had children under the age of 18 living with them, 64.2% were married couples living together, 6.1% had a female householder with no husband present, and 25.0% were non-families. 18.9% of all households were made up of individuals, and 5.2% had someone living alone who was 65 years of age or older. The average household size was 2.56 and the average family size was 2.91.

In the township the population was spread out, with 24.0% under the age of 18, 7.4% from 18 to 24, 29.5% from 25 to 44, 28.7% from 45 to 64, and 10.4% who were 65 years of age or older. The median age was 39 years. For every 100 females, there were 98.7 males. For every 100 females age 18 and over, there were 100.9 males.

The median income for a household in the township was $42,847, and the median income for a family was $46,118. Males had a median income of $42,100 versus $26,891 for females. The per capita income for the township was $20,470. About 6.8% of families and 8.1% of the population were below the poverty line, including 12.0% of those under age 18 and 4.8% of those age 65 or over.
