= Edanville, Missouri =

Extinct town in the U.S. state of Missouri

Coordinates: 37°35′36″N 92°02′55″W

Edanville is an extinct town in northern Texas County, in the U.S. state of Missouri. The GNIS classifies it as a populated place.

The site is on the west bank of the Big Piney River approximately three quarters of a mile south of the Texas-Pulaski county line.

A post office called Edanville was in operation from 1892 until 1926. The community most likely was so named on account of its eden-like setting.
