= Tobacco River (Tittabawassee River tributary) =

Coordinates: 43°48′10″N 84°23′14″W

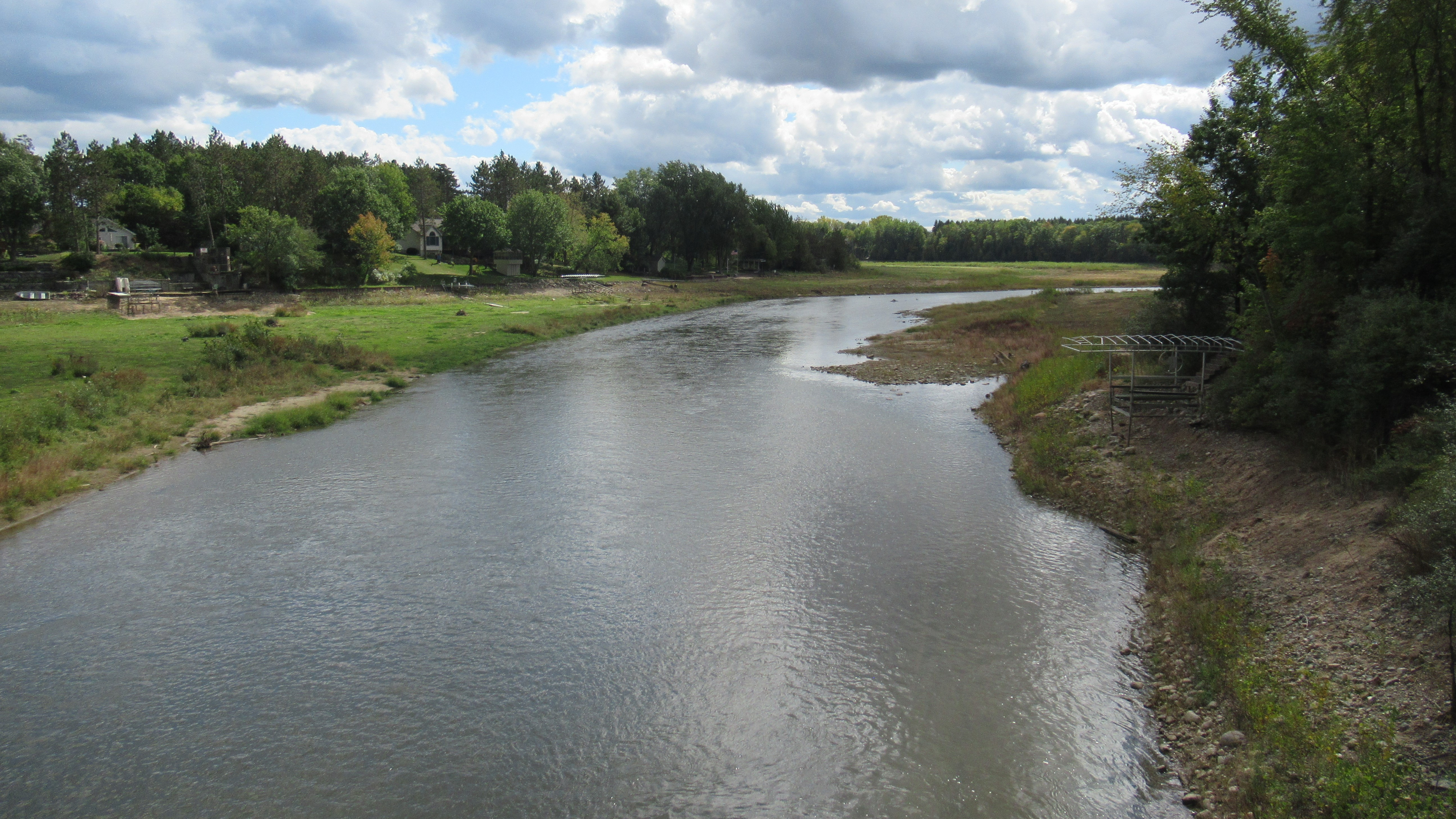
- The river along Dale Road in Tobacco Township

- Location within the state of Michigan

Location
- Country: United States

Physical characteristics
- Source
  - location: Michigan

The Tobacco River is a 12.7-mile-long (20.4 km) river in the U.S. state of Michigan. Located in Gladwin and Midland counties, the river rises in Beaverton at the confluence of the river's North, Middle, and South branches in Ross Lake. The river flows southeast and empties into the Tittabawassee River at the community of Edenville. On older maps, the South branch and the lower course of the Tobacco River are identified as Samaquasebing, Assemoqua, Assymoquoasibee, etc., all derived from the Ojibwe Asemaakwe-ziibi(ing), meaning "(At) Tobacco-woman River".
