= Wixom Lake =

Former reservoir in Michigan, United States

Coordinates: 43°49′25″N 84°21′44″W

Wixom Lake was a reservoir in the U.S. state of Michigan from 1925 to 2020. It was named after Frank Wixom, who was instrumental in building the Edenville Dam. Unusual for its size, Wixom Lake boasts a lighthouse on Musselman Island. From 2019 to 2020, an agreement to buy the dam and reservoir by the Four Lakes Task Force, a "county-delegated authority" under the State of Michigan, from Boyce Hydro L.L.C. was in place, However, in May 2020, the lake was destroyed when part of the earthen dam used to impound it collapsed. From 2018 to 2020, the impoundment was regulated by the Michigan Department of Environment, Great Lakes, and Energy (EGLE).

== Past features of Wixom Lake ==
The lake typically had a surface area of 1,980 acres (8.0 km^{2}), a shoreline of more than 84 miles (135 km), a maximum capacity of 66,200 acre-feet (81,700,000 m^{3}), a normal capacity of 36,000 acre-feet (44,000,000 m^{3}), and a maximum depth of 40 feet (12 m).

Normal Elevation, in feet, of Tittabawassee River reservoirs
Lake Name	Summer	Winter
Secord	750.8	747.8
Smallwood	704.8	701.8
Wixom	675.8	672.8
Sanford	630.8	627.8

Wixom Lake was the third in a series of four reservoirs along the Tittabawassee River, each controlled to a lower elevation during the winter flood control season and a higher elevation during the summer recreation season. In April 2020, Michigan's EGLE sued the dam's operator, alleging it had lowered Wixom Lake's water level without permission in 2018 and 2019, killing thousands of freshwater mussels.

== Incidents ==
=== 2018–2019 lake draining and lawsuits ===
The water level in the lake was lowered by its operator in 2018 and 2019. It said it had requested permission from Michigan's EGLE, which failed to issue it. Despite the lack of a permit, it said it lowered the water "due to concern for the safety of its operators and the downstream community", and it proceeded to sue EGLE in federal court on April 29, 2020.

The following day, EGLE countersued the dam's operator, alleging it had lowered Wixom Lake's water level without permission, killing thousands of freshwater mussels.

=== 2020 dam failure and destruction ===
In May 2020, during severe Tittabawasee River floods, a large earthen section of the Edenville Dam collapsed, requiring evacuations downstream, completely emptying the lake, and rerouting the river to a new course immediately downstream. Governor Gretchen Whitmer subsequently declared a state of emergency for Midland County. Requests to also aid Gladwin County residents is under review by governors staff.
