= Michigan meridian =

US survey line

Coordinates: 42°25′28″N 84°21′53″W

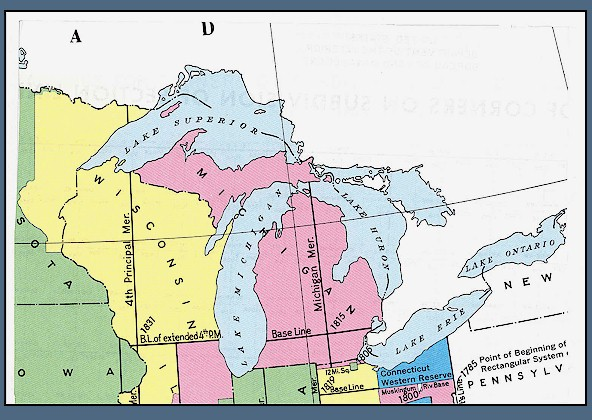
U.S. Bureau of Land Management map showing the principal meridians in Michigan and Wisconsin

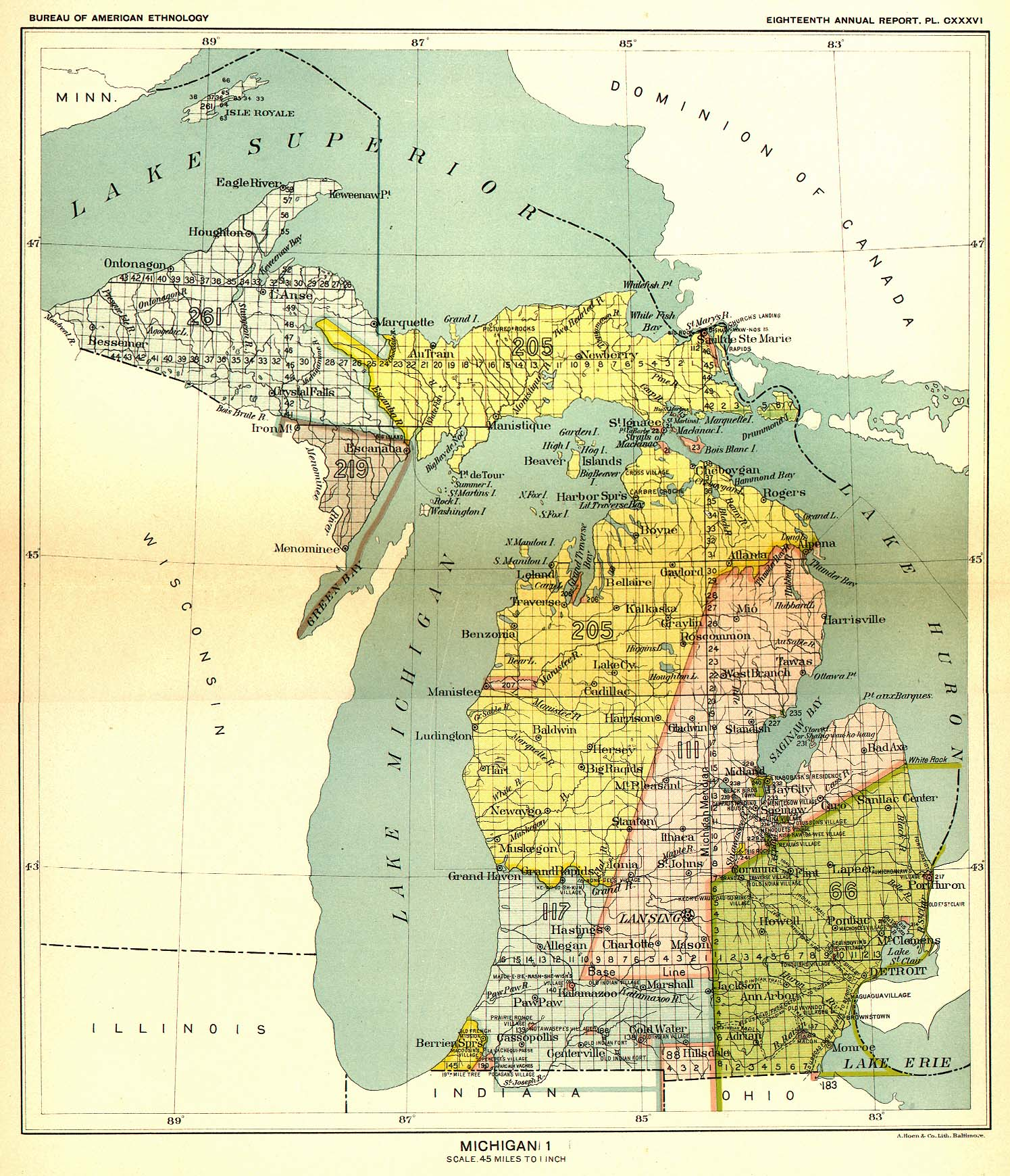
The Michigan meridian is clearly visible in the map of Native American land cessions in Michigan

The Michigan meridian is the principal meridian (or north–south line) used as a reference in the Michigan Survey, the survey of the U.S. state of Michigan in the early 19th century. It is located at 84 degrees, 21 minutes and 53 seconds west longitude. It forms the boundary between several counties in the state.

== History ==
The meridian was surveyed by Benjamin Hough in April 1815. The meridian was selected because it formed one of the principal boundary lines defined in the Treaty of Detroit in 1807, which was the first large cession of land by Native American peoples to the United States within the Michigan Territory. In that treaty, the boundary line was described as running due north from the mouth of the Auglaize River on the Maumee River, which was the site of Fort Defiance (now Defiance, Ohio).

Michigan's baseline, which today forms the northern border of Wayne, Washtenaw and other counties, was surveyed at the same time by Alexander Holmes, and intended to be exactly 78 miles (125.53 km) north of Fort Defiance. Although regulations governing the U.S. Public Land Survey System would later specify that the baseline should be a true parallel of latitude, this was not the case in earlier surveys, including the Michigan survey. Some roadways were laid out for both survey lines, but there was no intersecting of roadways coinciding with the intersecting of survey lines. Several segments of the Michigan Meridian correspond with a road bearing its namesake Meridian Road. A section of Meridian Road exists in Meridian Township and runs through most of Ingham and Clinton counties, but is not fully continuous due to marshy areas (formerly the Chandler Marsh, since developed and managed) and the Looking Glass River.

== Geography ==
The Michigan meridian forms the boundary between several counties in Michigan: Lenawee and Hillsdale; Shiawassee and Clinton; Saginaw and Gratiot; Ogemaw and Roscommon; Oscoda and Crawford; Montmorency and Otsego; and a portion of the boundary between Chippewa and Mackinac. U.S. Highway 127 approximately follows the meridian from the Ohio border into Jackson. In Okemos, there is a historical village of Meridian located on the line. Both it and Okemos are within Meridian Township, State highways M-30 in Midland and Gladwin counties, and M-129 in Chippewa and Mackinac counties are known as Meridian Road as well.

In the area of Ohio known as the Toledo Strip, the townships are numbered from the Michigan meridian and Michigan baseline because at the time they were surveyed, the area was considered to be a part of the Michigan Territory.

A 10-mile-wide (16 km) strip of land was given to Indiana when it became a state in 1816. Since this land had not been surveyed, the Indiana portion was surveyed with the rest of Indiana. However, in Michigan, the southernmost tier of townships are truncated. The townships were surveyed and sections numbered as if they were in whole townships, except that the southernmost survey townships were only 6 by 3 1/2 miles (9.7 km × 5.6 km) instead of the usual 6 by 6 miles (9.7 km × 9.7 km) square (36 sq mi or 93 km^{2}). Sections 19–24 in each township were chopped approximately in half, while sections 25–36 simply do not exist for these survey townships. To compensate for the smaller size, some of the civil townships formed from these survey townships were given additional sections of land from adjacent townships, as for example, White Pigeon Township in St. Joseph County and Three Oaks Township and New Buffalo Township in Berrien County. Some others of these smaller townships were merged into adjoining townships, as in Porter Township in Cass County. Similarly, many of the civil townships in Michigan along the Ohio border have somewhat more or less than the standard 36 square miles.

== See also ==
- List of principal and guide meridians and base lines of the United States
- Meridian-Baseline State Park
