= Tittabawassee River =

River in Michigan, United States

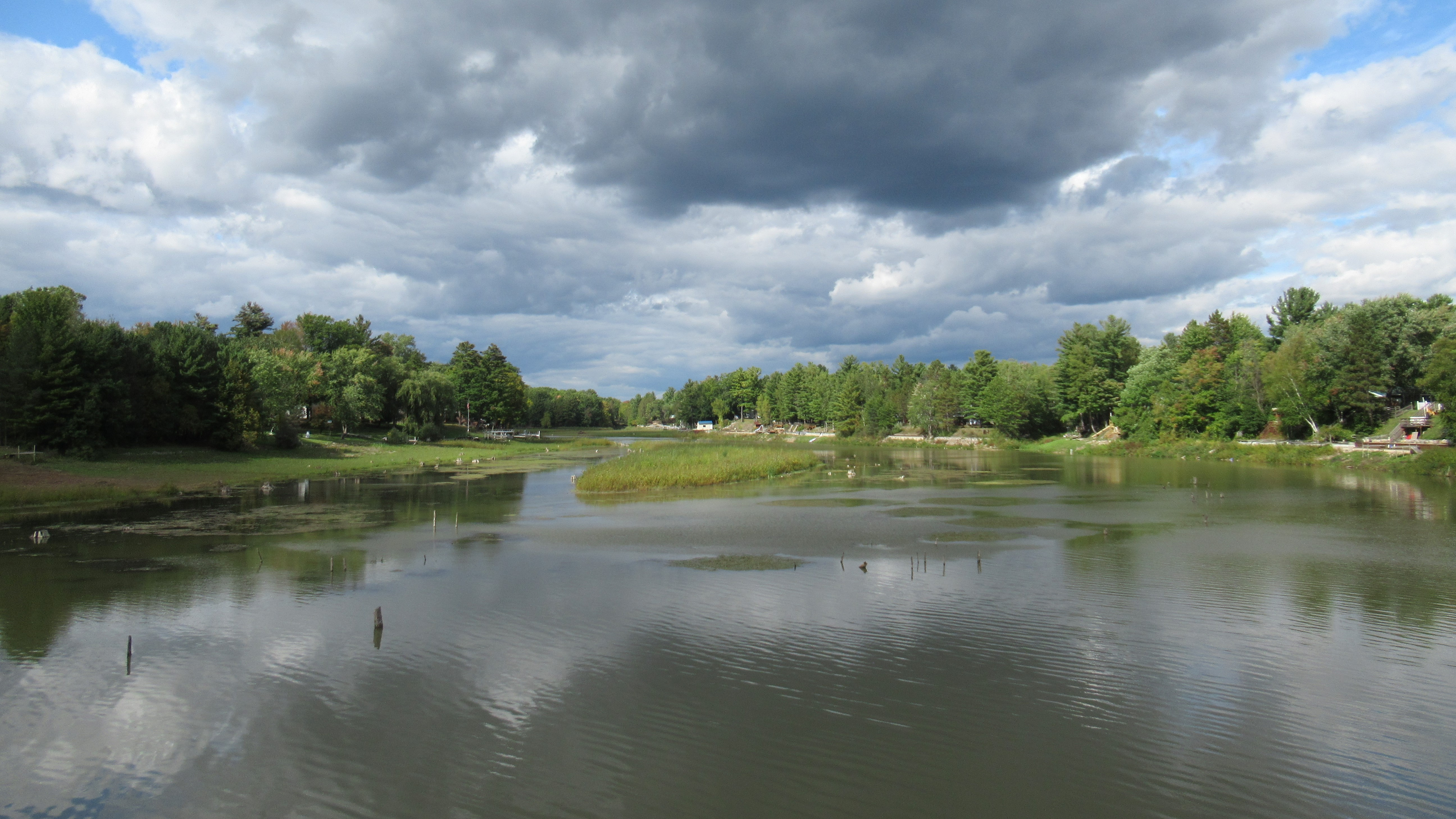
- Looking north from M-61 in Hay Township

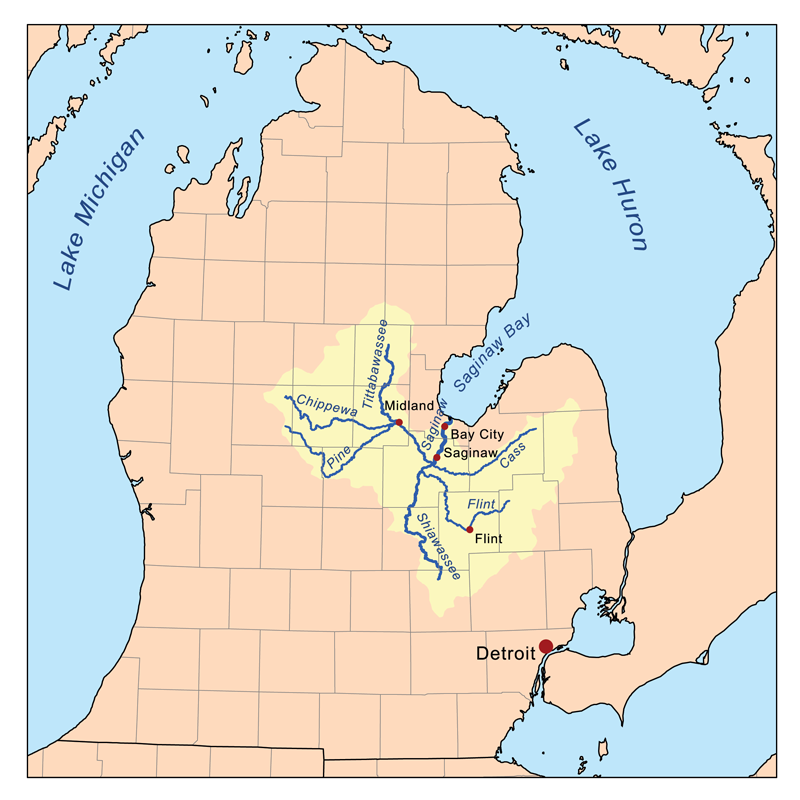
- Saginaw River watershed

- Mouth location within the state of Michigan

Physical characteristics
- Source
  - location: Edwards Township, Ogemaw County, Michigan
  - coordinates: 44.09085°N 84.31361°W
- Mouth
  - location: Saginaw River, Michigan
  - coordinates: 43.38669°N 83.96608°W
- Length: 72 mi (116 km)
- Basin size: 2,471 sq mi (6,400 km^{2})
- Discharge
  - location: mouth
  - average: 2,055.61 cu ft/s (58.208 m^{3}/s) (estimate)

The Tittabawassee River (/ˈtɪtəbəˈwɑːsi/ TIH-tə-bə-WAH-see) flows in a generally southeasterly direction through the Lower Peninsula of the U.S. state of Michigan. The name Tittabawassee likely comes from Ojibwe Ditib-Waasizo, meaning "rolling and sparkling river" from its curved shape and shining or sparkling water. The river begins at Secord Lake in Clement Township, at the confluence of the East Branch and the Middle Branch. From there it flows through Gladwin, Midland and Saginaw counties where, as a major tributary of the Saginaw River, it flows into it at Saginaw. Its tributaries include the Chippewa, Pine, Molasses, Sugar, and Tobacco rivers.

Significant communities on or near the Tittabawassee River include Saginaw, Midland, and Sanford. At Edenville, the river was impounded by the hydroelectric Edenville Dam to create Wixom Lake. It was also impounded by the Sanford hydroelectric dam in Sanford to create Sanford Lake prior to the dam failures and resulting flooding on May 19, 2020. In Saginaw County, the river flows through Tittabawassee Township, which is named for the river and contains the unincorporated community of Freeland.

The main river is 72.4 miles (116.5 km) long and drains an area of 2,471 square miles (6,400 km^{2}).

== Floods ==
On May 19, 2020, the Edenville Dam failed, followed by the Sanford Dam downstream being overtopped and a dike breaking at Poseyville, resulting in major flooding in Midland County. 10,000 people were evacuated including a seniors home and a few hospital patients. Two emergency shelters had to be relocated due to flooding and electrical power losses. Floodwater entered the Dow Chemical plant, forcing its shutdown and mixing with its containment ponds, leading to concern over pollution. The next day, water levels were predicted to reach 38 feet: four feet higher than the flood of 1986. National Guard units and a FEMA team were brought in to assist.

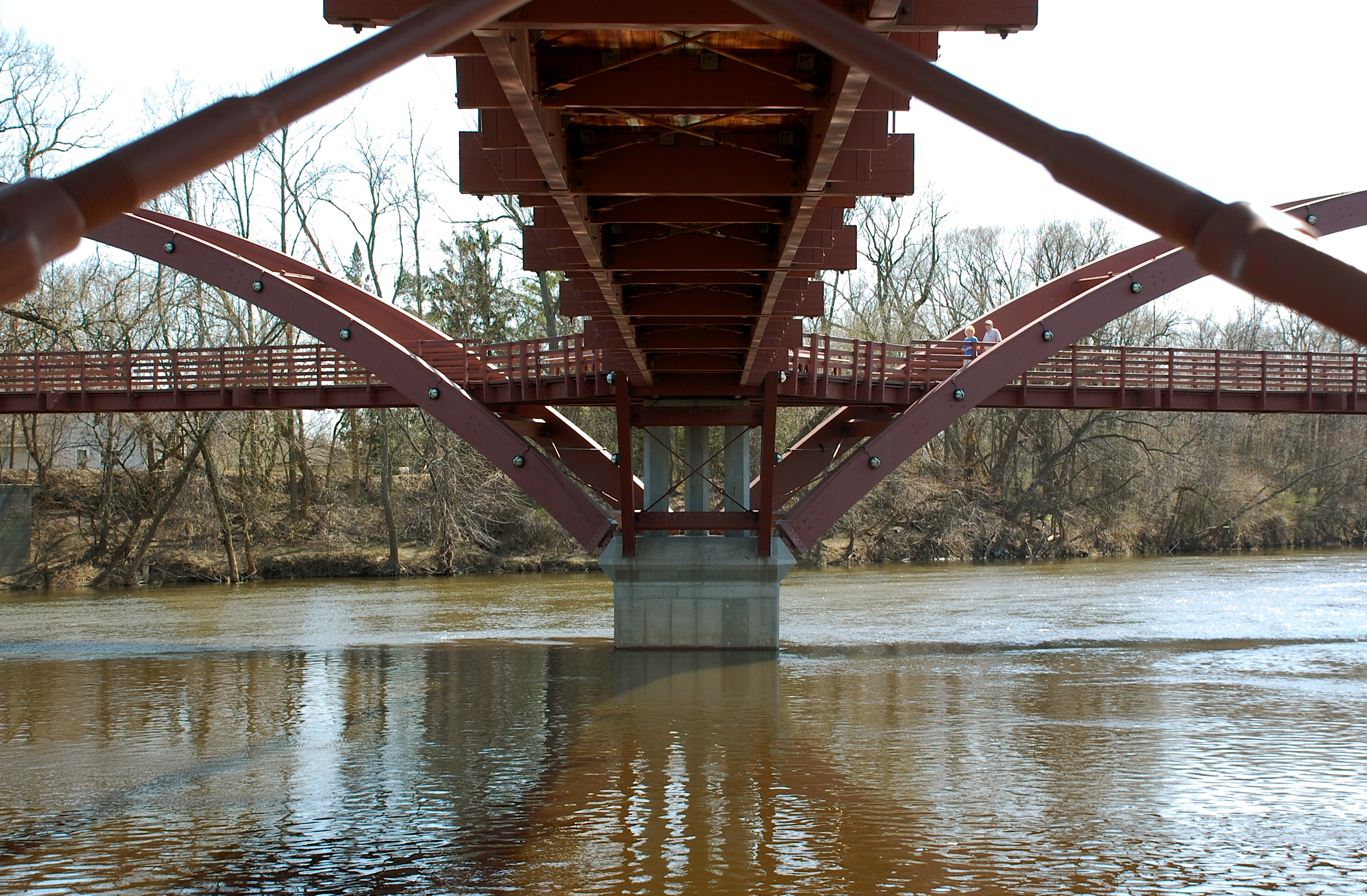
The Tridge is a three-way footbridge at the confluence of the Tittabawassee and Chippewa rivers

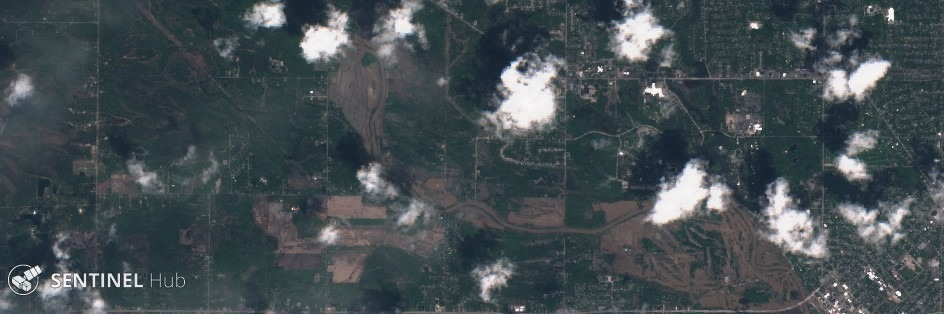
May 2020 floods viewed from space.

== See also ==
- The Tridge
