= Cedar River (Gladwin County, Michigan) =

River in Clare and Gladwin counties, Michigan, United States

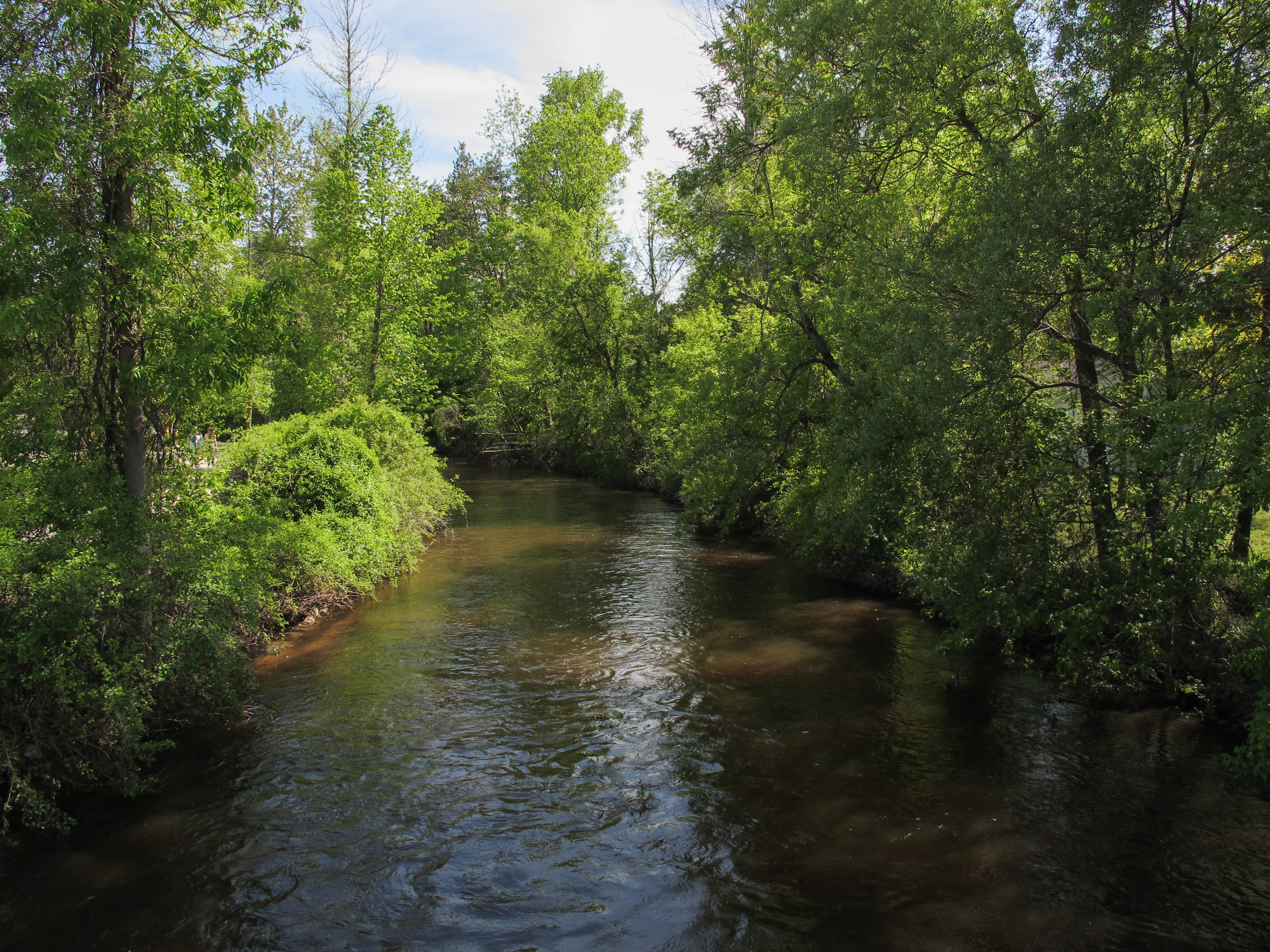
- The Cedar River in Gladwin

- Location within the state of Michigan

Location
- Country: United States
- State: Michigan

Physical characteristics
- Source
  - location: Hamilton Township, Michigan
  - coordinates: 44°02′20″N 84°39′56″W
- Mouth
  - location: Tobacco River
  - coordinates: 44°02′40″N 84°37′54″W
  - elevation: 712 ft (217 m)

Basin features
- River system: Saginaw River

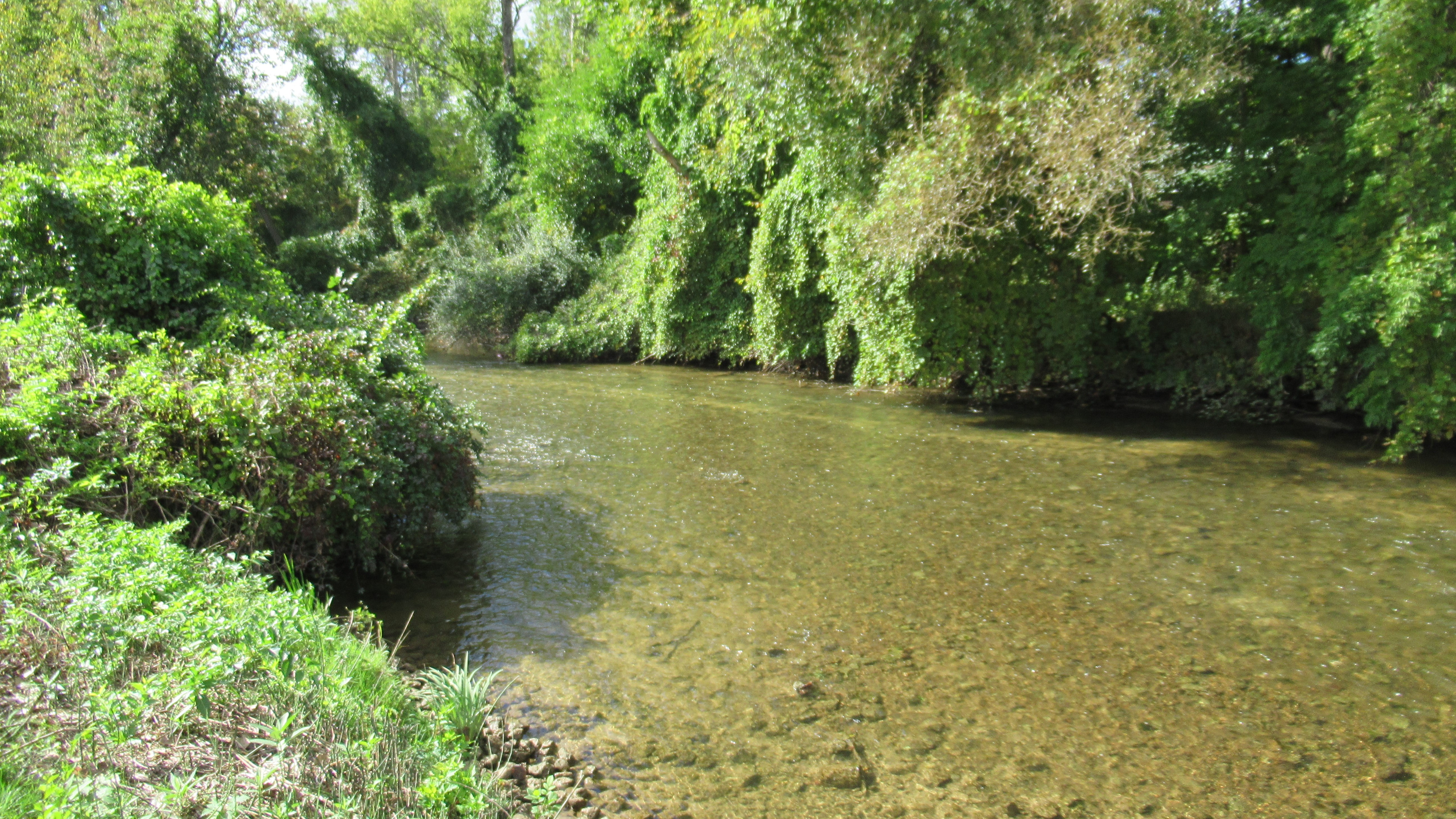
The creek flowing through downtown Gladwin

The Cedar River is a 29.0-mile-long (46.7 km) river in the U.S. state of Michigan, flowing through Clare County and Gladwin County.

The main branch of the river is formed by the confluence of Cranberry Creek and the West Branch Cedar River at 44°02′20″N 84°39′56″W in Hamilton Township, Clare County. It flows into the Tobacco River at 43°53′17″N 84°29′14″W in Beaverton.

The North Branch Cedar River rises at 44°08′54″N 84°30′58″W in northwest Gladwin County in Sherman Township east of Meredith near the border with Roscommon County, and joins the main branch at 44°01′38″N 84°34′35″W a few miles northwest of Wiggins Lake.

The Middle Branch Cedar River rises at 44°06′47″N 84°37′23″W in northeast Clare County in Franklin Township just west of Meredith. It flows mostly south and joins with the West Branch at 44°02′40″N 84°37′54″W in Hamilton Township, near the Gladwin County border.

The West Branch Cedar River rises at 44°06′49″N 84°39′08″W in Franklin Township, a few miles southwest of Meredith. Another tributary, Cranberry Creek rises in Arnold and Cranberry lakes a few miles northeast of Harrison.

The Little Cedar River is not a tributary of the Cedar River, but flows into the Tobacco River approximately 5 miles (8 km) downstream from Beaverton.

== Tributaries and features ==
From the mouth:

- (left) Doone Creek
- (left) Farm Drain
- (right) Canham Drain
- (left) Lucas Drain
- (left) Swan Lake (also known as Slaughterhouse Lake)
- City of Gladwin
- Bendle Drain
- Silver Creek
- Chappel Dam
- Wiggins Lake (also known as Chappel Pond)
  - (left) Howland Creek
    - Howland Lake
  - (left) Frost Lake
- (left) Smith Creek
- (right) Lake Contos
  - (left) Puro Lake
  - Mud Lake
    - Pratt Lake
- (right) North Branch Cedar River
  - (left) Peach Lake
  - (left) McGilvery Lake
  - (left) Schoolhouse Lake
  - (right) Greasy Jim Lake
  - (left) Blue Lake
    - Island Lake
  - (left) Streaked Lake
    - Trout Lake (Gladwin County)
      - House Lake
      - Hoister Lake (also known as Holster Lake)
- (right) Middle Branch Cedar River
  - (right) Lindy Lake
  - (left) Lake Little George
  - Trout Lake (Clare County)
- (left) Decker Lake
- (right) West Branch Cedar River
  - (left) Popple Creek
- (left) Cranberry Creek
    - Cranberry Lake
    - Arnold Lake

== Drainage basin ==
The Cedar River drains portions of the following:

- Clare County
  - Arthur Township
  - Franklin Township
  - Frost Township
  - Hamilton Township
  - Hayes Township
- Gladwin County, Michigan
  - City of Beaverton
  - Beaverton Township
  - Buckeye Township
  - City of Gladwin
  - Gladwin Township
  - Grout Township
  - Sage Township
  - Sherman Township
  - Tobacco Township
