= Beaver, Michigan =

Beaver may refer to the following places in the U.S. state of Michigan:

- Beaver, Bay County, Michigan
- Beaver, Delta County, Michigan
- Beaver Island, Michigan
- Beaver Township, Bay County, Michigan
- Beaver Township, Newaygo County, Michigan

== See also ==
- Beaverton, Michigan, city in Gladwin County
- Beaverton Township, Michigan in Gladwin County
- Beaver Creek Township, Michigan in Crawford County
- Beaver Island (Lake Michigan)
