= Second mile =

Second mile may refer to:

- 2nd Mile, an American Christian rock and worship band from Gladwin, Michigan
- The Second Mile, a former nonprofit organization founded in 1977 by Jerry Sandusky
