= Franklin Township, Clare County, Michigan =

Franklin Township, Michigan
- Civil township
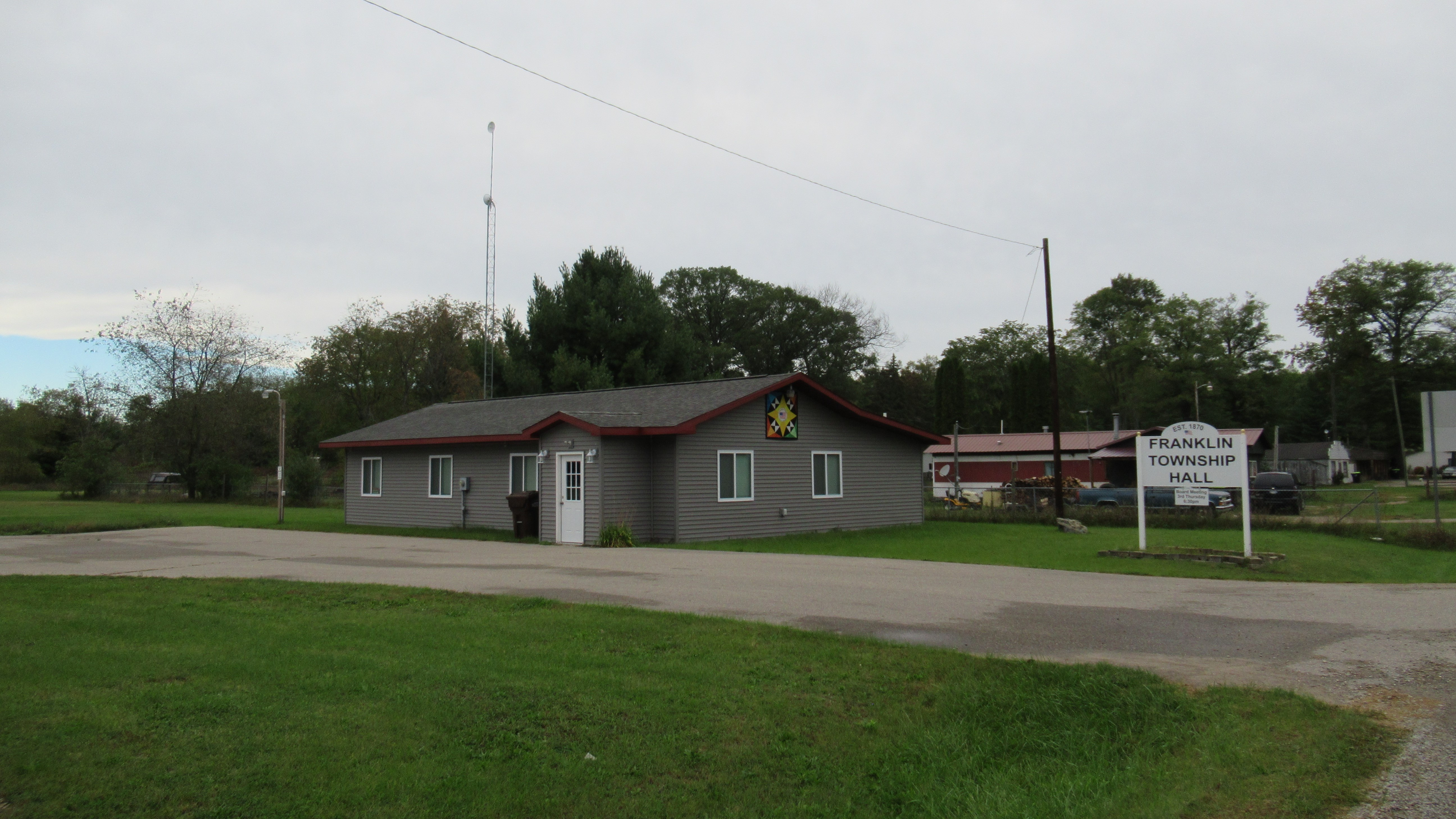
- Franklin Township Hall in Meredith

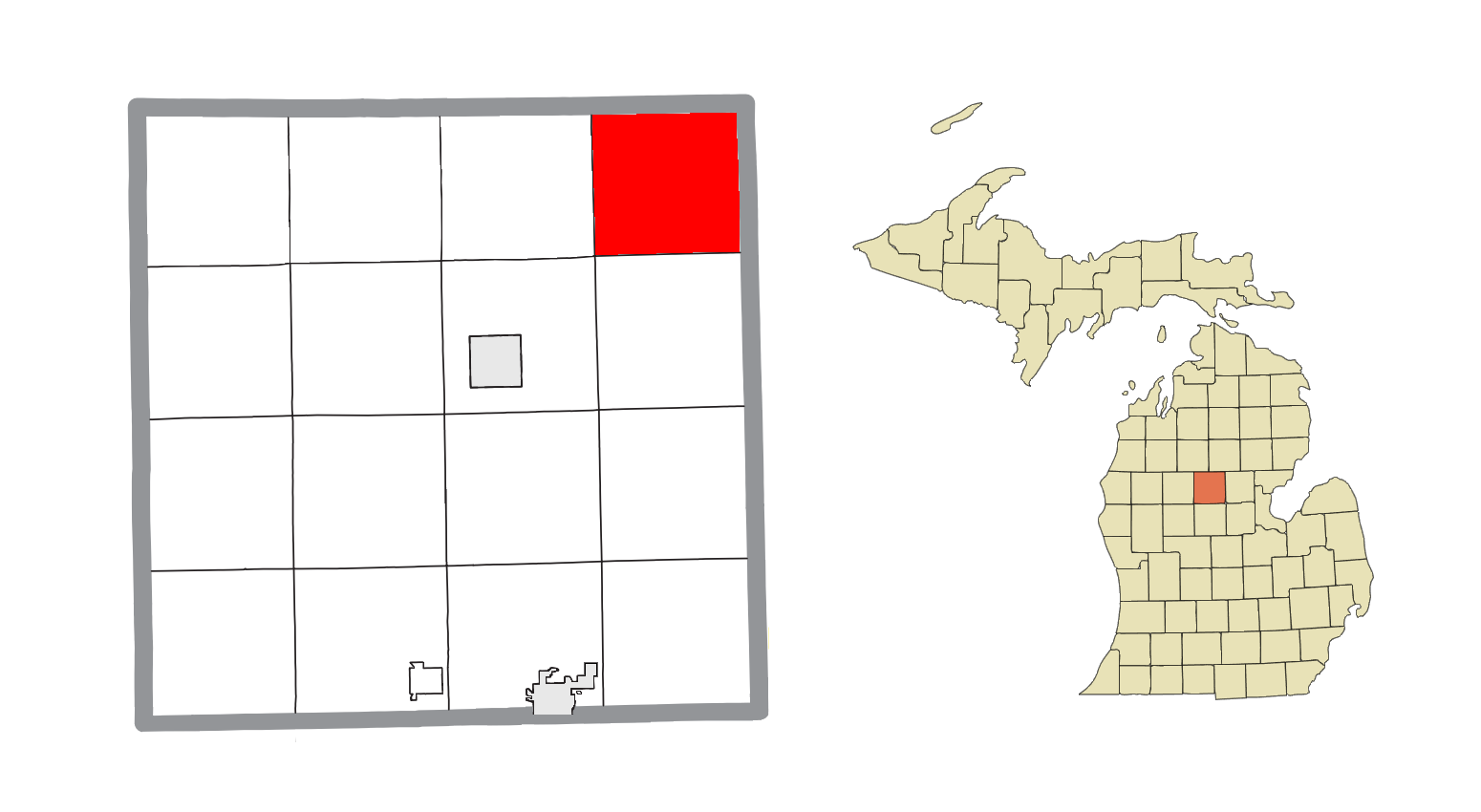
- Location within Clare County

- Location within the state of Michigan Location within the United States
- Coordinates: 44°06′50″N 84°40′12″W
- Country: United States
- State: Michigan
- County: Clare
- Established: 1870

Government
  - Supervisor: Ed Erskine
  - Clerk: Alexa Cooper

Area
  - Total: 35.47 sq mi (91.87 km^{2})
  - Land: 35.33 sq mi (91.50 km^{2})
  - Water: 0.14 sq mi (0.36 km^{2})
- Elevation: 1,138 ft (347 m)

Population (2020)
  - Total: 730
  - Density: 20.7/sq mi (8.0/km^{2})
- Time zone: UTC-5 (Eastern (EST))
  - Summer (DST): UTC-4 (EDT)
- ZIP code(s): 48624 (Gladwin); 48625 (Harrison)
- Area code: 989
- FIPS code: 26-30280
- GNIS feature ID: 1626306
- Website: Official website

Franklin Township is a civil township of Clare County in the U.S. state of Michigan. The population was 730 at the 2020 census.

== Communities ==
- Meredith is an unincorporated community along the eastern boundary of the township with Sherman Township in Gladwin County at 44°07′50″N 84°36′26″W. During the lumber boom of the late 1800s, the settlement had a population of as many as 1,800 people. A post office operated from January 14, 1884, until October 14, 1895.

== Geography ==
According to the U.S. Census Bureau, the township has a total area of 35.47 square miles (91.87 km^{2}), of which 35.33 square miles (91.50 km^{2}) is land and 0.14 square miles (0.36 km^{2}) (0.39%) is water.

=== Major highways ===
- M-18 (N. Clarwin Road) forms most of the eastern boundary of the township with Gladwin County.

== Demographics ==
As of the census of 2000, there were 809 people, 343 households, and 239 families residing in the township. The population density was 22.9 inhabitants per square mile (8.8/km^{2}). There were 915 housing units at an average density of 25.8 per square mile (10.0/km^{2}). The racial makeup of the township was 99.13% White, and 0.87% from two or more races. Hispanic or Latino of any race were 0.74% of the population.

There were 343 households, out of which 25.9% had children under the age of 18 living with them, 55.4% were married couples living together, 7.9% had a female householder with no husband present, and 30.3% were non-families. 25.9% of all households were made up of individuals, and 9.6% had someone living alone who was 65 years of age or older. The average household size was 2.36 and the average family size was 2.74.

In the township the population was spread out, with 22.7% under the age of 18, 6.6% from 18 to 24, 24.0% from 25 to 44, 32.0% from 45 to 64, and 14.7% who were 65 years of age or older. The median age was 43 years. For every 100 females, there were 121.6 males. For every 100 females age 18 and over, there were 123.2 males.

The median income for a household in the township was $25,598, and the median income for a family was $26,932. Males had a median income of $29,583 versus $15,795 for females. The per capita income for the township was $12,353. About 13.4% of families and 19.6% of the population were below the poverty line, including 18.3% of those under age 18 and 32.4% of those age 65 or over.

== Education ==
Franklin Township is served entirely by Harrison Community Schools to the southwest in the city of Harrison.
