= Gladwin Zettel Memorial Airport =

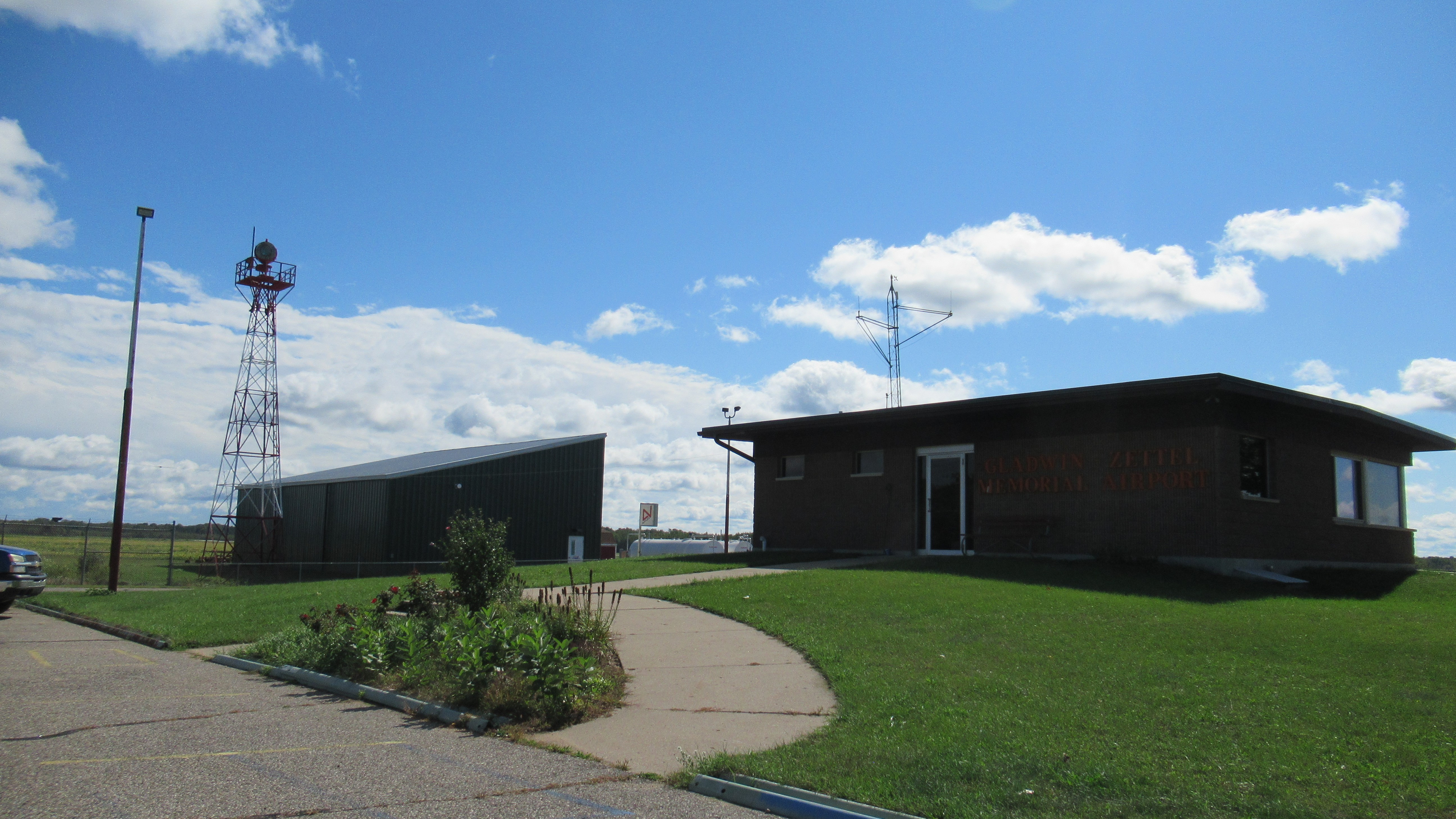
- IATA: GDW; ICAO: KGDW; FAA LID: GDW

Summary
- Airport type: Public
- Owner: City/County of Gladwin
- Serves: Gladwin, Michigan
- Elevation AMSL: 774 ft (236 m)
- Coordinates: 43°58′14″N 084°28′30″W

Map
- Location of airport in Michigan GDW (the United States)

Runways
Direction	Length		Surface
Direction	ft	m	Surface
9/27	4,699	1,432	Asphalt
15/33	2,580	786	Turf

Statistics (2019)
- Aircraft operations: 4,420
- Based aircraft: 15
- Source: Federal Aviation Administration

Gladwin Zettel Memorial Airport (IATA: GDW, ICAO: KGDW, FAA LID: GDW) is a public use airport located one nautical mile (2 km) southeast of the central business district of Gladwin, a city in Gladwin County, Michigan, United States. The airport is owned by the city and county. It is included in the Federal Aviation Administration (FAA) National Plan of Integrated Airport Systems for 2017–2021, in which it is categorized as a local general aviation facility.

The Class E Airspace around the airport was modified in 2016.

== Events ==
The airport has been host to formation flying clinics to help pilots prepare for the Mass Arrival Saturday at EAA Airventure in Oshkosh, Wisconsin. It also holds a number of aviation education events and air tours, attracting pilots from Michigan and Canada. These events are part of efforts by airport management to prove the economic necessity of the airport to the community.

The airport is host to a number of non-aviation events such as pancake breakfasts, open houses, car shows, and drag racing.

== Facilities and aircraft ==
Gladwin Zettel Memorial Airport covers an area of 304 acres (121 ha) at an elevation of 773 feet (236 m) above mean sea level. It has two runways: 9/27 is 4,699 by 75 feet (1,432 x 23 m) with an asphalt surface; 15/33 is 2,580 by 150 feet (786 x 46 m) with a turf surface.

The airport has a fixed-base operator that sells fuel and other amenities such as courtesy cars and a crew lounge.

For the 12-month period ending December 31, 2016, the airport had 4,420 general aviation aircraft operations, an average of 12 per day. At that time there were 15 aircraft based at this airport: 12 single-engine and 2 multi-engine airplanes as well as 1 jet.

The airport is staffed from 9AM until 5:05PM. It is accessible by road from State St, and is close to M-18 and M-61.

== Accidents and incidents ==
- On July 14, 2001, the propeller of a Piper PA-28 Cherokee contacted the pilot at the airport. The aircraft was directed to a parking spot after landing, and it came to a complete stop. At that point, the pilot exited the aircraft, with another pilot at the controls, to look for a fuel truck. The pilot slipped forward and threw his arms up, impacting the propeller. The probable cause was found to be the pilot's poor decision to exit the airplane onto the wing while the propeller was running.
- On July 4, 2005, a Becker RAF 2000 gyrocopter impacted terrain while in the traffic pattern at Gladwin Airport. The pilot's instructor asked whether the plane was out of trim after three takeoffs and landings, and on the next departure, the aircraft lost control while turning from the crosswind leg to the downwind leg of the traffic pattern. The aircraft entered a sudden descent, during which the main rotor blades folded up and over the gyrocopter, possibly striking the propeller blades. The aircraft then rose, flipped over, and spun backwards and sideways until it impacted the ground. The probable cause was found to be the pilot's failure to maintain control of the gyrocopter while in the traffic pattern.
- On September 30, 2021, an ultralight aircraft departing from Gladwin crashed after takeoff. Witnesses reported the aircraft climbed quickly before suddenly crashing.

== See also ==
- List of airports in Michigan
