= God of This City =

God of This City may refer to:

- God of This City (Passion album), 2008
- God of This City (Bluetree album), 2009
