= Skeels =

Skeels is a surname, and may refer to:

- Dave Skeels (1891–1926), an American baseball player
- Eric Skeels (born 1939), an English former football player
- Homer Collar Skeels (1873–1934), an American agriculturist and botanist
- Talan Skeels-Piggins (born 1970), a British alpine skier

== See also ==
- Skeel
- Skeels, Michigan, a community in the United States
