= Skeels, Michigan =

- Unincorporated community
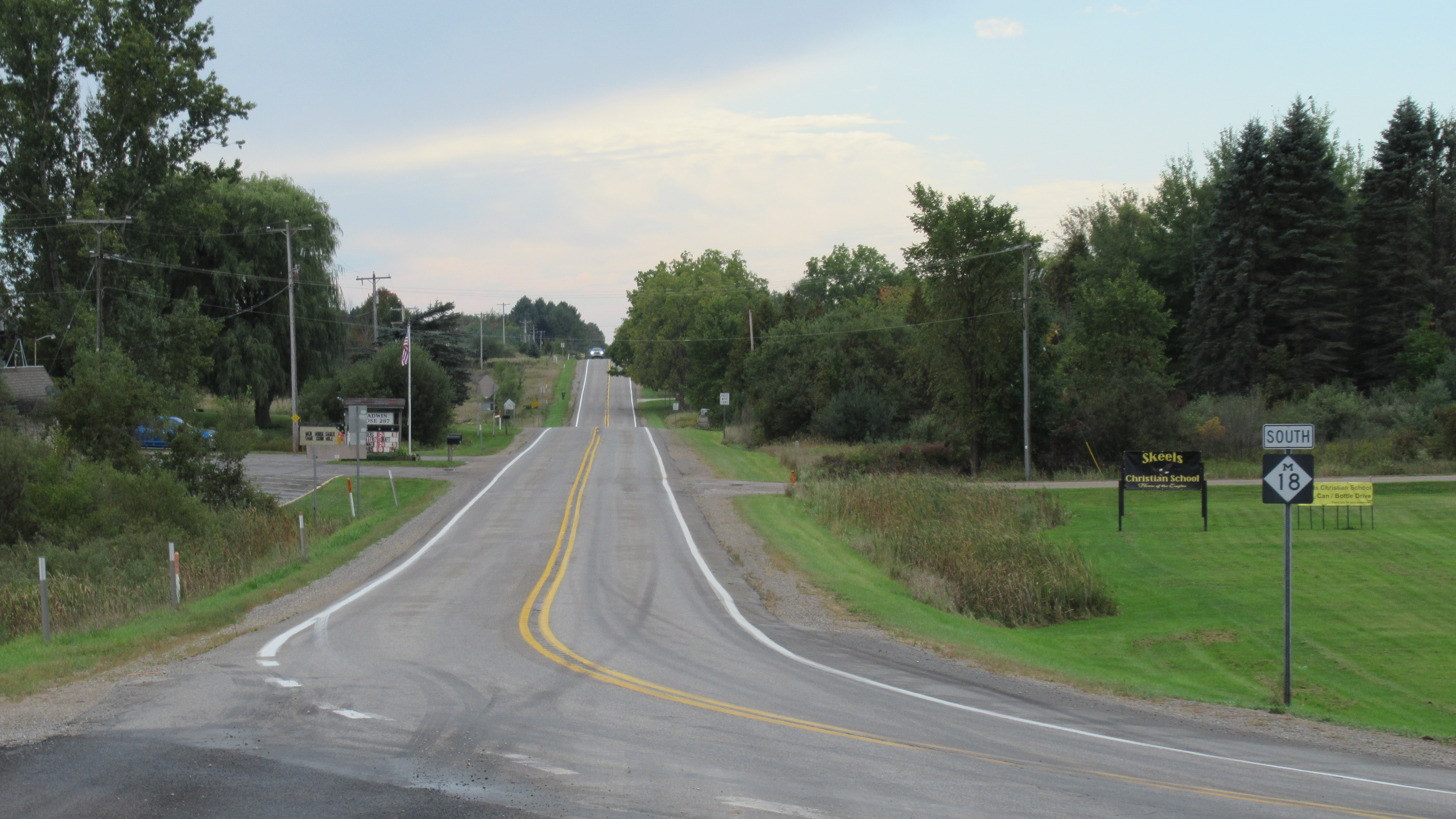
- Looking south along M-18

- Location within the state of Michigan Location within the United States
- Coordinates: 44°05′24″N 84°35′12″W
- Country: United States
- State: Michigan
- County: Gladwin
- Elevation: 1,001 ft (305 m)
- Time zone: UTC-5 (Eastern (EST))
  - Summer (DST): UTC-4 (EDT)
- ZIP code(s): 48624 (Gladwin)
- Area code: 989
- GNIS feature ID: 638050

Skeels is an unincorporated community in Gladwin County in the U.S. state of Michigan. The community is located within Sherman Township along a curve in M-18. As an unincorporated community, Skeels has no legally defined boundaries or population statistics of its own.

== History ==
A post office called Skeels was established in 1898, and remained in operation until 1920. Simeon Skeels, an early postmaster and local merchant, gave the community his last name.
