= Sage Township, Michigan =

- Civil township
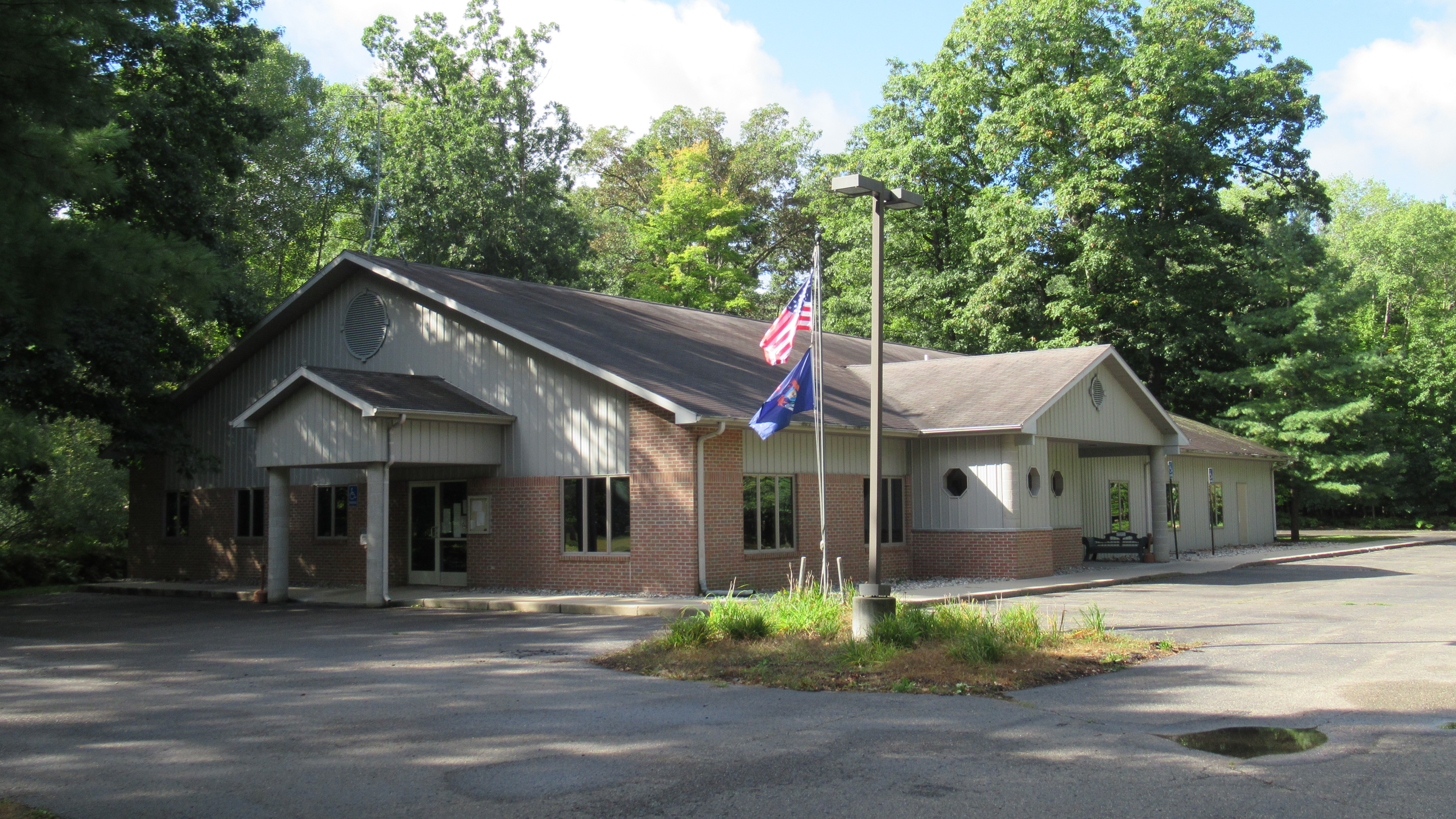
- Sage Township Hall

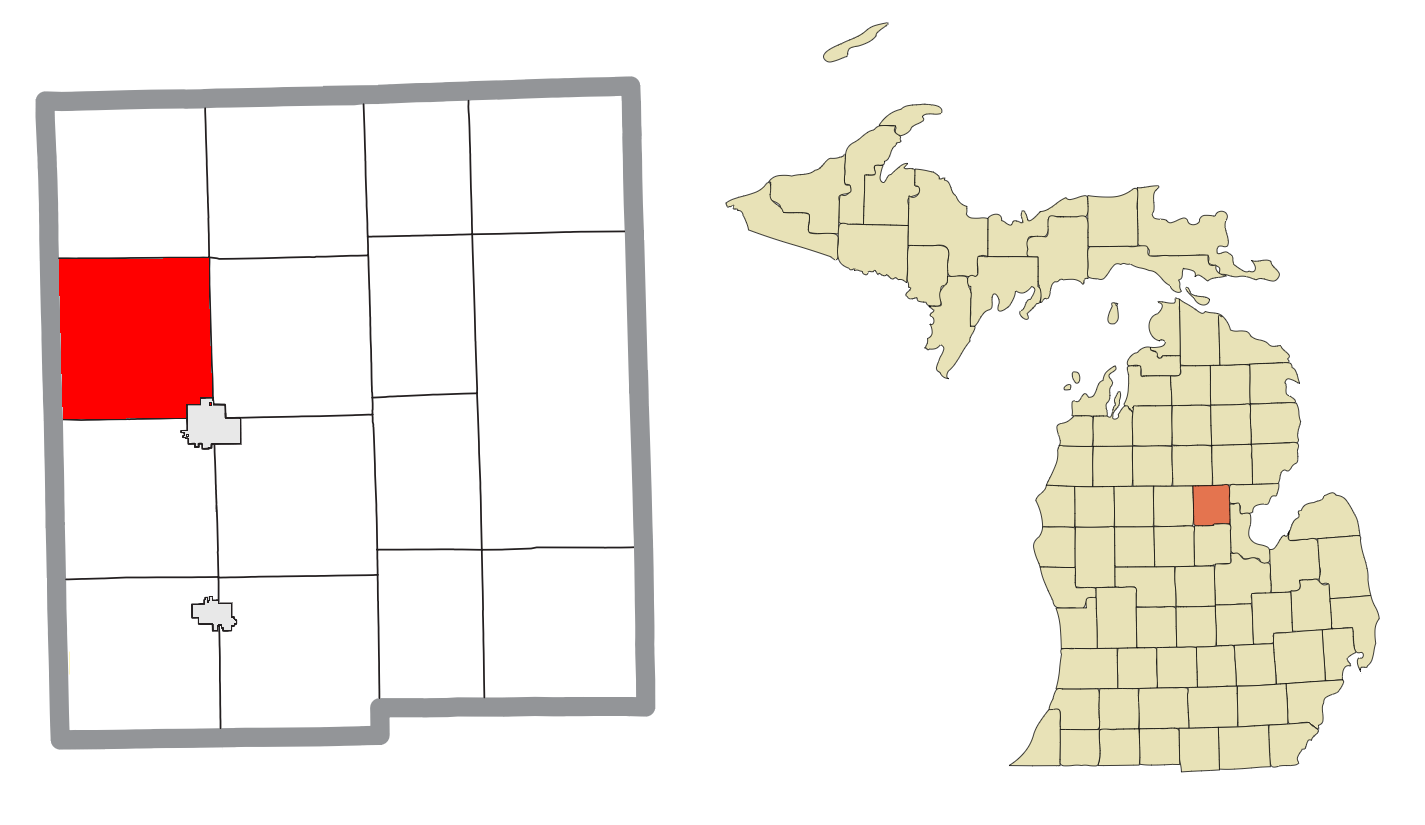
- Location within Gladwin County

- Location within the state of Michigan Location within the United States
- Coordinates: 44°01′19″N 84°32′54″W
- Country: United States
- State: Michigan
- County: Gladwin

Government
  - Supervisor: Renee Zelt
  - Clerk: Laura Flach

Area
  - Total: 35.43 sq mi (91.76 km^{2})
  - Land: 34.23 sq mi (88.66 km^{2})
  - Water: 1.20 sq mi (3.11 km^{2})
- Elevation: 869 ft (265 m)

Population (2020)
  - Total: 2,431
  - Density: 71.02/sq mi (27.42/km^{2})
- Time zone: UTC-5 (Eastern (EST))
  - Summer (DST): UTC-4 (EDT)
- ZIP code(s): 48624 (Gladwin)
- Area code: 989
- FIPS code: 26-70500
- GNIS feature ID: 1627019
- Website: https://www.sagetownship.org/

Sage Township is a civil township of Gladwin County in the U.S. state of Michigan. The population was 2,431 at the 2020 census.

== Geography ==
According to the U.S. Census Bureau, the township has a total area of 35.43 square miles (91.76 km^{2}), of which 34.23 square miles (88.66 km^{2}) is land and 1.20 square miles (3.11 km^{2}) (3.39%) is water.

Pratt Lake is located in the center of the township.

=== Major highways ===
- M-18 runs west–east and forms most of the northern boundary of the township. At the northeast corner of the township, M-18 turns south and forms the entire eastern boundary of the township.
- M-61 runs west–east for a brief length at the southwest corner of the township.

== Demographics ==
As of the census of 2000, there were 2,617 people, 986 households, and 775 families residing in the township. The population density was 75.8 inhabitants per square mile (29.3/km^{2}). There were 1,526 housing units at an average density of 44.2 per square mile (17.1/km^{2}). The racial makeup of the township was 97.02% White, 0.04% African American, 0.76% Native American, 0.38% Asian, 0.27% from other races, and 1.53% from two or more races. Hispanic or Latino of any race were 0.38% of the population.

There were 986 households, out of which 31.2% had children under the age of 18 living with them, 67.8% were married couples living together, 7.9% had a female householder with no husband present, and 21.3% were non-families. 18.5% of all households were made up of individuals, and 8.5% had someone living alone who was 65 years of age or older. The average household size was 2.60 and the average family size was 2.93.

In the township the population was spread out, with 24.7% under the age of 18, 6.2% from 18 to 24, 24.1% from 25 to 44, 26.6% from 45 to 64, and 18.4% who were 65 years of age or older. The median age was 42 years. For every 100 females, there were 98.1 males. For every 100 females age 18 and over, there were 95.0 males.

The median income for a household in the township was $33,173, and the median income for a family was $37,143. Males had a median income of $31,078 versus $22,339 for females. The per capita income for the township was $15,470. About 9.3% of families and 12.2% of the population were below the poverty line, including 17.9% of those under age 18 and 4.8% of those age 65 or over.
