= Skeel =

Skeel is a surname. Notable people with the name include:

- Albret Skeel (1572–1639), State Admiral of Denmark
- Alex Skeel (born 1995), English domestic violence victim
- Berte Skeel (1644–1720), Danish noble, philanthropist and estate owner
- Burt E. Skeel (1894–1924), American pilot
- Caroline Skeel (1872–1951), British historian
- Charlotte Amalie Skeel (1700–1763), Danish noble
- Christian Skeel (born 1956), Danish artist and composer
- David Skeel (born 1961), American law professor
- Ingeborg Skeel (c. 1545–1604), Danish noblewoman and county sheriff
- Jørgen Erik Skeel (1737–1795), Danish prime minister
- Mogens Skeel (1651–1694), Danish playwright
- Richard Skeel, American college administrator and baseball coach
- Vilhelm Mathias Skeel (1746–1817), Danish landowner, county official and military officer

== See also ==
- Skeels (disambiguation)
