= Pratt Lake =

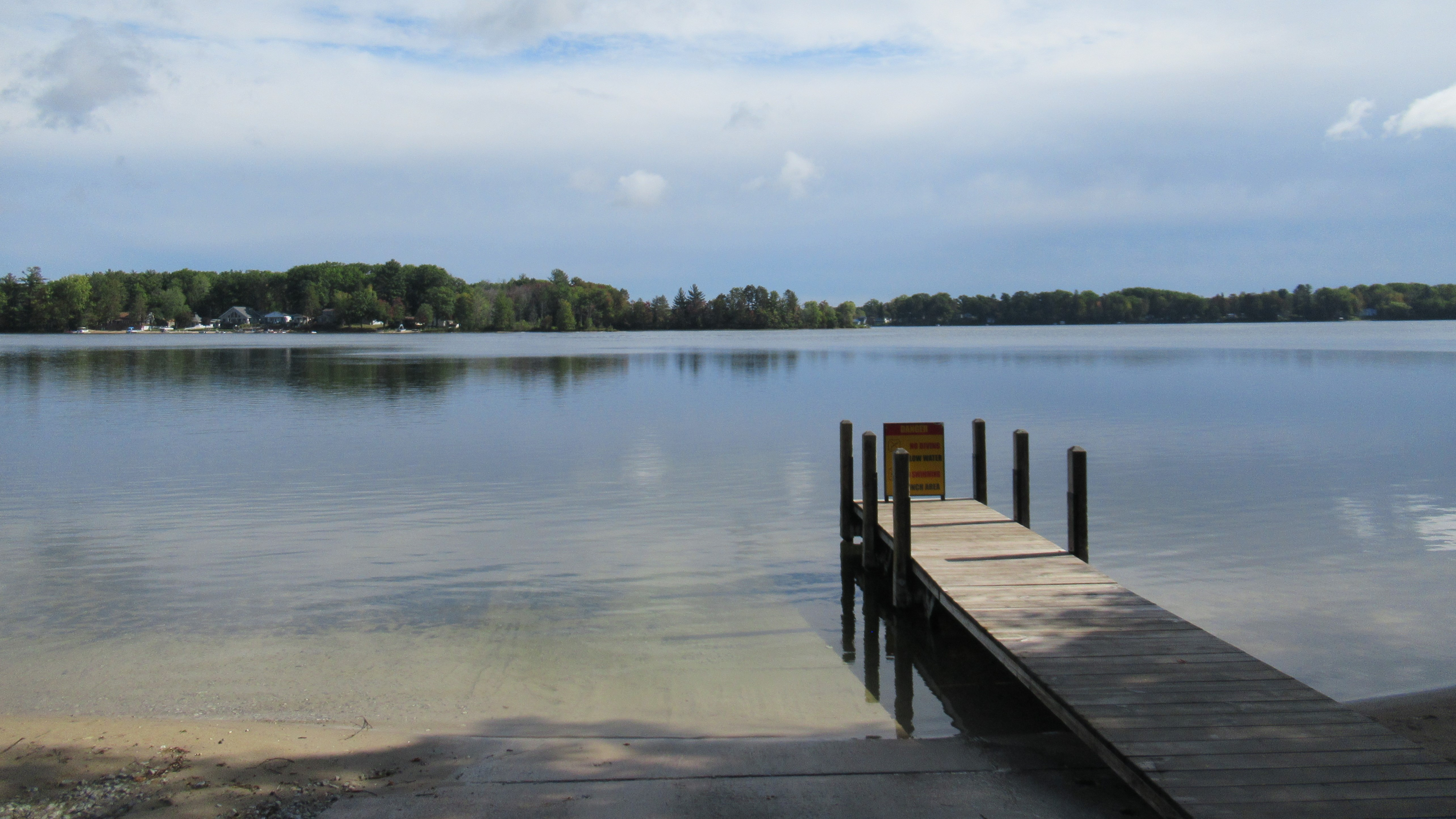
- View from the boating access point

- Location within Michigan
- Location: Gladwin County, Michigan
- Coordinates: 44°01′34″N 84°32′51″W
- Type: lake
- Surface area: 180 acres (73 ha)
- Max. depth: 28 feet (8.5 m)
- Settlements: Sage Township

Pratt Lake is a lake in the U.S. state of Michigan. The surface area of the lake is 180 acres (73 ha). It reaches a depth of 28 feet (8.5 m).

Pratt Lake was named after one Mr. Pratt, a businessperson who rented cabins at the lake to visitors.
