= Bluetree =

Northern Irish Christian band (2004–2017)

- Origin: Belfast, Northern Ireland
- Genres: CCM; worship; rock; electronica
- Years active: 2004–2017
- Labels: Bluetree Worship, Integrity
- Website: bluetreeworship.com

Bluetree were a Northern Irish contemporary Christian band. The band is best known for its song "God of This City", which received international exposure when it was covered by Chris Tomlin on both the Passion: God of This City and Hello Love albums. As an independent band, Bluetree signed distribution agreements with Lucid Entertainment in the US and Kingsway in the UK & Europe for their album, God of this City.

== History ==
Bluetree originated in Christian Fellowship Church in Belfast in 2004. Bluetree originally consisted of five members, with Pete Kernoghan joining later. While the band was travelling on a missions trip to Pattaya southeast of Bangkok, Thailand, they were inspired to write a song, "God of this City". Band members said that the song came from divine inspiration when the band was playing in a bar. The song refers to the impoverished and desperate conditions the band witnessed during their trip.

As an independent band, they recorded their debut album, Greater Things, in Dublin, Ireland at Windmill Lane Studios (U2's preferred studio). The record was initially released in September 2007 but on 24 January 2008, their album was picked up by Fierce! Records for UK Distribution. In May 2009 the band launched a charity "Stand Out International" which indirectly rescues children from the sex industry; they also had their first album, God of This City, released in North America. In 2013, the charity was relaunched in the US with the name Bluetree Worship, a US 501(c)(3) non-profit.

Bluetree was nominated for a Dove Award in 2009 for "God of This City". Their second studio album Kingdom began production in Parr Street Studios which is in Liverpool, England in April 2011, and was digitally released on 8 May 2012 with a small-scale US CD release in June. In 2013, two live projects were released. The first was recorded in 2010 in between their first two studio albums; all funds raised went to missions and a trip to Cambodia with Ratanak International in November 2013. The second was recorded at the Super Summer camp in June 2013 and features guest and fellow Nathan Jess, who is also from Northern Ireland. In 2014, Bluetree's music with Integrity Media was released; they had publishing and recording contracts with Integrity at the time. The first album of the deal was recorded in May 2014 with production by Michael Rossback. Bluetree's lead singer and founder, Aaron Boyd, regularly leads worship at his home church, Christian Fellowship Church in Belfast. Bluetree toured with American Christian rock band 2nd Mile.

In September 2017, Aaron Boyd discontinued the Bluetree moniker and he still tours as a solo artist.

== Members ==
- Aaron Boyd – lead vocals, acoustic guitar, songwriter
- Peter Nickell – bass, keys & tracks
- Peter Burton – electric guitar
- Matt Weir – drums
- Pete Morrison - electric guitar
- Jonny Hobson — drums
- Pete Kernoghan – DJ, loops
- Peter Comfort – drums
- Connor McCrory – electric guitar
- Stephen Greer – electric guitar
- Richard Blakely – electric guitar
- Ian Jordan – keys
- Andy McCann – bass

== Discography ==
Year	Album details	Peak positions			
Year	Album details	US 200	US Christ	US Indie	US Heat
2007	Greater Things: Released: 2007; Label: Independent	—	—	—	—
2009	God of This City: Released: 3 March 2009; Label: Lucid	103	1	8	7
2012	Kingdom: Release: 8 May 2012; Label: Bluetree Worship	—	—	—	—
2013	Live: Mission Edition: Released: 1 Jan 2013; Label: Bluetree Worship	—	—	—	—
2013	Live in Oklahoma: Released: 28 October 2013; Label: Bluetree Worship	—	—	—	—
2014	Worship & Justice: Release due: 26 August 2014; Label: Integrity	—	—	—	—
"—" denotes releases that did not chart

== Awards and accolades ==
- "Break out Artist of the Year" 2009 Worship Leader Magazine Readers Choice Awards USA
- "Song of the Year" 2009 Worship Leader Magazine Readers Choice awards USA
- Nominated as Best New Artist - GMA Dove Awards 2010
- Greater Things - Cross Rhythms' 20 Best Albums of 2007
- "God of this City" - Cross Rhythms' 20 Best Songs of 2007
- A musical named after their hit song 'God Of This City' won a Dove Award for Youth/Children's Musical of the year at the 43rd annual GMA Dove Awards.
