= 2nd Mile =

American Christian rock band

- Origin: Gladwin, Michigan
- Genres: Christian rock, contemporary worship music
- Years active: 2009–2017
- Members: Dave Mead; Audrey Mead; Loren McLaughlin; Tenley McLaughlin; Brian Siler; Andrew Good
- Website: 2ndmileband.com

2nd Mile was an American Christian rock and worship band from Gladwin, Michigan. It was founded in 2009 to provide worship music for local communities, but after several years of performances, the group now performs in venues, concerts and churches across the Lower Peninsula of Michigan. It features Dave Mead on lead vocals and rhythm guitar, Audrey Mead on keyboard, Loren McLaughlin on bass guitar, Tenley McLaughlin on lead guitar and vocals, Brian Siler on drums and percussion, and Andrew Good as sound technician.

2nd Mile performed at the Big Ticket Festival of Gaylord, Michigan in 2013–2015 with Jeremy Camp, Newsboys, Chris Tomlin, and rapper Nate Feuerstein, who is also from Gladwin. The band has also toured with Irish contemporary Christian band Bluetree. After several years of production, the band released its first album, Where I Am, in 2015. The band’s name, 2nd Mile, was inspired by a passage of the Sermon on the Mount.

== History ==
In 2009, the band 2nd Mile was founded in Gladwin, Michigan to provide worship music for their local community. After several years of performing in local venues, the group now performs in venues, concerts and churches across the Lower Peninsula of Michigan. 2nd Mile performed at the 10th Annual Big Ticket Festival in Gaylord, Michigan, along with Jeremy Camp, Newsboys, Chris Tomlin, and rapper Nate Feuerstein, who is also from Gladwin. This was the third time the band had performed at the Big Ticket Festival, along with 2013 and 2014. The band has also toured with Irish contemporary Christian band Bluetree.

2nd Mile performances include covers of popular Christian music, worship music and a number of original songs. After several years of performances and production of original music, the band released its first album, Where I Am, in 2015. The band’s name, 2nd Mile, was inspired by a passage of the Sermon on the Mount. In Matthew 5:41, Jesus said, "And whoever compels you to go one mile, go with him two" (NKJV).

== Members ==
- Dave Mead – lead vocals, rhythm guitar (2009–2017)
- Audrey Mead – keyboard (2015–2017)
- Loren McLaughlin – bass guitar (2009–2017)
- Tenley McLaughlin – lead guitar, vocals (2009–2017)
- Brian Siler – drums, percussion (2015–2017)
- Andrew Good – sound technician (2011–2017)
- Blake Rutledge - Roadie (2016-2017)

=== Others ===
- Aaron Mead – vocals, keyboard (2009-2015)
- Jon Hart – percussion (2009-2010 2013-2015)

== Discography ==
Where I Am

Studio album by 2nd Mile
- Released: 2015 (US)
- Genre: Christian rock
- Length: 39.49

=== 2015: Where I Am ===
No.	Title	Writer(s)	Length
1.	"Let There Be Light"	Dave Mead	3:22
2.	"Where I Am"	Dave Mead	2:57
3.	"Lay It Down"	Dave Mead	5:33
4.	"You Set Me Free"	Dave Mead	4:19
5.	"Celebrate"	Dave Mead	3:55
6.	"You Alone"	Tenley McLaughlin	4:51
7.	"I Am Free"		3:59
8.	"Great I Am"		5:55
9.	"Lift Up His Name"	Aaron Mead	4:10
10.	"I Turn to You"	Aaron Mead	6:10
Total length:			39:49
