= God of This City (Bluetree album) =

Studio album by Bluetree
- Released: March 3, 2009
- Recorded: Windmill Lane Studios
- Genre: CCM, worship, electronic rock
- Length: 70:38
- Label: Lucid Entertainment
- Producer: Paul Mills

Professional ratings
Review scores
Source	Rating
AllMusic	4/5 stars
Soul-Audio	7/10 stars
Jesus Freak Hideout	2/5 stars

God of This City is an album by contemporary Christian band Bluetree. It was released on March 3, 2009 and charted at No. 103 on the Billboard 200. It is essentially a restyled and edited version of the band's debut release Greater Things.

== Track listing ==
1. "Life's Noise" (Aaron Boyd) – 7:30
2. "God's Plan" (Boyd) – 4:35
3. "For You" (Boyd) – 5:06
4. "God of This City" (Bluetree) – 7:09
5. "Your Love" (Boyd) – 6:37
6. "Each Day" (Boyd) – 4:07
7. "When I Survey" (Isaac Watts / Lowell Mason) – 5:02
8. "Oh My God" (Boyd) – 1:03
9. "River" (Boyd) – 7:25
10. "Who Has Held?" (Boyd) – 5:11
11. "Burn Me Up" (Boyd) – 5:40
12. "Standing Out" (Boyd / Richard Bleakley) – 4:56
13. "Your Love (Strings Mix)" (Boyd) – 6:18

== Personnel ==
- Aaron Boyd – lead vocals, guitar
- Peter Kernaghan – DJ loops
- Ian Jordan – piano, synthesizers
- Rick Bleakley – lead guitar, backing vocals
- Andrew McCann – bass guitar
- Peter Comfort – drums
