= Sherman Township, Gladwin County, Michigan =

Sherman Township, Michigan
- Civil township
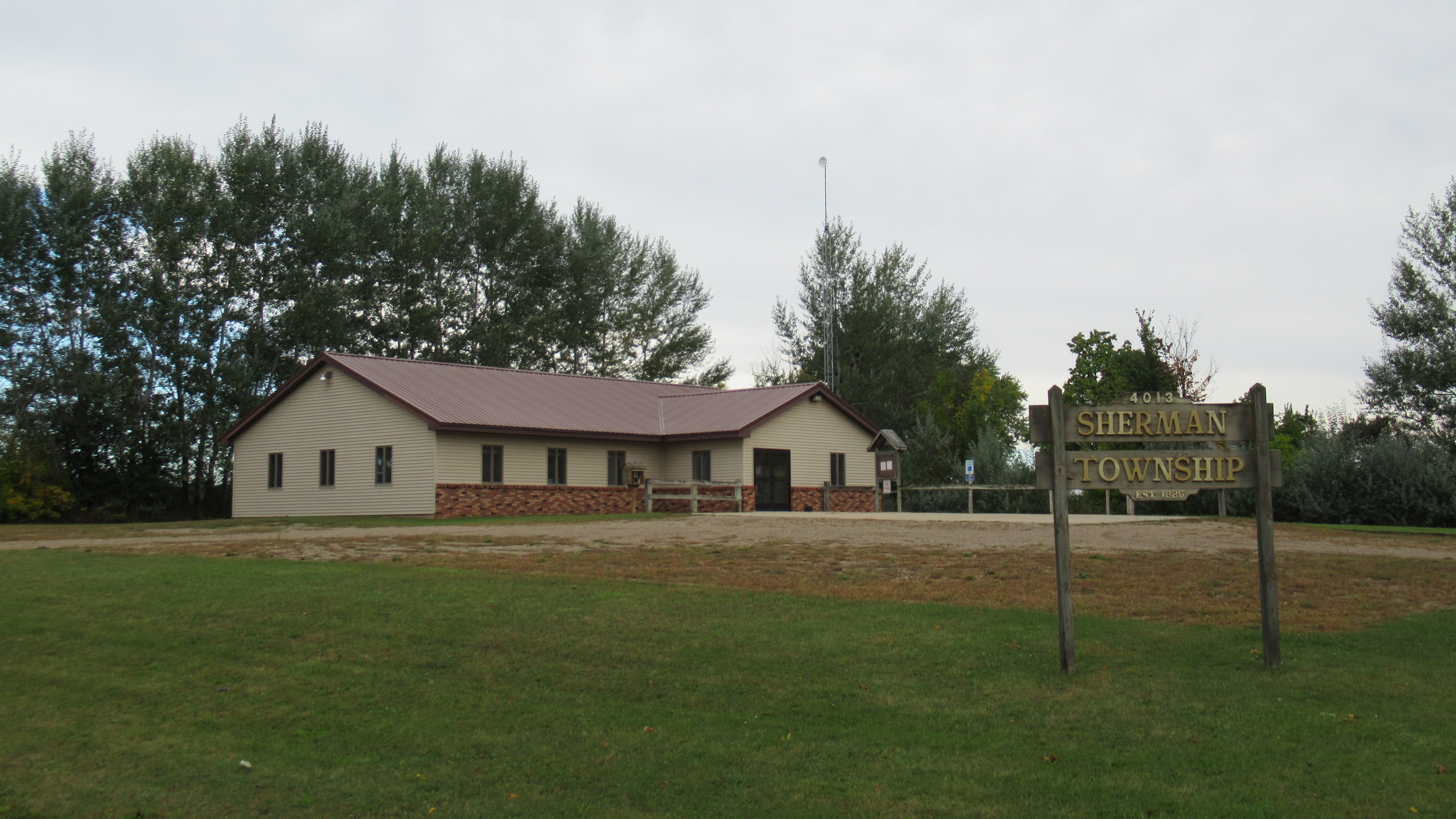
- Sherman Township Hall

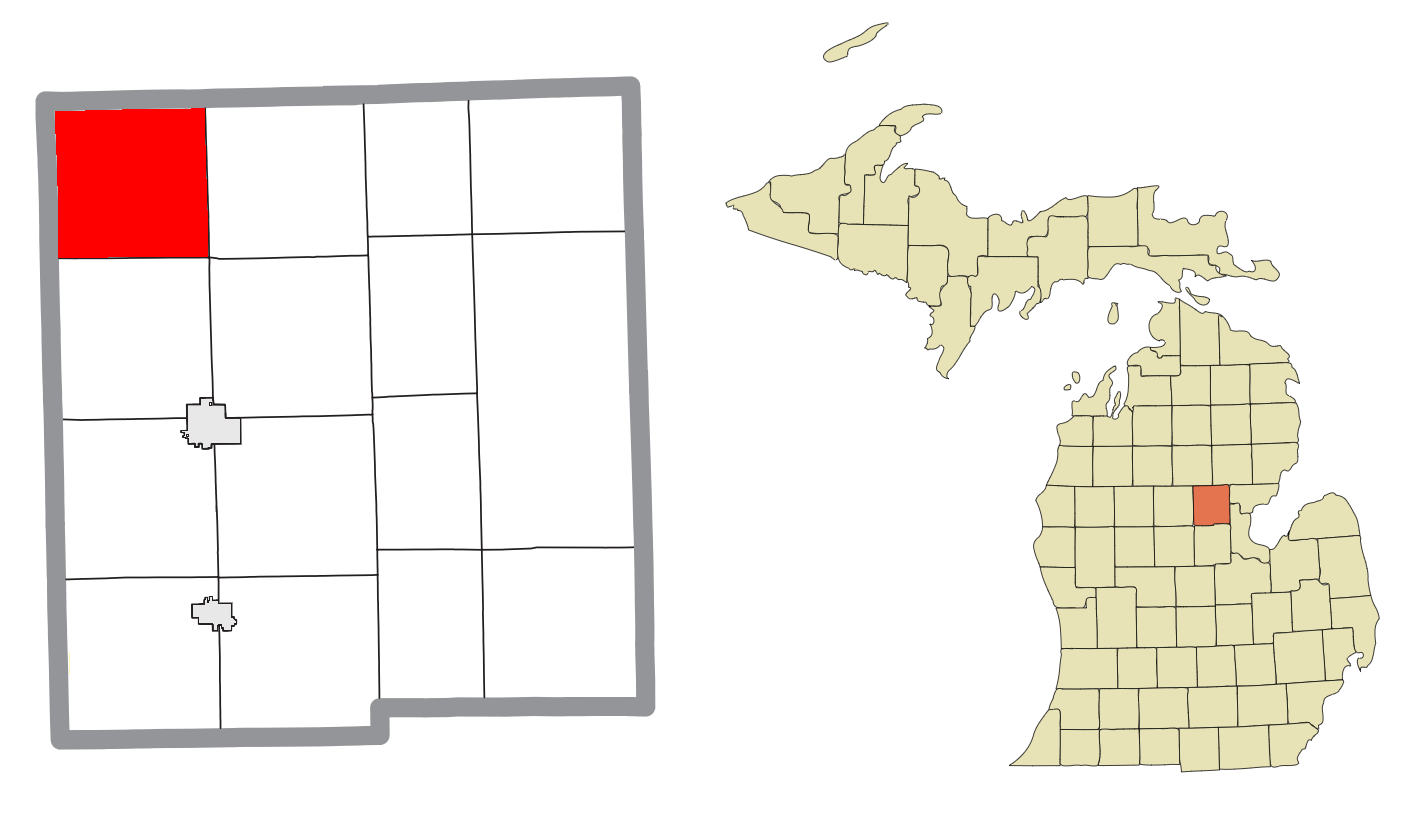
- Location within Gladwin County

- Location within the state of Michigan Location within the United States
- Coordinates: 44°06′51″N 84°33′17″W
- Country: United States
- State: Michigan
- County: Gladwin
- Established: 1889

Government
  - Supervisor: John Jurgensen
  - Clerk: Kay Whalen

Area
  - Total: 35.34 sq mi (91.53 km^{2})
  - Land: 34.87 sq mi (90.31 km^{2})
  - Water: 0.47 sq mi (1.22 km^{2})
- Elevation: 1,004 ft (306 m)

Population (2020)
  - Total: 1,001
  - Density: 28.71/sq mi (11.08/km^{2})
- Time zone: UTC-5 (Eastern (EST))
  - Summer (DST): UTC-4 (EDT)
- ZIP code(s): 48624 (Gladwin)
- Area code: 989
- FIPS code: 26-73140
- GNIS feature ID: 1627070
- Website: Official website

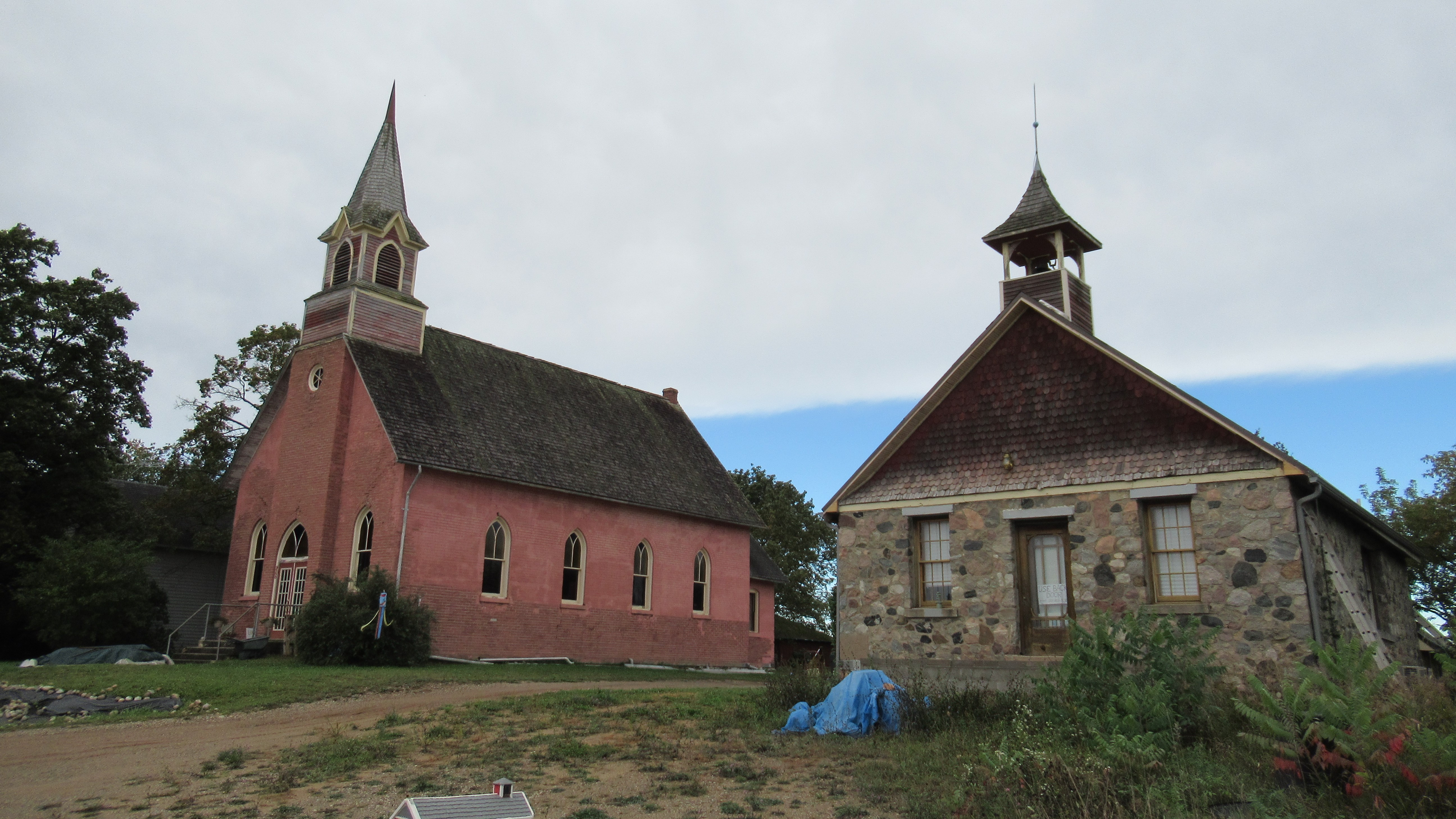
Zion Evangelical Lutheran Church and School, built in 1904

Sherman Township is a civil township of Gladwin County in the U.S. state of Michigan. The population was 1,001 at the 2020 census.

== Communities ==
- Skeels is an unincorporated community in the southwest portion of the township.

== History ==
The township was named after Lowell P. Sherman, an early settler. Sherman Township was established in 1889.

The township contains the county's only designated Michigan State Historic Sites: the Zion Evangelical Lutheran Church and Zion Evangelical Lutheran School on North Oberlin Road, which were both built in 1904.

== Geography ==
According to the U.S. Census Bureau, the township has a total area of 35.34 square miles (91.53 km^{2}), of which 34.87 square miles (90.31 km^{2}) is land and 0.47 square miles (1.22 km^{2}) (1.33%) is water.

=== Major highways ===
- M-18 runs north–south and forms most of the western boundary of the township before turning east and running along the southern boundary of the township.
- F-97, locally named Round Lake Road, runs north–south and forms most of the eastern boundary of the township.

== Demographics ==
As of the census of 2000, there were 1,029 people, 429 households, and 310 families residing in the township. The population density was 29.5 inhabitants per square mile (11.4/km^{2}). There were 950 housing units at an average density of 27.3 per square mile (10.5/km^{2}). The racial makeup of the township was 97.67% White, 0.10% African American, 0.78% Native American, 0.29% Asian, 0.19% Pacific Islander, 0.19% from other races, and 0.78% from two or more races. Hispanic or Latino of any race were 0.49% of the population.

There were 429 households, out of which 23.5% had children under the age of 18 living with them, 62.7% were married couples living together, 7.7% had a female householder with no husband present, and 27.7% were non-families. 22.1% of all households were made up of individuals, and 10.3% had someone living alone who was 65 years of age or older. The average household size was 2.39 and the average family size was 2.72.

In the township the population was spread out, with 21.3% under the age of 18, 4.5% from 18 to 24, 22.4% from 25 to 44, 33.0% from 45 to 64, and 18.8% who were 65 years of age or older. The median age was 46 years. For every 100 females, there were 110.9 males. For every 100 females age 18 and over, there were 101.0 males.

The median income for a household in the township was $30,508, and the median income for a family was $31,607. Males had a median income of $32,250 versus $20,625 for females. The per capita income for the township was $15,386. About 13.4% of families and 14.9% of the population were below the poverty line, including 18.3% of those under age 18 and 1.8% of those age 65 or over.
