= Beaverton, Michigan =

- City
- City of Beaverton
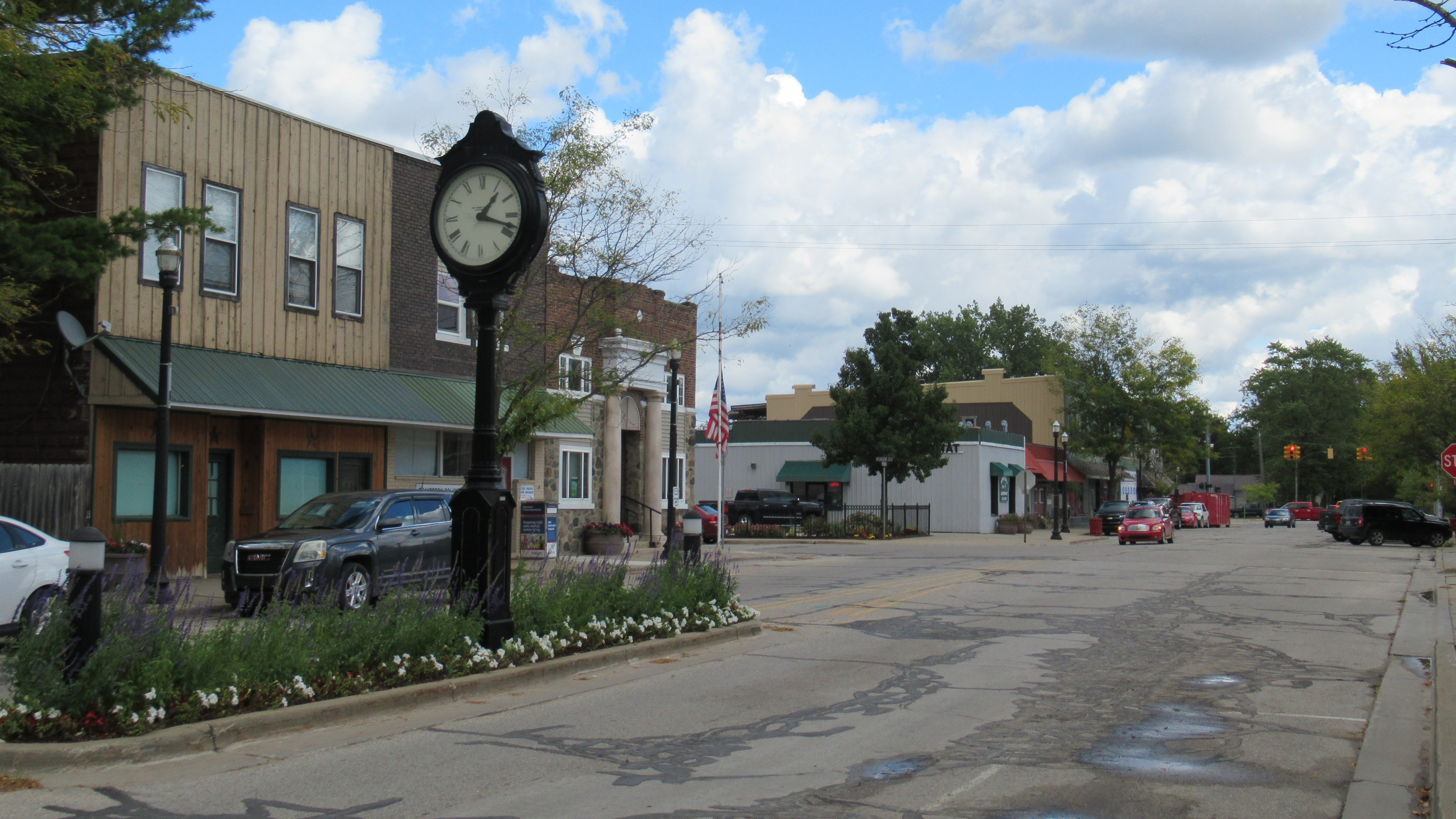
- Looking east along Brown Street toward M-18

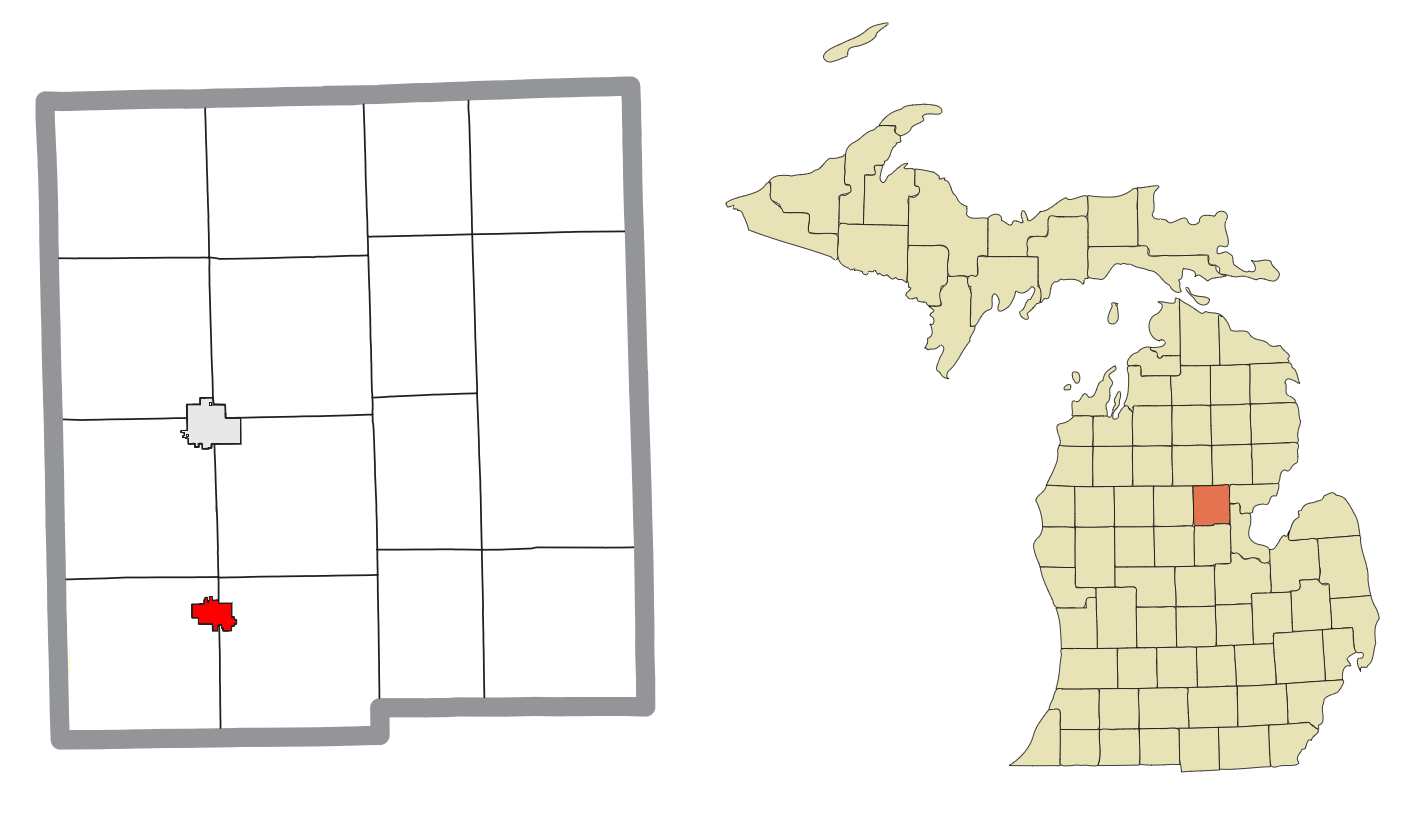
- Location within Gladwin County

- Location within the state of Michigan Location within the United States
- Coordinates: 43°52′56″N 84°29′7″W
- Country: United States
- State: Michigan
- County: Gladwin
- Settled: 1863
- Incorporated: 1901 (village); 1903 (city)

Government
  - Type: Mayor–council
  - Mayor: Ray Nau
  - Manager: Heath Kaplan
  - Clerk: Janelle Keen

Area
  - Total: 1.33 sq mi (3.44 km^{2})
  - Land: 1.05 sq mi (2.72 km^{2})
  - Water: 0.28 sq mi (0.72 km^{2})
- Elevation: 719 ft (219 m)

Population (2020)
  - Total: 1,145
  - Density: 1,090.7/sq mi (421.13/km^{2})
- Time zone: UTC-5 (Eastern (EST))
  - Summer (DST): UTC-4 (EDT)
- ZIP code: 48612
- Area code: 989
- FIPS code: 26-06660
- GNIS feature ID: 0620961
- Website: Official website

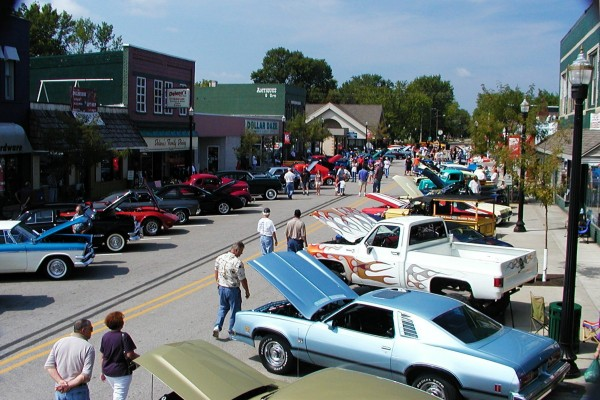
Downtown Beaverton, MI looking west at the south side of Brown Street from M-18.

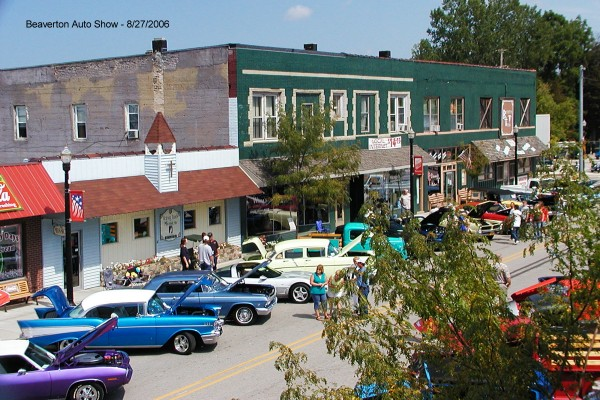
Downtown Beaverton, MI looking east at the north side of Brown Street from Pierson Street.

Beaverton is a city in Gladwin County in the U.S. state of Michigan. The population was 1,145 at the 2020 census. The city is bordered by Beaverton Township on the west, but the two are administered autonomously.

== History ==
Beaverton was first settled by lumbermen circa 1863 and was first known as Grand Forks, after the confluence of the Tobacco and Cedar rivers. It has been continuously settled since 1875. The town was founded in 1890 by the Donald Gunn Ross & Sons lumber company, from Beaverton, Ontario. Donald Ross became the first postmaster on February 17, 1891. Beaverton incorporated as a village on January 9, 1896 and as a city in 1903, with William Ross as the first mayor. Powers gives the first settler's name as Marvil Secord, originally from Brantford, Ontario, and who is also recognized as the first permanent settler in Gladwin County. Beaverton is known as the Plastic Thermoforming capital of the world. It was a station on the Toledo-Ludington line of the Pere Marquette Railroad.

== Geography ==
According to the United States Census Bureau, the city has a total area of 1.33 square miles (3.44 km^{2}), of which 1.04 square miles (2.69 km^{2}) is land and 0.30 square miles (0.78 km^{2}) (22.55%) is water.

=== Major highways ===
- M-18

=== Climate ===
This climatic region is typified by large seasonal temperature differences, with warm to hot (and often humid) summers and cold (sometimes severely cold) winters. According to the Köppen Climate Classification system, Beaverton has a humid continental climate, abbreviated "Dfb" on climate maps.

== Demographics ==
Historical population
Census	Pop.	Note	%±
1910	418		—
1920	549		31.3%
1930	528		−3.8%
1940	641		21.4%
1950	794		23.9%
1960	926		16.6%
1970	954		3.0%
1980	1,025		7.4%
1990	1,150		12.2%
2000	1,106		−3.8%
2010	1,071		−3.2%
2020	1,145		6.9%
U.S. Decennial Census

=== 2010 census ===
As of the census of 2010, there were 1,071 people, 462 households, and 258 families residing in the city. The population density was 1,039.8 inhabitants per square mile (401.5/km^{2}). There were 537 housing units at an average density of 521.4 per square mile (201.3/km^{2}). The racial makeup of the city was 97.7% White, 0.4% African American, 0.7% Native American, and 1.2% from two or more races. Hispanic or Latino of any race were 0.7% of the population.

There were 462 households, of which 28.4% had children under the age of 18 living with them, 34.2% were married couples living together, 16.2% had a female householder with no husband present, 5.4% had a male householder with no wife present, and 44.2% were non-families. 40.5% of all households were made up of individuals, and 18.8% had someone living alone who was 65 years of age or older. The average household size was 2.32 and the average family size was 3.13.

The median age in the city was 36.2 years. 27.1% of residents were under the age of 18; 8.2% were between the ages of 18 and 24; 22.9% were from 25 to 44; 24.5% were from 45 to 64; and 17.5% were 65 years of age or older. The gender makeup of the city was 47.4% male and 52.6% female.

=== 2000 census ===
As of the census of 2000, there were 1,106 people, 496 households, and 291 families residing in the city. The population density was 1,017.6 inhabitants per square mile (392.9/km^{2}). There were 546 housing units at an average density of 502.3 per square mile (193.9/km^{2}). The racial makeup of the city was 97.02% White, 0.99% African American, 0.63% Native American, 0.09% Asian, 0.09% from other races, and 1.18% from two or more races. Hispanic or Latino of any race were 0.54% of the population.

There were 496 households, out of which 29.2% had children under the age of 18 living with them, 41.5% were married couples living together, 13.9% had a female householder with no husband present, and 41.3% were non-families. 39.5% of all households were made up of individuals, and 19.2% had someone living alone who was 65 years of age or older. The average household size was 2.23 and the average family size was 2.96.

In the city, the population was spread out, with 27.1% under the age of 18, 9.0% from 18 to 24, 25.1% from 25 to 44, 20.3% from 45 to 64, and 18.4% who were 65 years of age or older. The median age was 37 years. For every 100 females, there were 87.1 males. For every 100 females age 18 and over, there were 77.5 males.

The median income for a household in the city was $20,625, and the median income for a family was $27,813. Males had a median income of $29,722 versus $18,558 for females. The per capita income for the city was $12,125. About 18.1% of families and 21.9% of the population were below the poverty line, including 26.9% of those under age 18 and 15.2% of those age 65 or over.

== Images ==
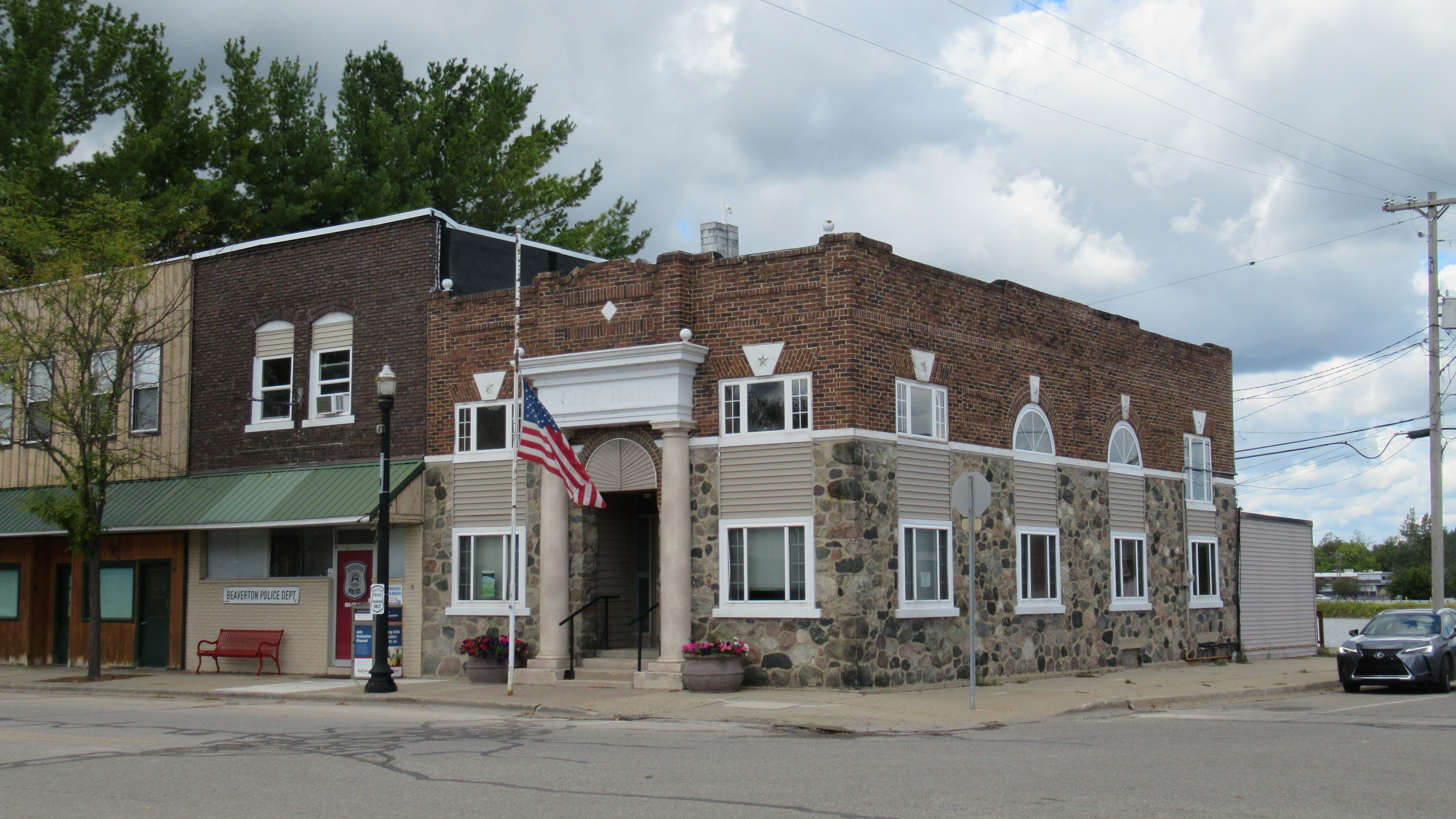
Police department and city hall

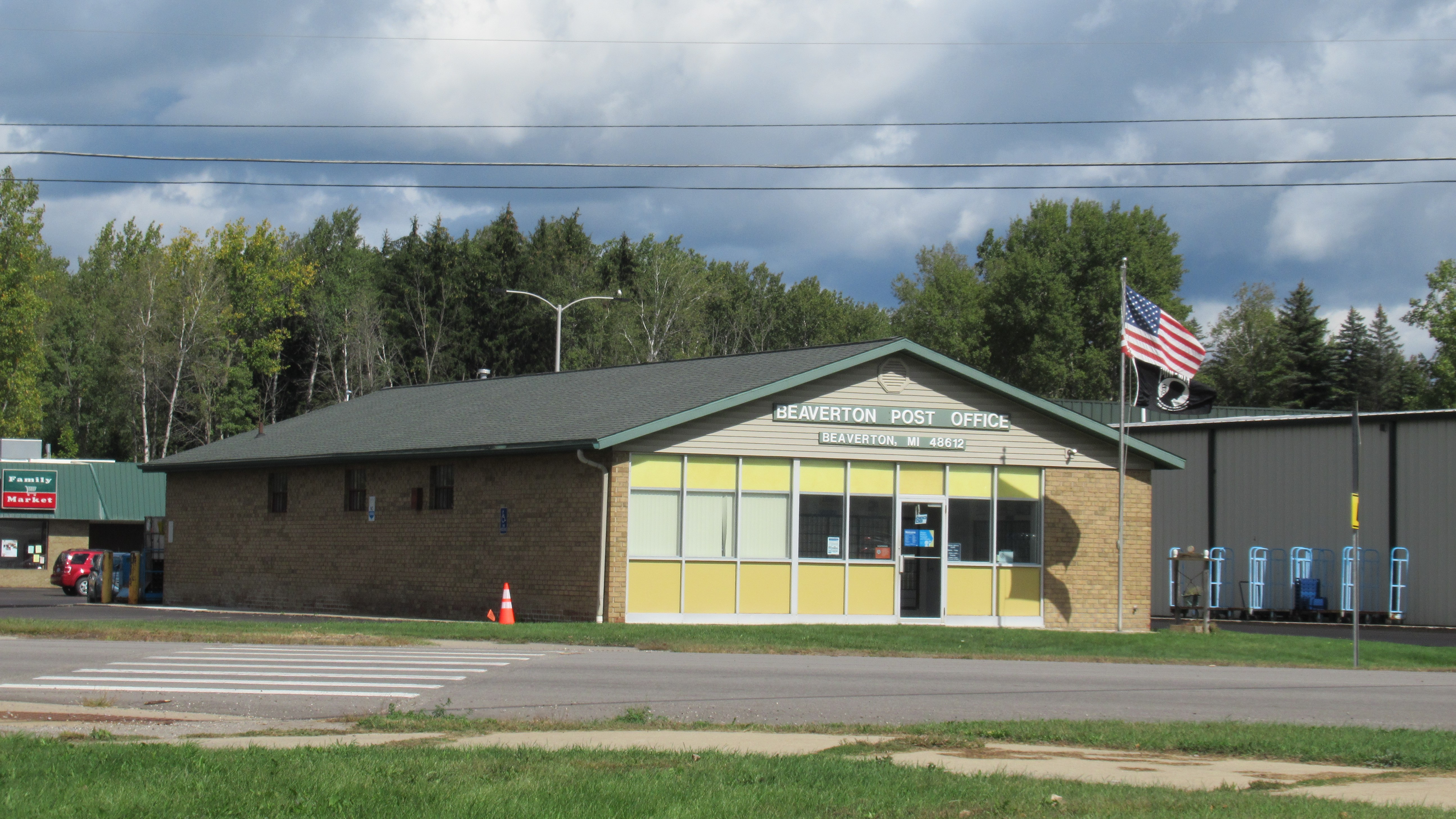
U.S. Post Office in Beaverton

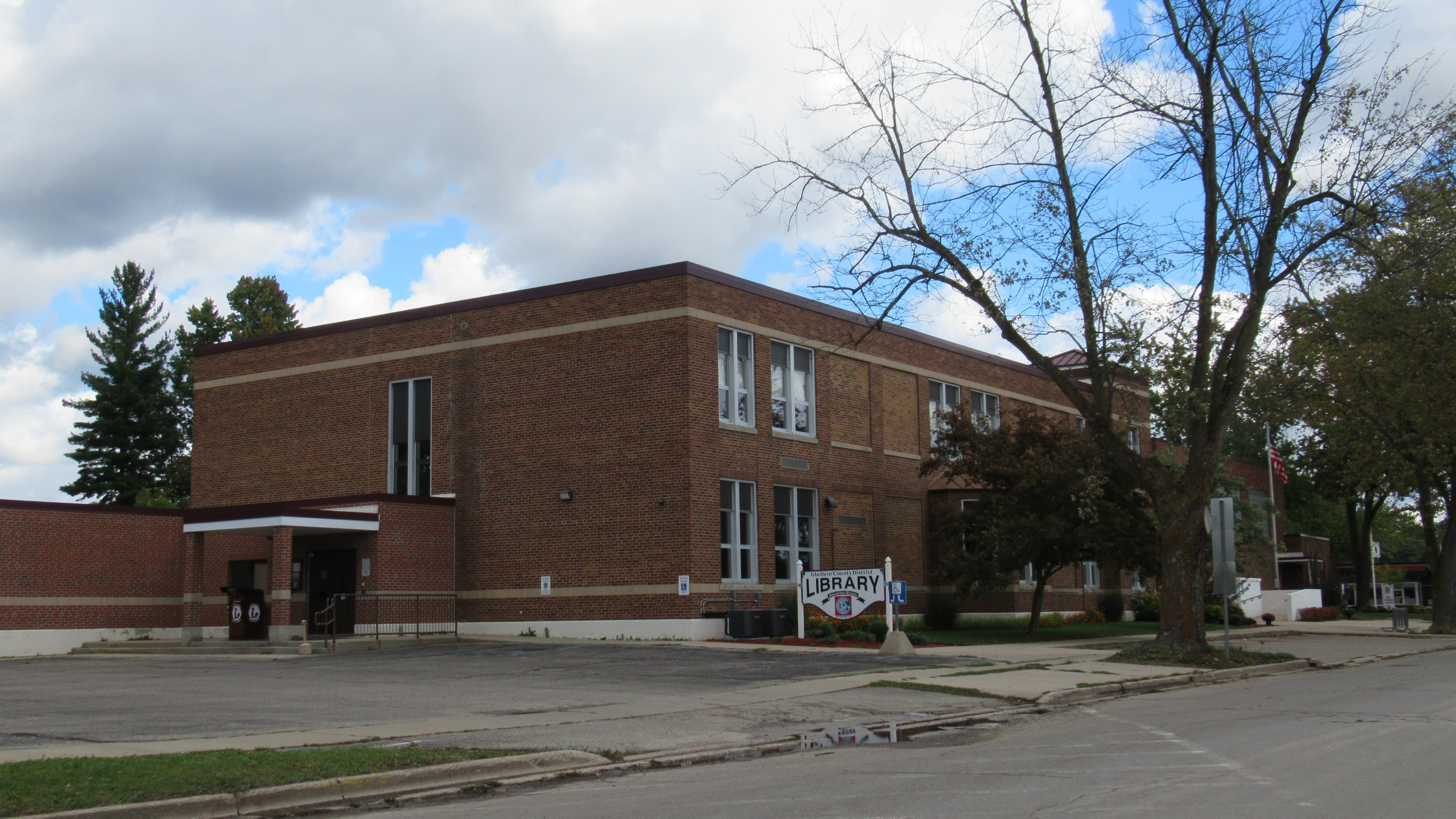
County branch library in Beaverton

== Notable people ==
- Homer Bliss (1904–1970), professional American football player

Roy F. Johnston (1943-present) High school basketball coach All time most winningest coach in MHSAA history

Ryan Longstreth (1990-present) Professional American Baseball Pitcher Drafted in the 40th round of the 2012 draft by the Detroit Tigers after playing college at Central Michigan university. Played 3 seasons in the minors
