= Beaverton Township, Michigan =

- Civil township
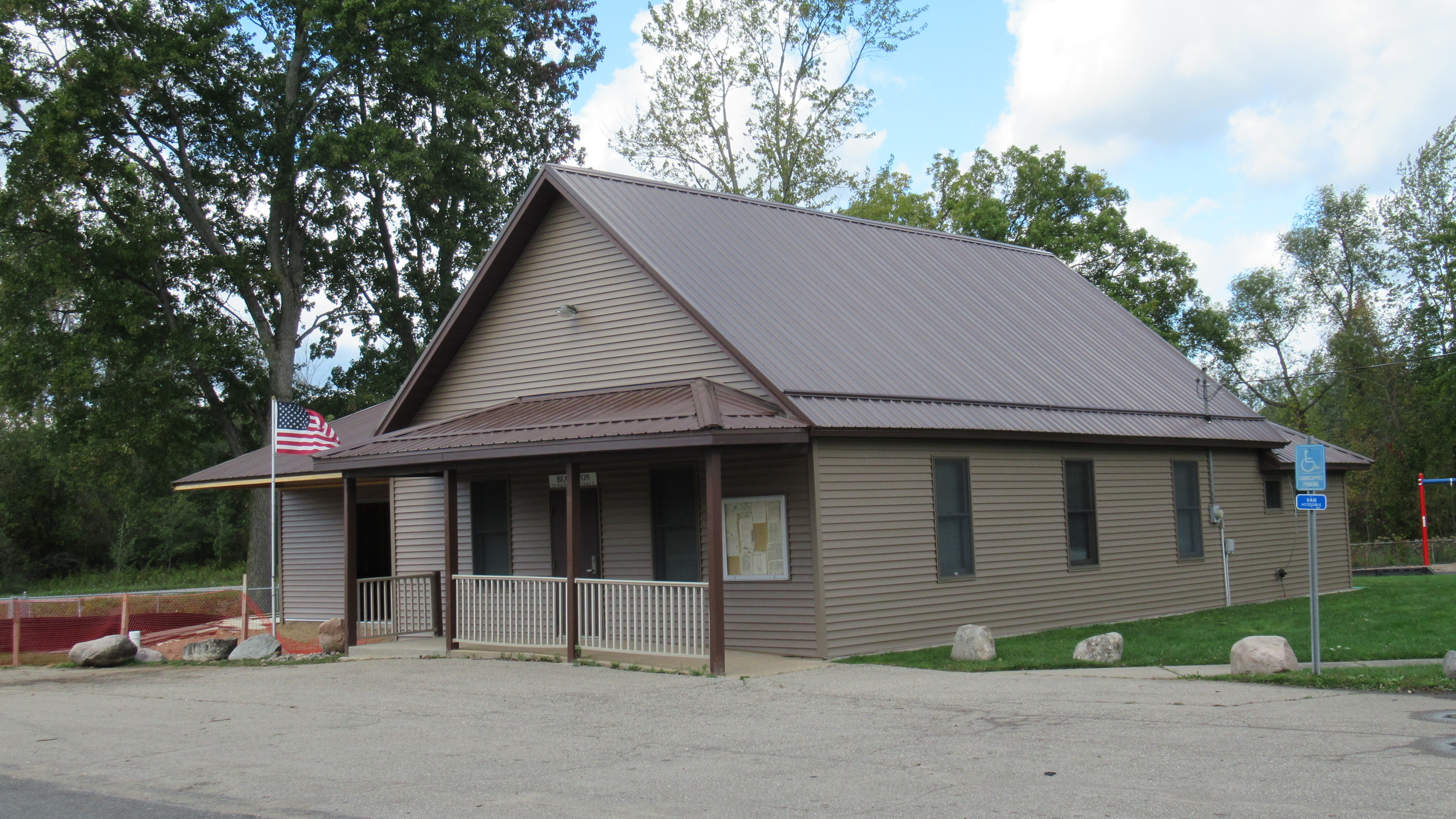
- Beaverton Township Hall

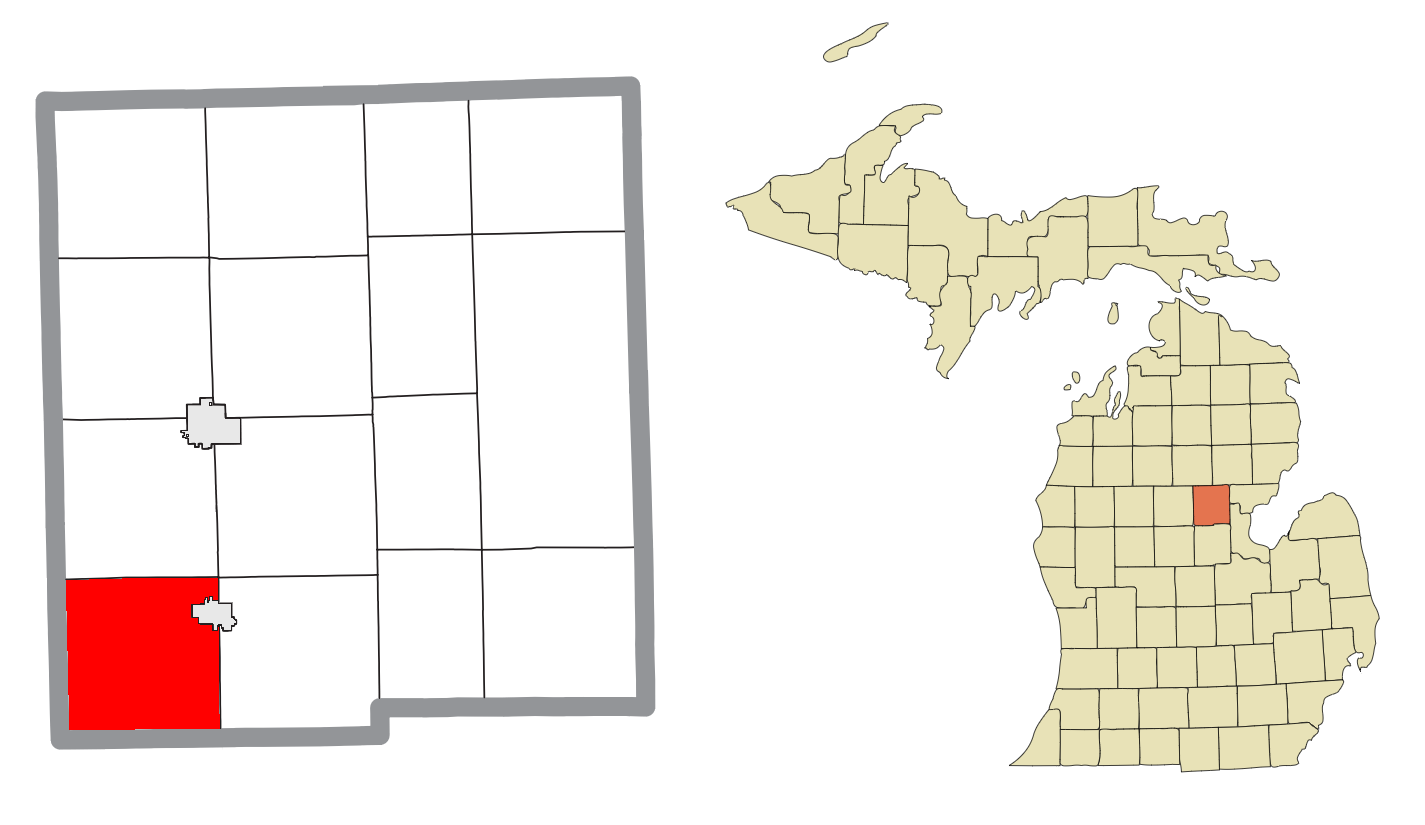
- Location within Gladwin County

- Location within the state of Michigan Location within the United States
- Coordinates: 43°51′54″N 84°31′25″W
- Country: United States
- State: Michigan
- County: Gladwin
- Established: 1896

Government
  - Supervisor: Tim Mickler
  - Clerk: Katery Stoike

Area
  - Total: 35.33 sq mi (91.50 km^{2})
  - Land: 35.03 sq mi (90.73 km^{2})
  - Water: 0.30 sq mi (0.78 km^{2})
- Elevation: 728 ft (222 m)

Population (2020)
  - Total: 1,863
  - Density: 53.18/sq mi (20.53/km^{2})
- Time zone: UTC-5 (Eastern (EST))
  - Summer (DST): UTC-4 (EDT)
- ZIP code(s): 48612 (Beaverton); 48618 (Coleman)
- Area code: 989
- FIPS code: 26-06680
- GNIS feature ID: 1625904
- Website: https://beavertontownship.com/

Beaverton Township is a civil township of Gladwin County in the U.S. state of Michigan. As of the 2020 census, the township population was 1,863.

The city of Beaverton is located to the northeast of the township, but the two are administered autonomously.

== Geography ==
According to the U.S. Census Bureau, the township has a total area of 35.33 square miles (91.50 km^{2}), of which 35.03 square miles (90.73 km^{2}) is land and 0.30 square miles (0.78 km^{2}) (0.85%) is water.

=== Major highways ===
- M-18 runs south–north and forms most of the eastern boundary of the township.

== Demographics ==
As of the census of 2000, there were 1,815 people, 658 households, and 534 families residing in the township. The population density was 51.2 inhabitants per square mile (19.8/km^{2}). There were 750 housing units at an average density of 21.2 per square mile (8.2/km^{2}). The racial makeup of the township was 98.29% White, 0.11% African American, 0.66% Native American, 0.17% Asian, 0.11% from other races, and 0.66% from two or more races. Hispanic or Latino of any race were 0.55% of the population.

There were 658 households, out of which 37.1% had children under the age of 18 living with them, 69.0% were married couples living together, 7.6% had a female householder with no husband present, and 18.8% were non-families. 16.4% of all households were made up of individuals, and 6.7% had someone living alone who was 65 years of age or older. The average household size was 2.74 and the average family size was 3.01.

In the township the population was spread out, with 27.8% under the age of 18, 7.4% from 18 to 24, 29.1% from 25 to 44, 24.1% from 45 to 64, and 11.5% who were 65 years of age or older. The median age was 37 years. For every 100 females, there were 104.6 males. For every 100 females age 18 and over, there were 98.5 males.

The median income for a household in the township was $36,823, and the median income for a family was $40,303. Males had a median income of $35,577 versus $21,691 for females. The per capita income for the township was $15,370. About 9.8% of families and 12.9% of the population were below the poverty line, including 17.5% of those under age 18 and 11.2% of those age 65 or over.
