= Gladwin, Michigan =

- City
- City of Gladwin
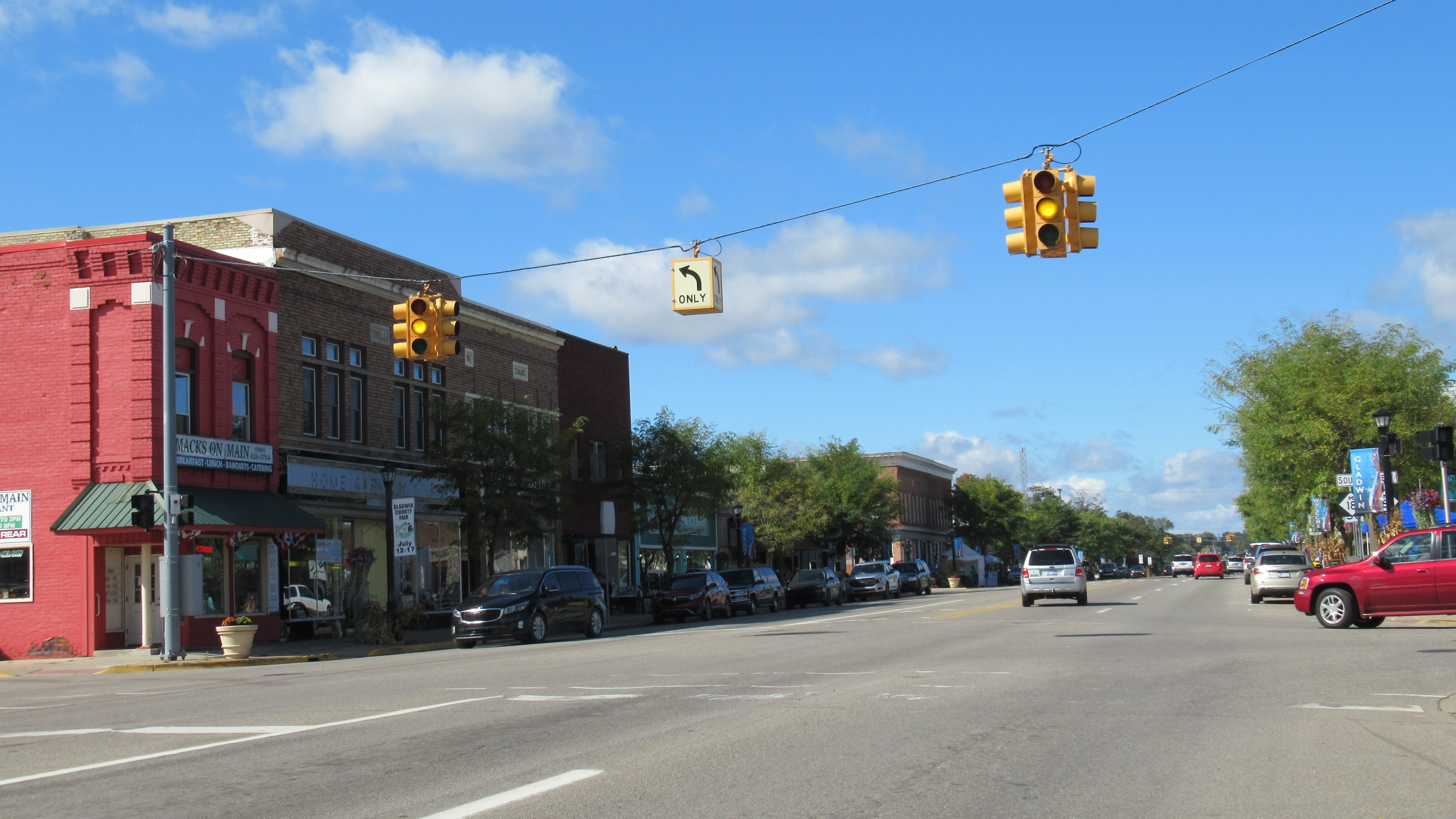
- Looking west along Cedar Avenue (M-18 / M-61)

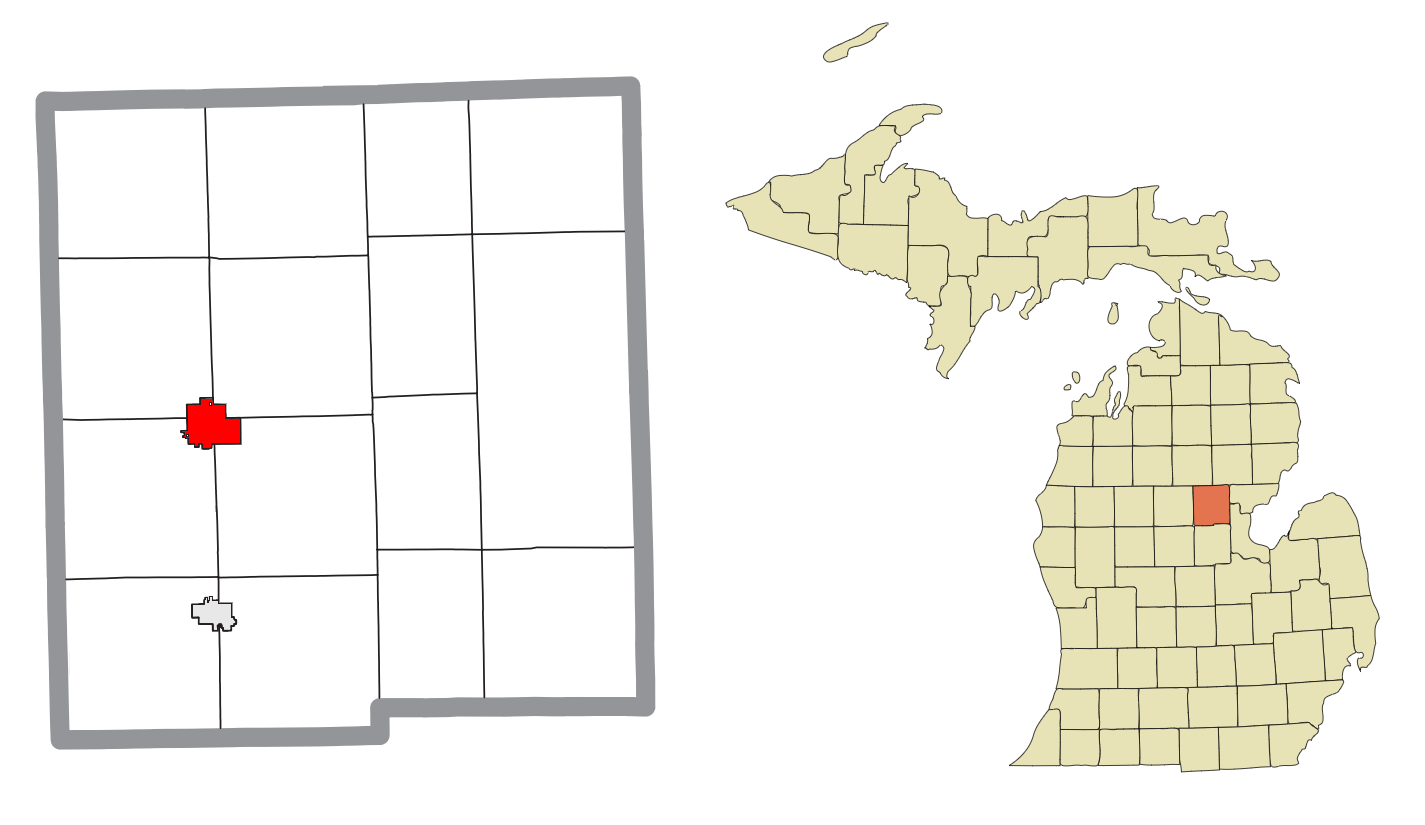
- Location within Gladwin County

- Location within the state of Michigan Location within the United States
- Coordinates: 43°58′59″N 84°29′23″W
- Country: United States
- State: Michigan
- County: Gladwin
- Settled: 1875
- Incorporated: 1885 (village); 1893 (city)

Government
  - Type: Mayor–council
  - Mayor: Darlene Jungman
  - Administrator: Chris Shannon
  - Clerk: Marrieta Andrist

Area
  - Total: 2.90 sq mi (7.51 km^{2})
  - Land: 2.88 sq mi (7.45 km^{2})
  - Water: 0.019 sq mi (0.05 km^{2})
- Elevation: 784 ft (239 m)

Population (2020)
  - Total: 3,069
  - Density: 1,066.6/sq mi (411.83/km^{2})
- Time zone: UTC-5 (Eastern (EST))
  - Summer (DST): UTC-4 (EDT)
- ZIP code(s): 48624
- Area code: 989
- FIPS code: 26-32320
- GNIS feature ID: 0626857
- Website: Official website

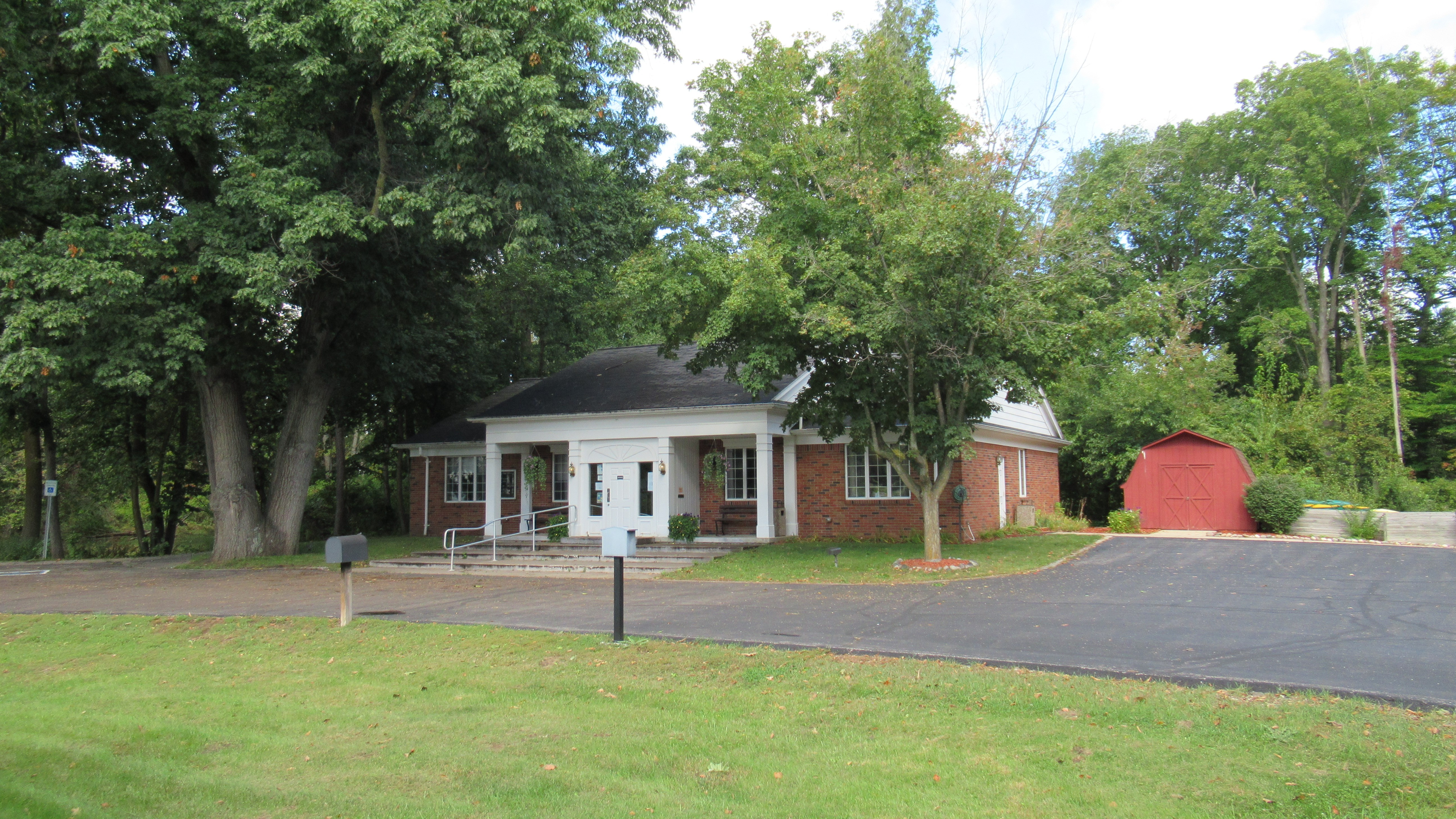
Gladwin City Hall

Gladwin is a city in Gladwin County in the U.S. state of Michigan. The population was 3,069 at the 2020 census. Gladwin is the county seat of Gladwin County. The city is at the southwest corner of Gladwin Township, but the two are administered autonomously.

== History ==
Gladwin county is named for Henry Gladwin, a British military commander at Detroit during Pontiac's War. The county was named in 1831 and organized in 1875. Gladwin had its beginnings in 1875 during the Michigan lumber boom. Situated on the Cedar River, the city was named Cedar until it was discovered that another Michigan town shared the same name. Thereafter, the city was named after the county. The first church in Gladwin was a Methodist church completed on March 31, 1878. In the Fall of 1878, the first schoolhouse was built by Isaac Hanna, later being replaced by a four-room schoolhouse in 1883. Gladwin was incorporated as a village in 1885.

== Geography ==
According to the U.S. Census Bureau, the city has a total area of 2.90 square miles (7.51 km^{2}), of which 2.88 square miles (7.46 km^{2}) is land and 0.02 square miles (0.05 km^{2}) (0.69%) is water.

=== Major highways ===
- M-18
- M-61

=== Climate ===
This climatic region is typified by large seasonal temperature differences, with warm to hot (and often humid) summers and cold (sometimes severely cold) winters. According to the Köppen Climate Classification system, Gladwin has a humid continental climate, abbreviated "Dfb" on climate maps.

Climate data for Gladwin, Michigan (1991–2020 normals, extremes 1892–present)
Month	Jan	Feb	Mar	Apr	May	Jun	Jul	Aug	Sep	Oct	Nov	Dec	Year
Record high °F (°C)	62 (17)	73 (23)	87 (31)	90 (32)	95 (35)	102 (39)	105 (41)	100 (38)	100 (38)	90 (32)	77 (25)	69 (21)	105 (41)
Mean maximum °F (°C)	47.0 (8.3)	49.8 (9.9)	65.4 (18.6)	78.1 (25.6)	86.4 (30.2)	91.5 (33.1)	92.1 (33.4)	90.7 (32.6)	87.0 (30.6)	78.5 (25.8)	64.4 (18.0)	51.9 (11.1)	94.1 (34.5)
Mean daily maximum °F (°C)	29.2 (−1.6)	32.0 (0.0)	42.6 (5.9)	55.5 (13.1)	68.4 (20.2)	78.1 (25.6)	82.0 (27.8)	79.9 (26.6)	72.7 (22.6)	59.5 (15.3)	45.6 (7.6)	34.3 (1.3)	56.7 (13.7)
Daily mean °F (°C)	20.9 (−6.2)	22.2 (−5.4)	31.5 (−0.3)	43.3 (6.3)	55.5 (13.1)	65.5 (18.6)	69.6 (20.9)	67.6 (19.8)	60.1 (15.6)	48.3 (9.1)	36.9 (2.7)	27.1 (−2.7)	45.7 (7.6)
Mean daily minimum °F (°C)	12.7 (−10.7)	12.5 (−10.8)	20.4 (−6.4)	31.0 (−0.6)	42.7 (5.9)	52.8 (11.6)	57.1 (13.9)	55.2 (12.9)	47.4 (8.6)	37.0 (2.8)	28.3 (−2.1)	19.9 (−6.7)	34.7 (1.5)
Mean minimum °F (°C)	−7.8 (−22.1)	−7.7 (−22.1)	0.5 (−17.5)	18.7 (−7.4)	29.4 (−1.4)	39.8 (4.3)	46.4 (8.0)	44.9 (7.2)	35.2 (1.8)	25.3 (−3.7)	13.7 (−10.2)	2.0 (−16.7)	−11.7 (−24.3)
Record low °F (°C)	−28 (−33)	−39 (−39)	−21 (−29)	1 (−17)	21 (−6)	30 (−1)	34 (1)	31 (−1)	22 (−6)	11 (−12)	−8 (−22)	−24 (−31)	−39 (−39)
Average precipitation inches (mm)	2.15 (55)	1.70 (43)	2.05 (52)	3.53 (90)	3.78 (96)	3.46 (88)	3.20 (81)	3.39 (86)	2.79 (71)	3.24 (82)	2.53 (64)	2.20 (56)	34.02 (864)
Average snowfall inches (cm)	13.8 (35)	11.4 (29)	6.7 (17)	2.8 (7.1)	0.0 (0.0)	0.0 (0.0)	0.0 (0.0)	0.0 (0.0)	0.0 (0.0)	0.4 (1.0)	2.8 (7.1)	10.6 (27)	48.5 (123)
Average extreme snow depth inches (cm)	10.2 (26)	10.1 (26)	7.2 (18)	1.7 (4.3)	0.0 (0.0)	0.0 (0.0)	0.0 (0.0)	0.0 (0.0)	0.0 (0.0)	0.2 (0.51)	2.0 (5.1)	6.4 (16)	13.9 (35)
Average precipitation days (≥ 0.01 in)	11.9	8.6	8.5	10.8	11.4	10.2	9.8	9.4	9.5	11.4	11.1	11.0	123.6
Average snowy days (≥ 0.1 in)	8.3	6.3	3.5	1.5	0.0	0.0	0.0	0.0	0.0	0.1	2.4	6.4	28.5
Source: NOAA

== Demographics ==
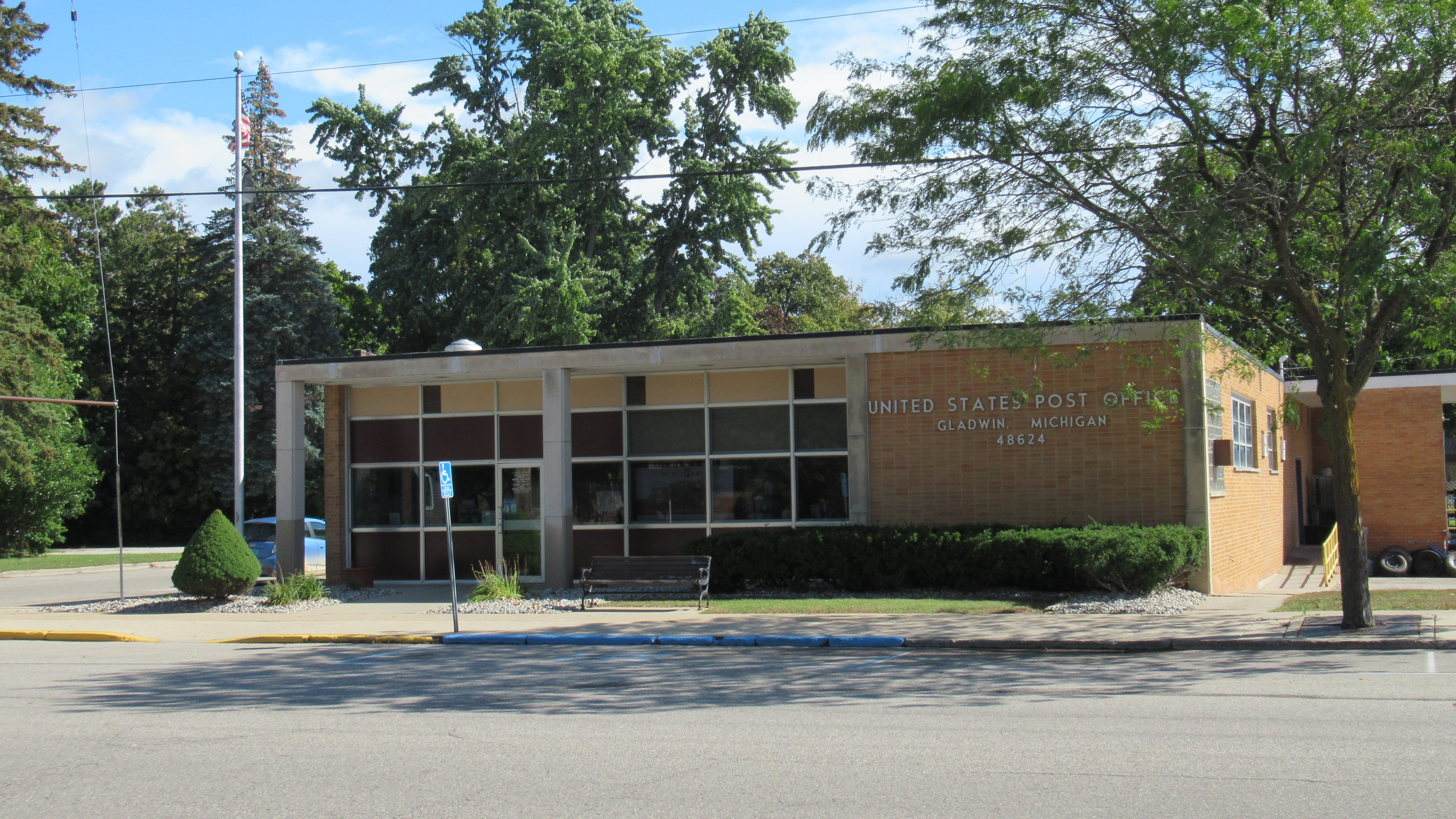
U.S. Post Office in Gladwin

Historical population
Census	Pop.	Note	%±
1890	903		—
1900	775		−14.2%
1910	988		27.5%
1920	1,225		24.0%
1930	1,248		1.9%
1940	1,600		28.2%
1950	1,878		17.4%
1960	2,226		18.5%
1970	2,071		−7.0%
1980	2,479		19.7%
1990	2,682		8.2%
2000	3,001		11.9%
2010	2,933		−2.3%
2020	3,069		4.6%
U.S. Decennial Census

=== 2020 census ===
As of the 2020 census, Gladwin had a population of 3,069. The median age was 40.7 years. 22.7% of residents were under the age of 18 and 23.1% of residents were 65 years of age or older. For every 100 females there were 83.4 males, and for every 100 females age 18 and over there were 80.4 males age 18 and over.

0.0% of residents lived in urban areas, while 100.0% lived in rural areas.

There were 1,323 households in Gladwin, of which 28.4% had children under the age of 18 living in them. Of all households, 34.2% were married-couple households, 18.2% were households with a male householder and no spouse or partner present, and 39.5% were households with a female householder and no spouse or partner present. About 40.4% of all households were made up of individuals and 23.2% had someone living alone who was 65 years of age or older.

There were 1,433 housing units, of which 7.7% were vacant. The homeowner vacancy rate was 2.8% and the rental vacancy rate was 6.6%.

Racial composition as of the 2020 census
Race	Number	Percent
White	2,838	92.5%
Black or African American	22	0.7%
American Indian and Alaska Native	7	0.2%
Asian	17	0.6%
Native Hawaiian and Other Pacific Islander	0	0.0%
Some other race	25	0.8%
Two or more races	160	5.2%
Hispanic or Latino (of any race)	85	2.8%

=== 2010 census ===
As of the census of 2010, there were 2,933 people, 1,261 households, and 680 families living in the city. The population density was 1,014.9 inhabitants per square mile (391.9/km^{2}). There were 1,421 housing units at an average density of 491.7 per square mile (189.8/km^{2}). The racial makeup of the city was 96.8% White, 0.1% African American, 0.4% Native American, 0.7% Asian, 0.5% from other races, and 1.4% from two or more races. Hispanic or Latino of any race were 1.1% of the population.

There were 1,261 households, of which 29.3% had children under the age of 18 living with them, 34.4% were married couples living together, 15.9% had a female householder with no husband present, 3.6% had a male householder with no wife present, and 46.1% were non-families. 42.0% of all households were made up of individuals, and 21.9% had someone living alone who was 65 years of age or older. The average household size was 2.19 and the average family size was 2.96.

The median age in the city was 40.4 years. 23.5% of residents were under the age of 18; 8.9% were between the ages of 18 and 24; 23.6% were from 25 to 44; 21.8% were from 45 to 64; and 22.3% were 65 years of age or older. The gender makeup of the city was 44.9% male and 55.1% female.

=== 2000 census ===
As of the census of 2000, there were 3,001 people, 1,234 households, and 740 families living in the city. The population density was 1,047.5 inhabitants per square mile (404.4/km^{2}). There were 1,329 housing units at an average density of 463.9 per square mile (179.1/km^{2}). The racial makeup of the city was 96.10% White, 0.23% African American, 0.53% Native American, 1.07% Asian, 0.37% from other races, and 1.70% from two or more races. Hispanic or Latino of any race were 1.50% of the population.

There were 1,234 households, out of which 31.3% had children under the age of 18 living with them, 42.3% were married couples living together, 14.1% had a female householder with no husband present, and 40.0% were non-families. 36.1% of all households were made up of individuals, and 19.8% had someone living alone who was 65 years of age or older. The average household size was 2.28 and the average family size was 2.97.

In the city, the population was spread out, with 24.9% under the age of 18, 8.0% from 18 to 24, 25.9% from 25 to 44, 19.3% from 45 to 64, and 21.9% who were 65 years of age or older. The median age was 38 years. For every 100 females, there were 82.2 males. For every 100 females age 18 and over, there were 76.9 males.

The median income for a household in the city was $29,598, and the median income for a family was $38,269. Males had a median income of $35,040 versus $19,571 for females. The per capita income for the city was $16,370. About 9.3% of families and 11.7% of the population were below the poverty line, including 13.7% of those under age 18 and 9.1% of those age 65 or over.

== Notable people ==
- 2nd Mile, Christian rock and worship band founded in Gladwin
- Jim Kern, Major League Baseball pitcher for several teams from 1974 to 1986
- NF, rapper
- Debbie Stabenow, U.S. senator and U.S. representative for Michigan
