= National Register of Historic Places listings in Midland County, Michigan =

The following is a list of Registered Historic Places in Midland County, Michigan.
This National Park Service list is complete through NPS recent listings posted May 15, 2026.

	Name on the Register	Image	Date listed	Location	City or town	Description
1	Ball Road-Little Salt Creek Bridge	Ball Road-Little Salt Creek Bridge	December 17, 1999 (#99001533)	Ball Rd. over Little Salt Creek; 43°31′00″N 84°33′23″W	Jasper Township	The Midland County Drain Commission demolished the bridge some time after 2006. No replacement span was constructed.
2	Howard Ball House	Howard Ball House	December 4, 1989 (#89001432)	1411 W. St. Andrews; 43°37′29″N 84°14′37″W	Midland	
3	Mr. and Mrs Frank Boonstra House	Mr. and Mrs Frank Boonstra House	June 22, 2004 (#04000644)	1401 Helen St. 43°37′26″N 84°14′27″W	Midland	
4	Bradley House	Bradley House	July 31, 1972 (#72000642)	3200 Cook Rd. 43°37′40″N 84°16′00″W	Midland	
5	Mr. and Mrs. Louis P. Butenschoen House	Mr. and Mrs. Louis P. Butenschoen House	June 22, 2004 (#04000643)	1212 Helen St. 43°37′29″N 84°14′29″W	Midland	
6	Calvin A. and Alta Koch Campbell House	Calvin A. and Alta Koch Campbell House	June 22, 2004 (#04000642)	1210 W. Park Dr. 43°37′21″N 84°14′58″W	Midland	
7	Joseph A. Cavanagh House	Joseph A. Cavanagh House	December 4, 1989 (#89001434)	415 W. Main; 43°36′55″N 84°14′56″W	Midland	
8	Donald L. Conner House	Donald L. Conner House	December 4, 1989 (#89001439)	2705 Manor; 43°37′35″N 84°13′57″W	Midland	
9	Oscar C. Diehl House	Oscar C. Diehl House	December 4, 1989 (#89001436)	919 E. Park; 43°37′12″N 84°14′59″W	Midland	
10	Alden B. Dow House and Studio	Alden B. Dow House and Studio	June 29, 1989 (#89001167)	315 Post St. 43°37′28″N 84°15′13″W	Midland	This house and studio were the residence and acknowledged masterpiece of 20th century architect Alden B. Dow. The quality and originality of his work, as well as his association with Frank Lloyd Wright, have earned him lasting national recognition.
11	Herbert H. Dow House	Herbert H. Dow House	May 11, 1976 (#76001033)	1038 W. Main St. 43°36′59″N 84°14′50″W	Midland	A home of Herbert H. Dow
12	George Greene House	George Greene House	December 4, 1989 (#89001441)	115 W. Sugnet; 43°37′59″N 84°14′30″W	Midland	
13	Alden Hanson House	Alden Hanson House	December 4, 1989 (#89001443)	1605 W. St. Andrews; 43°37′29″N 84°14′45″W	Midland	
14	Sheldon Heath House	Sheldon Heath House	December 4, 1989 (#89001438)	1505 W. St. Andrews; 43°37′29″N 84°14′40″W	Midland	
15	Donald and Louise Clark Irish House		June 22, 2004 (#04000641)	1801 W. Sugnet Rd. 43°38′00″N 84°15′01″W	Midland	
16	F.W. Lewis House	F.W. Lewis House	December 4, 1989 (#89001435)	2913 Manor; 43°37′40″N 84°13′51″W	Midland	
17	Charles MacCallum House	Charles MacCallum House	December 4, 1989 (#89001442)	1227 W. Sugnet; 43°38′01″N 84°14′29″W	Midland	
18	Midland County Courthouse	Midland County Courthouse	March 13, 1986 (#86000381)	301 W. Main St. 43°36′50″N 84°14′50″W	Midland	
19	North Saginaw Road-Salt River Bridge		December 17, 1999 (#99001532)	Perrine Rd. over Sturgeon Cr. 43°40′22″N 84°16′38″W	Larkin Township	This bridge was moved in 2001 from its location at the time of nomination (North Saginaw Rd. over the Salt River) to the present location, carrying Perrine Road over Sturgeon Creek.
20	Odd Fellows Hall	Odd Fellows Hall	January 8, 2026 (#100012506)	116 Rodd St. 43°36′44″N 84°14′37″W	Midland	
21	Oxbow Archeological District		June 19, 1973 (#73002156)	Address Restricted; 43°36′15″N 84°16′42″W	Midland Township	Also known as the Chippewa Nature Center Archaeological District, this site is located on the grounds of the Chippewa Nature Center.
22	James T. Pardee House	James T. Pardee House	December 4, 1989 (#89001431)	812 W. Main St. 43°37′09″N 84°15′06″W	Midland	
23	Parents' and Children's Schoolhouse	Parents' and Children's Schoolhouse	July 25, 1996 (#96000800)	1505 Crane Ct. 43°37′26″N 84°14′42″W	Midland	
24	Charles and Mary Kempf Penhaligen House	Charles and Mary Kempf Penhaligen House	June 22, 2004 (#04000640)	1203 W. Sugnet Rd. 43°37′59″N 84°14′27″W	Midland	
25	Mr. and Mrs. Robert C. Reinke House	Mr. and Mrs. Robert C. Reinke House	June 22, 2004 (#04000639)	33 Lexington Court; 43°38′12″N 84°13′18″W	Midland	
26	Robert E. and Barbara Schwartz House	Robert E. and Barbara Schwartz House	September 26, 2013 (#13000799)	3201 W. Sugnet Road; 43°38′04″N 84°15′56″W	Midland	
27	Earl Stein House	Earl Stein House	December 4, 1989 (#89001437)	209 Revere; 43°37′04″N 84°15′05″W	Midland	
28	John S. Whitman House	John S. Whitman House	December 4, 1989 (#89001440)	2407 Manor; 43°37′28″N 84°14′07″W	Midland	

== See also ==
- List of Michigan State Historic Sites in Midland County
- List of National Historic Landmarks in Michigan
- National Register of Historic Places listings in Michigan
- Listings in neighboring counties: Bay, Clare, Gratiot, Isabella, Saginaw
