= Alden Dow Building Co. =

American firm

The Alden Dow Building Co. was an American firm associated with architect Alden B. Dow.

A number of its works are listed on the U.S. National Register of Historic Places.

Works include (with variations in attribution):

- Mr. and Mrs Frank Boonstra House, 1401 Helen St. Midland, MI (Dow, Alden B.; Dow, Alden, Building Co.), NRHP-listed
- Mr. and Mrs. Louis P. Butenschoen House, 1212 Helen St. Midland, MI (Dow, Alden B.; Dow, Alden, Building Co.), NRHP-listed
- Calvin A. and Alta Koch Campbell House, 1210 W. Park Dr. Midland, MI (Dow, Alden B.; Dow, Alden, Building Co.), NRHP-listed
- Donald and Louise Clark Irish House, 1801 W. Sugnet Rd. Midland, MI (Dow, Alden B.; Dow, Alden, Building Co.), NRHP-listed
- Charles and Mary Kempf Penhaligen House, 1203 W. Sugnet Rd. Midland, MI (Dow, Alden B.; Dow, Alden, Building Co.), NRHP-listed
- Mr. and Mrs. Robert C. Reinke House, 33 Lexington Court Midland, MI (Dow, Alden B.; Dow, Alden Building Co.), NRHP-listed

Alden B. Dow did many works not associated with the Alden Dow Building Co. NRHP-listed works of Alden B. Dow include:

- Howard Ball House, 1411 W. St. Andrews Midland, MI (Dow, Alden B.), NRHP-listed
- Joseph A. Cavanagh House, 415 W. Main Midland, MI (Dow, Alden B.), NRHP-listed
- Donald L. Conner House, 2705 Manor Midland, MI (Dow, Alden B.), NRHP-listed
- Oscar C. Diehl House, 919 E. Park Midland, MI (Dow, Alden B.), NRHP-listed
- Alden B. Dow House and Studio, 315 Post St. Midland, MI (Dow, Alden B.), NRHP-listed
- Alden B. Dow Office and Lake Jackson City Hall, 101 S. Parking Pl. Lake Jackson, TX (Dow, Alden B.), NRHP-listed
- George Greene House, 115 W. Sugnet Midland, MI (Dow, Alden B.), NRHP-listed
- Alden Hanson House, 1605 W. St. Andrews Midland, MI (Dow, Alden B.), NRHP-listed
- Sheldon Heath House, 1505 W. St. Andrews Midland, MI (Dow, Alden B.), NRHP-listed
- F. W. Lewis House, 2913 Manor Midland, MI (Dow, Alden B.), NRHP-listed
- Charles MacCallum House, 1227 W. Sugnet Midland, MI (Dow, Alden B.), NRHP-listed
- James T. Pardee House, 812 W. Main St. Midland, MI (Dow, Alden B.), NRHP-listed
- Parents' and Children's Schoolhouse, 1505 Crane Ct. Midland, MI (Dow, Alden B.), NRHP-listed
- LeRoy Smith House, 9503 Frank St. Algonac, MI (Dow, Alden B.), NRHP-listed
- Earl Stein House, 209 Revere Midland, MI (Dow, Alden B.), NRHP-listed
- John S. Whitman House, 2407 Manor Midland, MI (Dow, Alden B.), NRHP-listed
