= William and Helen Koerting House =

Historic house in Indiana, United States

- U.S. National Register of Historic Places
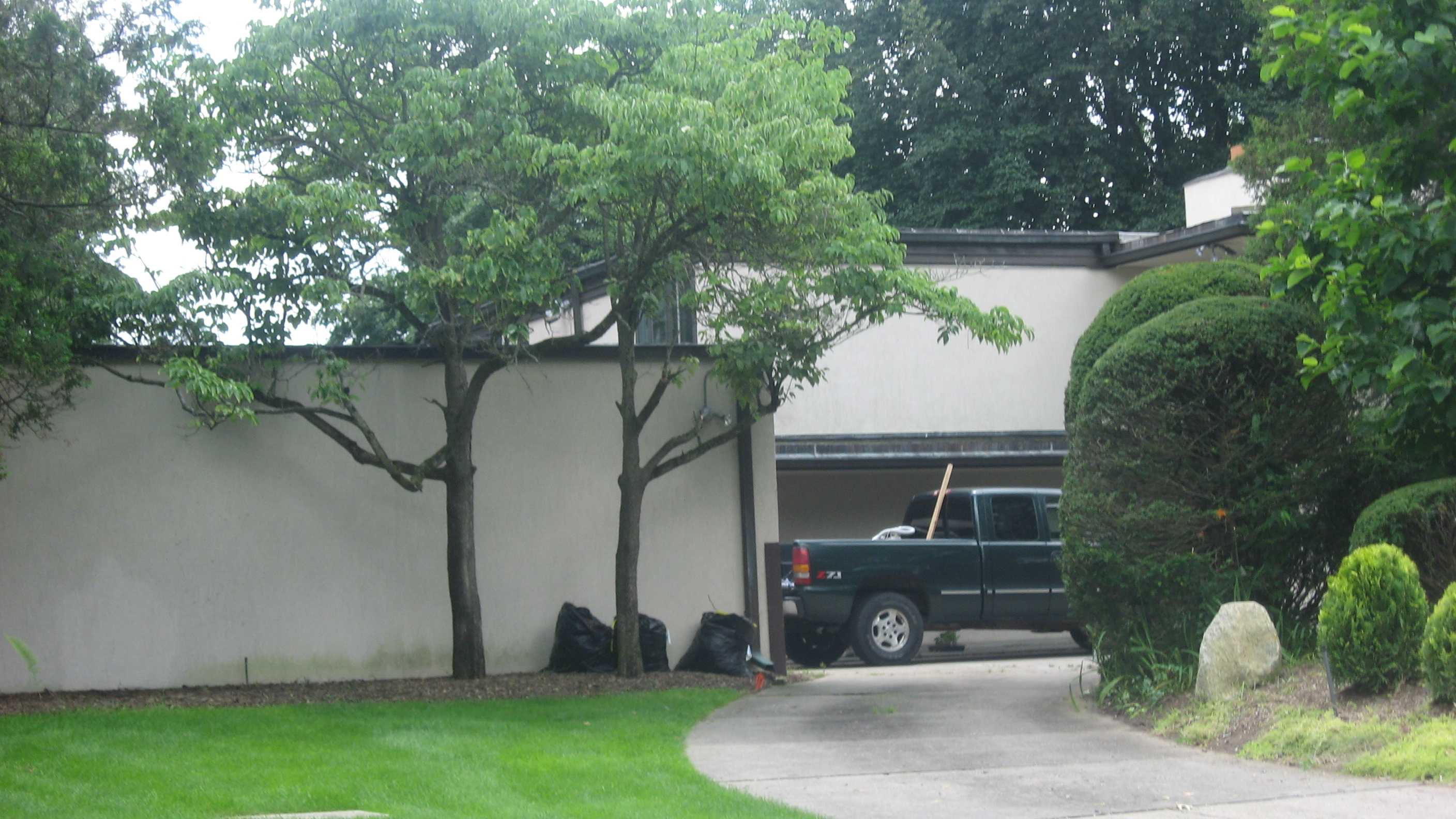
- William and Helen Koerting House, July 2013

- Location within Indiana Location within the United States
- Location: 2625 Greenleaf Blvd., Elkhart, Indiana
- Coordinates: 41°41′49″N 85°56′14″W
- Area: 1.2 acres (0.49 ha)
- Built: 1937
- Architect: Dow, Alden
- Architectural style: International Style
- NRHP reference No.: 09001128
- Added to NRHP: December 22, 2009

William and Helen Koerting House is a historic home located at Elkhart, Indiana. It was designed by architect Alden B. Dow (1904–1983) and built in 1937. It is a one- and two-story, International Style stuccoed dwelling. It features large planes of glass in dark bronze colored frames, a flat roof with copper flashing, and attached garage.

It was added to the National Register of Historic Places in 2009.
