= Midland Center for the Arts =

Performing arts center in Midland, Michigan

Coordinates: 43.6248°N 84.24973°W

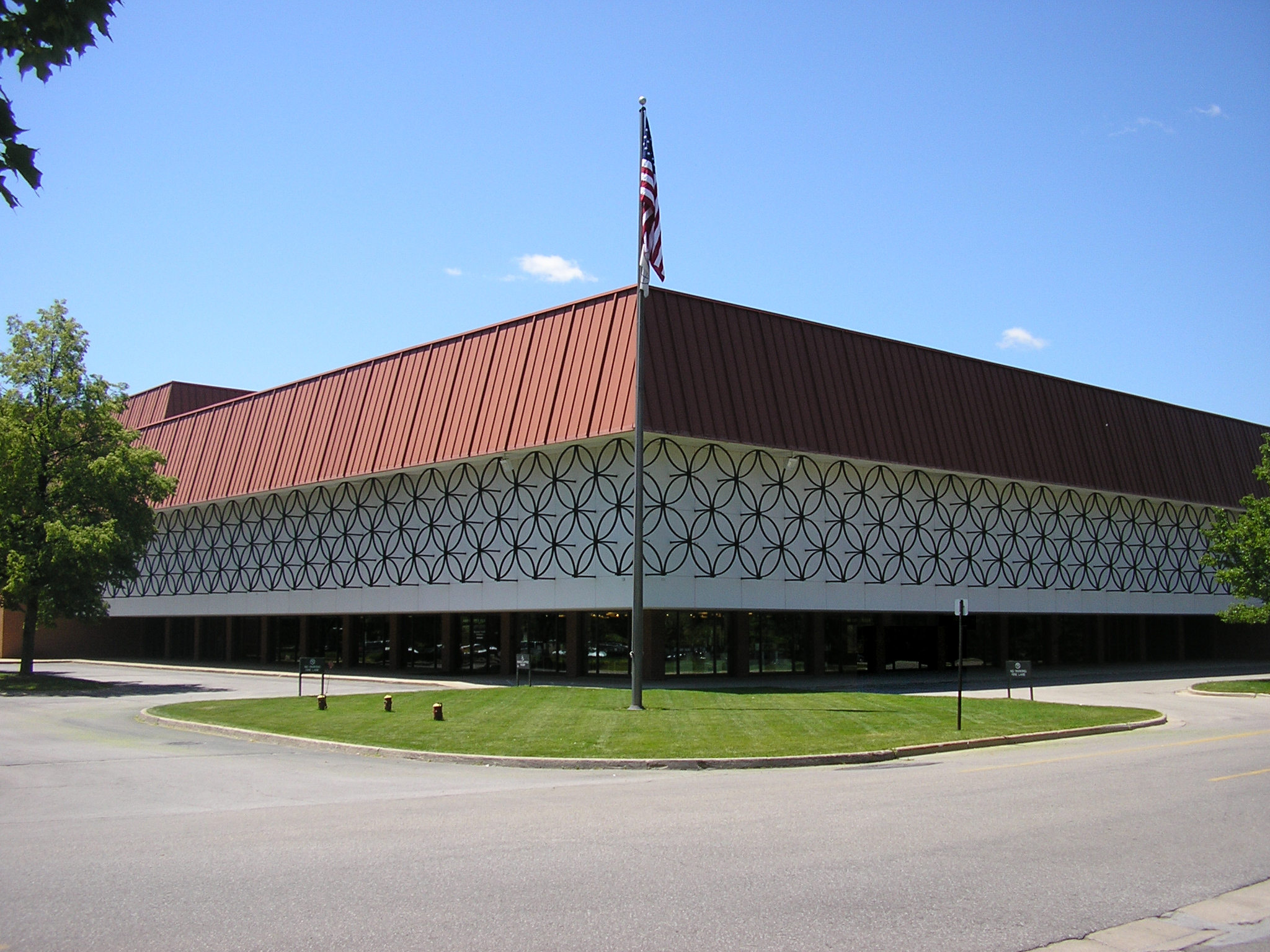
The Midland Center for the Arts

Midland Center for the Arts is a performing arts center and museum complex located in on 1801 Saint Andrews St in Midland, Michigan. It includes two performance venues, two museums, art studios, lecture halls and a historical campus. The member groups at the center are the Alden B. Dow Museum of Science & Art, Center Stage Choirs, Center Stage Theatre, MATRIX:MIDLAND, Midland County Historical Society and Midland Symphony Orchestra.

The performance venues feature a 1500-seat auditorium and a 400-seat theater for shows and events.

The design and history of the building includes some of Alden B. Dow's architecture throughout.

== Alden B. Dow Museum of Science & Art ==
The Alden B. Dow Museum of Science & Art focuses on the visual arts and science and is an accredited member of the American Alliance of Museums. The museum features a hands-on Hall of Ideas and changing exhibitions in the 14,000 sq. ft of gallery space, including traveling exhibitions. The museum also offers classes, family days, community outreach programs, art fairs and special events.

== Midland County Historical Society ==
The Midland County Historical Society operates the 1874 Bradley Home and the Herbert H. Dow Historical Museum in Heritage Park.

The Society also operates the Doan History Center, officially known as the Herbert D. Doan Midland County History Center. The Center includes a hands-on gallery of interactive exhibits of Midland County history, a history research library and an archival collection of Midland County artifacts.
