= F.W. Lewis House =

- F. W. Lewis House
- U.S. National Register of Historic Places
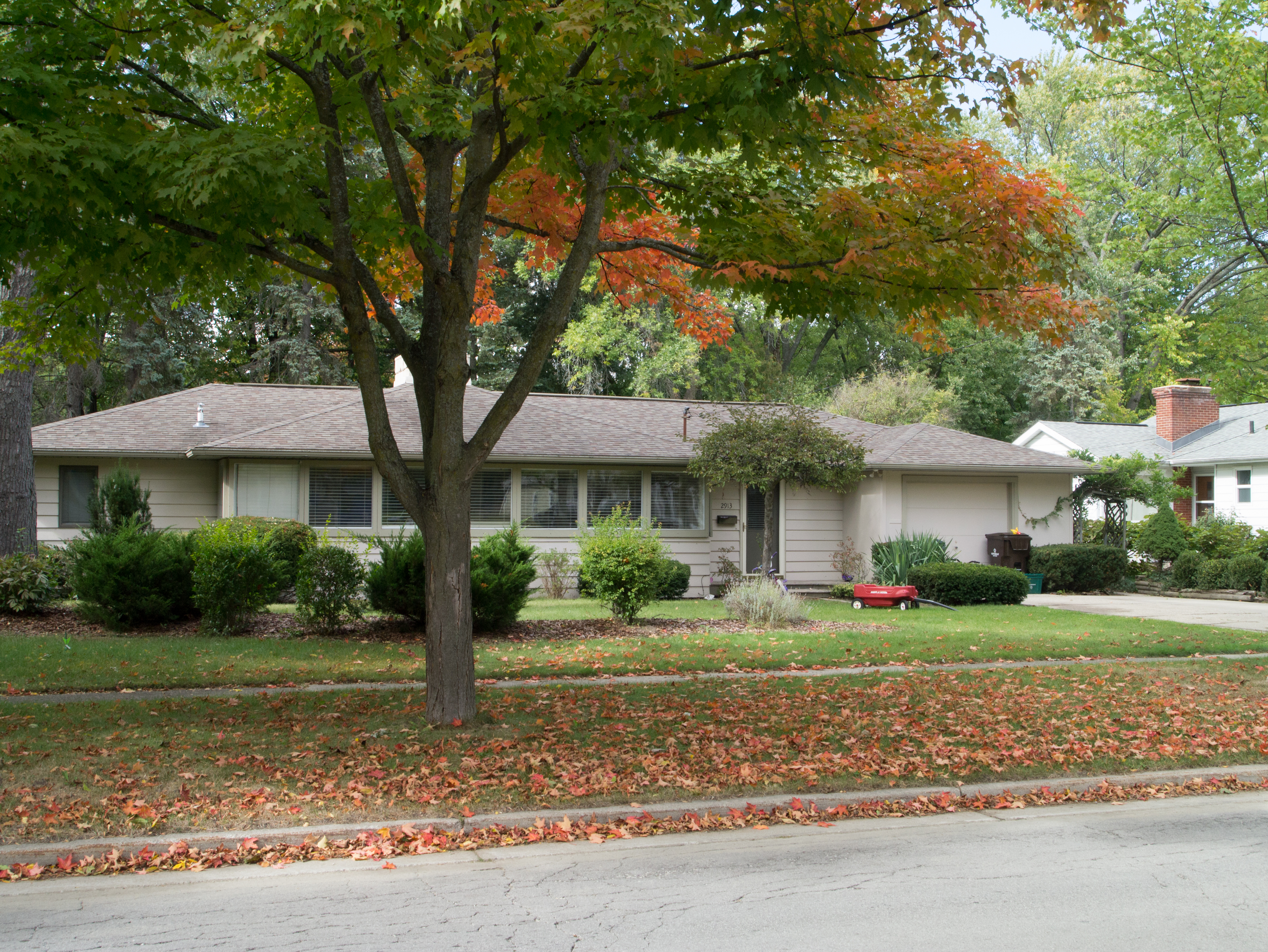
- Interactive map
- Location: 2913 Manor, Midland, Michigan
- Coordinates: 43°37′40″N 84°13′51″W
- Area: less than one acre
- Built: 1933
- Architect: Alden B. Dow
- Architectural style: International Style
- MPS: Residential Architecture of Alden B. Dow in Midland 1933--1938 MPS
- NRHP reference No.: 89001435
- Added to NRHP: December 4, 1989

The F. W. Lewis House is a single-family home located at 2913 Manor Street in Midland, Michigan. It was listed on the National Register of Historic Places in 1989.

== History ==
F.W. Lewis was an accountant at the Dow Chemical Company. In 1933, he hired architect Alden B. Dow to design this home. It was Dow's first foray into a low-priced home design, something that interested the architect throughout his life. Clapboard siding was added to the house some time in the 1960s. A single car garage was added about the same time.

== Description ==
The F. W. Lewis House is a single-story, 900 square foot house configured in a square. The house is topped with a broad hip roof, and a unit block chimney, which also serves to delineate the interior spaces of the house into public and private areas. The exterior is clad in clapboard, over the original masonite sheets. A band of casement windows runs across the front. Each of the casement windows pivot from the top for ventilation. On the interior, the front contains a living room and kitchen/dining area, and the rear contains two bedrooms.
