= Howard Ball House =

Historic place in Michigan

- U.S. National Register of Historic Places
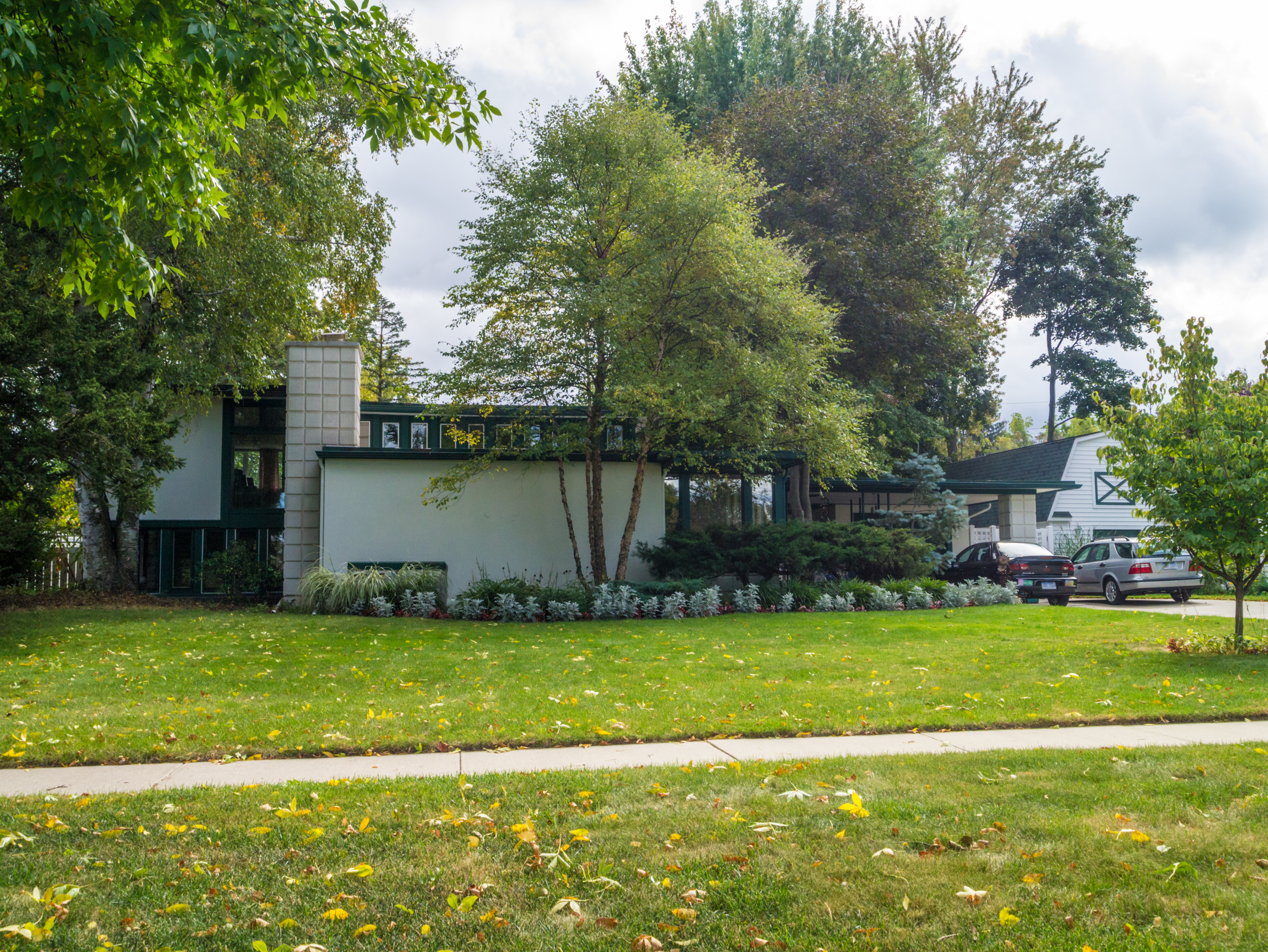
- Interactive map
- Location: 1411 W. St. Andrews, Midland, Michigan
- Coordinates: 43°37′29″N 84°14′37″W
- Area: less than one acre
- Built: 1935
- Built by: W.R. Collinson
- Architect: Alden B. Dow
- Architectural style: International Style
- MPS: Residential Architecture of Alden B. Dow in Midland 1933--1938 MPS
- NRHP reference No.: 89001432
- Added to NRHP: December 4, 1989

The Howard Ball House is a single-family home located at 1411 West St. Andrews Street in Midland, Michigan. It was listed on the National Register of Historic Places in 1989.

== History ==
Howard Ball was an employee in the sales department at Dow Chemical Company. In 1935, he purchased a lot in a newly developed area at one end of the local golf course. Ball hired architect Alden B. Dow (his cousin) to design this house, and contractor W.R. Collinson to build it. Construction began in the summer of 1935, and was completed the next year. An addition was constructed in 1938.

== Description ==
The Howard Ball House is a split level unit block structure, made from several rectangular elements pieced together. A corner of the living room, containing tall windows with prominent wooden mullions, projects outward toward the street. The remainder of the front of the house is a broad stucco wall, beyond which is another window grouping set behind the main elevation. Wooden fascia extends horizontally beyond the house into the carport and onto a separate garage. The garage, although a separate structure, is stylistically and visually tied to the house. A narrow window course sits above the main level at the rear of the house, and is part of the addition.

On the opposite side of the house from the garage, a large unit block chimney provides a vertical counterpoint to the strong horizontal planes of the overall structure. The interior continues the complex interplay of rectangular sections seen on the exterior through a series of staggered levels. The main door leads directly into the living room, which sits at mid-level between the dining room, kitchen and service rooms below, and two bedrooms above. The 1938 addition enlarged the kitchen and added a study on the lower level with a bedroom above it. The house is one of three unit block structures designed by Dow situated near one another on West St. Andrews Road, all in close proximity to the Midland Country Club, also a Dow design. In a 1942 issue of Pencil Points, architecture critic Talbot Hamlin wrote that the Ball house gives "a new sense of the dynamic interrelation of rectangular forms, a kind of geometric poetry."
