= Odd Fellows Hall (Midland, Michigan) =

- U.S. National Register of Historic Places
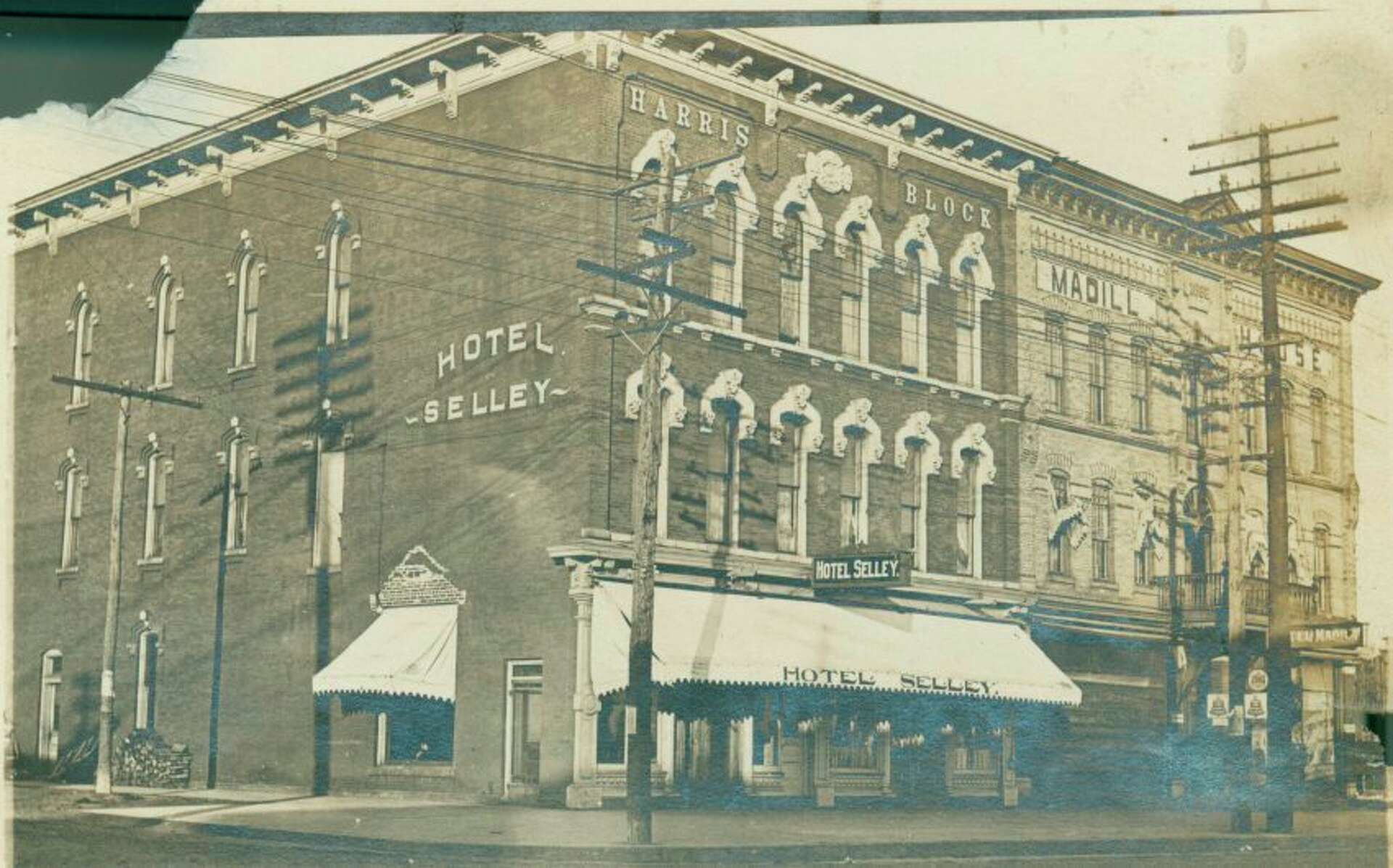
- Odd Fellows Hall c. 1910 (note "Hotel Selley")
- Interactive map
- Location: 116 Rodd St., Midland, Michigan
- Coordinates: 43°36′44″N 84°14′37″W
- Built: 1876
- Architectural style: Italianate
- NRHP reference No.: 100012506
- Added to NRHP: January 8, 2026

The Odd Fellows Hall (also known as the Harris Block or Hotel Selley) is commercial building and former a social club located at 116 Rodd Street in Midland, Michigan, United States. It was listed on the National Register of Historic Places in 2026.

== History ==
In 1874, grocer William Harris constructed a two-story wooden building at this site to house his business. In 1876, that building, along with much of Midland's downtown, was destroyed in a catastrophic fire. Harris constructed a new three-story brick building that same year, calling it the Harris Block. In addition to Harris's business, multiple other businesses occupied the building's storefronts in subsequent years. The upper floors were used as meeting rooms for a variety of organizations. Harris moved to Grand Blanc, Michigan in the early 1880s, and by 1890 the building was known as the Stranahan Block.

During this time, different businesses rented out the commercial spaces, and different organizations used the upstairs meeting rooms. This included the Midland Odd Fellows Lodge No. 418, which was organized in 1891. In 1901, George Selley, who owned a saloon on the first floor, purchased the building. In 1906, he refurbished the building into a hotel, naming it the Hotel Selley. He sold the building in 1910 and the hotel operated until 1914.

When the building operated as a hotel, the Odd Fellows Lodge No. 418 met in another building. In 1914, the Lodge purchased the Hotel Selley, converting the upper floors into permanent space for the club. The first floor storefronts continued to be leased to commercial businesses. In 1963, a single story addition was constructed on the rear of the building. The Odd Fellows Lodge maintained ownership of the building until 2022.

In 2023, the building was purchased by RDS Management. The company plans to redevelop the building into a mixed-use space, combining commercial space on the first floor and apartments above.

== Description ==
The Odd Fellows Hall is a three-story brick Italianate building with a flat roof. The first floor is divided into two commercial storefronts. The upper floors have six windows in each story. The windows are tall and topped with stone hoods. Brick pilasters are located on each side of the facade.
