= Mr. and Mrs. Louis P. Butenschoen House =

- U.S. National Register of Historic Places
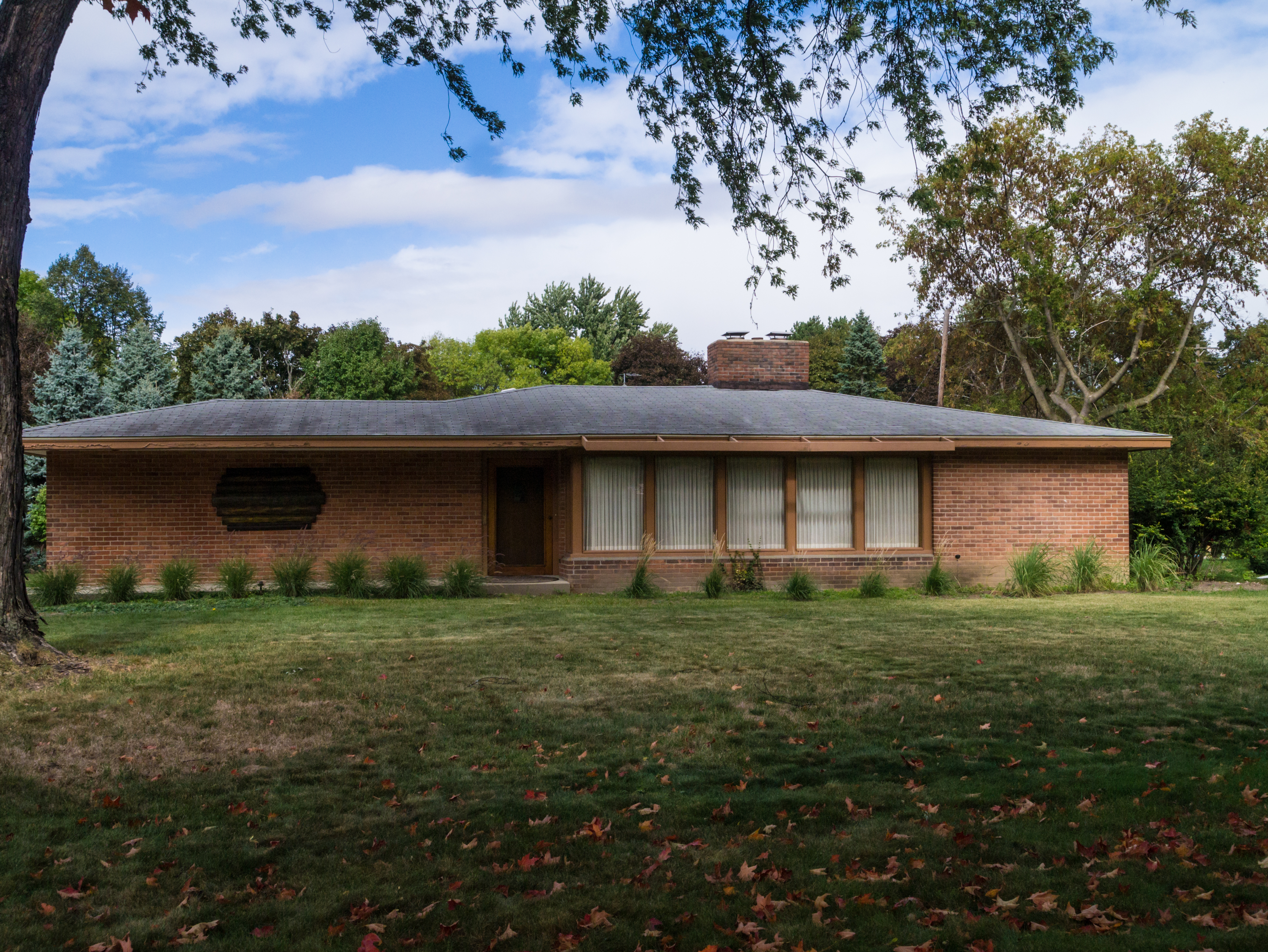
- Interactive map
- Location: 1212 Helen St., Midland, Michigan
- Coordinates: 43°37′29″N 84°14′29″W
- Area: less than one acre
- Built: 1941
- Built by: Alden Dow Building Co.
- Architect: Alden B. Dow
- Architectural style: Modern Movement
- MPS: Residential Architecture of Alden B. Dow in Midland, Michigan MPS AD
- NRHP reference No.: 04000643
- Added to NRHP: June 22, 2004

The Mr. and Mrs. Louis P. Butenschoen House is a single-family home located at 1212 Helen Street in Midland, Michigan. It was listed on the National Register of Historic Places in 2004.

== History ==
Louis Butenschoen was a technological chemical engineer at Dow Chemical Company. In 1941, the Butenschoens hired architect Alden B. Dow to design this house. They signed a contract with the Alden Dow Building Company to build it, and construction was completed in the summer of 1942. The Butenschoens lived in the house well into the 21st century.

== Description ==
The Butenschoen House is a single-story brick house. It is located on a spacious corner lot on the Midland Country Club, set well back from the road. It has an intersecting hip roof with deep eaves. The front facade has a broad blank garage wall on one end, is balanced by large living room windows on the other. A large central entrance is in between. A walkway runs from the driveway to the front entrance, sited under the protection of the eaves. A large, low concrete planter is located at the end of the walk.
