= Sheldon Heath House =

- U.S. National Register of Historic Places
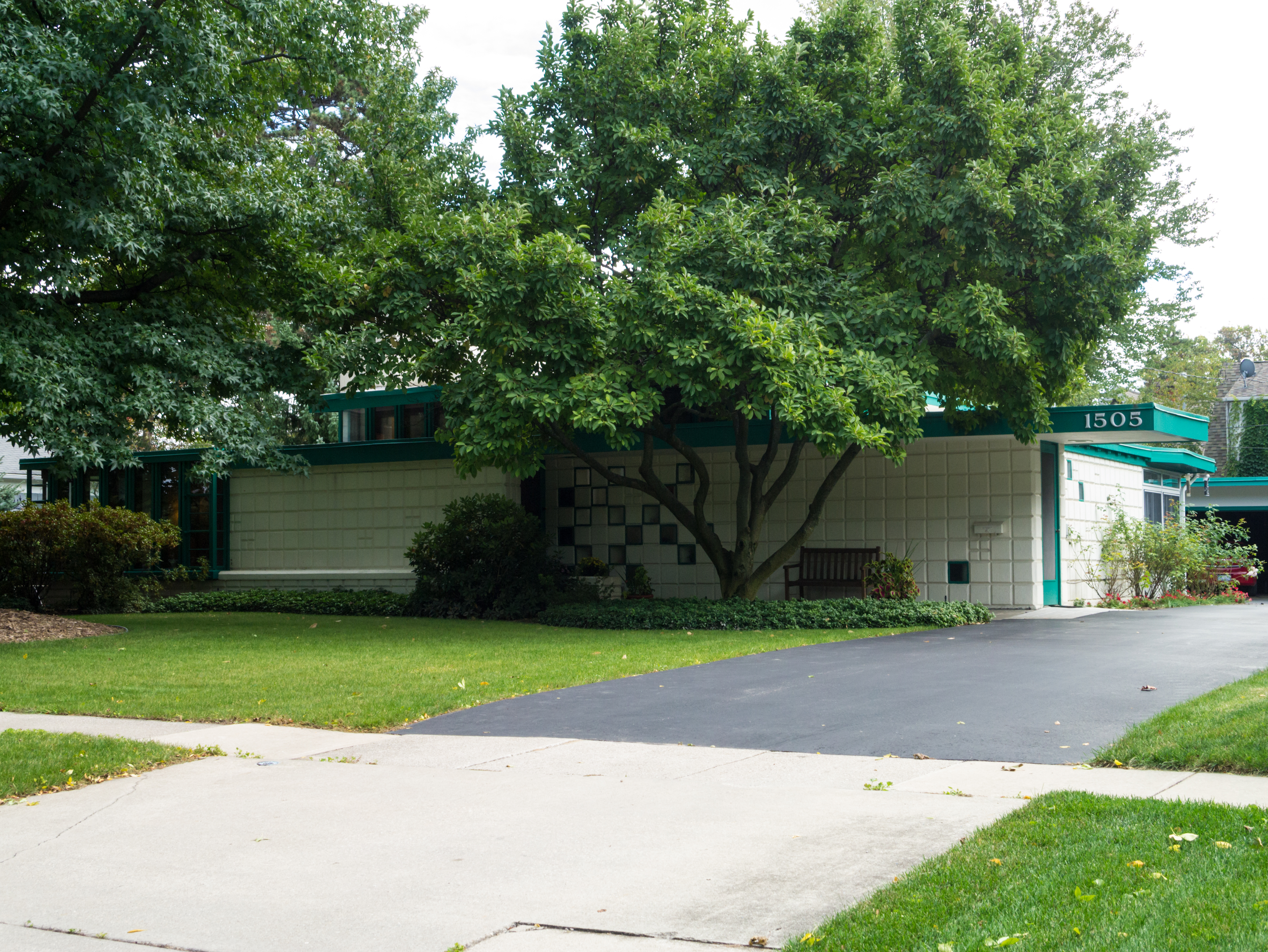
- Interactive map
- Location: 1505 W. St. Andrews, Midland, Michigan
- Coordinates: 43°37′29″N 84°14′40″W
- Area: less than one acre
- Built: 1934
- Architect: Alden B. Dow
- Architectural style: International Style
- MPS: Residential Architecture of Alden B. Dow in Midland 1933--1938 MPS
- NRHP reference No.: 89001438
- Added to NRHP: December 4, 1989

The Sheldon Heath House is a single-family home located at 1505 West St. Andrews Street in Midland, Michigan. It was listed on the National Register of Historic Places in 1989.

== History ==
Sheldon Heath was a chemist at the Dow Chemical Company. He purchased a lot in a newly developed area near the Midland Country Club. In the spring of 1934, Heath hired architect Alden B. Dow to design this house, the first in the development to be constructed. The Bay City Stone Company of Saginaw, Michigan constructed the house, completing it by the end of 1934.

== Description ==
The Sheldon Heath House is a single-story house of unit block construction, measuring 52 feet by 52 feet. The front facade is dominated by a long, narrow horizontal line of wooden fascia running above the blocks. A recessed entry is located in about the midpoint of the facade, with a cantilevered roof reaching out over the driveway at one end of the facade, and a group of tall windows in the other corner. Next to the front door is a unit block wall with clear and colored glass blocks set in checkerboard pattern. Above, clerestory windows are set back from the front wall in the center area of the roof. Two chimneys also pierce the roof.
