= LeRoy Smith House =

- U.S. National Register of Historic Places
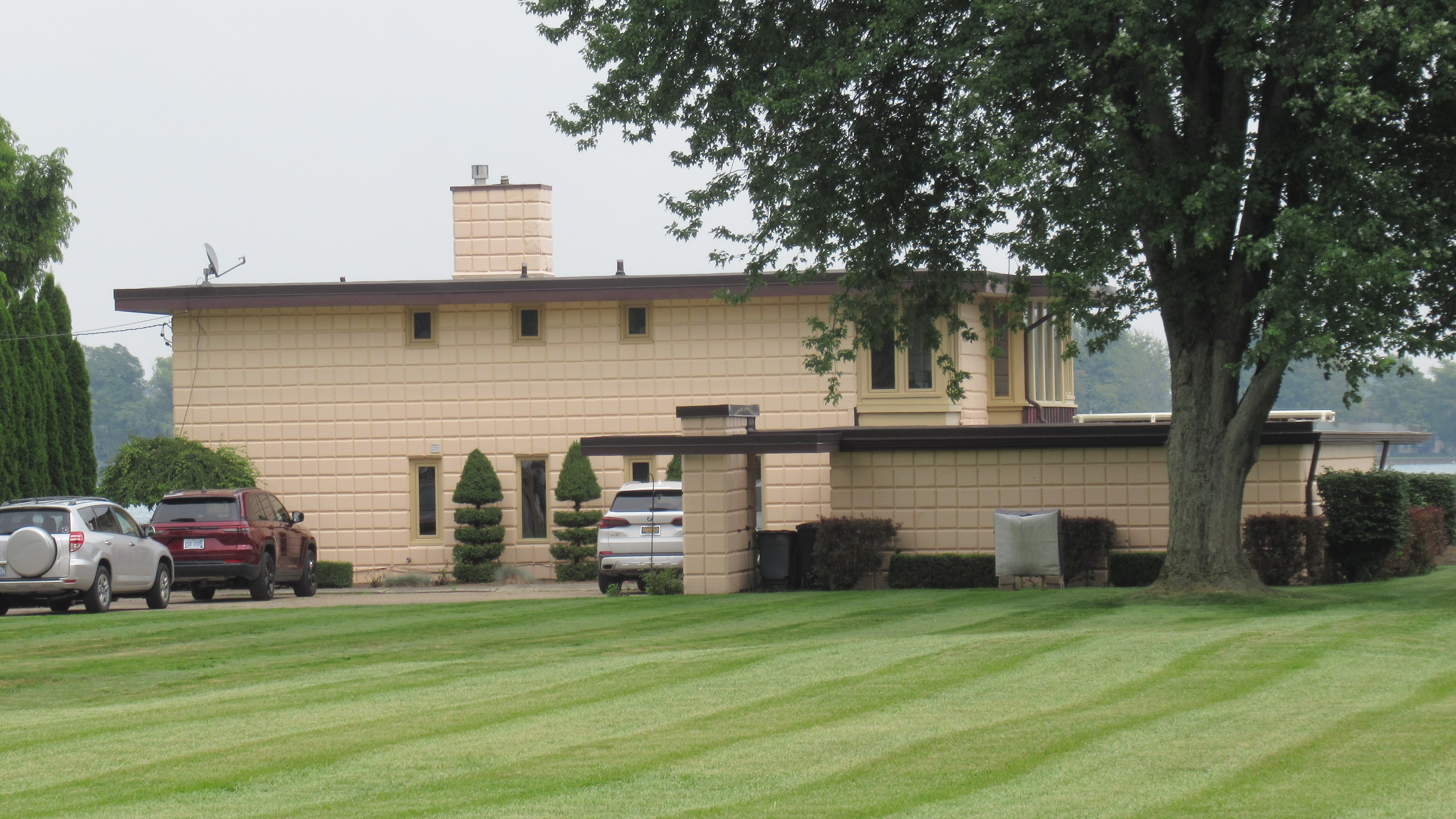

- Location within Michigan Location within the United States
- Interactive map
- Location: 9503 Frank St., Algonac, Michigan
- Coordinates: 42°38′31″N 82°30′50″W
- Area: 1 acre (0.40 ha)
- Built: 1940
- Architect: Alden B. Dow
- Architectural style: Modern Movement
- NRHP reference No.: 96000365
- Added to NRHP: April 4, 1996

The LeRoy Smith House is a private house, designed by Alden B. Dow, and located at 9503 Frank Street in Algonac, Michigan. It was listed on the National Register of Historic Places in 1996.

== History ==
LeRoy Smith was a salesman for the Hobart Company, which manufactured paint sprayers, battery chargers, and welding equipment. After working for Hobart for a time, Smith founded his own company to distribute Hobart equipment. Smith and his family lived in Highland Park, Michigan, but owned this plot of land along the St. Clair River near Algonac for summer trips. In the late 1930s, the Smiths decided to build a summer house on the property to take advantage of the river view. Their daughter Maxine's parents-in-law had commissioned a house from Alden B. Dow in 1938, and although they had ultimately decided not to build, they highly recommended Dow to the Smiths. The Smiths contacted Dow in 1940, and construction began on this house in December of that year. However, the contractor had difficulties, and the house was not finished until early 1942.

== Description ==
The LeRoy Smith House is a two-story, flat-roofed house constructed of 12 in × 12 in (300 mm × 300 mm) cinder "unit blocks" designed and patented by Dow. A long, low three-car garage extends at a right angle from the corner of the house. The street side of the house has a plain, flat facade with a few small windows; the river side, in contrast, contains a large expanse of windows opening onto the water, underneath wide, projecting eaves.

On the interior, the first floor has low ceilings and expansive windows overlooking the river. The first floor contains a playroom, dining room, kitchen, and a bedroom and bathroom. An open central stairway leads up to the living room, which has a higher ceiling than on the first floor. This floor also contains two bedrooms and another bathroom. Built-in shelving and storage units are located throughout the house.
