= Earl Stein House =

- U.S. National Register of Historic Places
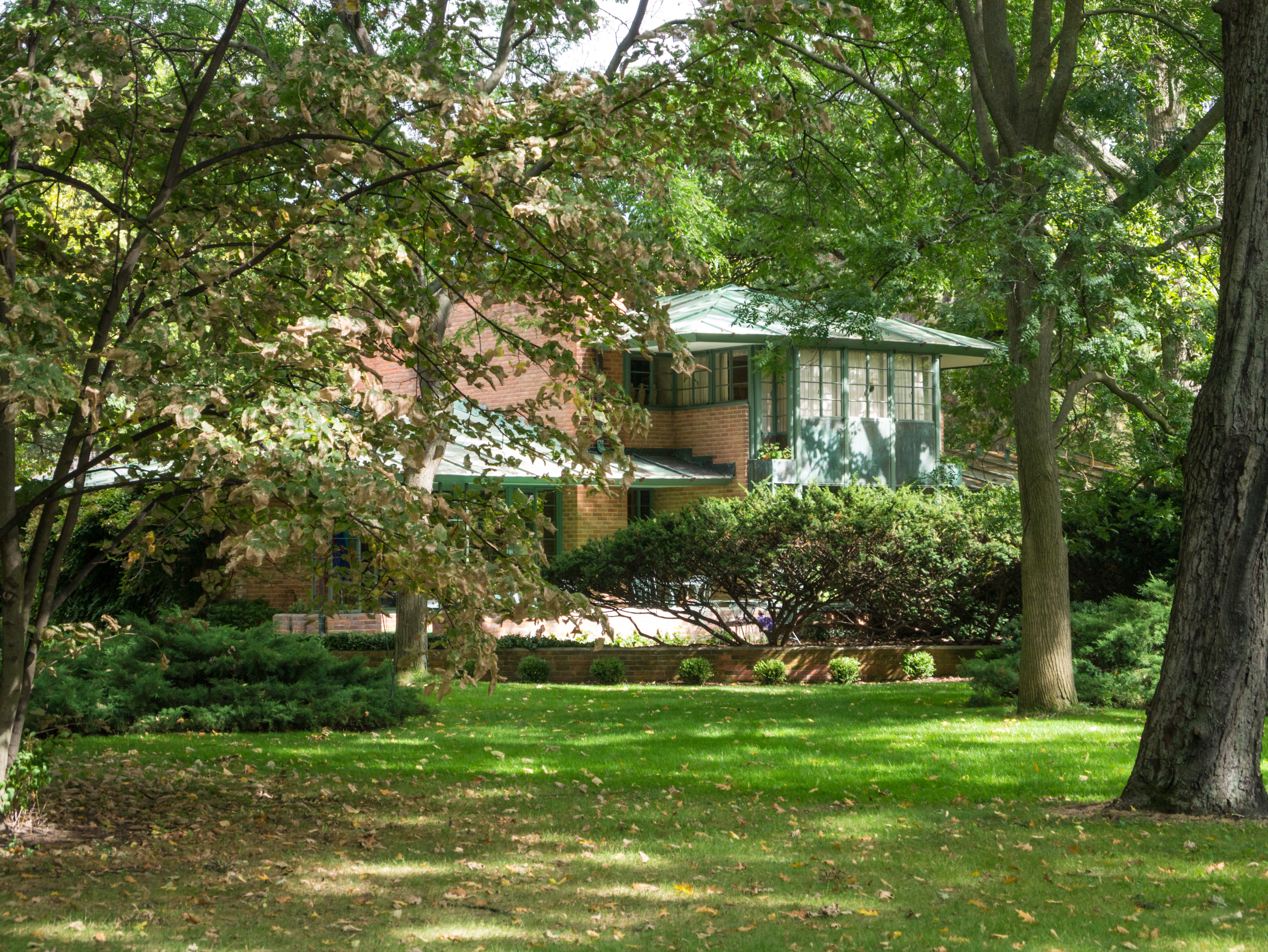
- Interactive map
- Location: 209 Revere, Midland, Michigan
- Coordinates: 43°37′04″N 84°15′05″W
- Area: less than one acre
- Built: 1933
- Architect: Alden B. Dow
- Architectural style: Prairie School
- MPS: Residential Architecture of Alden B. Dow in Midland 1933--1938 MPS
- NRHP reference No.: 89001437
- Added to NRHP: December 4, 1989

The Earl Stein House is a single-family home located at 209 Revere Street in Midland, Michigan. It was listed on the National Register of Historic Places in 1989. The house is significant as the first house designed through the Taliesin Fellowship program, established by Frank Lloyd Wright in 1933.

== History ==
In early 1933, Earl Stein hired architect Alden B. Dow to design this house. Dow created some preliminary sketches, and brought them with him to start a fellowship at Taliesin with Frank Lloyd Wright. Under Wright's tutelage, Dow reworked the design multiple times. Dow completed the design later in 1933, and construction began in October. The house was completed in 1934. In the 1970s, bedrooms were added to the house in accordance with a plan by Dow.

== Description ==
The Earl Stein House is a low brick Prairie School house with an L-shaped floor plan. The house has a low-pitched copper clad hip roof, accentuated with a massive chimney. A long narrow loggia leading to the main entryway between the wings. The house has an upper level, and a basement that opens into the rear yard.
