= Calvin A. and Alta Koch Campbell House =

- U.S. National Register of Historic Places
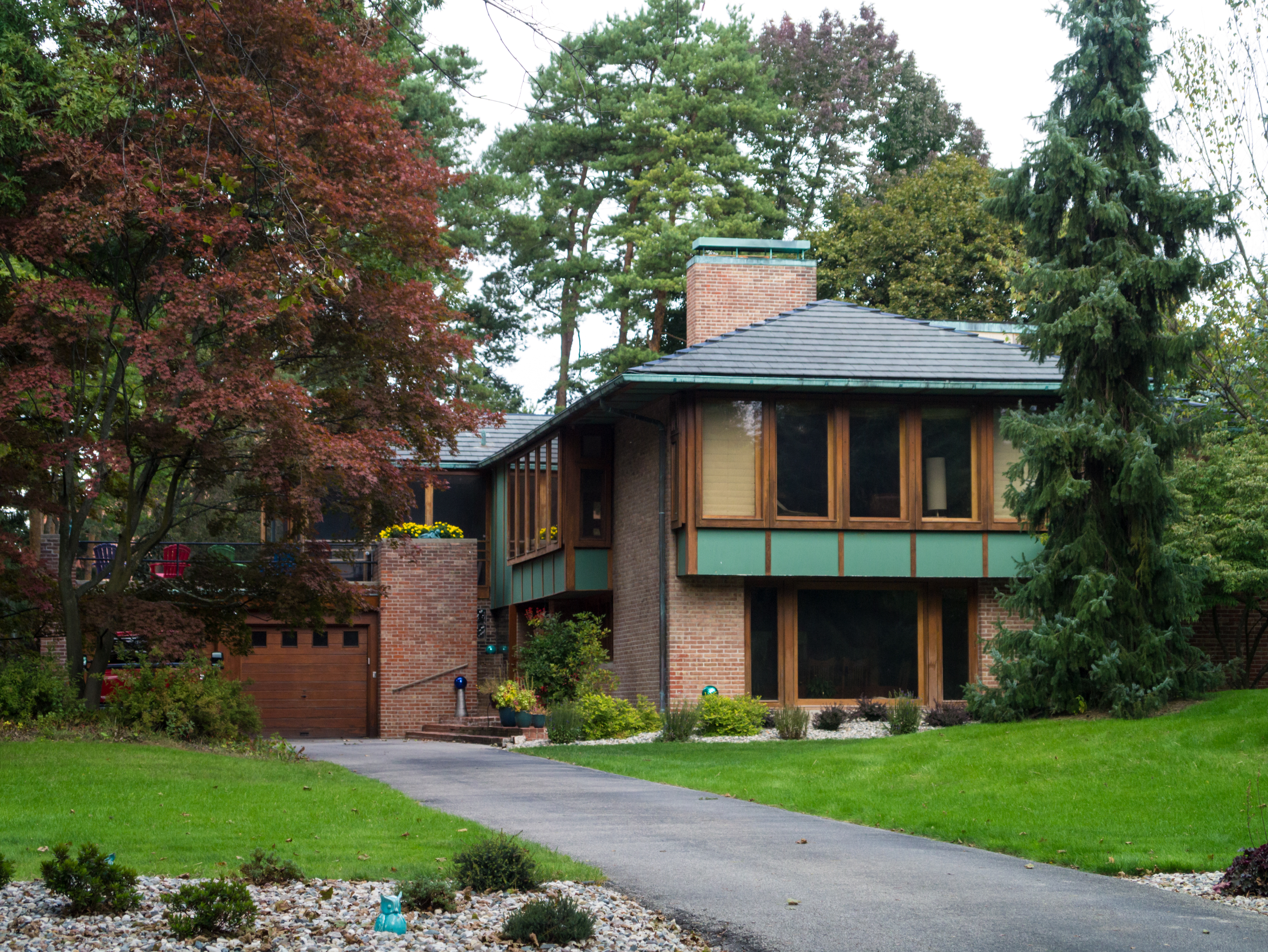
- Interactive map
- Location: 1210 W. Park Dr., Midland, Michigan
- Coordinates: 43°37′21″N 84°14′58″W
- Area: less than one acre
- Built: 1939
- Built by: Fred C. Trier Construction Company
- Architect: Alden B. Dow
- Architectural style: Modern Movement
- MPS: Residential Architecture of Alden B. Dow in Midland, Michigan MPS AD
- NRHP reference No.: 04000642
- Added to NRHP: June 22, 2004

The Calvin A. and Alta Koch Campbell House is a single-family home located at 1210 West Park Drive in Midland, Michigan. It was listed on the National Register of Historic Places in 2004.

== History ==
Calvin A Campbell was one of Alden B. Dow's fraternity brothers at the University of Michigan in the 1920s. He joined Dow Chemical Company, and in the 1940s became vice president and general counsel of the corporation. In 1949, he was named Secretary of the Board of Directors.

In 1939, Campbell hired Alden Dow to design this house for him. Construction by the Fred C. Trier Construction Company began late that year, and the house was completed in 1940. An addition was made to the house in 1997. The Campbell family owned the house into the 21st century.

== Description ==
The Calvin A. and Alta Koch Campbell House is a two and one-half story modified T -plan house clad with brick and panel. It is topped with a hipped roof. The house is sited on a hilly lot, so that the upper story opens directly onto ground level on one side of the house. On two sides, the second floor overhangs the first, with long bands of windows running across the second floor facades. An attached garage is located on one side.

On the interior, the first floor contains a game room, dining room, kitchen, and utility room. The second floor contains a living room, library, and three bedrooms. A fourth bedroom is located on the third level under the dormer.
