= Charles MacCallum House =

- U.S. National Register of Historic Places
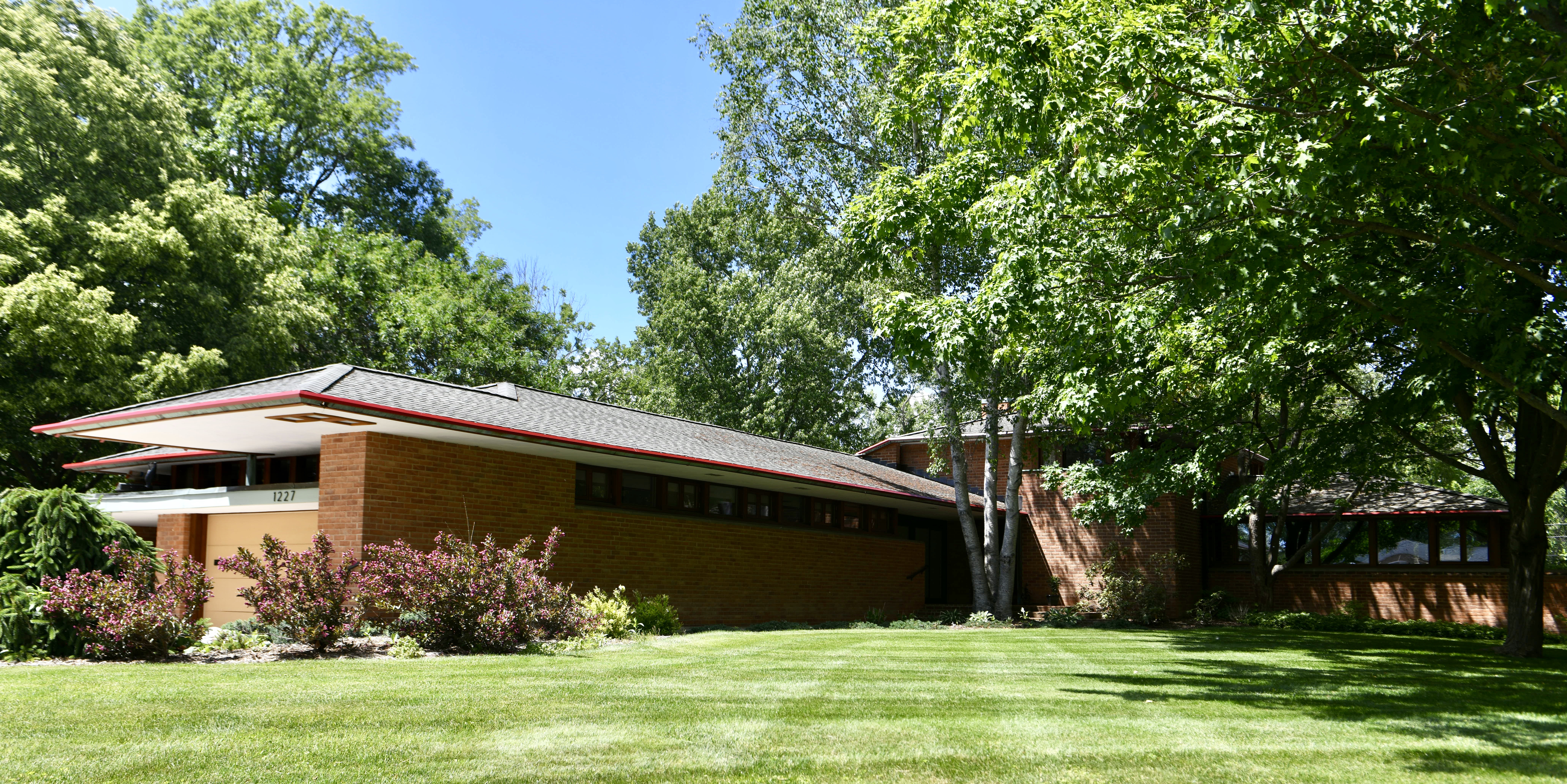
- Interactive map
- Location: 1227 W. Sugnet, Midland, Michigan
- Coordinates: 43°38′01″N 84°14′28″W
- Area: less than one acre
- Built: 1935
- Architect: Alden B. Dow
- Architectural style: Prairie School
- MPS: Residential Architecture of Alden B. Dow in Midland 1933--1938 MPS
- NRHP reference No.: 89001442
- Added to NRHP: December 4, 1989

The Charles MacCallum House is a single-family home located at 1227 West Sugnet Street in Midland, Michigan. It was listed on the National Register of Historic Places in 1989.

== History ==
Dr. Charles MacCallum was a Midland physician, In early 1935, he asked Alden Dow to design a house to place on a lot near Midland Country Club's golf course. After several design iterations, Dow produced plans for this house. Erection began in December 1935, by the Bay City Stone Company; the house was completed in 1936.

== Description ==
The Charles MacCallum house is a brick structure set out in an asymmetrical L shape, with a smaller, taller section pointing toward the road and a longer leg running parallel. A long entryway is sheltered underneath a broad overhanging roof.
