= Parents' and Children's Schoolhouse =

- U.S. National Register of Historic Places
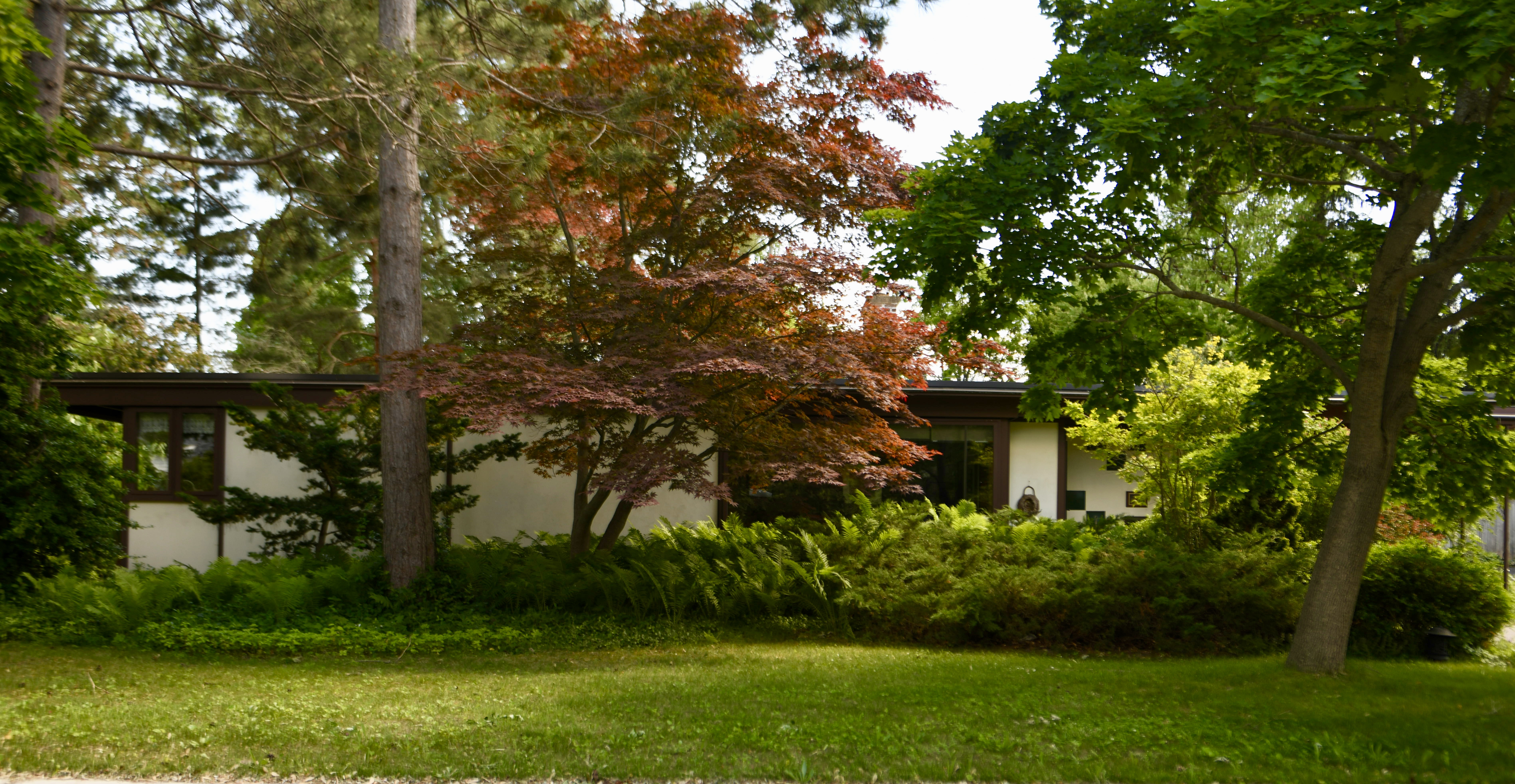
- Interactive map
- Location: 1505 Crane Ct., Midland, Michigan
- Coordinates: 43°37′26″N 84°14′42″W
- Area: less than one acre
- Built: 1938
- Architect: Alden B. Dow
- Architectural style: International Style
- MPS: Residential Architecture of Alden B. Dow in Midland 1933--1938 MPS
- NRHP reference No.: 96000800
- Added to NRHP: July 25, 1996

The Parents' and Children's Schoolhouse, located at 1505 Crane Court in Midland, Michigan, was constructed for use as a nursery school. It has since been adapted as a single-family home. It was listed on the National Register of Historic Places in 1996.

== History ==
Architect Alden B. Dow's wife, Vada B. Dow, was trained as a teacher at both Kalamazoo College and Columbia University. In the late 1930s, she established a progressive nursery school, using her own basement to house the program. The school quickly grew, and Dow began looking for a new building, However, the shortage of housing in Midland at the time made locating a new building difficult. She turned to her husband to design a new facility, and in 1938 the Parents' and Children's Schoolhouse was constructed. The design was recognized in a 1941 issue of Architectural Forum for its low cost and technical excellence. The school was quite successful, and in 1942 plans for additional classroom space were drawn up. However, these plans were never carried out, and Dow closed the nursery school soon thereafter. In the mid-1940s, Alden Dow directed some minor interior renovations to convert the building into a three-bedroom home. Vada Dow continued to own the house as a rental property until the late 1960s, when it was purchased by a tenant.

== Description ==
The Parents' and Children's Schoolhouse is an L-shaped, single story, International Style structure with a flat roof and stuccoed exterior. The design is marked by strong horizontal lines and broad flat surfaces. The front facade is divided into three sections, with a large picture window in the center flanked by a blank wall on one side and the front entrance and garage on the other. The entrance and garage are slightly recessed, allowing the roof to provide shelter. The roof continues on to overhang at each end on the building, emphasizing the strong horizontal lines of the house.
