= Alden Hanson House =

- U.S. National Register of Historic Places
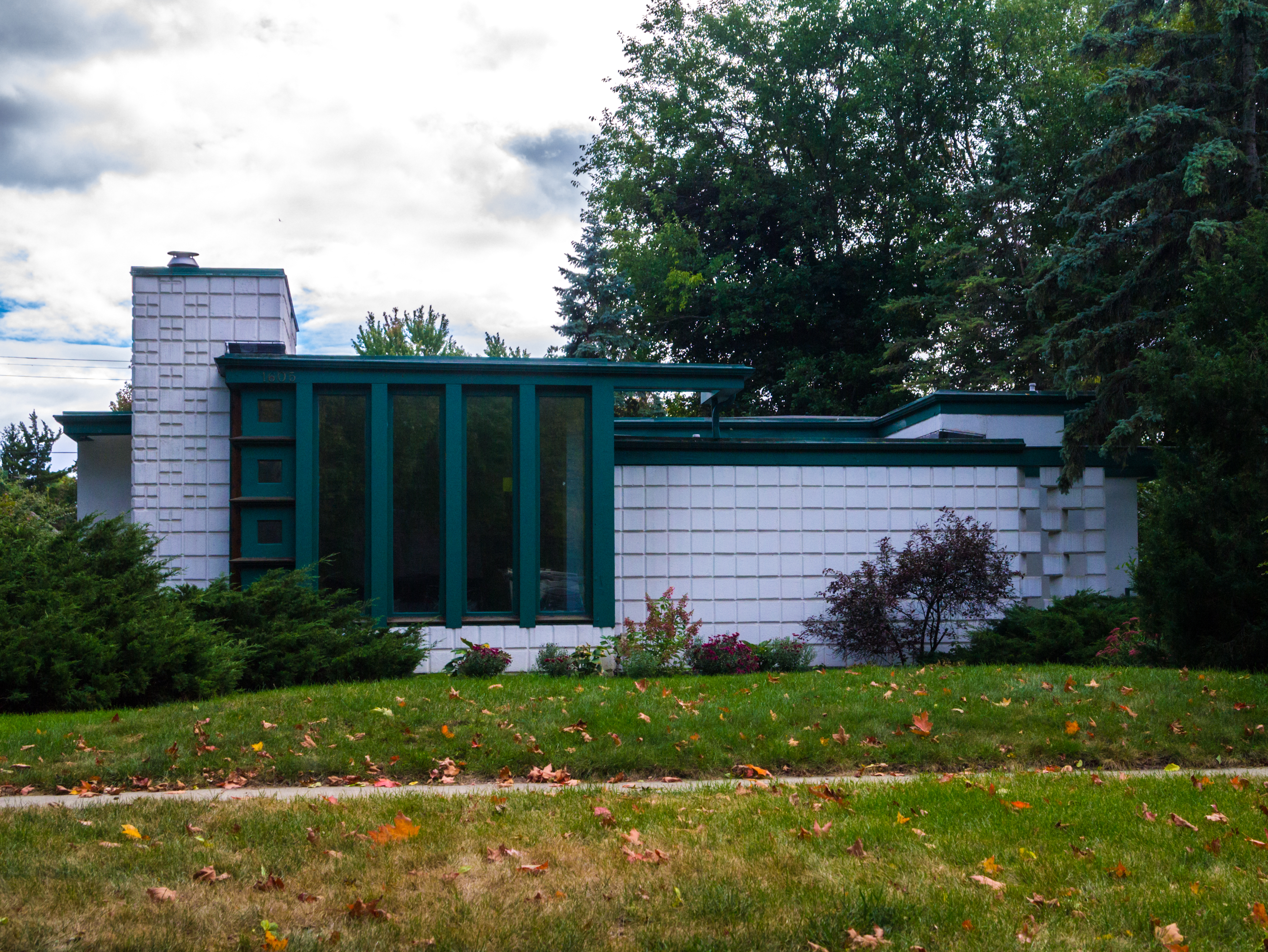
- Interactive map
- Location: 1605 W. St. Andrews, Midland, Michigan
- Coordinates: 43°37′29″N 84°14′45″W
- Area: less than one acre
- Built: 1934
- Architect: Alden B. Dow
- Architectural style: International Style
- MPS: Residential Architecture of Alden B. Dow in Midland 1933--1938 MPS
- NRHP reference No.: 89001443
- Added to NRHP: December 4, 1989

The Alden Hanson House is a single-family home located at 1605 West St. Andrews Street in Midland, Michigan. It was listed on the National Register of Historic Places in 1989.

== History ==
Alden Hanson, was a physicist with the Dow Chemical Company. In 1934, he hired his brother-in-law Alden B. Dow to design this house. Later that year, Hansen hired Trier Construction Company to build the house. Work began in September, and was substantially complete early in 1935.

== Description ==
The Alden Hanson House is a single-story International Style unit block house, with a long solid wall facing the street. Tall narrow living room windows project sightly from the wall at one end of the facade, giving a vertical component to the elevation. A massive chimney is sited at the corner. Behind the chimney is the entry to the house, set down several steps. Unit block planters nearby extend into the yard, and the garage sits at the rear of the house.
