= Charles and Mary Kempf Penhaligen House =

Historic house in Midland, Michigan, US

- U.S. National Register of Historic Places
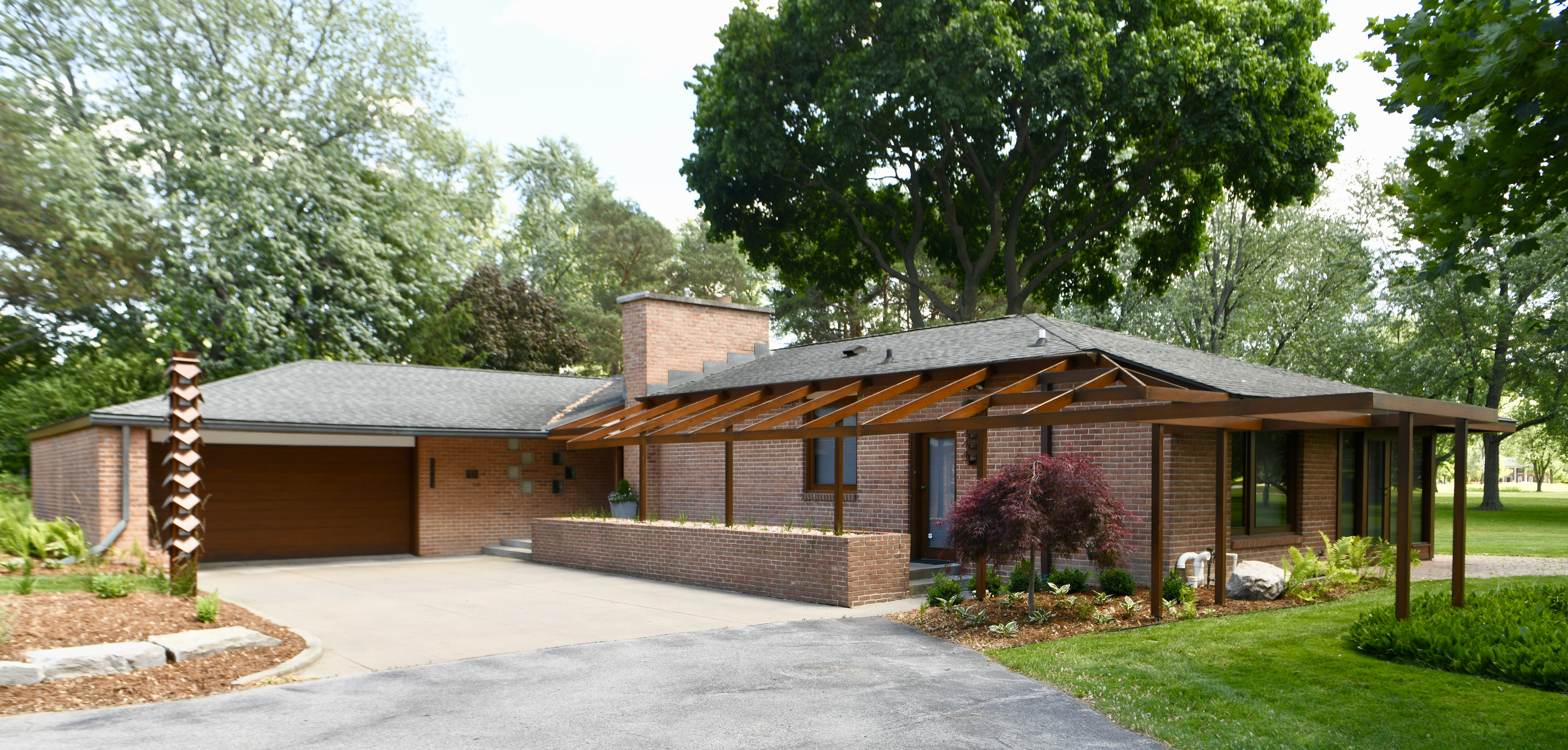
- Interactive map
- Location: 1203 W. Sugnet Rd., Midland, Michigan
- Coordinates: 43°37′59″N 84°14′27″W
- Area: less than one acre
- Built: 1941
- Built by: Alden Dow Building Co.
- Architect: Alden B. Dow
- Architectural style: Modern Movement
- MPS: Residential Architecture of Alden B. Dow in Midland, Michigan MPS AD
- NRHP reference No.: 04000640
- Added to NRHP: June 22, 2004

The Charles and Mary Kempf Penhaligen House is a single-family home located at 1203 W. Sugnet Road in Midland, Michigan. It was listed on the National Register of Historic Places in 2004.

== History ==
Charles Penhaligen was born in 1901. He became involved with the Dow Chemical Company in 1936 as an accountant with Dowell Incorporated, a new Dow subsidiary. In 1940, he was elected treasurer and director of Dowell, and in 1941, he was appointed auditor of the Dow Chemical Company. That same year, he hired Alden B. Dow to design and construct anew residence for himself, his wife and his two children. During Penhaligen 's career he also helped organize the Dow Chemical Employees' Credit Union, and served as auditor of Dow Magnesium Corporation and Dow Chemical of Canada. The Charles Penhaligen House was among the first houses designed by Dow and constructed by the Alden Dow Building Company, and was completed in late 1941.

Charles Penhaligen died in 1959, and his widow sold the house to o Mr. Richard Payne in 1990. Payne refurbished the house, expanding the master bathroom and bedroom and reallocating the interior space. He sold the house in 2000.

== Description ==
The Charles Penhaligen House is a single-story, hip-roofed, L-plan brick house with wood trim. It is set well back from the road on a cul d'sac in a residential neighborhood. It has a drive paralleling the long axis of the house and ending at a two-car garage, nestled into a gentle hill. A large chimney protrudes from the roof at the junction of the garage with the main house. The front facade is relatively blank, broken only by a window and kitchen door. The facade is separated from the drive by a brick planter, and a trellis-like extension of the roofline shelters the raised terrace behind the planter. The rear of the house looks out over the golf course, and contains wrap-around windows.
