= Mr. and Mrs. Robert C. Reinke House =

- U.S. National Register of Historic Places
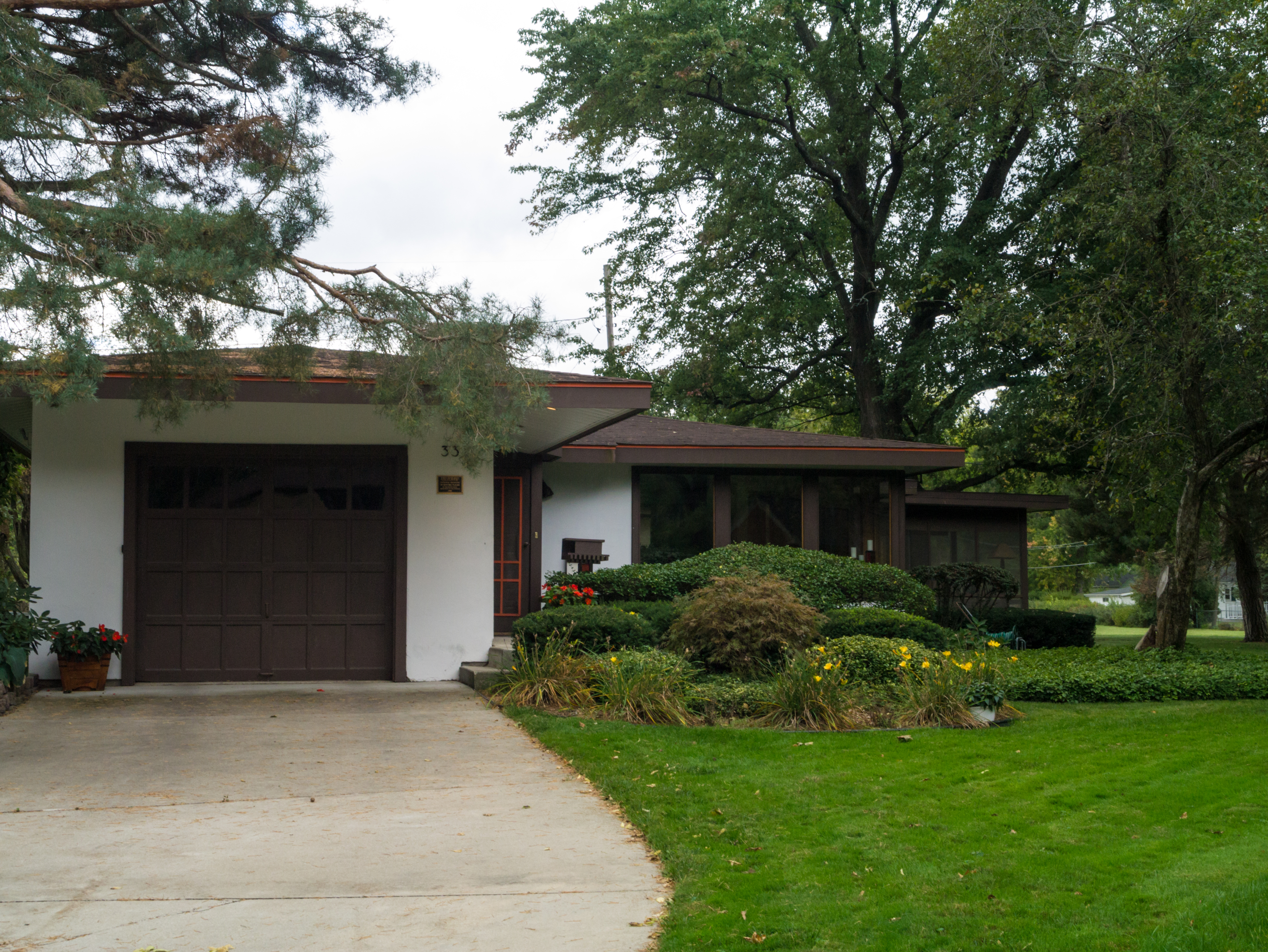
- Interactive map
- Location: 33 Lexington Court, Midland, Michigan
- Coordinates: 43°38′12″N 84°13′18″W
- Area: less than one acre
- Built: 1941
- Built by: Alden Dow Building Co.
- Architect: Alden B. Dow
- Architectural style: Modern Movement
- MPS: Residential Architecture of Alden B. Dow in Midland, Michigan MPS AD
- NRHP reference No.: 04000639
- Added to NRHP: June 22, 2004

The Mr. and Mrs. Robert C. Reinke House is a single-family home located at 33 Lexington Court in Midland, Michigan. It was listed on the National Register of Historic Places in 2004.

== History ==
The Robert Reinke House was designed by architect Alden B. Dow in 1941. Very little is known about the Reinkes or their association with Dow. In 1947, Dow drew up plans for additions to the house, including a garage and a master bedroom. In 1961, the house was purchased by Jack and Doris Feagley. Jack was an architectural associate of Alden Dow's for twenty-five years. In 1964, Jack Feagley drew up plans for another addition to the house, creating a family room by enclosing the back porch and extending the dining room. The Feagleys lived in the house into the 21st century.

== Description ==
The Robert Reinke House is a single-story house with stucco walls and a low-pitched hip roof with broad, overhanging eaves. The house features a large expanses of windows and a central chimney projecting from the roof. The original house was almost square in plan, but the series of later additions, including an attached garage, family room, screen porch and deck, have made the footprint more irregular. The house is located in a shady lot in a residential cul de sac.
