= George Greene House =

- U.S. National Register of Historic Places
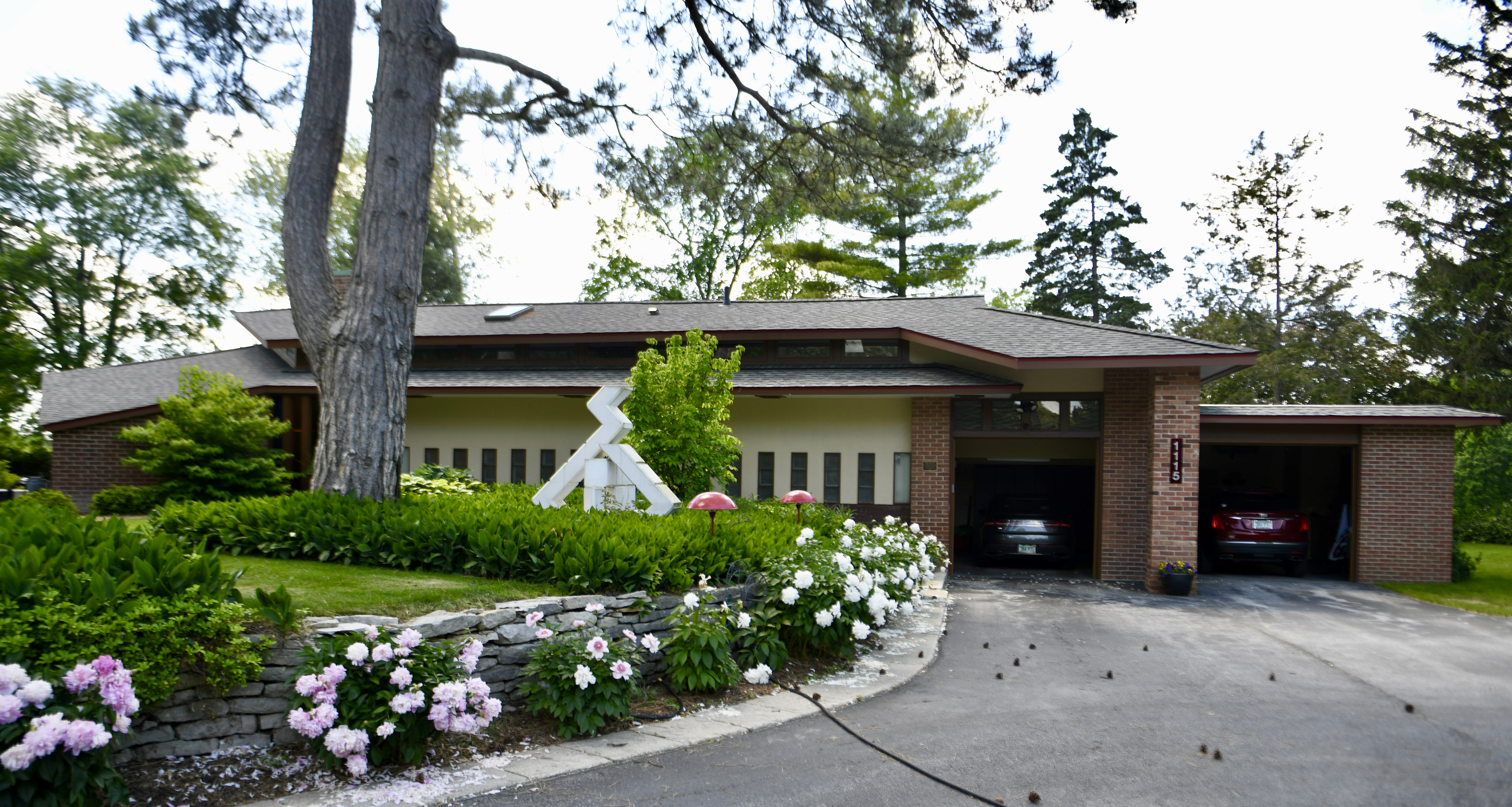
- Interactive map
- Location: 1115 W. Sugnet, Midland, Michigan
- Coordinates: 43°37′59″N 84°14′30″W
- Area: less than one acre
- Built: 1936
- Architect: Alden B. Dow
- Architectural style: Prairie School
- MPS: Residential Architecture of Alden B. Dow in Midland 1933--1938 MPS
- NRHP reference No.: 89001441
- Added to NRHP: December 4, 1989

The George Greene House is a single-family home located at 1115 West Sugnet Street in Midland, Michigan. It was listed on the National Register of Historic Places in 1989.

== History ==
George Greene was a plant engineer at the Dow Chemical Company. In the spring of 1936, he hired Alden B. Dow to design this house. The house was the second of three Dow designed at the edge of the golf course. Construction began in June by the Alden Dow Building Company at a cost of $15,481. The house was completed in 1937. The garage was enlarged in the 1970s.

== Description ==
The George Greene House is a single-story brick house of 1600 square feet. It is built of two sections: a long rectangular one and a shorter square section, placed at a 45-degree angle to the main section. The entrance to the house is at the junction of the sections, accessed by a short staircase at the opposite end of the building. A long walkway sheltered by a roof overhang connects the stair to the entrance.
