= Donald L. Conner House =

- U.S. National Register of Historic Places
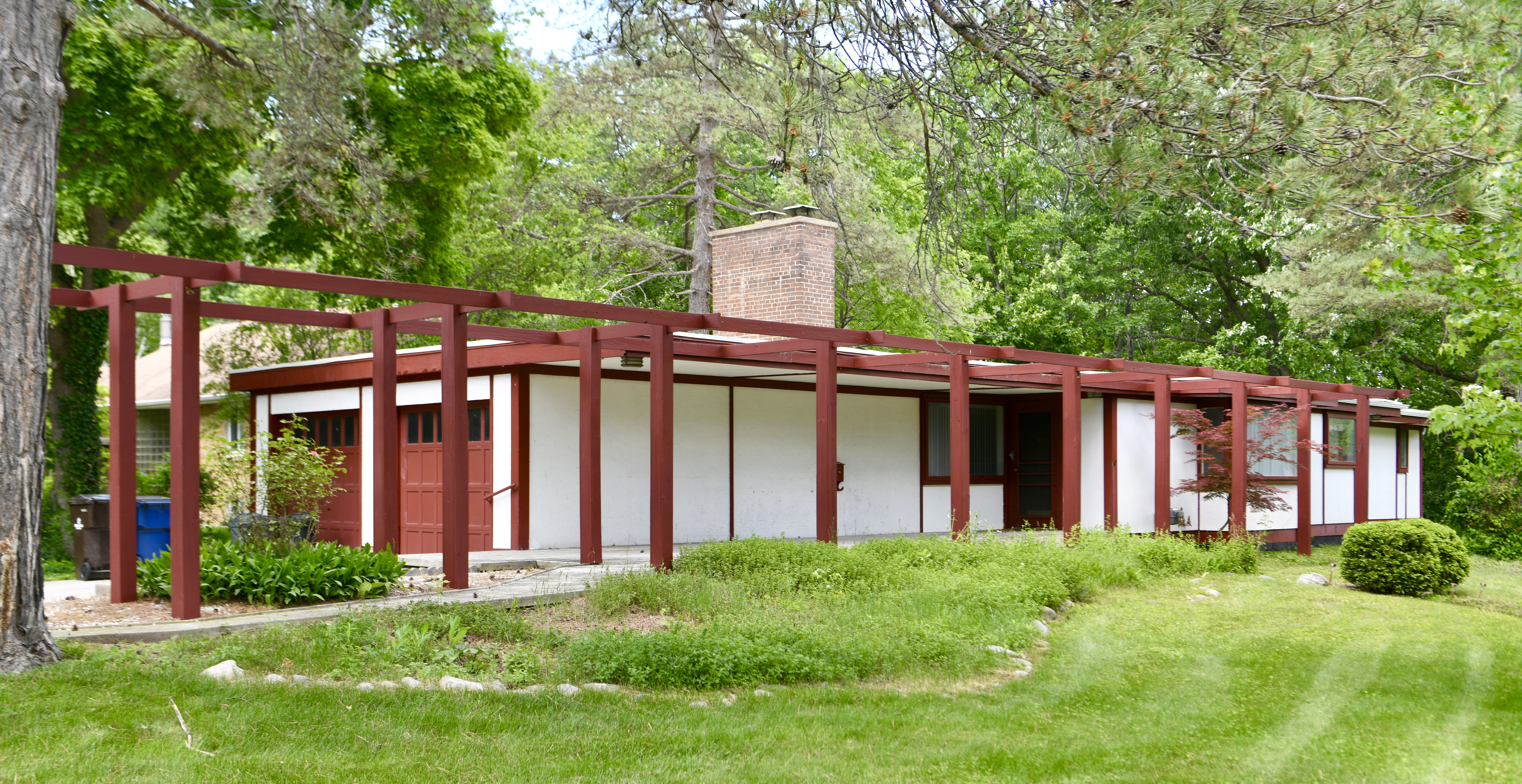
- Interactive map
- Location: 402 Lingle Ln., Midland, Michigan
- Coordinates: 43°37′35″N 84°13′57″W
- Area: less than one acre
- Built: 1936
- Architect: Alden B. Dow
- Architectural style: International Style
- MPS: Residential Architecture of Alden B. Dow in Midland 1933--1938 MPS
- NRHP reference No.: 89001439
- Added to NRHP: December 4, 1989

The Donald L. Conner House is a single-family home located at 2705 Manor Street in Midland, Michigan. It was listed on the National Register of Historic Places in 1989.

== History ==
This house was designed by architect Alden B. Dow for Donald L. Conner in 1936.

== Description ==
The Donald L. Connor House is a small single-story flat-roofed International Style residence located on a long, narrow, sloping corner lot. The front elevation contains a two car garage, framed by the broad fascia. The most noticeable feature of the house is the long trellis walkway, which runs along the side of the house and extends forward well beyond the front plane of the garage.
