= Oscar C. Diehl House =

- U.S. National Register of Historic Places
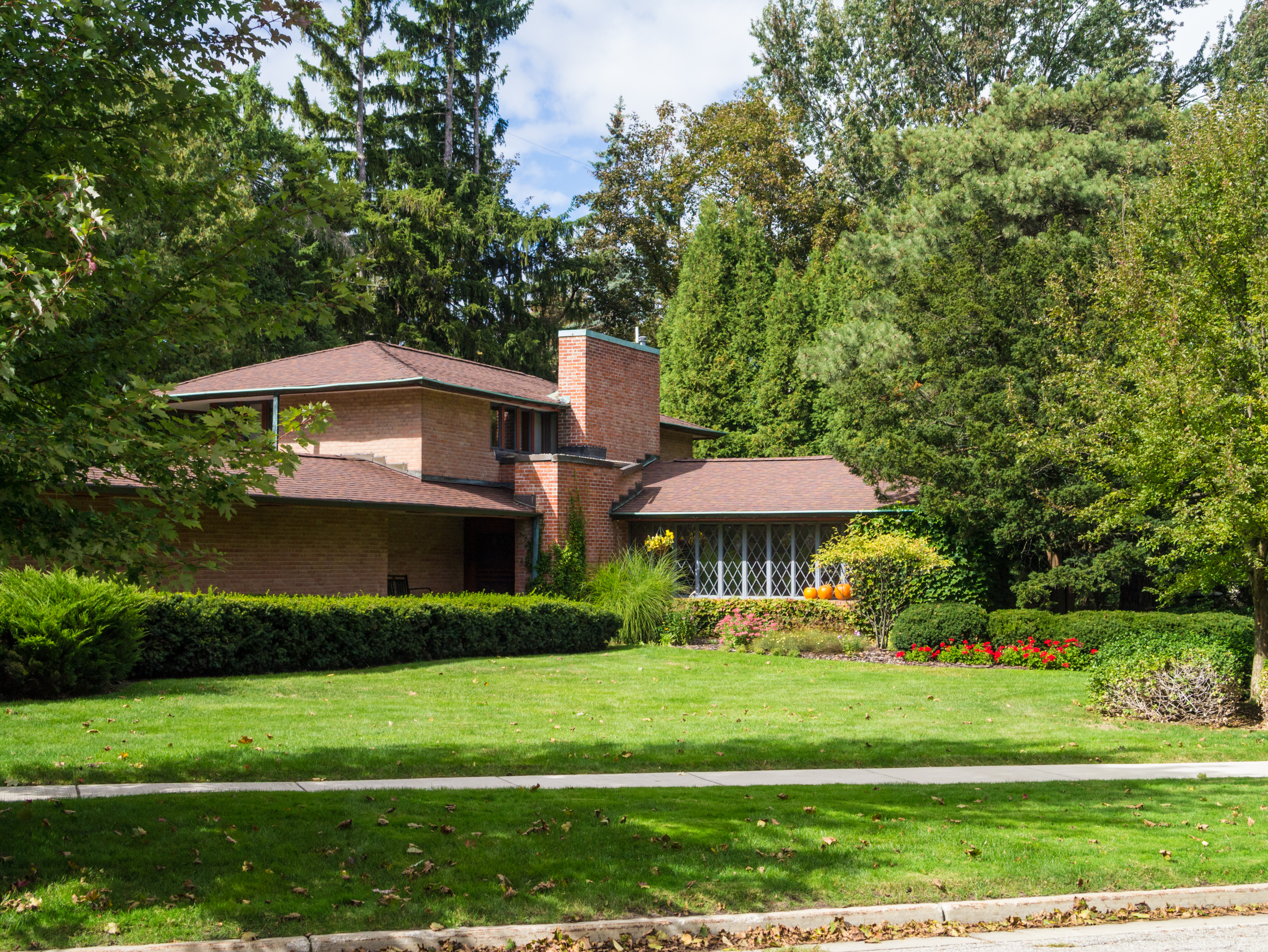
- Interactive map
- Location: 919 E. Park, Midland, Michigan
- Coordinates: 43°37′12″N 84°14′59″W
- Area: less than one acre
- Built: 1935
- Architect: Alden B. Dow
- Architectural style: Prairie School
- MPS: Residential Architecture of Alden B. Dow in Midland 1933--1938 MPS
- NRHP reference No.: 89001436
- Added to NRHP: December 4, 1989

The Oscar C. Diehl House is a single-family home located at 919 East Park Drive in Midland, Michigan. It was listed on the National Register of Historic Places in 1989.

== History ==
Oscar C. Diehl was a salesman for the Dow Chemical Company. He and his wife hired architect Alden B. Dow to design this building in 1935. The house was constructed by Bay City Stone Company at a cost of $13,020, and was substantially completed the same year. In the late 1970s, the rear half of the original garage was converted into a spare bedroom.

== Description ==
The Oscar C. Diehl House is a long, L-shaped brick house with low-pitched hip roofs, with features reminiscent of the Prairie style. It is sited on a small corner lot. One leg of the building contains the main living area and has two levels. The other leg, which is long and narrow, contains the garage. The wings are joined with a large chimney, near which is the main entrance to the house. The wall of the garage wing is unbroken brick, while the living quarters are fronted with large windows with a diamond pattern leaded glass.
