= John S. Whitman House =

- U.S. National Register of Historic Places
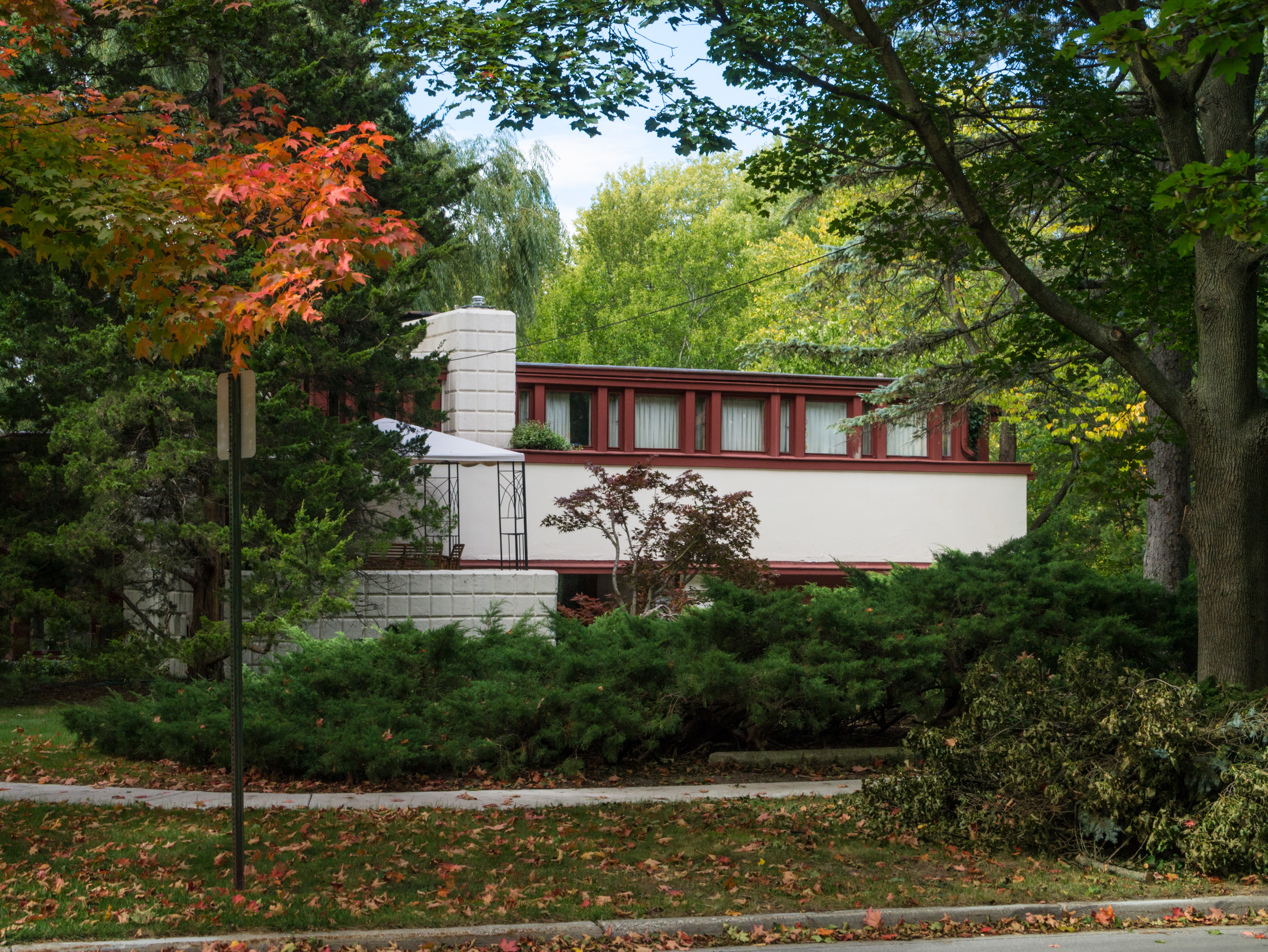
- Interactive map
- Location: 2407 Manor, Midland, Michigan
- Coordinates: 43°37′28″N 84°14′07″W
- Area: less than one acre
- Built: 1934
- Architect: Alden B. Dow
- Architectural style: International Style
- MPS: Residential Architecture of Alden B. Dow in Midland 1933--1938 MPS
- NRHP reference No.: 89001440
- Added to NRHP: December 4, 1989

The John S. Whitman House is a single-family home located at 2407 Manor Street in Midland, Michigan. It was listed on the National Register of Historic Places in 1989.

== History ==
John Whitman was a former mayor of Midland (serving from 1921 to 1930). Whitman was also involved in several local businesses, including one which manufactured unit blocks for architect Alden B. Dow. Late in 1934, Whitman hired Dow to design a unit block house to sit on this corner lot. Dow completed the house design by the end of 1934. The house was constructed in 1935. The design later won the grand prize for residential architecture at the 1937 Exposition Internationale des Arts et Techniques dans la Vie Moderne in Paris, an event which brought recognition to the young Dow.

== Description ==
The John S. Whitman House is constructed as three long and narrow rectangular blocks, stacked atop of the other. The overall look is strongly horizontal, balanced with vertical lines from the embossed chimney, a patio window and bay windows on one side. The entrance is within a small, recessed door near the garage.
