= Donald and Louise Clark Irish House =

- U.S. National Register of Historic Places
- Interactive map
- Location: 1801 W. Sugnet Rd., Midland, Michigan
- Coordinates: 43°38′00″N 84°15′01″W
- Area: less than one acre
- Built: 1941
- Built by: Alden Dow Building Co.
- Architect: Alden B. Dow
- Architectural style: Modern Movement
- MPS: Residential Architecture of Alden B. Dow in Midland, Michigan MPS AD
- NRHP reference No.: 04000641
- Added to NRHP: June 22, 2004

The Donald and Louise Clark Irish House is a single-family home located at 1801 West Sugnet Road in Midland, Michigan. It was listed on the National Register of Historic Places in 2004.

== History ==
Dr. Donald Delance Irish was born in 1905. Irish came to work at Dow Chemical Company in 1934, and became an internationally recognized biochemist, specializing in industrial hygiene and toxicology. By the mid-1940s, he had founded and was directing Dow Chemical's Biochemistry Laboratory, leading what is now the Health and Environmental Science Department at Dow Chemical.

In 1937, Irish and three partners purchased property at the southwest corner of Sugnet and Eastman Roads, planning on developing the property into a subdivision. By 1941, one of the partners had been bought out and lots were beginning to sell. In 1941 Irish hired architect Alden B. Dow to design this house, and signed a contract with the Alden B. Dow Building Company to construct it. Donald Clark died in 1987, and the estate of Louise Clark Irish sold the house in 1992.

== Description ==
The Donald and Louise Clark Irish House is a two-story house built with a mix of brick, stucco, wood and glass, with an exterior consisting of an interesting mix of planes and angles. The house is set well back from the street at the end of a cul de sac. The driveway runs to the house, and is separated from a terrace near the house by a low brick wall. The gabled roof has an asymmetrical pitch; at one end of the house, another smaller gabled roof sits atop the main roof, projecting outward and giving the roof a terraced look. A recessed entrance is at the middle of the front facade, sheltered by the overhanging roof. The entryway is flanked by the garage and a projecting glass bay.
