= Joseph A. Cavanagh House =

- U.S. National Register of Historic Places
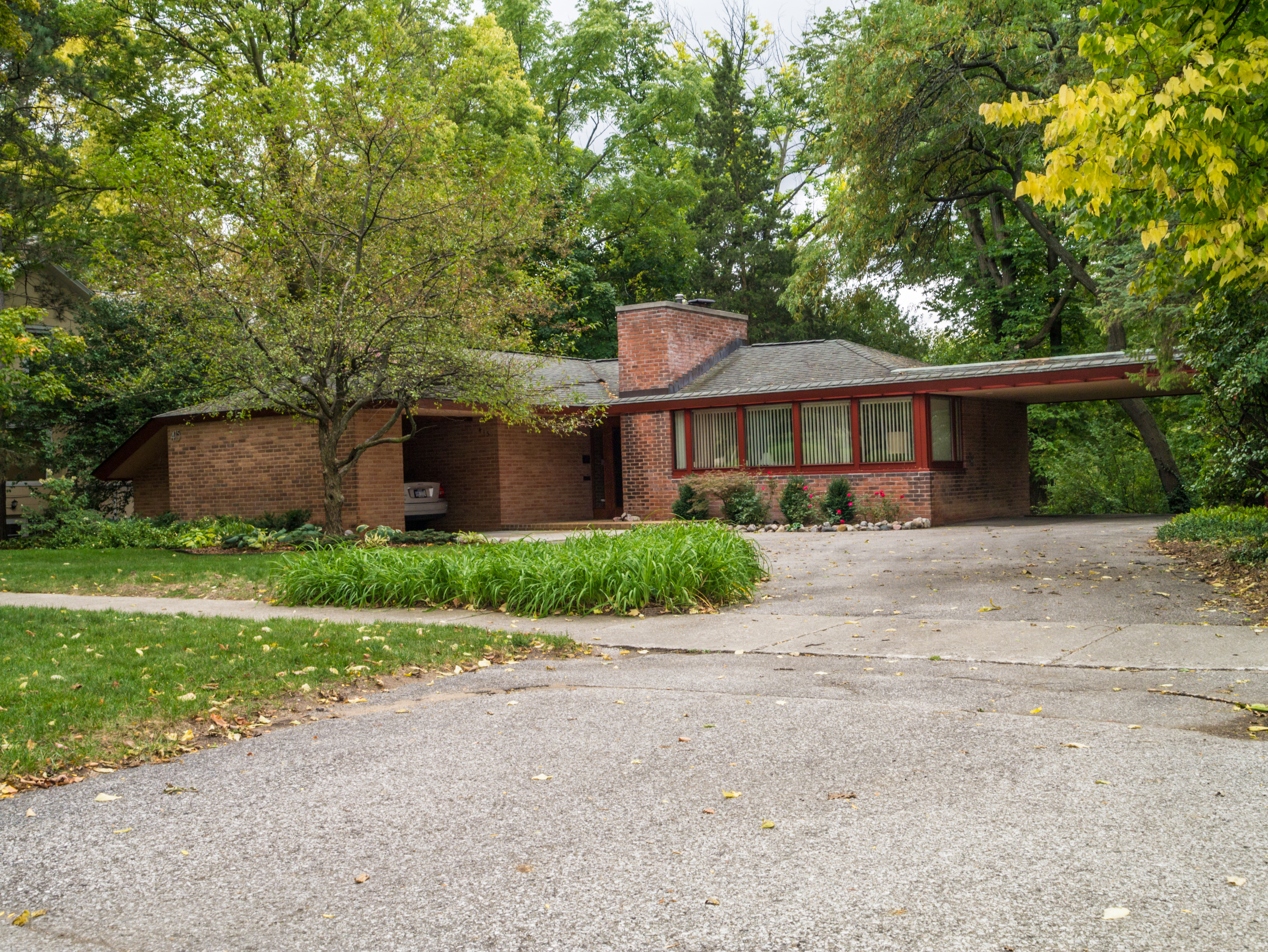
- Interactive map
- Location: 415 W. Main, Midland, Michigan
- Coordinates: 43°36′55″N 84°14′56″W
- Area: less than one acre
- Built: 1934
- Built by: Spence Brothers
- Architect: Alden B. Dow
- Architectural style: Prairie School
- MPS: Residential Architecture of Alden B. Dow in Midland 1933--1938 MPS
- NRHP reference No.: 89001434
- Added to NRHP: December 4, 1989

The Joseph A. Cavanagh House is a single-family home located at 415 West Main Street in Midland, Michigan. It was listed on the National Register of Historic Places in 1989. The house is architecturally significant because it demonstrates the beginnings of architect Alden B. Dow's interpretation of the Prairie Style.

== History ==
Joseph A. Cavanagh was a former mayor of Midland (serving in 1917-1920) who worked as an accountant for the Dow Chemical Company. In 1933, he asked Alden B. Dow, then working with Frank Lloyd Wright at Taliesin, to design this house. It was Dow's first independent commission. Construction began in 1934, with the work done by Spence Brothers of Saginaw, and was substantially completed in the summer of that year. Minor alterations were completed in the 1940s, and in about 1960 an additional carport was added to the house.

== Description ==
The Joseph A. Cavanagh House is a modest single-story wood-frame brick structure laid out in an L-shaped plan. A narrow element with a prominent brick chimney faces the street, while an integral carport is attached to the front corner of the house. The blankness of the front brick wall and chimney is balanced by a belt of four windows. The front section contains the living room and kitchen, while the rear wing contains the bedrooms and an enclosed porch. The rear elevation extends two stories.
