= Midland Country Club =

Golf course and club in Michigan

- Interactive map of Midland Country Club
- 43°37′48″N 84°14′35″W

Club information
- Established: 1928
- Type: Private
- Tota holes: 18
- Tournaments: Dow Championship
- Website: https://www.midlandcc.net

Midland Country Club is a country club and golf course in Midland, Michigan. The course hosts the LPGA Tour's Dow Championship.

== History ==
1943 image of the Midland Country Club's original clubhouse, which was demolished in 2009.

On October 14, 1926, residents of Midland gathered to discuss the building of a golf course in the town. A consortium of citizens interested in golf acquired more than 120 acres of farm land to build the new course. Gilbert Currie oversaw the original golf course design. The golf course were officially opened on July 1, 1928.

In 1930, architect Alden B. Dow designed the art-deco clubhouse and interiors of the first Midland Country Club. The clubhouse opened to members in 1931.

In 2009, the country club underwent a series of renovations to appeal to a new cohort of members. At the time, the club had 650 members. The facility's renovations aimed to make the club more family orientated. The historic club house was demolished for a new pool area and splash zone. A new clubhouse and fitness center were built during the three-year, $30 million renovation. The new clubhouse was opened in 2010.

In 2019, the course hosted the inaugural Dow Great Lakes Bay Invitational. In 2020, the event was cancelled. In May 2020, the course was heavily damaged by flooding when the nearby Tittabawassee River breached a dam.

In June 2025, the course will host the Dow Championship on the LPGA Tour. The 2025 event marks the sixth appearance of the event at the course.
