= Alden B. Dow =

American architect

- Born: Alden Ball Dow; April 10, 1904; Midland, Michigan, U.S.
- Died: August 20, 1983 (aged 79); Midland, Michigan, U.S.
- Education: Columbia University
- Occupation: Architect
- Known for: Alden B. Dow, Inc.
- Spouse: Vada Bennett Dow (m. 1931)
- Children: 3
- Parent(s): Herbert Henry Dow; Grace Anna Dow
- Website: abdow.org

Alden B. Dow (April 10, 1904 – August 20, 1983), an architect based in Midland, Michigan, was renowned for his contributions to the Michigan Modern style. Beginning in the 1930s, he designed more than 70 residences and dozens of churches, schools, civic and art centers, and commercial buildings during his 30+ year career. The Midland Center for the Arts, the 1950s Grace A. Dow Memorial Library (named in honor of his mother), his many contributions to Dow Gardens and his former residence, the Alden Dow House and Studio, are among the numerous examples of his work located in his hometown of Midland, Michigan. He is the son of industrialist Herbert Dow, the founder of the Dow Chemical Company, and his wife, philanthropist Grace A. Dow who in 1936 founded the Herbert H. and Grace A. Dow Foundation in memory of her husband. Dow is known for his prolific and striking Modernist architectural designs. He served on the board of Dow Chemical Company for most of his adult life.

== Biography ==
=== Education ===
Alden B. Dow attended Midland Public Schools through high school. He attended the University of Michigan to study engineering in preparation to join his father's chemical manufacturing company. After three years, Dow transferred as a student of architecture at Columbia University, where he graduated in 1931.

That year, he married Vada Bennett, also of Midland. Her father, Earl Bennett, was chairman of the board of directors at the Dow Chemical Company, a major employer in the city. The couple had three children together: Michael Lloyd Dow, Mary Lloyd Dow, and Barbara Alden Dow.

After working for a year and a half with the architectural firm of Frantz and Spence in nearby Saginaw, he and Vada studied with architect Frank Lloyd Wright at his Taliesin studio in Spring Green, Wisconsin, for the summer in 1933.

=== Early career ===
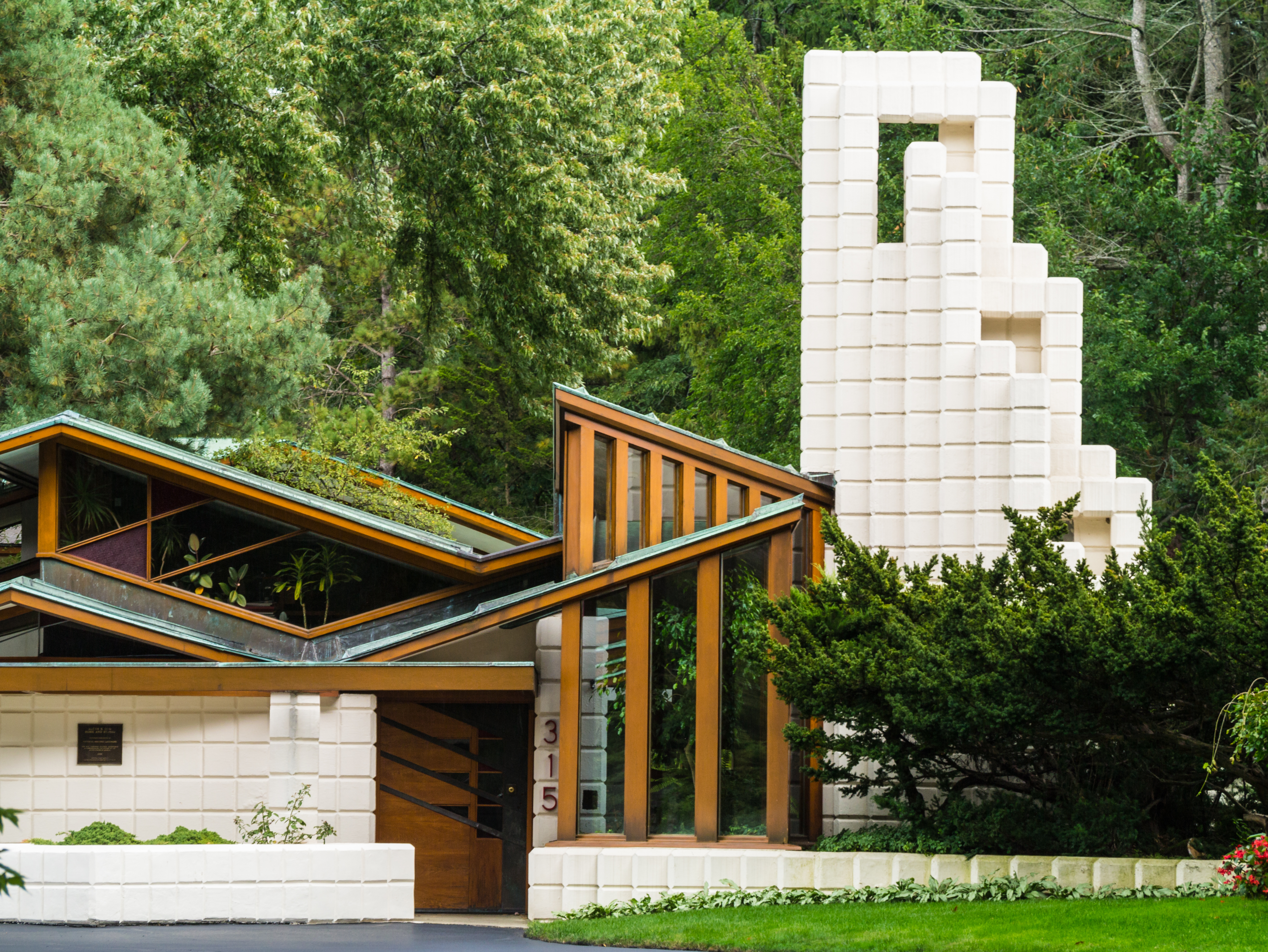
Alden Dow House and Studio

Following his brief ("a few months") apprenticeship with Frank Lloyd Wright, Dow opened his own studio in 1934 in Midland.

Dow described his own philosophy of design as "Architecture is more than the front face of the building. It is the location of the building. It is the plan of the building. It is the construction of the building. It is the heating and cooling of the building. It is the furnishing of the building. It is the landscaping of the building. It is, in its entirety, the manifestation of wholesome living."

He received the Diplome de Grand Prix at that 1937 Paris International Exposition for best residential design in the world, based on the design of his residence and also for his work on the John Whitman residence.

In 1941, Dow officially incorporated his business as Alden B. Dow, Inc. The following year, Dow was tasked with designing a company town in Texas for workers at his father's Dow Chemical Company's site near Freeport, Texas. With his brother Willard and Dow Chemical Company executive A.P. Beutel, Dow chose a site west of Freeport that was formerly the site of the Abner Jackson Plantation. Dow designed the town, which they named Lake Jackson, to hold 5,000 people. The residential layout was notable for its lack of straight streets; Dow felt that winding roads would provide "something of a surprise around each turn." The streets were given whimsical names, including the intersecting "This Way" and "That Way" as well as "Circle Way," "Winding Way," and "Any Way." Dow also provided the six designs used to build different models of houses within the newly created town. The first residents moved in at the end of 1943.

=== Growth ===
In 1963, he changed the business name to Alden B. Dow Associates, Inc., to reflect taking on more employees to accommodate growth. Dow designed the Fleming Administration Building at the University of Michigan in Ann Arbor, completed in 1968. The building houses the offices of the university's president. Its narrow windows (all located above the first floor) and fortress-like exterior led to a campus rumor that it was designed in the wake of the student activism of the 1960s to be riot-proof. Dow was purportedly offended by those rumors, insisting that the small windows were designed to be energy efficient.

As time passed, Dow began to delve into other types of architecture, designing many commercial and community buildings, especially in and around his hometown of Midland. Dow relinquished the chairmanship of his company in 1974 to Jim Howell.

In 1983, Dow was named the architect laureate of Michigan, an achievement in his 50-year career. He died shortly after, on August 20, 1983. That title has not been bestowed on anyone since Dow.

The company name was changed to Dow, Howell & Gilmore Associates Inc. after his death. It is owned by its employees.

Six years later, in 1989, Dow's residence was designated as a National Historic Landmark, both for its own architectural significance and the contributions of his career to national American architecture.

== Selected works ==
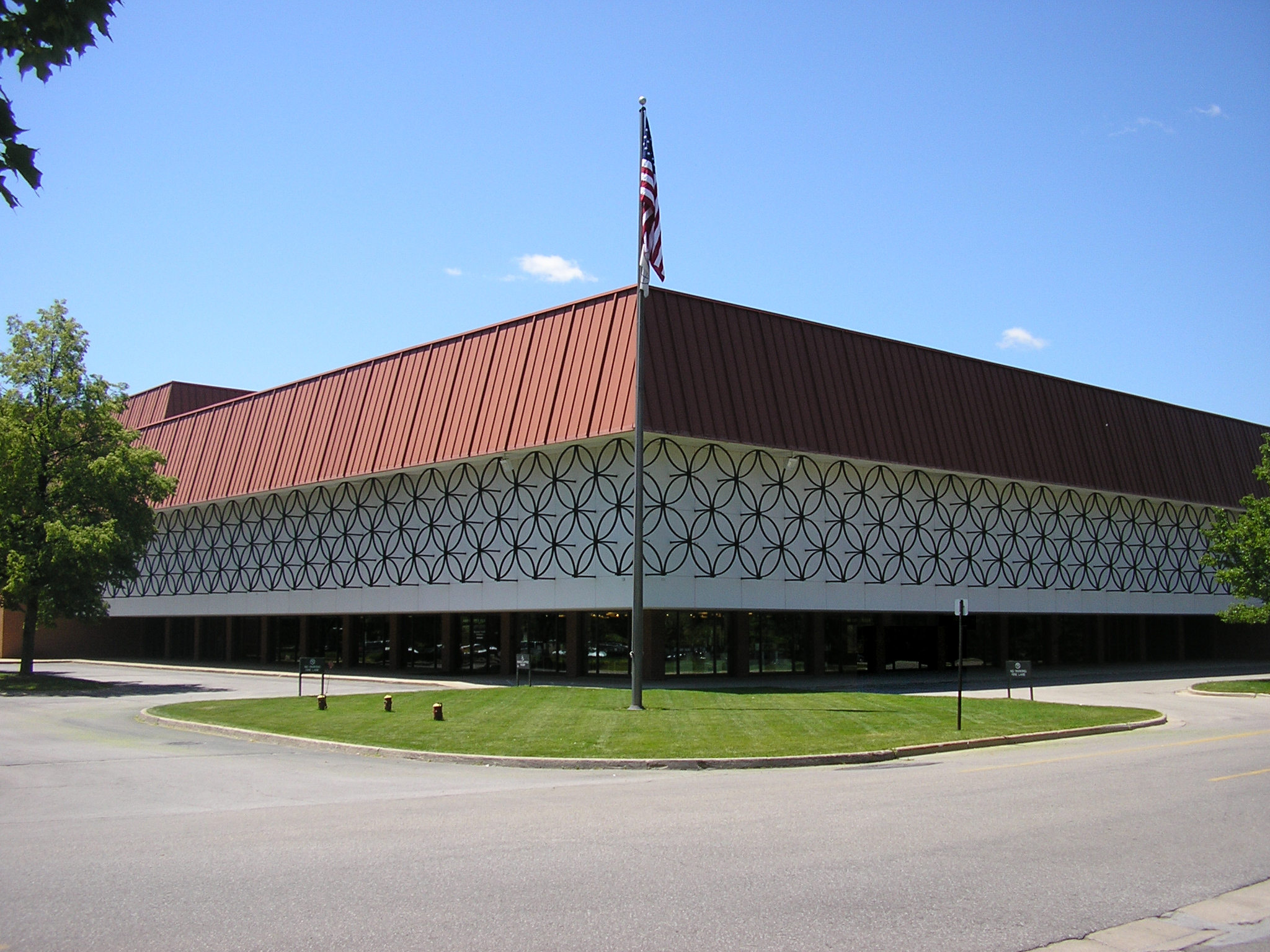
Midland Center for the Arts

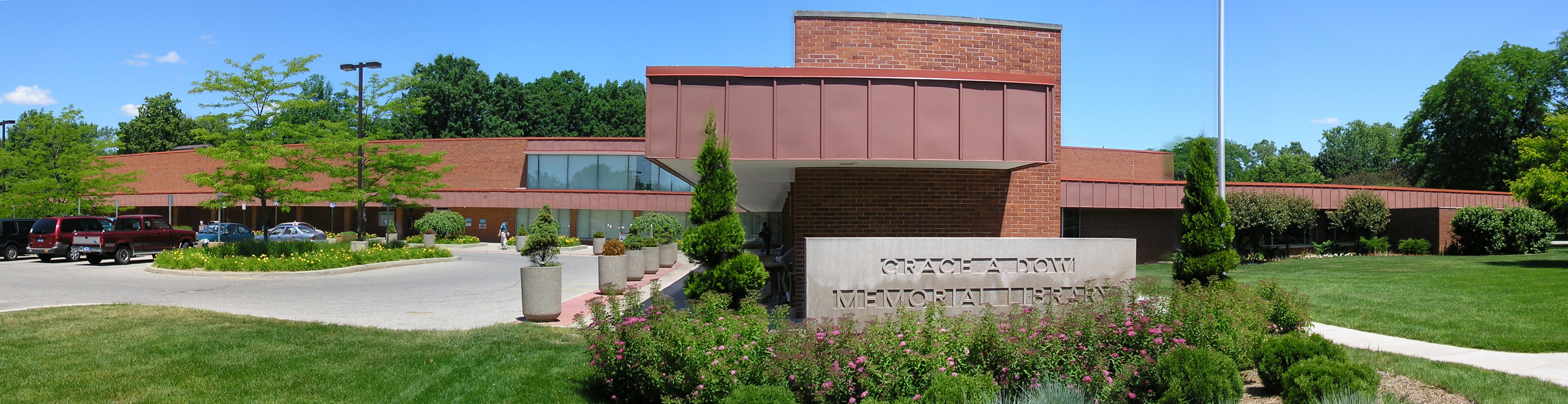
Grace A. Dow Memorial Library

=== Midland ===
- Midland Country Club (1930), Midland, Michigan (demolished 2010)
- Residential Architecture of Alden B. Dow in Midland, Michigan Multiple Property Submission, a National Register of Historic Places Multiple Property Submission consisting of the following 13 houses built in Midland, Michigan, from 1933 to 1938:
  - Earl Stein House (1933), 209 Revere, Midland, Michigan
  - F.W. Lewis House (1934), 2913 Manor, Midland, Michigan
  - Joseph A. Cavanagh House (1934), 415 W. Main, Midland, Michigan
  - Sheldon Heath House (1934), 1505 W. St. Andrews, Midland, Michigan
  - Alden Hanson House (1935), 1605 W. St. Andrews, Midland, Michigan
  - John S. Whitman House (1935), 2407 Manor, Midland, Michigan
  - Alden Dow House and Studio (1936), 315 Post St., Midland, Michigan, a National Historic Landmark
  - Charles MacCallum House (1936), 1227 W. Sugnet, Midland, Michigan
  - Howard Ball House (1935), 1411 W. St. Andrews, Midland, Michigan
  - Oscar C. Diehl House (1935), 919 E. Park, Midland, Michigan
  - George Greene House (1936), 1115 W. Sugnet, Midland, Michigan
  - Donald L. Conner House (1936), 2705 Manor, Midland, Michigan
  - James T. Pardee House (1936), 812 W. Main St., Midland, Michigan
- Dow Chemical Company Administrative Building (1937), also known as Dow Chemical Main Office, Midland, Michigan
- Midland Central Park Bandshell (1938), 515 West Collins St., Midland, Michigan restored 2012
- Midland Central Park Pool and Bathhouse (1938), 515 West Collins St., Midland, Michigan (replaced 1976)
- Parents' and Children's Schoolhouse (1938), 1505 Crane Ct., Midland, Michigan, NRHP-listed
- Calvin A. and Alta Koch Campbell House (1939), 1210 W. Park Dr., Midland, Michigan, NRHP-listed
- Mr. and Mrs. Robert C. Reinke House (1941), 33 Lexington Court, Midland, Michigan, NRHP-listed
- Mr. and Mrs Frank Boonstra House (1941), 1401 Helen St., Midland, Michigan, NRHP-listed
- Donald and Louise Clark Irish House (1941), 1801 W. Sugnet Rd., Midland, Michigan, NRHP-listed
- Mr. and Mrs. Louis P. Butenschoen House (1941), 1212 Helen St., Midland, Michigan, NRHP-listed
- Charles and Mary Kempf Penhaligen House (1941), 1203 W. Sugnet Rd., Midland, Michigan, NRHP-listed
- Midland Hospital (1943), later known as MidMichigan Medical Center-Midland, built around a courtyard garden, Midland, Michigan
- Grace A. Dow Memorial Library (1953), Midland, Michigan (renovated 2013)
- Herbert Henry Dow II Residence (1953)
- Midland Community Center (1953), Midland, Michigan (demolished 2024)
- Midland Skating Rink (1954), Midland, Michigan (demolished 2006)
- Fire Station No. 1 (1955), Midland, Michigan
- Midland County Courthouse Jail and Office addition (1955), 301 West Main Street, Midland, Michigan
- St. John's Lutheran Church (1955), 505 East Carpenter Street, Midland, Michigan
- Smith's Flowers & Gifts (1955), 2909 Ashman Street, Midland, Michigan
- King's Daughters Home (1956), Midland, Michigan
- Northwood University (1960's) Midland
- Midland Center for the Arts (1968), Midland, Michigan
- Cleveland Manor I (1968), 2200 Cleveland Avenue Senior/low-income 105-unit Housing Complex
- Downtown Farmers Market (1973), Midland, Michigan
- Dow Gardens Master Plan (1974), Midland, Michigan
- Lower Pond Bridge and Upper Pond Bridge (1975), Midland, Michigan
- Visitor Center (1976), Midland, Michigan
- Sun Bridge (1979), Midland, Michigan
- Chemical Bank and Trust Company, Midland, Michigan
- Dow Center Complex, Midland, Michigan
- First United Methodist Church, Midland, Michigan

=== Other Tri-Cities (along with Midland) ===
- Bay City, Bay County War Memorial
- Bay City, Thomas and Marjorie Defoe House (1949)
- Bay City, Messiah Evangelical Lutheran Church (1956)
- Bay City, People's National Bank and Trust Company (1962)
- Saginaw, Mary Dow House (1936)

=== Ann Arbor ===
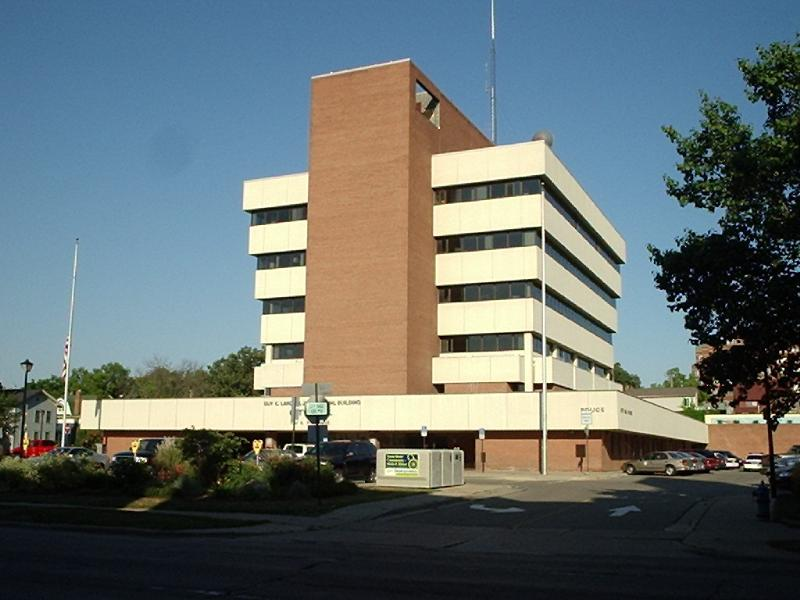
Ann Arbor City Hall

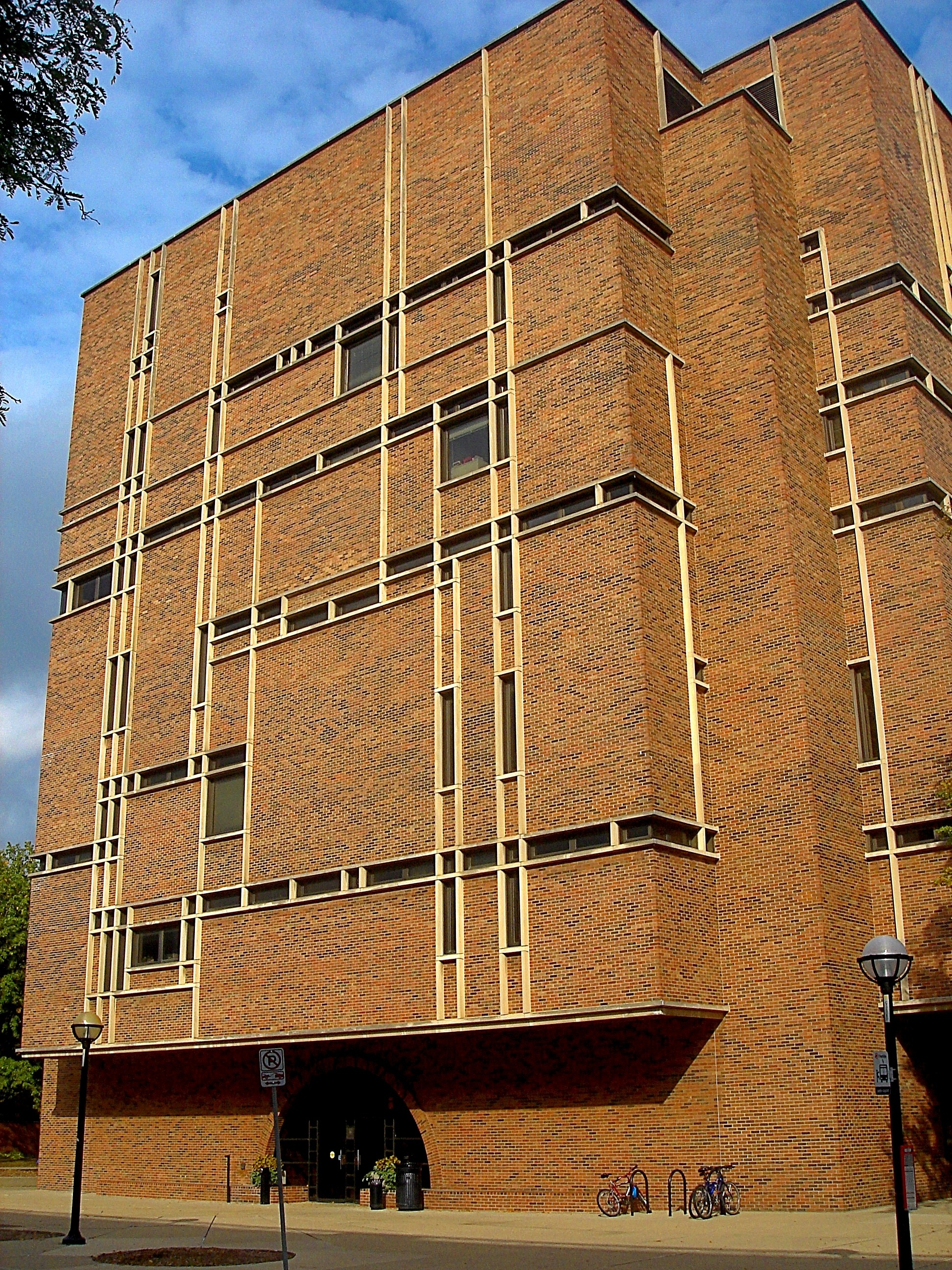
Fleming Administration Building (demolished 2022)

- Harry and Margaret Towsley House (1932), Ann Arbor, Michigan, built for Dow's sister and her husband. It was the "first residence in the country designed with an attached garage facing the street."
- University of Michigan Women's Swimming Pool, Margaret Bell Building (1950), Ann Arbor, Michigan
- Ann Arbor Public Library (1955 or 1956), Ann Arbor, Michigan
- University of Michigan Botanical Gardens (1958), Ann Arbor, Michigan
- Ann Arbor Community Center (1958), Ann Arbor, Michigan
- Dunbar Community Center (1958), Ann Arbor, Michigan
- Leonard Service Station (1960), Ann Arbor, Michigan
- Institute for Social Research (1960), University of Michigan, Ann Arbor, Michigan
- Ann Arbor City Hall (1960), also known as Guy C. Larcom, Jr. Municipal Building, 301 East Huron Street, Ann Arbor, Michigan
- Conductron Corporation Offices (1961), Ann Arbor, Michigan
- University Microfilms Building (1963), Ann Arbor, Michigan
- Fleming Administration Building (1964), Ann Arbor, Michigan (demolished 2022) he University of Michigan's central administration building, designed in 1964 by Michigan's architect laureate Alden Dow, is named the Robben W. & Aldyth Fleming Administration Building. The board of regents approved an infrastructure plan in 2016 that will result in the demolition of the Fleming Building, but university president Mark Schlissel said the school would find another way to continue commemorating Fleming, whom he called one of his personal heroes. Demolition began in August, 2022. The building was considered functionally obsolescent.
- University of Michigan Continuing Education Center (1965), Ann Arbor, Michigan
- Greenhills School (1967), 850 Greenhills Dr., Ann Arbor, Michigan

=== Bloomfield Hills ===
- Gordon Saunders House (1936)
- Hellenic Orthodox Community Church of St. George (1962), also known as Saint George Greek Orthodox Church, 43816 Woodward Avenue
- Lynn A. & Ruth M. Townsend House (1963), 1485 Kirkway

=== Kalamazoo ===
- Paul & Josephine C. Rood House (1937)
- Kalamazoo Christian Church (1957)
- Kalamazoo Nature Center (1961)
- Kalamazoo Valley Community College (1966)

=== Elsewhere ===
==== Michigan ====
- Algonac, LeRoy Smith House (1940), 9503 Frank St., NRHP-listed
- Dearborn, First Presbyterian Church (1964)
- Detroit, Wayne State University Center Building (1963)
- Detroit, Wayne State University Physical Education & Recreation Building (1961)
- East Lansing, Bachman House (1936)
- East Lansing, Eastminster Presbyterian Church (1961)
- East Grand Rapids, Miner Keeler residence, 2525 Indian Trl SE (1958)
- Grosse Pointe Farms 96 Handy RD (1939/1940) Clark & Mary Wells House
- Grosse Pointe Park, Pryor House (1936)
- Mount Pleasant, Brown House (1937)
- Muskegon, Muskegon Community College (1965)
- Port Huron, Henry McMorran Auditorium and Sports Arena (1961)
- Roscommon, Michigan, Earl Bennett Cottage (1936), Benmark's Club

==== Other states ====
- Phoenix, Arizona, Phoenix Civic Center and Art Museum (1954), with Blaine Drake
- Elkhart, Indiana, William and Helen Koerting House (1936)
- Durham, North Carolina, Douglas M. and Grace Knight House (1966)
- Lake Jackson, Texas, Alden B. Dow Office and Lake Jackson City Hall, 101 S. Parking Place, NRHP-listed

== Foundation ==
The Alden and Vada Dow Family Foundations were established beginning in 1960 to assist Midland and the surrounding communities. They fund programs in the arts, education, the environment, youth programs and health & human services. Grants are limited to other non-profit organizations in Central Michigan and the Northern lower peninsula with a focus on Bay, Saginaw and Midland Counties. They are a 501(c)(3) tax-exempt organization and their office is in Midland. As of 2023, they had assets of approximately $6 million, yearly expenditures of $1.15 million and revenue of $1.7 million. Trustees of the Foundation are all descendants of Alden & Vada.

The Alden and Vada Dow Creativity Foundation was founded in 1986 after Alden's death by Vada and her children. The stated mission is to "preserve, share and encourage exploration of the philosophies of Alden B. Dow" This is accomplished via educational programs, research opportunities in the archives of Alden Dow and Alden B. Dow Home and Studio tours.

There are two entities that award grants: the Vada B. Dow Charitable Unitrust supports the creativity foundation; the Alden and Vada Dow Fund underwrites the majority of activity.

== Awards ==
- Diplome de Grand Prix at the Paris Exposition of 1937 for best residential design in the world, based on his own home and design studio and also the John Whitman residence
- Received honorary degrees from Albion College, Hillsdale College, Michigan State University, Northwood University and the University of Michigan.
- In 1957 became a Fellow in the American Institute of Architects (AIA).
- Awarded The Michigan Society of Architects Gold Medal for 1960.
- The Northwood University Alden B. Dow Creativity Center was founded in 1978 to honor and perpetuate his commitment to quality and innovation.
- First recipient of the Frank Lloyd Wright Creativity Award in 1982.
- In 1983 named Architect Laureate of his home state of Michigan.
- The Alden B. Dow Museum of Science & Art in Midland, Michigan is named in his honor.
