= Herbert H. and Grace A. Dow Foundation =

Nonprofit organization in Midland, Michigan, United States

Herbert H & Grace A Dow Foundation
- Abbreviation: HHAGADF
- Established: December 26, 1936; 89 years ago
- Type: 501(c)(3) nonprofit organization
- Tax ID no.: 38-1437485
- Headquarters: 1018 West Main Street, Midland, Michigan, US
- Coordinates: 43.6137°N 84.2460°W
- President: Ruth A. Doan
- Key people: Michael Lloyd Doan; Willard Mott; Diane Dow Hullet; Suzanna Mccuan
- Revenue: $40,934,354 (2023)
- Expenses: $45,144,955 (2023)
- Endowment: $596,689,323 (2023)
- Website: hhgadowfdn.org

The Herbert H. and Grace A. Dow Foundation (HHAGADF) is the oldest charitable funding organization based in Midland, Michigan and eighth largest in Michigan. During 2023, gifts from the foundation exceeded $45 million and in their 88-year history, $682,920,802 has been disbursed.

== Foundation ==
The HHAGADF was founded by Mrs. Grace A. Dow in 1936 to commemorate Herbert Henry Dow, her husband. The foundation's stated purpose is “for religious, charitable, scientific, literary, or educational purposes for the public benefaction of the inhabitants of the said City of Midland and of the people of the State of Michigan”. Her motto was: "Let service be our Motto and Good Deeds Our Badge."

In 1974 the HHAGADF purchased the 3.4-acre (1.4 ha) property south of The Pines, Herbert Dow's original family home. The 6,394 sq ft (594.0 m^{2}) structure was built in 1917. A 12,907 sq ft (1,199.1 m^{2}) commercial building was constructed north of the residence for use as a second HHAGADF administrative office. A covered walkway connects the two buildings. It is currently part of the Dow Gardens property and there is a pathway from the offices to the Gardens.

The foundation does not provide grants to individuals; only non-profit 501-c-3 organizations may request project funding. Some subject areas for grants include:

- health care and research
- educational institutions
- general support for communities
- the arts and music
- social services
- activities for youth
- churches

== Gardens ==
The Dow Gardens are a 110-acre (45 ha) botanical garden located at 1809 Eastman Avenue in Midland. It was started in 1899 by Herbert Henry Dow for his family. The gardens are open to the public; admission is charged. Guests are encouraged to exit the walkways and explore the landscape, engage in an educational program or amble along the nation's longest canopy walks. Steve Mannheimer, art & architecture critic for the Indianapolis Star and professor at Herron School of Art and Design wrote: "Visitors to Dow Gardens lose the smells and the sounds of the Midwest – burgers, fries and traffic - to find a vision of nature perfected. The back door of Eden has been opened." Dow Gardens are a "signature gift" from the foundation to the Midland community, Michigan and the world.

== House ==
The 1899 Pines of Dow Gardens is located at the southwest corner of the campus. Declared a National Historic Landmark in 1976, visitors are welcomed to limited guided tours. A separate admission is charged but it is not ADA-accessible. The home still contains the furnishings from the Dow family, and provides a detailed view of their lives in the first half of the twentieth century. The home contains many items utilized by Dow family members; trained docents share stories to make these artifacts come to life. Visitors can see the books read by the children of Herbert and Grace and clothing worn by Mrs. Dow.

== Significant grants ==
- Herbert H. & Grace A Dow College of Health Professions at Central Michigan University.
- Herbert Henry Dow Science Building, Hillsdale College
- Herbert H Dow Building, University of Michigan 2012
- Herbert H. and Barbara C. Dow Center for Visual Arts, (Music Center) Interlochen Center for the Arts
- Dow Science Building, Interlochen Center for the Arts
- $8.5 million facility for Academy Dormitory and Art Camp Faculty Quarters Interlochen Center for the Arts
- Mackinac Center for Public Policy
- The Grace A. Dow Memorial Library completed a major renovation project with a $3 million grant from HHAGADF that celebrated their 75th anniversary. Alden Dow, son of Grace & Herbert Dow, was the original architect.
- $5 million grant to Michigan Technological University to renovate their Chemical Sciences and Engineering Building.
- $4 million grant for renovations to the NADA Hotel and Conference Center at Northwood University.
- The 1926 Midland County Courthouse was renovated in 2018 to modernize including new elevators, electrical, plumbing, HVAC and fire suppression at a cost of nearly $8.5 million. The HHAGADF contributed $1.5 million toward the project.
- Dow Hotel and Conference Center at Hillsdale College was completed in 1964, funded by HHAGADF.

== Trustees ==
The trustees have traditionally been members of the Dow family.

=== Current ===
As of 2023, the officers were:

- Ruth Alden Doan, President
- Michael L. Dow, Vice President
- Willard A. Mott, Treasurer
- Diane Hullet, Secretary

The trustees were:

- Stephen P. Carras
- Alden Lee Hanson
- Bonnie Buchanan Matheson
- Suzanna McCuan
- Lilla Y. M. Ohrstrom
- Sarah Opperman
- Stephanie R. Scheets
- Macauley Whiting Jr.

The associate trustees were:

- David Inglish
- Kharissa Jacobsen
- Sydney Noah

=== Presidents ===
- Willard Dow 1936–1947
- Alden B. Dow 1947 to 1970
- Herbert Henry Dow II 1970–1996
- Ted Doan 1996–2006
- Margaret Ann Riecker 2000–2014
- Macauley (Mike) Whiting Jr. 2014–2019
- Ruth Alden Doan 2019–present

== See also ==
- Herbert Henry Dow
- Grace A. Dow
- Dow Chemical Company
- Dow Gardens
- Herbert H. Dow House
- Herbert Henry Dow High School
