= Alden Dow House and Studio =

House in Midland, Michigan

Coordinates: 43.6241°N 84.2533°W

- Alden B. Dow House and Studio
- U.S. National Register of Historic Places
- U.S. National Historic Landmark
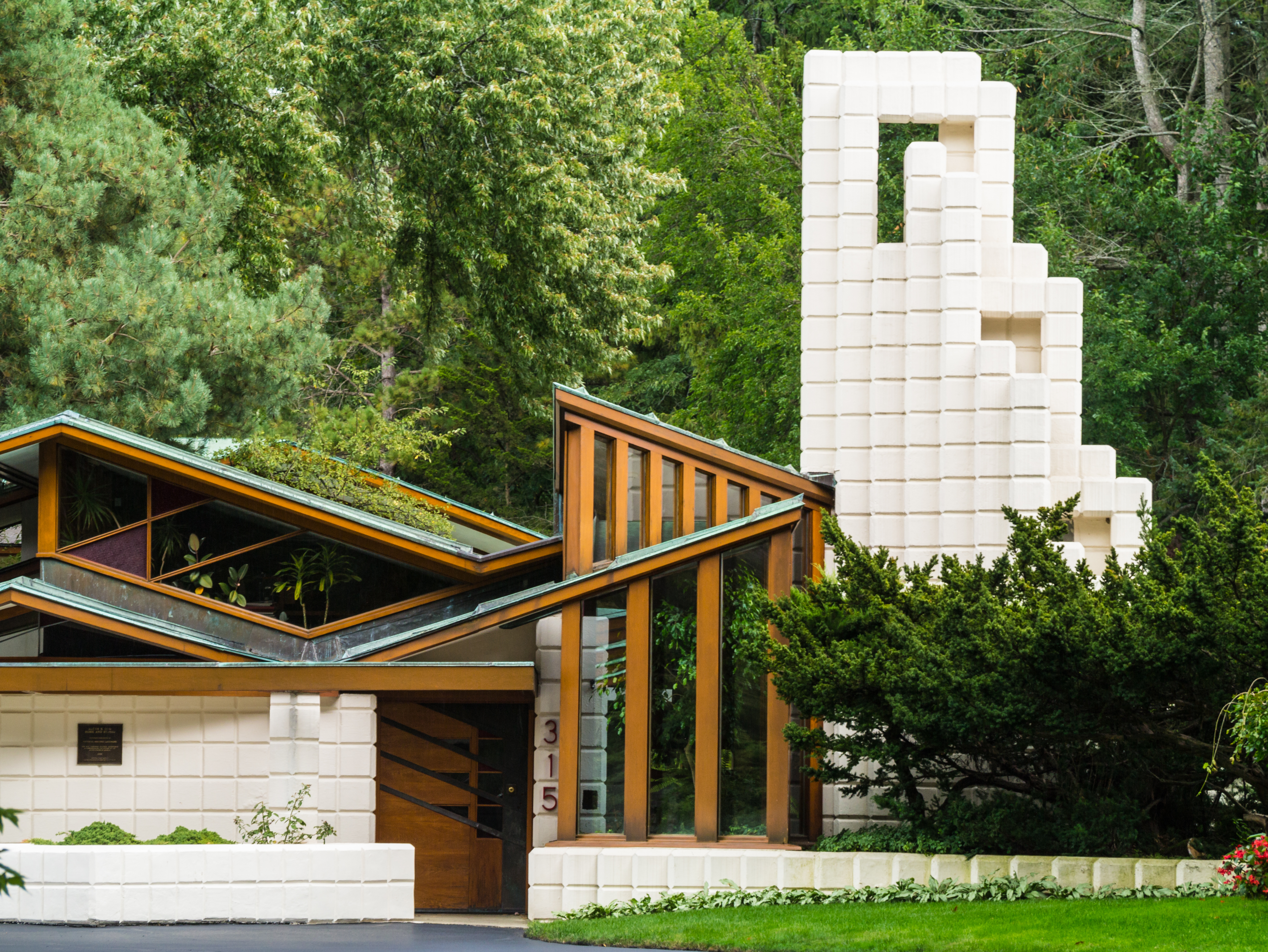
- Interactive map
- Location: 315 Post St., Midland, Michigan
- Area: 27.2 acres (11.0 ha)
- Built: 1936
- Architect: Alden B. Dow
- NRHP reference No.: 89001167

Significant dates
- Added to NRHP: June 29, 1989
- Designated NHL: June 29, 1989

The Alden B. Dow Home and Studio is the home and studio of 20th-century architect Alden B. Dow, located in Midland, Michigan,. The quality and originality of his work, as well as his association with Frank Lloyd Wright, have earned him lasting national recognition.

== History ==
Construction for the first studio began in 1934, while the majority of the United States was struggling through the Great Depression. With the Dow Chemical Company located in Midland Michigan, the community had not been hit as hard as the rest of the country. Being that Alden was a child of the Dow Chemical founder, Herbert H. Dow, he had many opportunities within Midland to practice architecture. The first studio was completed in 1935 and construction for the second studio began in 1936. The second studio was completed in 1937. The studio was created as a workplace for Alden's architectural firm. As well as the two drafting rooms, there was also an entry and reception area and the sunken conference room, which sits below water level. The pond was created by diverting the stream that ran through the property. The studio portion also had a woodshop, an office and Alden's office which was the buffer between the studio and home. The woodshop has been turned into a museum with a gift shop.

Dow built his home and studio between 1937 and 1940. Throughout the home there are visible construction materials including the building blocks that were patented in 1935, "Unit Blocks". Alden Dow's exploration of block construction began after graduating from the Columbia School of Architecture in 1931 and an eight-month apprenticeship at Taliesin in 1933. Alden Dow, along with Robert Goodall, one of Frank Lloyd Wright's draftsman, created a rhomboid block, mostly with a square face in 16 different sizes. This became known as Alden B. Dow's Unit Block building system. Dow used them to form walls and terraces, as well as decoration elements such as the stepping stones in the surrounding pond on the property. In addition to the unique shape and structural integrity of the building blocks, the other identifying characteristic of the Unit Blocks was that they were made of the cinder that he saw piling up outside The Dow Chemical Company furnaces. His father, Herbert Dow, had utilized this same cinder waste to construct “clinker” bridges in their family gardens (now Dow Gardens).

== Awards ==
It was declared a National Historic Landmark in 1989. It was awarded the Paris Prize for Residential Architecture in 1937. Traditional Home magazine listed the Alden B. Dow Home and Studio on a 2014 list of "The 25 Best Historic Homes in America", Great Estates: A new look at historic house museums

== Public access ==
The house is open to the public for tours and abuts the Dow Gardens.

== See also ==
- List of National Historic Landmarks in Michigan
- National Register of Historic Places listings in Midland County, Michigan
