= Dow Gardens =

Botanical garden in Midland, Michigan, US

- Location within Michigan Location within the United States
- Interactive map
- Founded: 1899; 127 years ago
- Founder: Herbert Henry Dow
- Type: Educational 501(c)(3)
- Tax ID no.: 47-1388717
- Location: 1809 Eastman Avenue, Midland, Michigan, U.S.
- Coordinates: 43.6232°N 84.2485°W
- Origins: family recreation
- Region served: Michigan
- Key people: Elizabeth Lumbert, Garden Director
- Revenue: $1.48 million (2023)
- Expenses: $4.15 million (2023)
- Employees: 35
- Volunteers: 100+
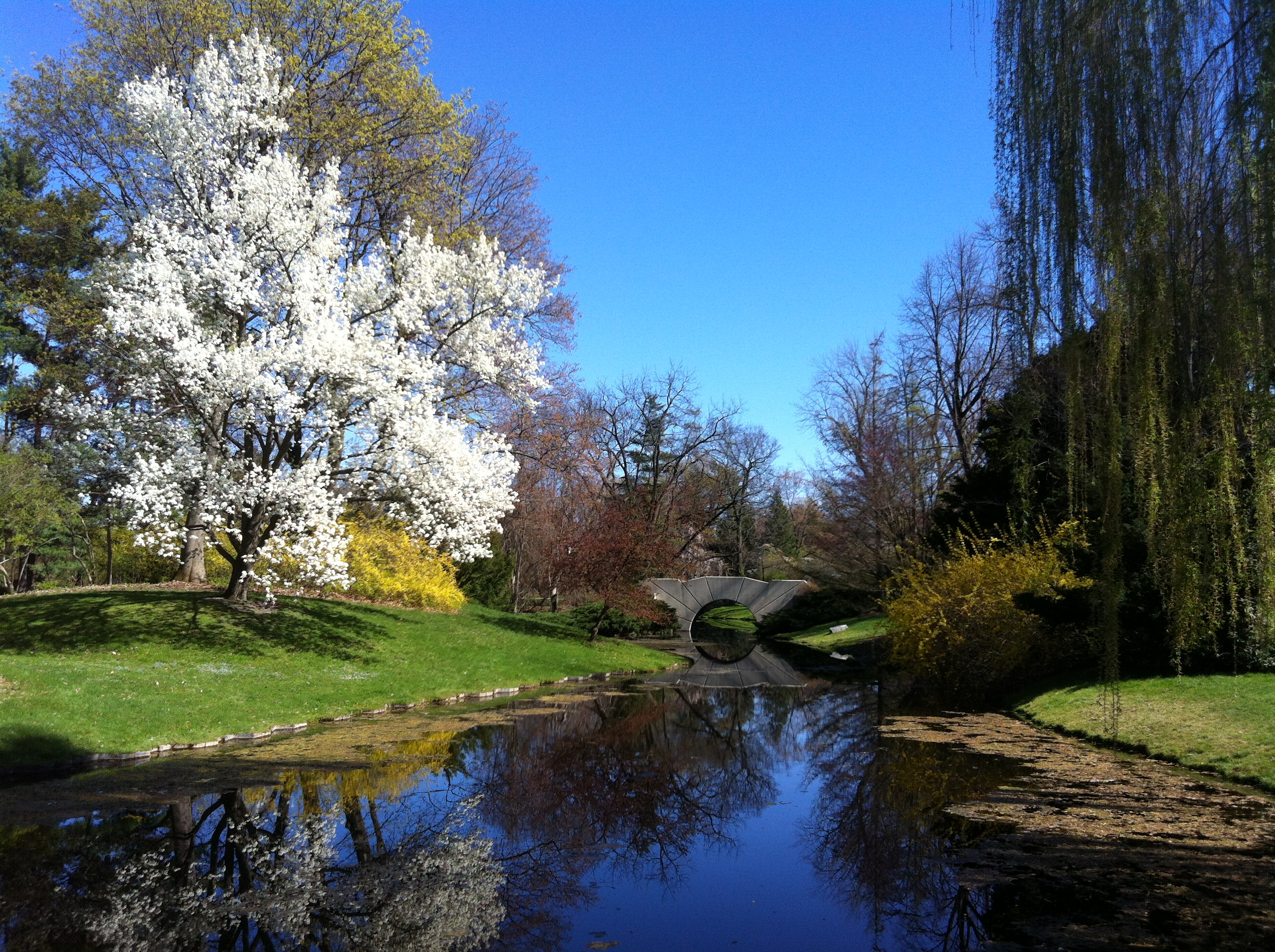
- Dow Gardens in the spring
- Type: Botanical garden
- Area: 110 acres (45 ha; 0.17 mi^{2}; 0.45 km^{2})
- Owner: Herbert H. and Grace A. Dow Foundation
- Operator: Herbert H & Grace A Dow Foundation
- Visitors: 225,000 (in 2024)
- Open: Tuesday - Sunday, 9:00 a.m. to 8:00 p.m.
- Parking: 723
- Facilities: 1,400 feet (426.7 m) Canopy walkway 4,096 sq ft (380.5 m^{2}) Conservatory
- Website: Official website

Dow Gardens is a 110-acre (45 ha) botanical garden at 1809 Eastman Avenue, Midland, Michigan, United States. It was started in 1899 by Herbert Henry Dow (b. 1866) who founded the Dow Chemical Company in 1897. The gardens are open to the public; admission is charged. Guests are encouraged to engage in an educational program, step back in history for a tour of the Pines Home, amble along the nation's longest canopy walkway or exit the walkways and freely explore the landscape. Steve Mannheimer, art & architecture critic for the Indianapolis Star and professor at Herron School of Art and Design wrote: "Visitors to Dow Gardens lose the smells and the sounds of the Midwest – burgers, fries and traffic - to find a vision of nature perfected. The back door of Eden has been opened."

== Foundation ==
Upon Herbert's passing in 1930, the Herbert H. and Grace A. Dow Foundation was founded by Grace. Its charter states that it seeks to "improve the educational, religious, economic, and cultural lives of the people of the City of Midland and the State of Michigan". The foundation owns and operates Dow Gardens and considers it a "significant gift" to visitors and the local community.

== New Welcome Center ==
In honor of 125 years of beauty and tranquility, ground was broken on September 19, 2024 for a new 22,200 sq ft (2,060 m^{2}) Welcome Center that replaced the 6,600 sq ft (610 m^{2}) structure that had been in use since 1977 and was originally designed for 60,000 visitors each year. The new Welcome Center can accommodate up to 250,000 guests per year, as the Gardens now hosts between 200,000 and 250,000 a year. Changes include increasing parking to 723 spaces, multiple restrooms, and accommodations for special events including reunions, weddings and business meetings. It officially opened Friday, June 19, 2026.

== History ==
Dow Gardens began as the property purchased by Herbert Henry Dow prior to the construction of a home for himself, his wife Grace A. Dow, and seven children, including Alden B. Dow and Willard Dow. Even before the home was completed, Dow began improving the land surrounding it for the enjoyment of his family. Elzie Cote became Dow's family gardener in 1900, working for Grace after Herbert died in 1930. In addition to his expertise in chemistry, Dow was passionate about the cultivation of flowers, fruits, vegetables and ornamental plants.

In the spring of 1899 Dow sent an order with a check for $2036 to a Rochester, New York nursery. In 2025 dollars that would be $78,447.08 He received 35 varieties of fruit trees, 10 types of grapes and 4 lilac cultivars. After he planted the 92 trees, he sent a note to his father, saying, "I planted an orchard yesterday." He was a noted pomologist and botanist. Although his orchard was never commercially viable, his experiments, close observations and detailed notes contributed to the body of scientific knowledge concerning plums, pears and his favorite, apples. Dow built a barn for livestock and a greenhouse for plants. For his family's recreation, features were added including a swimming pool, a maze, water elements with bridges and flower beds.

The Dow family voyaged to Hawaii and Japan in 1922. On the ship, they met a young Cornell graduate, Paul Tonow, returning home to Japan. In conversations, Herbert favored the Japanese gardening ideals of maximizing usage of a space and not being able to view the entire garden from one location. Dr. Dow looked forward to implementing new ideas. A few years later, Dr. Dow invited Tonow to visit Midland for the summer and share backyard ideas in the community. Tonow did not work at or for Dow Gardens. Marty McGuire, gardens director at Dow Gardens from 2007 to 2014, stated that people began visiting the gardens before the death of Herbert Dow in 1930, with Boy Scouts leading organized groups. For forty years from Herbert Dow's death in 1930 until 1970, the gardens were simply maintained. Amy Hurlbert authored a brief, History of Dow Gardens to 1987. She stated, "The Gardens were in limbo until around 1973, when they underwent major changes." In the late 1960s, newspapers and other publications were repeating a rumor that Paul Tonow had designed the Dow Gardens. The myth angered Alden Dow, who wrote a letter to a friend protesting and looking for a remedy.

Herbert Henry Dow II, son of Willard Dow, led the Dow Foundation from 1970. The foundation decided the property should become a premier botanical garden. John W. Campbell was engaged to create a master plan. Campbell, a noted landscape architect from Charlevoix, Michigan, visited several significant gardens and studied the Midland property before completing the plan December 11, 1974. Alden B. Dow, son of Herbert and Grace, provided input and oversight on the revitalization project, which lasted for three years. He hired Doug Chapman as gardens' first director in 1974, and the gardens were augmented with trees and plants not typically found in Michigan. He enhanced Dr. Dow's vision of the visitor finding something new around every twist and turn. Chapman retired in 2007. Dow Gardens, a private park accessible by the public, officially reopened in 1978.

The pathways in the garden are three types. The primary pathways are hard surface, and there are 1.5 miles of those in both the gardens and Whiting Forest. Concrete and asphalt were traditionally used, but the gardens need a material that is non-slip in rainy and snowy conditions; porous for water and air to reach the soil. A material made of equal parts aggregate and recycled rubber was successfully tested on a small area in 2017. The following year, 20,000 sq ft (1,900 m^{2}) of permeable paving was poured to create a loop of one-half mile. Secondary paths are mulch with tree bark to a depth of 4"; stone pathways are used in special locations.

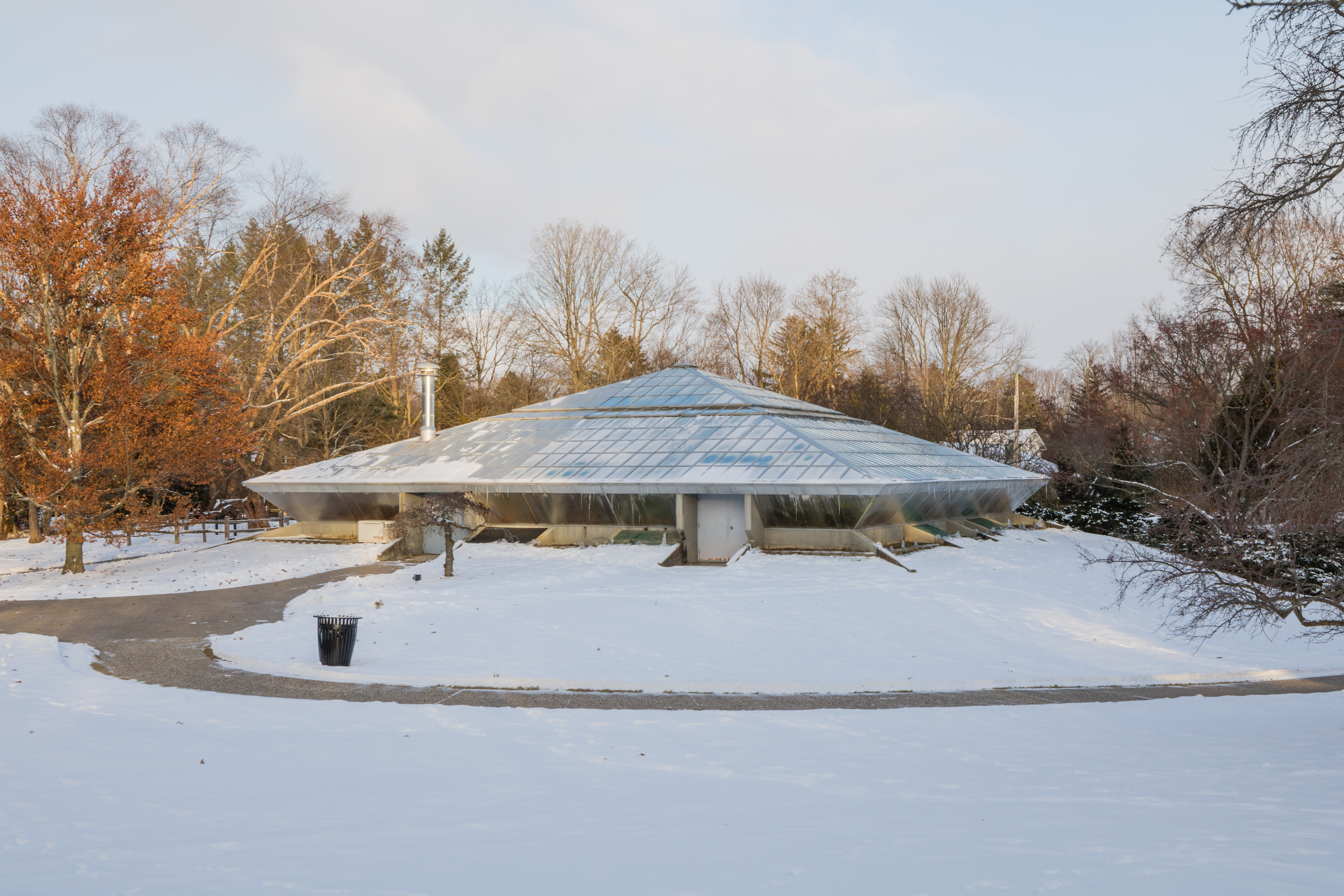
Dow Gardens conservatory in winter

== Attractions ==
In addition to the visitor center and gift shop are the Children's Garden, Estate Garden, Exploration Garden, Rose Garden, Color Garden, Herb Garden, Secret Garden, Yew Maze, Founder's Circle and Orchard. Along the nearly 3 miles of hard-surface pathways are boulder pass & waterfall and pineside, all ADA-accessible. When the snow finally melts, 22,000 flowering bulbs and 35,000 annuals bloom. Each year the Dow Gardens uses a variety of perennials and annual bedding plants as part of the summer botanical display.

=== Conservatory ===
Dow's original greenhouse was replaced by one designed by his son, Alden in 1975, part of the 1970s enhancements. That building had a 64 by 64 foot concrete block base for 4,096 sq ft (380.5 m^{2}). The glass panels on the roof formed a pyramid. It opened for public viewing in the spring of 1976 and is now called the conservatory. 2022 renovations included a new bright and airy lobby, replacement of all 432 2-inch glass roof panels with low emissive, double-pane panels, an HVAC system that automatically adjusts based on inside and outside temperature and humidity. The new concrete water feature is unique and is highlighted by a new LED lighting system. The conservatory's Butterflies in Bloom program every March is their most popular exhibit. Elizabeth Lumbert, director of Dow Gardens reiterated their pledge to sustainable design. "We remain committed to preserving the historical integrity of the Dow Gardens Conservatory which converges gracefully with the surrounding landscape, provides an oasis during cold Michigan winters, and inspires a love of plants in future generations."

=== The Pines ===
The 1899 Pines of Dow Gardens is located at the southwest corner of the campus. As a National Historic Landmark, The Pines welcomes visitors for guided tours and special events. A separate admission is charged but it is not ADA-accessible. The home, which is still filled with the Dow family's furnishings, provides an intimate look into their life in the first half of the twentieth century. The home contains many items utilized by Dow family members; trained docents share stories to make these artifacts come to life. Visitors can see the books read by the children of Herbert and Grace and clothing worn by Mrs. Dow.

=== Whiting Forest ===
The Whiting Forest project was a relatively recent addition to Dow Gardens. The intent was to help people engage and reconnect with nature instead of staying inside playing video games or looking at their phones. The president of the Herbert H. and Grace A. Dow Foundation, Mike Whiting elaborated:

What is now Whiting Forest was my backyard as a kid. My brother and I spent countless hours there, climbing trees, catching frogs, skating on the ponds, even building our own cabin—we created our own adventures. When conceptualizing the Whiting Forest project, we focused on how to bring that childhood experience to others and how to instill in people an appreciation of nature.

In 2015, Metcalfe Architecture & Design began work on a Comprehensive Master Plan that would feature the nation's longest canopy walks to connect Dow Gardens with Whiting Forest above busy West St Andrews Road. The original topography of the forest included Snake Creek and a portion of the original Dow apple orchard among 54 acres of northern pine trees. Other new structures included a visitor center, an art studio, an amphitheater a forest classroom and a café renovation.

Construction began in 2016 on the $20 Million project.

The existing structure of the Whiting Forest Café was completely renovated with large windows and skylights providing natural light. The café's large patio overlooks an outdoor playground, so parents and caregivers can relax with a beverage while keeping an eye on their charges.

The canopy walk is suspended up to 40 feet above the ground and is 1,400 feet long. It has three branches that lead to different areas of the forest. On one branch there is a small enclosure shaped like a pod, that moves with a breeze in the trees. A rope bridge connects it to the canopoy walk. A covered shelter overlooks a pond, while another section has a glass floor for viewing the forest below. At the junction of two sections is a large cargo net for climbing and lounging.

- The Forest Classroom is a facility for hosting workshops, seminars and programs.
- Two steel pedestrian bridges allow guests to cross Snake Creek.
- ~~A 13,600 sq ft (1,260 m^{2}) playground has a sandy beach, flowing water, and play structures scaled for children~~
- Visitor Center
- a restored and repurposed midcentury residence by architect Alden B. Dow
- an amphitheater for performances

Whiting Forest opened in October 2018 and Dow Gardens attendance rose 300% annually.

In 2019, the Whiting Forest Canopy Walk was recognized by Associated Builders and Contractors as one of the most significant construction projects completed nationally that year. Whiting Forest received a Pyramid Award, which is ABC's second-highest honor.

The Playground was permanently closed in August 2024. The area was originally low-lying with a high-water table. Buried support timbers were rotting, and safety was an issue. The area was restored to a natural state. At the same time, the Whiting Forest Café closed temporarily, but mobile carts were stationed at key locations to provide refreshments.

== Events ==
- Watch the leaves change color in October and November
- Conservatory provides year-round viewing of plants and flowers
- Butterflies in Bloom occurs every March and April for a few brief weeks
- facilities for private meetings, workshops and programs
- Spring and summer events:
  - yoga in the garden
  - picnics
  - weddings are very popular at Dow Gardens with multiple events most weekends
  - lunchtime concerts
  - children's gardening program
  - tree climbing for adults & children
  - art & sculpture displays

== Operation ==
Dow Gardens employs about 35 individuals including horticulturalists, landscape technicians, arborists, managers and program directors. Many of their duties involve working with volunteers, who are critical to the success of the gardens. Volunteers play a role both behind the scenes planting flowers, weeding, picking up dead limbs; and as part of programs, working in children's activities, answering guest's questions at events, assisting coordinators. There are opportunities for individuals and groups.

The gardens have several internship programs, including history, plant records and horticulture. Participants receive hands-on experience and work on real life projects.

The Herbert H. and Grace A. Dow Foundation board of directors serve without compensation. For the tax year 2023, 25 Dow Gardens employees earned above $50,000 per year. Dow Gardens earned approximately $1.48 million from income producing activities but spent several times that in expenses.

== Recent accolades ==
- 2017-AAS Landscape Design Challenge Winner
- 2018-TripAdvisor Certificate of Excellence
- 2018-Keep Michigan Beautiful President's Award
- 2019-Midland Business Alliance Heritage Award
- 2019-Bette R. Tollar Civic Commitment Award
- 2019-AIA Tri-State Architectural Excellence in Design Bronze Award
- 2019-Society of American Registered Architects (SARA) Award of Merit
- 2020 National Excellence in Construction Pyramid Award
- 2020 TripAdvisor Traveler's Choice Award
- 2020 American Architecture Award
- 2020 AAF Addy Award

== See also ==
- List of botanical gardens and arboretums in Michigan
- List of botanical gardens in the United States
- List of parks in Midland County, Michigan
