= IKW =

IKW or ikw may refer to:

- IKW, the FAA LID code for Jack Barstow Municipal Airport, Michigan, United States
- ikw, the ISO 639-3 code for Ikwerre language, Rivers State, Nigeria
