= Dahlia Hill =

Protected garden in Michigan, United States

Dahlia Hill Society of Midland
- Dahlia Hill Society logo
- Founded: January 1, 1998; 28 years ago
- Founder: Charles Breed, Bill Fisher
- Type: Educational 501(c)(3)
- Tax ID no.: 38-3417612
- Location: 2809 Orchard Drive, Midland, Michigan
- Coordinates: 43.6243°N 84.2574°W
- Region served: Tri-Cities (Michigan)
- Key people: Peggy Kernstock, Executive Director
- Endowment: $80,000+
- Employees: 1
- Volunteers: 70
- Website: www.dahliahill.org
- Location within Michigan Location within the United States
- Interactive map showing the location of Dahlia Hill
- Location: Midland County, Michigan, USA
- Area: 1.41 acres (0.57 ha)
- Established: June 1992; 34 years ago
- Visitors: 5,000 (in 2012)
- Governing body: Dahlia Hill Society of Midland

Dahlia Hill (DH) is both a protected garden area in the Lower Peninsula of Michigan, encompassing 1.41 acres (0.57 ha) of terraced gardens, and the a 501(c)(3) non-profit educational organization that runs the garden. Located in the city of Midland, Michigan, they annually grow more than 3,000 dahlia plants.

== History ==
Artist and teacher Charles Breed and his wife Ester moved to Midland in 1950 because of Alden B. Dow's architecture. A gift of dahlia tubers to Ester from daughter Crisann on mother's day in 1966 began Charles Breed's fascination with dahlias. Twenty-five growing seasons later, Charles possessed 1,700 tubers. His design studio was located on West Main Street, next to a vacant lot on the corner of Main and Orchard Drive. Bill Fisher purchased that unimproved parcel in 1968, intending to build condominiums there. Breed declined to sell his property several times, recalling that Alden Dow had told him that the only hill in Midland should have a special purpose.

In 1992, Breed was given permission from Bill Fisher to plant dahlias on the vacant hillside property. Fisher Contracting brought in 200 cubic yards of topsoil, and Charles began planting his tubers, establishing Dahlia Hill.

Breed constructed a new design studio and gallery on his adjoining property in 1997, which included a work room and storage space for dahlias. Fisher put in an irrigation system and expanded the planting area.

The Dahlia Hill Society of Midland was incorporated in 1998 and began fund-raising to acquire the land where the flower garden was located. Midland lawyer John Riecker donated his time over a two-year period to form the non-profit entity, and his wife Ranny wrote a check to cover the $20,000 shortfall when the property was purchased from Fisher Contracting in August, 2000 for $175,000.

A volunteer board of directors was elected in 2002, and they hired an administrative director. Heavy rains caused erosion problems in the mid-2000s, so a new fund-raising campaign was started in 2006 to pay for improvements. Stone slabs were ordered from an Escanaba quarry and eight stone terraces were constructed in 2007 at a cost of $290,000. The tiered garden was dedicated in 2008, along with four cast aluminum sculptures representing the four seasons/cycles of life, a gift from Charles Breed. Three stone stairways ascend the hill, with two large raised planters at the top. One is a memorial circle where cremated remains can be mixed with soil to become dahlias. The other is a donor circle containing the names of contributors on plaques for the founders, various improvement projects, and the endowment.

According to Breed, Dahlia Hill is dedicated to Alden B. Dow because his talent, generosity and philosophy helped make the city of Midland unique.

== Today ==
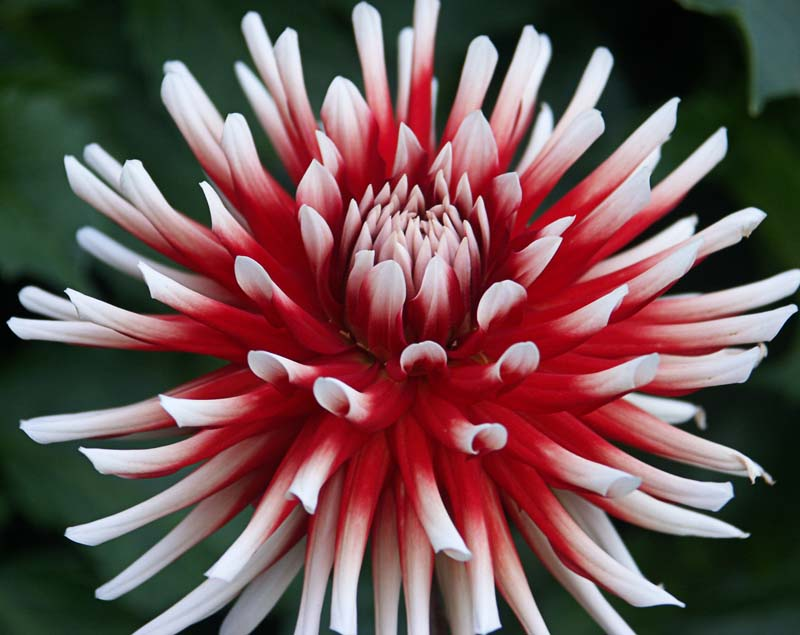
A small-flowered "cactus dahlia".

The garden presently is planted the third week each May and includes more than 250 varieties within the 3,000 dahlias planted. The American Dahlia Society recognizes 19 petal configurations of dahlias, and all are represented in the garden.
There is no monetary fee associated with membership in the society, but each member must commit to work at least 15 hours at the garden and attend biannual meetings. Inexperienced members may request a mentor to assist in row maintenance. Members receive ten tubers in the spring, and may pick a limited number of stems during peak blooming times. The dahlias are watered automatically, but members work on each row to remove weeds, stake and prune deadheads. The original 3,000 tubers planted in May generate nearly 10,000 in the Fall.

During peak blooming the public is invited for an open house to admire the flowers with refreshments of cider and doughnuts. Two weeks after the first frost, usually in late September, the tubers are uprooted, washed, divided, labelled and placed in climate controlled (45°) storage until the spring.

== Attributes ==
In contrast to most other flower societies, Dahlia Hill does not grow for competition or flower shows. Their goal is to educate people about dahlias, and show dahlias in a garden setting. There is no admission for visitors and no annual dues for members, so the society relies on donations and fundraising events to cover expenses. Dahlia tubers multiply during the growing season, so surplus tubers are sold in late May after planting is complete, typically for $2 each. Businesses or individuals may sponsor a dahlia row in honor or memory of friends, family or events. A Memorial Circle atop the hill is reserved for the cremated remains of loved ones, along with a memorial plaque. The society also maintains a "Book of Memory" that contains a life history of those memorialized.

== Endowment ==
To guarantee the future of the society, donors are encouraged to remember the society's endowment fund in their estate planning. The Midland Area Community Foundation maintains the Dahlia Hill Society Endowment Fund #244. In 2011, Charles Breed put his vacation home on Long Lake near Traverse City, Michigan into a charitable remainder trust. It was sold the following year and, upon his and his wife's deaths, the trust will go to Dahlia Hill to help secure the future of the organization's free admission policy.

== Recognition ==
Dahlia Hill has received two City of Midland beautification awards and the Keep Michigan Beautiful organization honored Dahlia Hill with the President's Plaque in 2010. The PBS television show, “Destination Michigan” recommended Dahlia Hill to its viewers, as did the Detroit Free Press. “The American Gardener” magazine included a six-page article about Dahlia Hill in their July/August 2012 issue. In 2013, the organization and its founder, Charles Breed, were recognized with a President's Award from the American Dahlia Society.

== See also ==
- List of parks in Midland County, Michigan
- List of botanical gardens and arboretums in Michigan
