= Herbert Henry Dow II =

American foundation executive (1927–1996)

- Born: August 6, 1927; Midland, Michigan, US
- Died: January 26, 1996 (aged 69); Houston, Texas, US
- Education: Massachusetts Institute of Technology BS, 1952
- Known for: corporate & foundation executive
- Spouse: Barbara Ellen Clarke (m. 1951)
- Children: 2
- Parents: Willard Dow (father); Martha Leonora Major (mother)
- Scientific career
- Fields: management
- Workplaces: Dow Chemical Company

Herbert Henry Dow II (January 6, 1927 – March 31, 1996) was an American foundation executive who led his family's charitable institution, Herbert H. and Grace A. Dow Foundation from 1970 to 1996. He also worked for 40 years at his family's business, the American multinational conglomerate Dow Chemical, founded by his grandfather, Herbert Henry Dow. A graduate of the Massachusetts Institute of Technology, he was a Dow vice president for 6 years and the corporate secretary for 18 years.

== Early years ==
Herbert Henry Dow II was born in 1927 in Midland, Michigan. He was the younger of two children of Willard Dow, second president of Dow Chemical, and his wife, Martha Lenora Major, a teacher from Bay County. Herbert completed elementary school in the Midland Public Schools before boarding at the Hotchkiss School in Lakeville, Connecticut. He graduated in 1945, then served in the United States Navy at the end of World War II. After his discharge, he briefly attended Yale University before enrolling at the Massachusetts Institute of Technology.

=== Parent's death ===
On March 31, 1949, Herbert's parents, Willard Dow and his wife Martha took off from Tri-City Airport in a twin-engine Beechcraft owned by Dow Chemical. They were flying to Boston to attend the Mid-Century Chemical Engineering Exposition, hosted by the Massachusetts Institute of Technology. Winston Churchill was scheduled to speak there, and Willard Dow had always wanted to meet him. Herbert II was a student at MIT, so the trip was an opportunity for he and his wife to see their son. An hour after takeoff the airplane was nearing London, Ontario when they experienced freezing rain and the wings began to accumulate ice. The loss of lift caused the plane to crash and both of Herbert's parents were killed.

=== Marriage ===
While at school, Herbert II met Barbara Clarke who was attending school at Wheelock College in Boston. The couple were married on September 16, 1951. After Herbert II graduated from MIT with a Bachelor of Science (SB) degree for general engineering, the couple moved to Midland, Michigan where he began work at Dow Chemical as a staff member in the Midland Division. Herbert II's uncle, Alden B. Dow began to design a home for his nephew's family in late 1952. The house was constructed and occupied the following year. The couple had three children.

== Business ==
As a Dow family member, he was named to Dow Chemical's board of directors in 1953. He was promoted to fabric products manager in 1954. With ten years of experience, he was named secretary to the decision-making Executive Committee from 1964 to 1987, Dow Corporate Secretary in 1968 until 1986, then promoted to Vice President from 1986 to 1992.

Ted Doan and Carl Gerstacker believed that competent younger employees should be placed in senior positions because they have the new ideas and energy to advance the company. They established a policy that Dow presidents, CEOs and board chairpersons must relinquish their post at age 60 and retire from the company at 65. The five-year period became known as "deceleration". When Herbert II turned 65 in 1992, he retired from Dow but not the foundation.

Herbert II died unexpectedly in a Houston, Texas hospital after heart surgery on January 26, 1996. He was 69 years old and had been retired for four years.

== Civic involvement ==
- Herbert II was named a trustee to the Herbert H. and Grace A. Dow Foundation in 1949. After 21 years, he became foundation president in 1970, a position he held until his death in 1996.
- He served the Council of Michigan Foundations as a trustee.
- Herbert II was very active in MIT activities since 1969, appointed to the MIT Corporation (their board of trustees) in 1983 and named a Life Member in 1993.
- The Herbert H. Dow II Program in American Journalism at Hillsdale College seeks to restore ethical journalism standards.

=== New foundation ===
In 1957 Herbert II and his wife Barbara established the Herbert H. and Barbara C. Dow Foundation for "the arts, higher education, health care and Christian ministries and organizations" in Frankfort, Michigan. In calendar year 2023 the organization had charitable disbursements of nearly $1.3 million; income of over $1.6 million and assets exceeding $27 million.

== Awards ==
- Doctor of Laws, Central Michigan University, 1972
- Doctor of Humanities (honorary), Saginaw Valley State College, 1975
- Doctor of Public Service (honorary), Albion College, 1977
- Life Member, MIT Corporation, 1993.
