= Midland County Courthouse =

County government courthouse in Michigan

- U.S. National Register of Historic Places
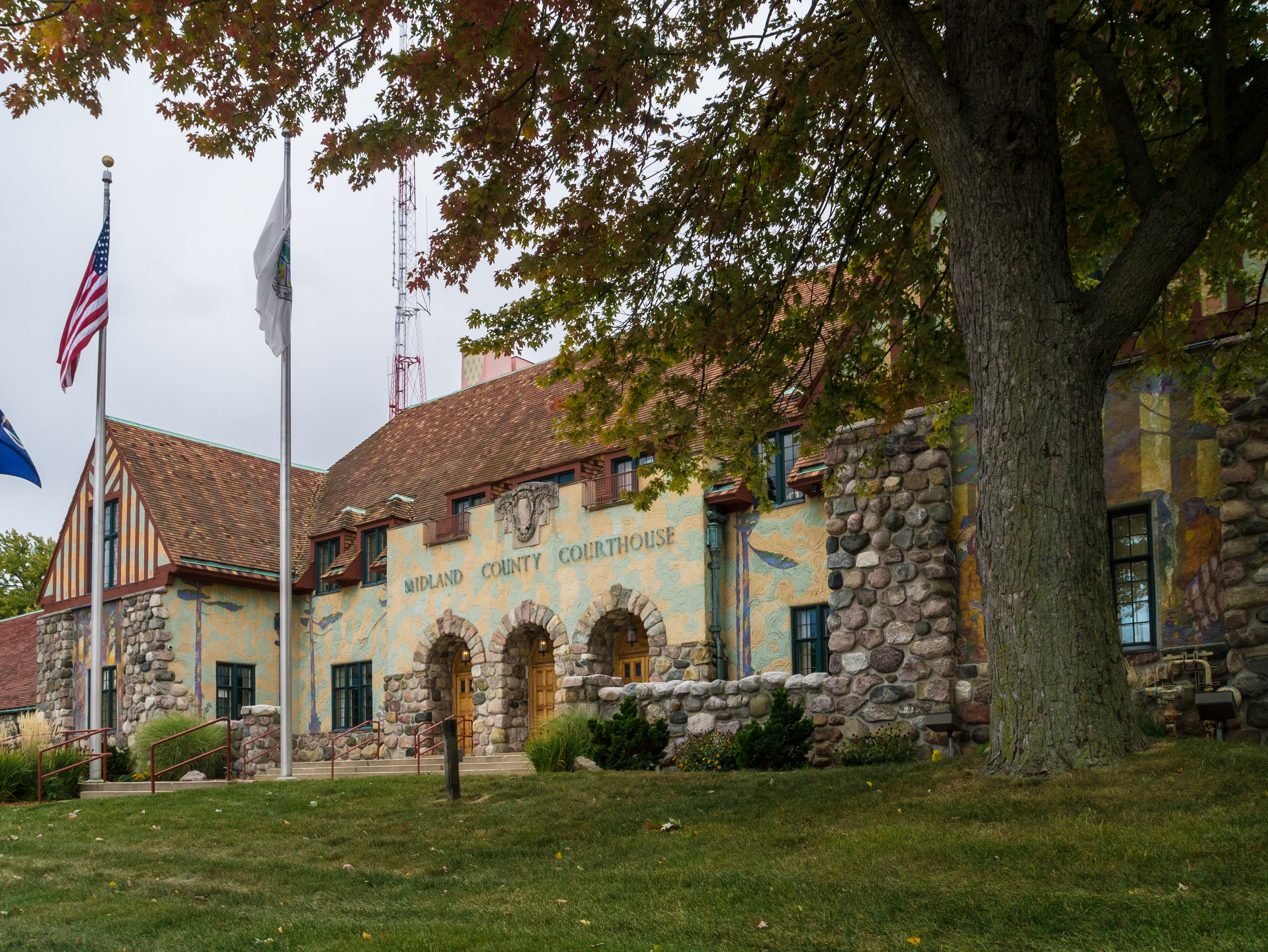
- Main Street courthouse entrance

- Location within Michigan Location within the United States
- Interactive map showing the location of Midland County Courthouse
- Location: 301 W. Main St., Midland, Michigan
- Coordinates: 43°36′50″N 84°14′50″W
- Area: 3 acres (1.2 ha)
- Built: 1924 to 1925
- Built by: Spence Brothers
- Architects: Bloodgood Tuttle, et al.
- Architectural style: Tudor Revival
- NRHP reference No.: 86000381
- Added to NRHP: March 13, 1986

The Midland County Courthouse is a government building located at 301 West Main Street in Midland, Michigan. It was listed on the National Register of Historic Places in 1986. It is the only Tudor Revival style courthouse in the state and has been in use for 100 years.

== History ==
=== Settlement ===
Henry Ashmun rode his horse to the state capital in Lansing for permission from the state legislature to construct a courthouse in Midland City, home to 15 households in the county seat of Midland County. The legislature agreed to allow the board of supervisors and prosecuting attorney to select the new courthouse site. It appeared that nobody in the legislature bothered to determine who the prosecutor was or members of the board. If they had, they would have discovered Henry Ashmun in both positions. The property chosen may have been donated by Dr. Fitzhugh or owned by Ashmun. The tract was centrally located and to mark the location, stakes were driven into the ground on October 13, 1856. To celebrate, Timothy Jerome and Dan Davis came from Saginaw by boat to meet a group of Midlanders. They shared a bottle of champaign brought by Jerome, who designed the courthouse. Construction began the following year and was completed and occupied in 1858. The wood-framed structure utilized the Greco-Roman architectural style and cost $6,000.

=== Replacement ===
Discussions regarding a new courthouse began prior to 1920 because the current structure was "old-fashioned" and citizens wanted something more impressive. When Dr. Herbert Dow of the local Dow Chemical Company supported a new building, the decision was settled. Architect Bloodgood Tuttle from Detroit and Cleveland had designed a house for his son, Willard, so Dow engaged Tuttle for the design. Legal issues delayed the funding, but by 1924, only $180,000 of $220,000 had been raised. Dow made a proposal: he would pay for any costs over $180,000 if he was given authority to use Dow products and materials in the building.

Saginaw's Spence Brothers were awarded a construction contract at the end of 1924 and construction commenced beside the existing courthouse. Paul Honore, a mural artist from Detroit was hired to create artwork on the exterior. Parts of the courthouse exterior are magnesite stucco (magnesium oxychloride), a product developed at Dow Chemical. A Dow employee worked with the artist to create the material. Normal stucco uses silex and sand; ground glass was substituted for sparkle and better color. The artist used a palette knife to create the murals that told Midland County's history with life-sized, 3-D figures. The 1858 Greco-Roman courthouse was razed in 1929 by Hiram Crane who used the salvaged lumber to construct three homes.

=== Additions ===
Just thirty years later, activities at the courthouse required more space. Midland architect Alden B. Dow son of Herbert Dow designed an addition in the shape of a cross to include the sheriff's living quarters, jail cells to accommodate 52 prisoners, and space for offices. Seven men were named to the building committee, and the Collinson Construction Company was selected for the expansion. Fieldstone from local farmer's fields was selected to resemble the look of the 1926 building. It was dedicated June 7, 1958.

In 1979, a rear addition was constructed, designed by Robert E. Schwartz & Associates, Architect, also of Midland. Two of the original windows were required to be closed and the public entry in the circuit courtroom required relocation at the rear during the 1979 addition. The open stairway in the central lobby was removed and replaced with an enclosed stairway in the front vestibule. Due to the slope of the land, a fourth level was created, opening at ground level in the back.

In 2003, the front entrance on Main Street was closed for security to limit potential weapons in the courthouse.

=== Jail ===
When the new jail was completed on October 8, 2009, hundreds of people showed up to see the $25 million, 103,000 square feet (9,600 m^{2}) facility. It replaced an outdated courthouse addition constructed in the 1950s with 90 beds. Inmates were transferred to the new facility from late December through early January 2010. The demolition of the courthouse wing began in September 2013 as the start of a courthouse renovation.

=== Renovation ===
The same company that built the original building, Spence Brothers, was chosen to perform the addition and renovation of the courthouse. A 20,000 square feet (1,900 m^{2}) addition replaced the jail wing that had been demolished and 25,000 square feet (2,300 m^{2}) of the building was updated. The courthouse renovation from 2016 to 2017 restored Main Street access for the public and modernized the interior to improve safety and functionality for the staff and public. The renos included new elevators, electrical, plumbing, locked courtroom entrances, special judicial access to the clerk of courts, glass partitions to separate the public from court clerks and a new hallway built for movement of inmates from courtrooms to and from the sally port. The original project cost was $7.8 million with a $660K cost overrun for HVAC and fire suppression. Funding was provided by the Herbert H. and Grace A. Dow Foundation, the Rollin M. Gerstacker Foundation, the Charles J. Strosacker Foundation and the Dow Chemical Company Foundation who partnered with Midland County. Grants were also provided by the Michigan Baseball Foundation, Dow Chemical Company and the Alden and Vada Dow Family Foundation.

== Courthouse ==
=== Description ===
The Midland County Courthouse is a three-story Tudor Revival style courthouse, measuring approximately 117 feet in length and 56 to 90 feet in depth. It is sited on a grade, so that only two stories appear on the front elevation. The main section of the roof is hipped, with two gable ends projecting; orange, red and tan clay tiles cover the roof. Fieldstone is used as the base of the building up to the windowsills. Above are stucco walls, with the second floor tusked under the eaves of the roof. Half-timbered gable ends, and dormers contain windows to the second floor.

The original courthouse included 56 rooms, 16 closets and 7 vaults. The basement included offices for public works and the sheriff. The first-floor contained offices for the treasurer, clerk, register of deeds and probate courtroom. The second-floor featured circuit court rooms and judges' chambers and lawyers' work rooms. The top floor was the central lobby. There was actually a third floor under the roof peak that contained sleeping quarters and bathrooms for jurors of both sexes.

=== Artwork ===
Rear view of courthouse

A group of paintings were hung in the courthouse lobby in 1927, created by Biron Roger, an artist from Detroit. They illustrate the progression of history in Midland County. The first painting depicts a Chippewa brave walking into his village with a deer slung on his shoulders. The second shows a pioneer couple standing over a sleeping baby in a cradle. The third illustrates the county's 50-year lumber boom with a lumberjack felling a tree. The fourth pictures a woman planting seeds on a farm, and the fifth portrays Herbert Dow standing over Midland titled, "The Sower." A sixth painting was planned, named, "The Return of the Soldiers," but the county ran out of money and the artist's health declined. The sixth frame features the words, "The artist has depicted the past. Your deeds will determine the future."
