= List of botanical gardens and arboretums in Michigan =

This list of botanical gardens and arboretums in Michigan is intended to include all significant botanical gardens and arboretums in the U.S. state of Michigan

Name	Image	Affiliation	City
W. J. Beal Botanical Garden		Michigan State University	East Lansing
Dow Gardens			Midland
Fernwood Botanical Garden and Nature Preserve			Buchanan
Hidden Lake Gardens		Michigan State University	Franklin Township/Tipton
Leila Arboretum			Battle Creek
MacArthur Park Arboretum			Mount Clemens
Matthaei Botanical Gardens		University of Michigan	Ann Arbor
Frederik Meijer Gardens & Sculpture Park			Grand Rapids
Michigan State University Horticulture Gardens		Michigan State University	East Lansing
Nichols Arboretum		University of Michigan	Ann Arbor
Slayton Arboretum		Hillsdale College	Hillsdale
Belle Isle Conservatory		City of Detroit	Detroit
Wilderness Arboretum		Huron County Nature Center	Port Austin

== See also ==
- List of botanical gardens and arboretums in the United States
