= Herbert H. Dow House =

Historic house in Michigan, United States

- U.S. National Register of Historic Places
- U.S. National Historic Landmark
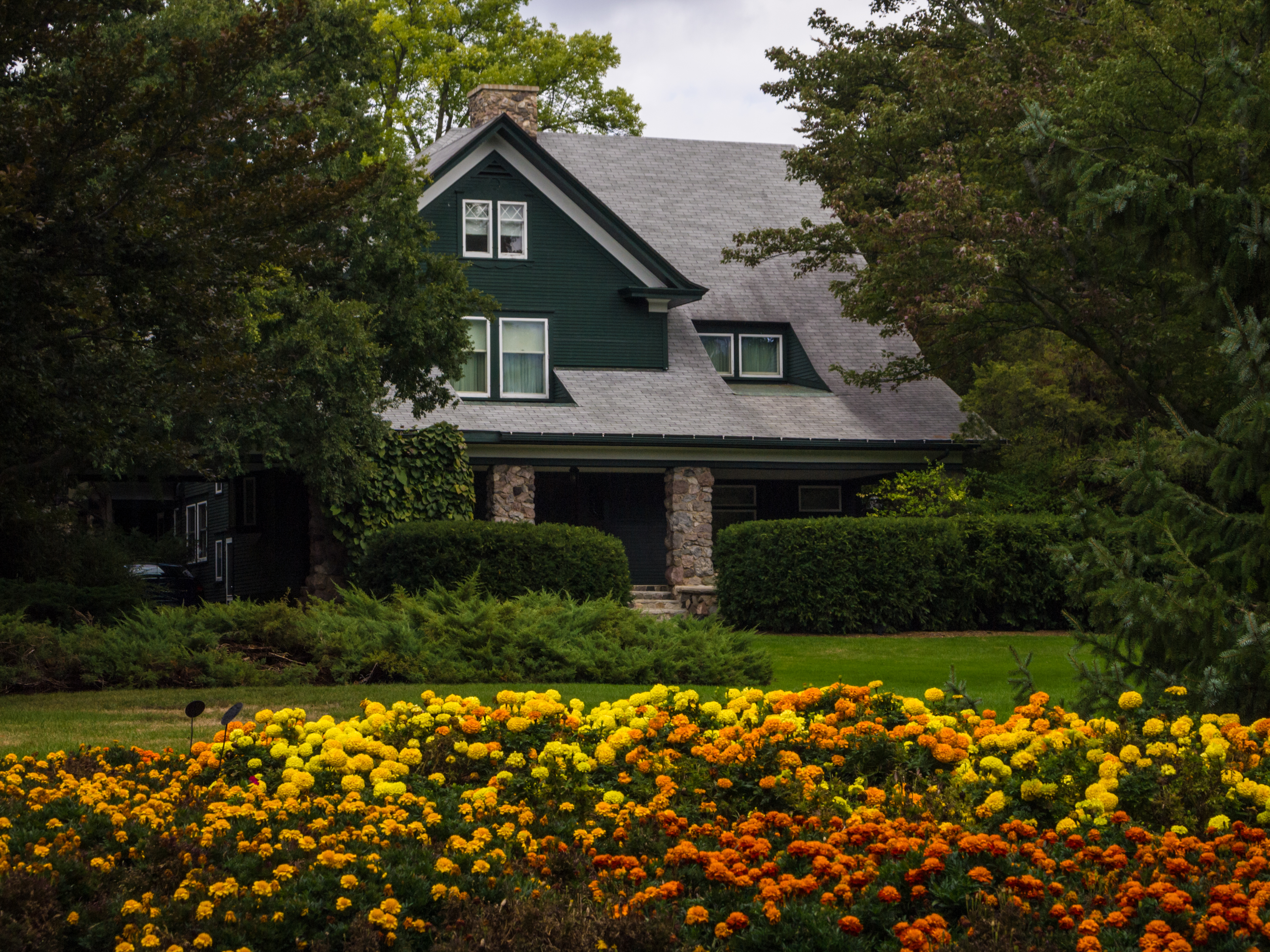

- Location within Michigan Location within the United States
- Interactive map
- Location: 1038 W. Main St., Midland, Michigan
- Coordinates: 43.6215°N 84.2534°W
- Built: 1899
- NRHP reference No.: 76001033

Significant dates
- Added to NRHP: May 11, 1976
- Designated NHL: May 11, 1976

The Herbert H. Dow House, locally known as The Pines, is a historic home located in the Dow Gardens of Midland, Michigan. Built in 1899, Herbert Henry Dow (b. 1866) founded the Dow Chemical Company in 1897. The house was declared a National Historic Landmark in 1976. The house is open for limited guided tours; admission is charged, but it is not ADA-accessible.

== History ==
The same year that Dow founded the Dow Chemical Company, he purchased land for his family's home. He engaged Clark and Munger, Bay City architects, to develop a design and plans. Construction began after the snow melted in 1899 and was completed before Thanksgiving that year. Known by the family as The Pines, it was the home of Herbert and Grace Dow and their seven children for over fifty years. Although the family could afford it, they never purchased another house; the Pines was the family's sanctuary. H.H. Dow died in 1930 but his wife Grace remained in the house until her death in 1953. She bequeathed her house, gardens and Dow stock to the Herbert H. and Grace A. Dow Foundation which she established following her husband's death. Upon the death of Grace Dow, the house was closed and left unchanged for two decades. The home contains many items utilized by Dow family members; trained docents share stories to make these artifacts come to life. Visitors can see the books read by the children of Herbert and Grace and clothing worn by Mrs. Dow.

== Description ==
The house is an architecturally vernacular 2½-story wood-frame structure, with a diversity of projections, roof styles, and window sizes and shapes. It is not considered to be architecturally significant, but rather architecturally eclectic. The most prominent feature is its irregular shape with extensions and bays, groups of windows and almost no ornamentation on the exterior. The design has a typical center hall and quarters for servants in the back of the house. There is a two-story study and recreation room with an entrance attached diagonally at a corner.

Dow was also interested in horticulture, developing extensive orchards and gardens near his home. That land is now the Dow Gardens, a private park open to the public. The Herbert H. Dow House is also within Dow Gardens.

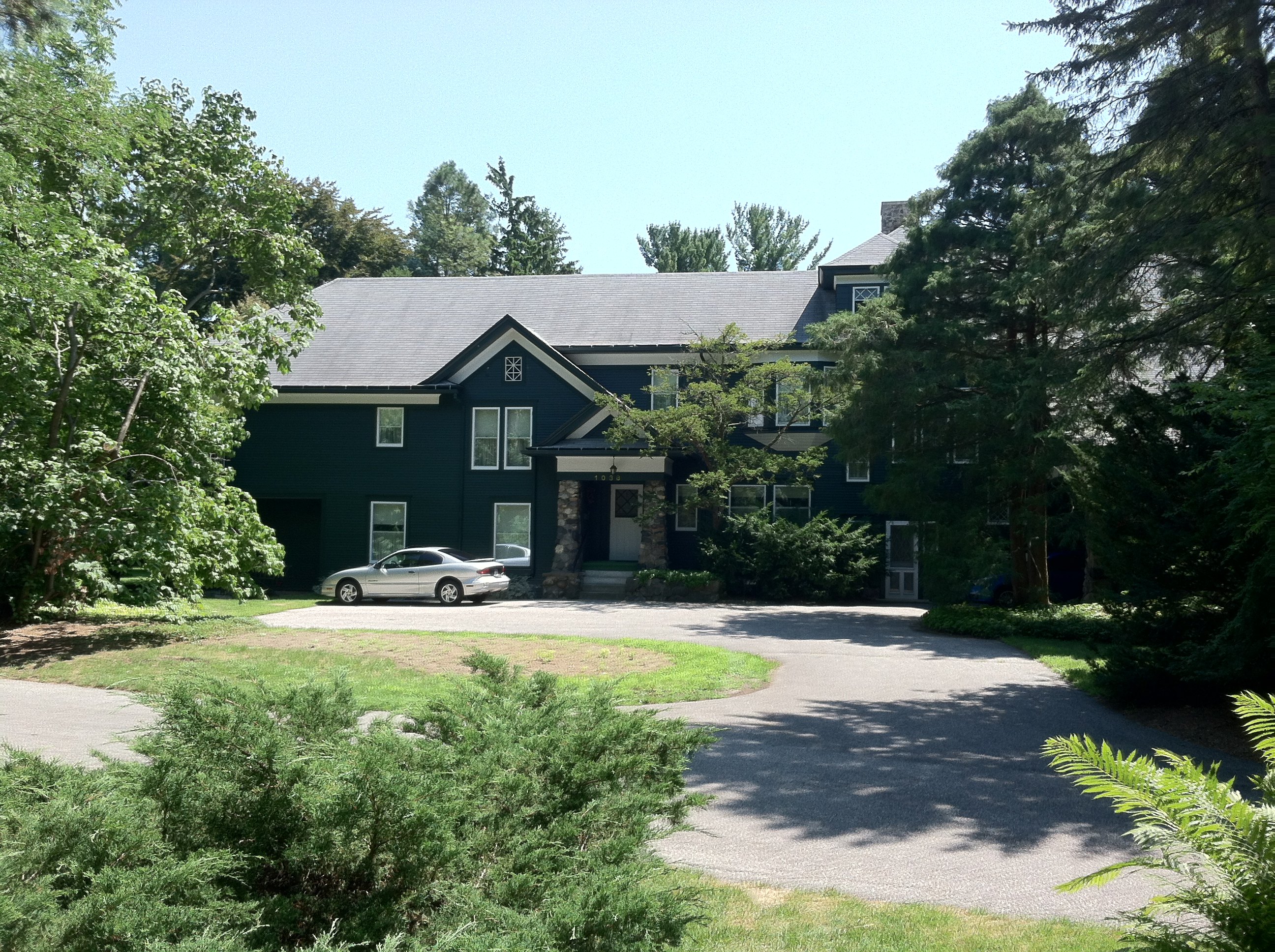
Back side of Dow home.

== See also ==
- List of National Historic Landmarks in Michigan
- National Register of Historic Places listings in Midland County, Michigan
- Herbert Henry Dow
- Dow Chemical Company
- Dow Gardens
- Herbert H. and Grace A. Dow Foundation
- Herbert Henry Dow High School
