= Dow process (bromine) =

Method of bromine extraction from brine

The Dow process is the method of bromine extraction from brine, and was Herbert Henry Dow's second revolutionary process for generating bromine commercially.

This process was patented in 1891. In the original invention, bromide-containing brines are treated with sulfuric acid and bleaching powder to oxidize bromide to bromine, which remains dissolved in the water. Other oxidizers, such as electric current or chlorine, may be used instead of bleach. The aqueous solution is dripped onto burlap, and air is blown through causing bromine to volatilize. Bromine is trapped with iron turnings to give a solution of ferric bromide. Treatment with more iron metal converted the ferric bromide to ferrous bromide via comproportionation. Where desired, free bromine may be obtained by thermal decomposition of ferrous bromide.

Before Dow entered the bromine business, brine was evaporated by heating with wood scraps and then crystallized sodium chloride was removed. An oxidizing agent was added, and bromine was formed in the solution. Then bromine was distilled. This was a very complicated and costly process.
