= Grace A. Dow Memorial Library =

Public library in Michigan

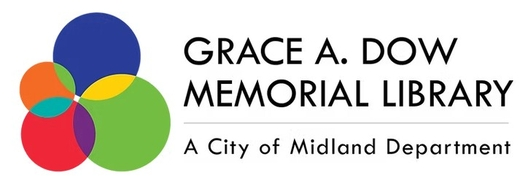
- 43.6258°N 84.2481°W
- Location: Midland, Michigan
- Established: 1899, 1953

Collection
- Size: 262,065 (2010)

Access and use
- Circulation: 860,380 (2010)
- Population served: 75,215 (2010)

Other information
- Budget: $3.8 million
- Director: Miriam Andrus (2018-)
- Employees: 51
- Website: https://www.gadml.org]

The Grace A. Dow Memorial Library (GADML) is a public library in the City of Midland, Michigan. In addition to city residents, it is available to residents of Midland County townships that contract for services.

== History ==
The Midland Library Association originated in 1899 as a subscription library. A total of 25 charter members paid $1/year entitling them to check out one book each week. The first librarian was Mary Dow, sister of Herbert Henry Dow. In 1900, the Library Association opened their subscription library with 200 books in a room at the Unitarian Church. In May, 1900, a Free Reading Room was established with the support of local manufacturers and businesses. In 1915, the Library Association transferred control of the Midland Library and Free Reading Room to the Midland Board of Education. The city contributed $350 for expenses. In 1919, the Carnegie Library opened next to the Community Center on Townsend Street. That year, the library moved to the Carnegie library. A children's section was established in the basement in 1935.

The Library Board was dissolved in 1951 and the City of Midland established a Library Advisory Board. All Library employees became employees of the City of Midland.

A new library was opened on Monday, January 24, 1955, at the corner of West St. Andrews Street and Eastman Avenue. It was named the "Grace A. Dow Memorial Library" after architect Alden B. Dow's mother. Grace A. Dow, wife of Herbert Henry Dow (founder of the Dow Chemical Company), was instrumental in the construction of the new library. After her death in 1953, before construction began, the library was named in her memory.

The Midland library celebrated its 100th anniversary during National Library Week in 2000. They celebrated 50 years in the Grace A. Dow Memorial building in 2005.

On October 21, 2012, library director Melissa Barnard announced a $3 million grant from the Herbert H. and Grace A. Dow Foundation to pay for infrastructure improvements and interior remodeling. Including this gift, the foundation has given $9.1 million to the library since 1938. Renovation work took place from the end of 2013 through the beginning of 2014 and included carpet and furniture replacement, HVAC replacement, wood refinishing on the Mezzanine, and the change to RFID tagging in library materials. The renovations changed the interior of the library to better align with Alden B. Dow's vision for the building.

== Recently ==
As a result of the Sanford Lake Dam failure in May 2020, the basement level of the library was flooded. The COVID-19 pandemic in the United States required operational changes while that large cleanup was taking place. In November, 2025 the library partially reopened with limited services while extensive renovations were underway.

The week following Valentine's Day, library staff prepared for the reopening by assembling new furniture, replacing carpeting, installing acoustic panels, cleaning, painting and reassembling the playground structure. On Monday February 23, 2026 the entire library facility reopened featuring a space for "Tweens", better pods for studying and reading, and an expanded MidLab. Landscaping updates are targeted for May 2026 that will include a book return from vehicles.

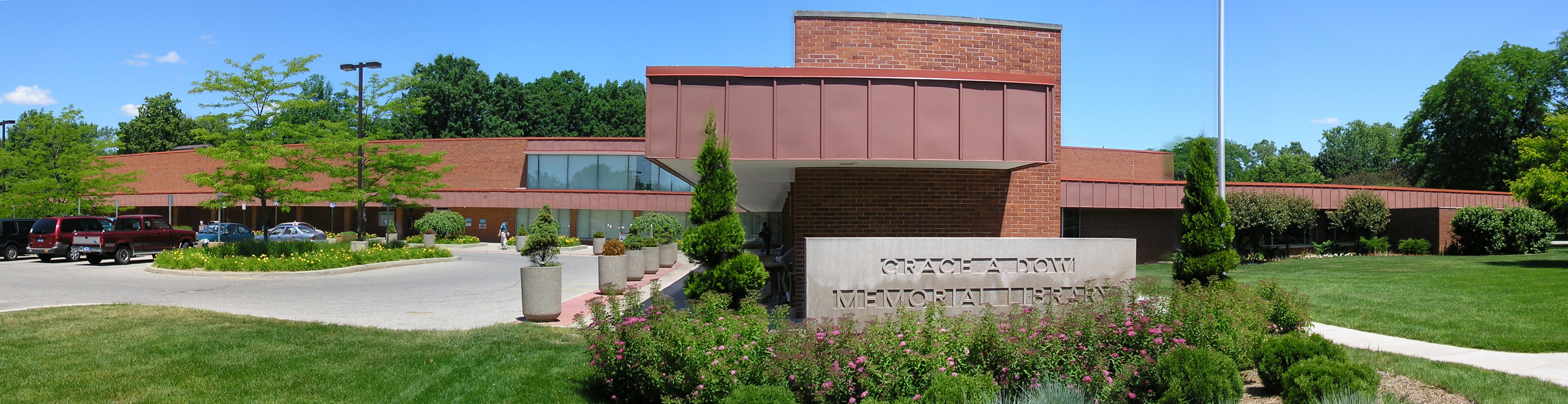
Grace A. Dow Memorial Library in Midland (click to enlarge)

== Services ==
The library facilitates access through print and non-print sources. The library provides internet access free of charge to all visitors (time limits are in place), through dedicated computers, rental laptops, a building-wide wireless network, and netbooks for youth. Cardholders can surf the library's website to access specialized databases, downloadable e-audio books, eBooks, and more. Members can renew items, place holds, search databases, download eBooks and audio books.

Educational & enrichment programming for adults includes computer classes, speakers on many topics, a library-sponsored book discussion group, Battle of the Books for adults, community reads, and a Summer Reading Program. In addition, volunteers are available weekday afternoons to help with in-depth genealogy research.

Programming for children includes storytimes, the Beyond Books literacy center, the Discovery Depot play area, a Summer Reading Program, Battle of the Books for fourth and fifth graders, and other book discussions and activities.

The library opened the "Teen Spot" in 2005. It offered a teen room, book-related programs, a volunteer program, and a Summer Reading Program.

The library building has meeting rooms, a community room, and auditorium available for rent, a quiet reading room and individual study areas, gathering spaces for small groups, and a gallery that can be rented for exhibitions.

The Cup and Chaucer coffee shop, a partnership with the Arnold Center, opened in 2004, but closed in 2016.

Following cleanup after the 2020 flood, basement offices were renovated to create a "maker space" that was named, MidLab. The DIY area is for members at least 12 years old to have access to expensive equipment including Cricut cutting plotters and presses, laser printer/engraver, Glowforge laser cutters, 3D printers, sublimation printers, sewing and embroidery machines. Small classes are presented by library staff and other qualified individuals regarding use and operation of the machines. Some equipment requires library staff supervision.

== Collections ==
Library collections include print and downloadable books for all ages; CD, mp3, and downloadable audiobooks for all ages; theatrical movies, foreign films, documentaries, and educational DVDs. Special collections include graphic novels for children, teens, and adults; large print books; and a local history and genealogy collection.

== About the library ==
The Friends of the Grace A. Dow Memorial Library group raises money for the library through book sales. The group's fundraising efforts support not only such programming as Battle of the Books and the Summer Reading Program, but also physical updates to the building such as the recent renovation of the Library Auditorium. Some members of the Friends of the Library were commended in 2013 for having volunteered with the group since its inception 40 years before.

The building is also home to the studios and offices of Midland Community Television, the Public, educational, and government access (PEG) cable TV channel for Midland, which cablecasts four channels on the local Charter cable system, AT&T U-Verse cable system, and streams via MCTV's website, a mobile app, and the MCTV Network Community Voices app on Roku, Apple TV, and Amazon Fire devices.

The library features a large children's section and a Teen Spot, a place specially for 6th through 12th graders, and includes many young adult books, computers, comfortable seating and an island table.

The library also rents laptops out for use within the building and has free Wi-Fi.

== Honors and awards ==
The library received the Michigan State Librarian's Excellence Award for exemplary public service in 2005. The honor, which includes a $5,000 grant and a trophy, is awarded to a single library in the state each year.

Patrons from the library were able to win a nationwide contest in early 2011: "I Love My Library". Their entries included an explanation as to why their library deserved to win the award.
