= Willard Dow =

American chemical industrialist (1897–1949)

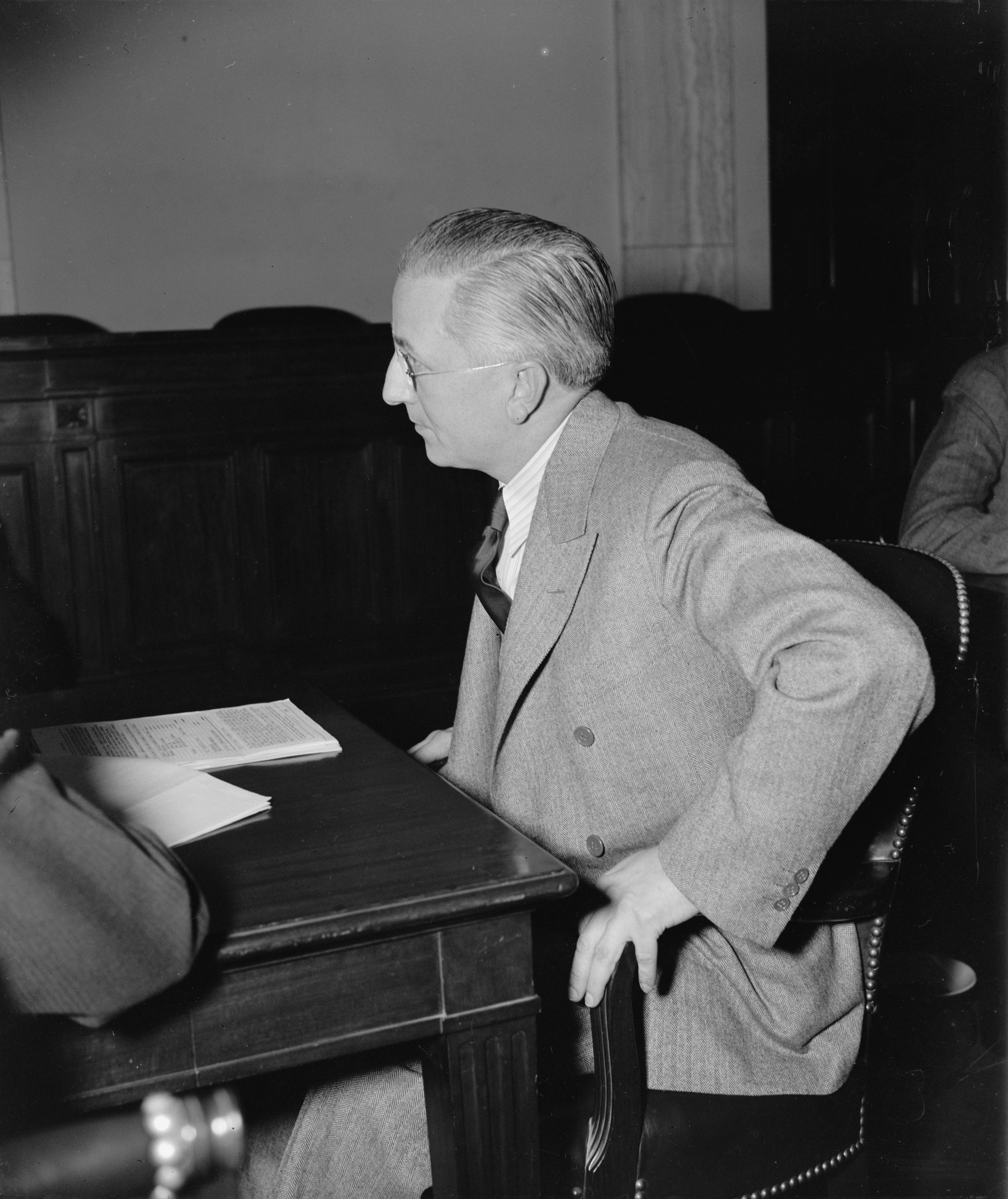
- Dow in 1938
- Born: Willard Henry Dow; January 4, 1897; Midland, Michigan, United States
- Died: March 31, 1949 (aged 52) near London, Ontario, Canada
- Education: University of Michigan
- Known for: expanding Dow Chemical Company; essential products for WW2
- Spouse: Martha Pratt (m. 1921)
- Children: 2
- Parents: Herbert Henry Dow (father); Grace Anna Ball (mother)
- Awards: Chemical Industry Medal (1946); American Institute of Chemists Gold Medal (1944); Plastics Hall of Fame (1975)
- Scientific career
- Fields: Chemical engineering

Willard Henry Dow (January 4, 1897 – March 31, 1949) was an American chemical industrialist who expanded the American multinational conglomerate Dow Chemical, founded by his father, Herbert Henry Dow. A graduate of the University of Michigan in Ann Arbor, Michigan, he was a prolific inventor of chemical processes, compounds, products and production sites that helped the Allies prevail in World War II and prepare the country for growth following the war. An article in the Midland newspaper stated, "Willard was known around the world for his industrial know-how, his business acumen and brilliant scientific mind."

== Early years ==
Willard Henry Dow was born in 1897 in Midland, Michigan, the year his father started Dow Chemical. He was the third of seven children of Herbert Henry Dow, founder of Dow Chemical, and his wife, Grace Anna Ball, a teacher from Midland. Willard's younger brother, Osborn Curtis, died from Spinal meningitis before his third birthday in 1902. After graduating from Midland High School in 1914, he worked summers as a lab assistant at Dow and enrolled at the University of Michigan to study chemical engineering. Willard's sister Ruth married Leland Doan in 1917. Willard's oldest sister Helen married Dr. William Hale but died in the 1918 Spanish flu epidemic. Dow graduated with a Bachelor of Science degree in 1919 and began assisting his brother-in-law at Dow Chemical. Willard Dow married Martha Pratt on September 3, 1921 in a ceremony at the family gardens (now Dow Gardens) behind their family's home in Midland. The union bore two children: Helen (born in 1924) and Herbert Henry Dow II (born in 1927).

== Business ==
His father required Willard to work in every department at the Midland plant to expand his knowledge of the company. In 1922, Willard was named a company director and became general manager of the Dow plant in 1926. His father died October 15, 1930, from cirrhosis of the liver while receiving treatment at the Mayo Clinic in Minnesota. Willard was just 33, but he proved himself capable of successfully operating the company. Dow invested heavily in research and development during the Great Depression.

=== Magnesium ===
In just eight months from 1940 to 1941, Dow built its first plant in Freeport, Texas, to produce magnesium extracted from seawater rather than underground brine. Willard Dow considered the first magnesium plant as vindication for years of research and investment, a task his father began 16 years prior. For the first time, the ocean was being mined. Magnesium was required to manufacture lightweight parts for aircraft. In 1942, a critical year in gaining air supremacy over Europe, Dow-operated plants produced 84 percent of the nation’s magnesium output.

=== Styrene ===
When the second world war began, access to natural rubber was essentially terminated. Polybutadiene was the synthetic rubber selected for use by the federal government. The product is made from Butadiene and Styrene. Dow was the only styrene producer in the United States. In 1942, Dow agreed to provide the government with assistance to enable the U.S. to produce synthetic rubber during the war. Dow also operated several plants at the government's request to supply synthetic rubber to our armed forces. Dow began its foreign expansion with the formation of Dow Chemical of Canada in Sarnia, Ontario to produce styrene for use in synthetic rubber.

=== Plastics & foam ===
The military also needed numerous other materials that Dow produced. Dow’s first plastic, Ethocel, was used for control knobs, telephone headsets, mouthpieces, goggles, canteens, airplane parts and explosive devices. Foamed polystyrene was used in lifeboats and rafts for buoyancy. After the war, Dow marketed Styrofoam with great success. Newly developed Saran resins were used to screen insects in tropical jungles and did not rust or rot. Theys were also used to for shoe insoles in jungle boots to prevent fungal infections. Later, the plastic film would be modified for everyday products including Saran Wrap.

=== Dow Corning ===
In 1943, Corning Glass Works (now Corning Inc.) and Dow formed Dow Corning, established to explore silicone products for military use. Their first product was Dow Corning 4 Compound, an ignition-sealing compound that allowed airplanes to fly at high-altitudes. After the war, Dow Corning began producing products for civilian use and became the largest producer of silicone products in the world.

== Summary ==
Growth of these businesses made Dow a strategic company during World War II. The company's investment in petrochemicals, magnesium and plastics allowed Dow to contribute greatly to the war effort. At his death, Willard had grown company revenue 700% by seven-fold and their product base positioned them for future growth when the demand for chemicals exploded.

Willard operated the company with a family culture offering good wages, pension plans, model homes for employees, generous life and health insurance benefits and corporate support for cultural and community activities and facilities. Dow became a prime example of a large, progressive corporation.

Willard Dow believed that for a company to survive, they must respond to whatever challenges their era presents. He was convinced that chemistry provided boundless opportunities.

== Death ==
On March 31, 1949, Willard Dow, his wife Martha; Dow Counsel Calvin Campbell and his wife Alta; and veteran Dow Pilots Frederick Clement and Arthur Bowie took off from Freeland's Tri-City Airport in a twin-engine Beechcraft owned by Dow Chemical. They were flying to Boston to attend the Mid-Century Chemical Engineering Exposition, hosted by the Massachusetts Institute of Technology. Winston Churchill was scheduled to speak there, and Dow had always wanted to meet him. His son, Herbert II was a student at MIT, so the trip was an opportunity for he and his wife to see his son. An hour after takeoff the airplane was nearing London, Ontario when they experienced freezing rain and the wings began to accumulate ice. The defrosters were not working, so the pilots descended hoping for warmer air, but loss of lift caused the plane to crash. The aircraft burst into flames and Calvin Campbell was able to crawl through the cargo door. He attempted to rescue his wife, but intense heat and flames stopped him. Campbell reported that the Dows and the pilots were not moving. He suffered a back injury, leg lacerations and severe arm burns. After treatment, Campbell called the company in Midland to report the tragedy.

Telegrams, condolence cards, phone calls and tributes arrived at Dow Headquarters from around the world. Flower shops in the Saginaw, Midland, and Bay City metropolitan area of Michigan struggled to meet the fill orders for arrangements. On Sunday April 3, Willard and Martha Dow's caskets were placed in the rotunda of the Midland County Courthouse surrounded by flowers. From 10am to 5pm over 12,000 people paid their respects. The funeral service was private and held the following day at St. John's Episcopal Church in Midland. Many businesses in Midland closed, as did the Midland Public Schools. Dow facilities throughout the world shut down for the day.

On Tuesday, April 5, Dow's leaders agreed to return to business despite their grief. Leland Doan, married to Willard's sister Ruth, was chosen Dow president; Earl Bennett, father-in-law of Willard's brother Alden B. Dow became board chairman; general manager was Dr. Mark Putnam; Calvin Campbell was named secretary and Carl Gerstacker was selected as treasurer.

== Awards ==
- Doctor of Science degree, 1939 Michigan College of Mining and Technology
- Doctor of Engineering degree, 1941 University of Michigan
- Gold Medal, 1944 American Institute of Chemists
- Doctor of Engineering degree, 1944 Illinois Institute of Technology
- Chemical Industry Medal, 1946 Society of Chemical Industry
- 30-year Service Pin, 1949 Dow Chemical Company
- 32nd Degree Shriner (Master of the Royal Secret) Knights Templar (Freemasonry)
- Inducted Plastics Hall of Fame, 1975
