= Jack Barstow Municipal Airport =

Airport in Florida, U.S.

Jack Barstow Airport Jack Barstow Municipal Airport
- IATA: none; ICAO: KIKW; FAA LID: IKW

Summary
- Airport type: Public
- Owner: City of Midland
- Serves: Midland, Michigan
- Elevation AMSL: 635 ft (194 m)
- Coordinates: 43°39′46″N 084°15′41″W
- Website: midland-mi.org/...

Map
- Location of airport in Michigan IKW (the United States)

Runways
Direction	Length		Surface
Direction	ft	m	Surface
6/24	3,801	1,159	Asphalt
18/36	3,001	915	Asphalt

Statistics (2020)
- Aircraft operations: 16,000
- Based aircraft: 46
- Source: FAA, Michigan Airport Directory

Jack Barstow Airport (ICAO: KIKW, FAA LID: IKW, formerly 3BS), also known as Jack Barstow Municipal Airport, is a city-owned, public-use airport located three nautical miles (6 km) northwest of the central business district of Midland, a city in Midland County, Michigan, United States. It is included in the Federal Aviation Administration (FAA) National Plan of Integrated Airport Systems for 2017–2021, in which it is categorized as a local general aviation facility.

Although many U.S. airports use the same three-letter location identifier for the FAA and IATA, this facility is assigned IKW by the FAA but has no designation from the IATA.

A local chapter of the Experimental Aircraft Association (EAA) is located at Barstow Airport. Through the EAA's Young Eagles program, annual aviation camps are held at the airport to educate youth.

== History ==
The airport is named after local pilot John "Jack" Barstow, who lived in Midland and became adept at flying gliders in San Diego, California. On April 29, 1930, Barstow established an unofficial world record endurance for gliders by soaring a Bowlus sailplane at Point Loma near San Diego for over 15 hours. As an instructor at the Bowlus Glider School, Barstow helped train Charles and Anne Lindbergh in gliding in 1930. The former Midland Airport was renamed Jack Barstow Municipal Airport shortly following Barstow's death in 1935, at the age of 29.

== Facilities and aircraft ==
The airport covers an area of 512 acres (207 ha) at an elevation of 635 feet (194 m) above mean sea level. It has two asphalt paved runways: 6/24 is 3,801 by 75 feet (1,159 x 23 m) and 18/36 is 3,001 by 75 feet (915 x 23 m).

The aircraft has a fixed-base operator that sells avgas and offers amenities such as general maintenance, catering, courtesy transportation, rental cars, a conference room, a crew lounge, snooze rooms, and more.

For the 12-month period ending December 31, 2020, the airport had 16,000 aircraft operations, an average of 44 per day. They were all general aviation. At that time there were 46 aircraft based at this airport: 30 single-engine and 3 multi-engine airplanes, 2 helicopters, and 1 jet.

== Accidents and incidents ==
- On May 27, 2003, a Cessna 172 Skyhawk sustained substantial damage during a hard landing at the Jack Barstow Airport. The pilot reported that upon returning from the local flight he entered the pattern for runway 36 . The pilot stated that he was too high during the landing and the airplane bounced. He then applied power in an attempt to regain control of the aircraft, but the aircraft bounced a second time. The pilot reported that he felt he was too far down the runway to attempt a go around, so he turned the airplane off into the grass. The nose strut collapsed and the propeller struck the ground. The probable cause was found to be the pilot's misjudgment of the flare and his improper recovery from a bounced landing.
- One June 1, 2004, a Cessna 150 collided with the terrain during a go-around at the Jack Barstow Airport. The student pilot reported he maintained an airspeed of 70 miles per hour with 20 degrees of flaps until he began the landing flare. He stated the airplane ballooned and drifted "slightly right" during the flare. He applied left aileron in an attempt to realign the airplane, but it veered to the left. He stated he then added full power at which time the airplane banked to the left. The left wing contacted the ground and the airplane cart wheeled, slid across a taxiway, and came to rest alongside a ditch. The probable cause was found to be the student pilot's failure to maintain control of the airplane during the go-around.
- On July 16, 2014, a Cessna 120 experienced a hard landing at Jack Barstow Airport. The pilot was flying an approach to landing at minimum airspeed because he intended to perform a short field landing, but after clearing trees on the approach end of the runway, a "significant sink rate" developed. The pilot applied power, but it was insufficient to arrest the descent rate. The airplane landed hard on the main wheels and the propeller impacted the grass runway. The airplane nosed over during the landing roll which resulted in substantial damage to the firewall and empennage. The probable cause was found to be the pilot's failure to maintain sufficient airspeed and his delayed application of engine power while on short final which resulted in a hard landing.
- On August 3, 2018, a Brantly B-2A sustained an in-flight tail rotor blade separation and impacted terrain during an emergency landing at the Jack Barstow Airport. While operating 2,000 feet above the ground 1/4 mile from the airport, the pilot felt a "flutter" emit from the helicopter and heard a subsequent "bang" noise emit from the rear of the helicopter. The helicopter immediately turned 180 degrees to the right, the pilot reduced collective, and he was able to maintain control of the helicopter. The pilot increased the airspeed and maneuvered the helicopter for an emergency landing at the airport.

== See also ==
- List of airports in Michigan
