= Grace A. Dow =

American philanthropist (1869–1953)

Grace A. Dow

Grace Anna Dow (/daʊ/; 1869–1953) was an American philanthropist. She is best known as the wife of Herbert H. Dow, inventor, entrepreneur and founder of Dow Chemical Company, and mother of architect Alden B. Dow and Willard Dow, who succeeded his father as president of Dow.

== Personal ==
She was born in Michigan as Grace Anna Ball in 1869 to Arnelia and George Willard Ball, a schoolteacher and banker, respectively. In 1892, she married Herbert Henry Dow in Midland, Michigan.

Grace and Herbert raised seven children together. She lived most of her married life in Midland, except for a short period in Cleveland, Ohio early in her husband's business career.

== Philanthropy ==
After her husband's death, Grace Dow founded the Herbert H. and Grace A. Dow Foundation in his memory. She served as a trustee of the Foundation until her death. The Foundation is dedicated to funding religion, education, culture, science, and community life in Michigan.

In April 1941, Grace Dow donated ten acres (later increased to 40 acres) of property as the site for Midland Hospital (now MyMichigan Medical Center Midland). Relatives recalled her joy in making the gift, which was adjacent to the Dow family orchards. She joked, "If nothing else, they can sit there and eat apples while they have to be in the hospital."

Throughout her life, Grace Dow frequently contributed to projects in the Midland community personally as well as through the activities of the Dow Foundation. She personally donated to a variety of local church construction projects, including donation of an Italian marble altar for St. Bridget's Catholic Church; and supported missionary work at home and abroad. She served a number of years as president of the Presbyterian Women's Missionary Society, and provided help to those in need.

Grace Dow was an active member of several civic organizations including a women's study club, the Monday Club, for which she served two presidencies; co-founder of the John Alden Chapter of the Daughters of the American Revolution, for which she was the first Regent and served a 3-year term on the state board; and served 50 years on the Midland Library board. In the early 1950s she was involved in the planning and funding through the Foundation of a new library building, which was designed by her son, architect Alden Dow. Grace died in 1953 before construction began.

== Legacy and honors ==
- Midland named the new library as the Grace A. Dow Memorial Library in her honor.
- She founded The Herbert H. and Grace A. Dow Foundation and donated to numerous civic projects through it, including health care and education.
