= Midland, Michigan =

City in Midland, Michigan, United States

- City
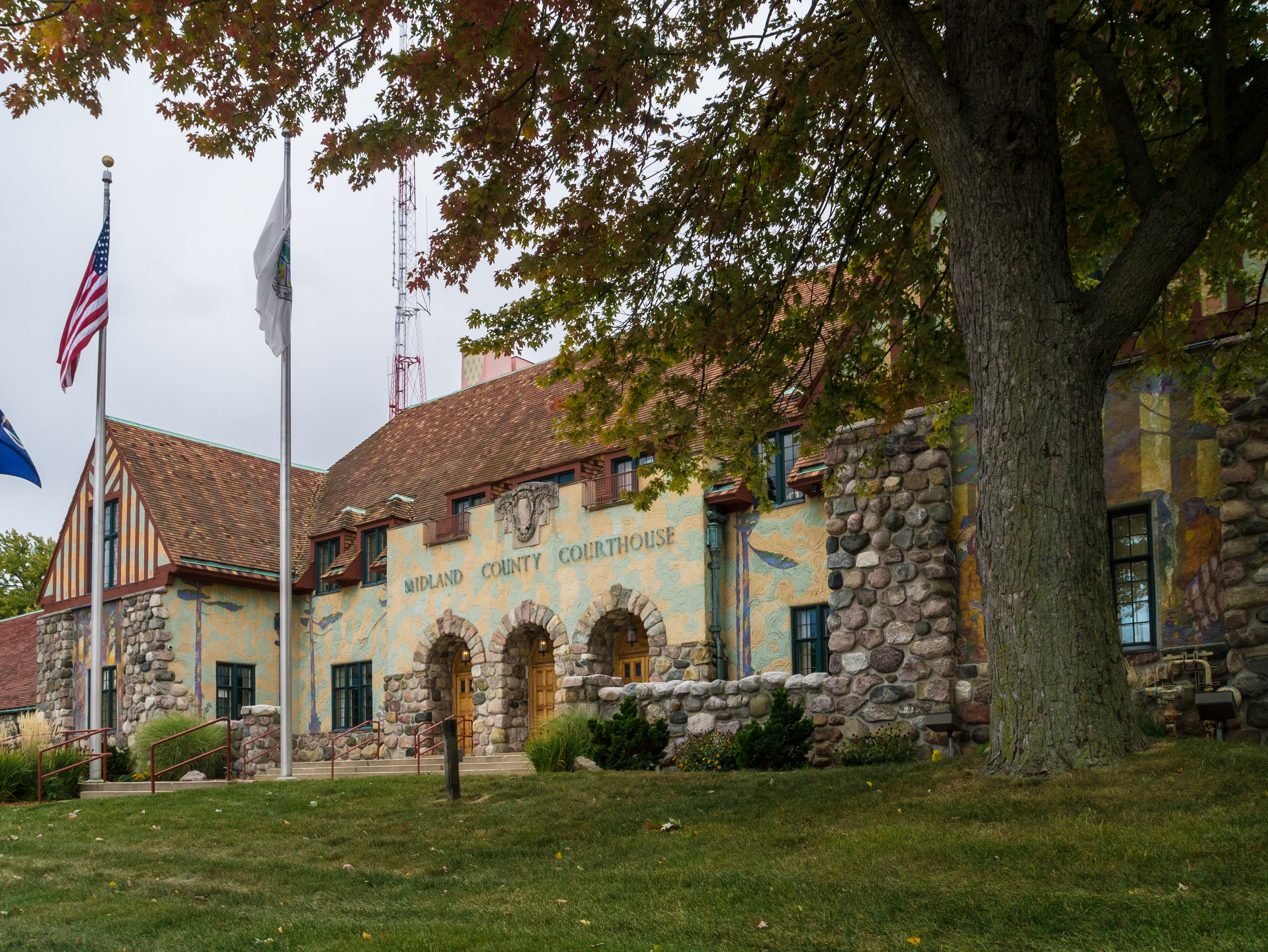
- Midland County Courthouse in Midland

- Flag Seal

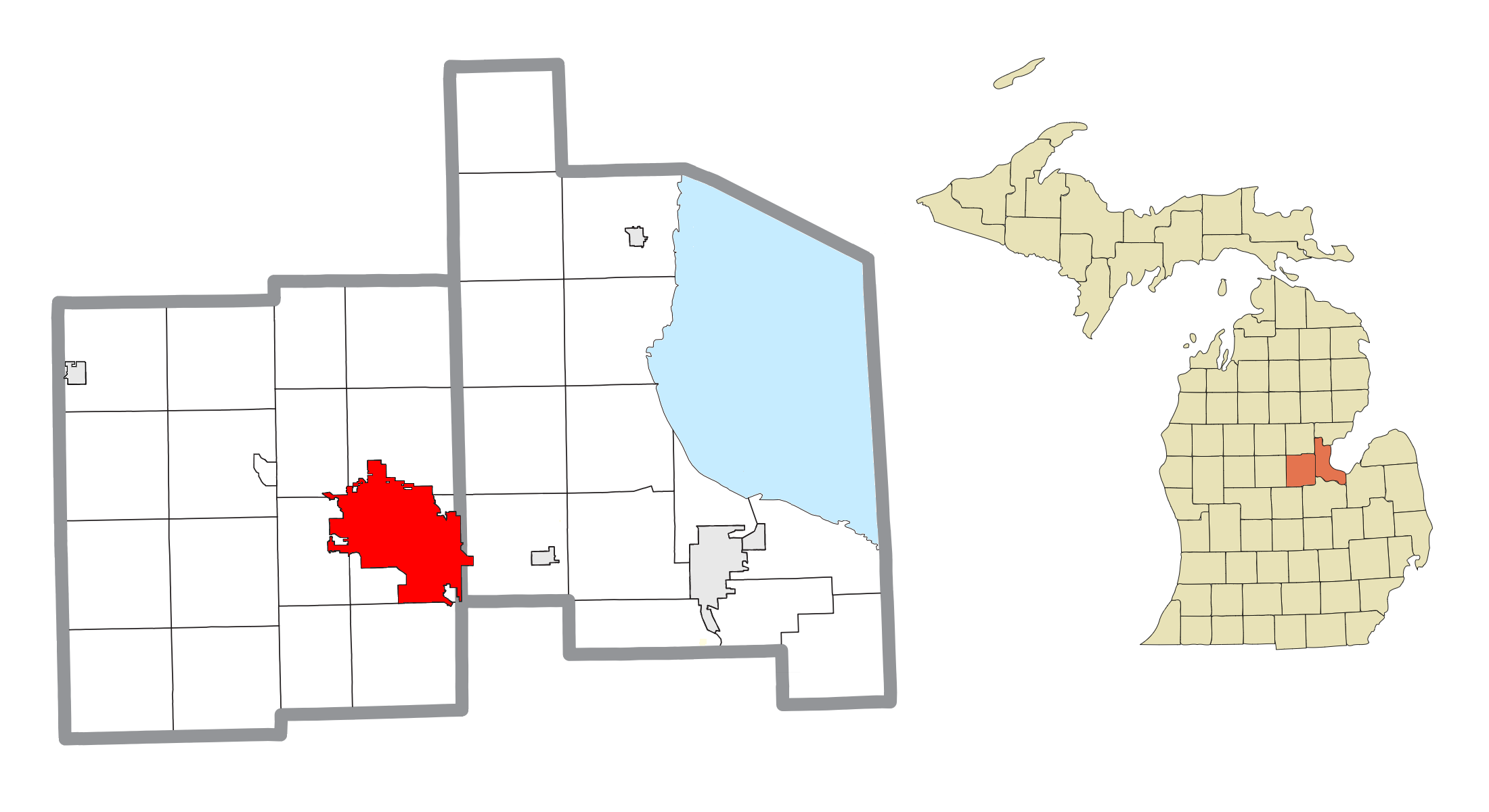
- Location within Bay County (right) and Midland County (left)

- Location within Michigan Location within the United States
- Coordinates: 43°36′56″N 84°14′50″W
- Country: United States
- State: Michigan
- Counties: Midland; Bay
- Incorporated: 1887

Government
  - Type: Council–manager

Area
  - City: 36.34 sq mi (94.12 km^{2})
  - Land: 34.37 sq mi (89.02 km^{2})
  - Water: 1.97 sq mi (5.11 km^{2})
  - Urban: 30.69 sq mi (79.48 km^{2})
- Elevation: 696 ft (212 m)

Population (2020)
  - City: 42,547
  - Density: 1,237.9/sq mi (477.96/km^{2})
  - Urban: 49,387
  - Metro: 82,874
- Time zone: UTC-5 (Eastern (EST))
  - Summer (DST): UTC-4 (EDT)
- ZIP Codes: 48623 (Freeland); 48640–48642, 48667, 48670, 48674, 48686
- Area code: 989
- FIPS code: 26-53780
- GNIS feature ID: 0632282
- Website: cityofmidlandmi.gov

Midland is a city in the state of Michigan and is the county seat of Midland County. The population was 42,547 at the 2020 census. It is the principal city of the Midland metropolitan statistical area, part of the larger Saginaw-Midland-Bay City combined statistical area. The city is bordered by Midland Township, though the two are administered separately.

Midland is located at the confluence of Chippewa and Tittabawassee rivers in Central Michigan. The city is home to the headquarters of Dow Chemical Company, one of the largest chemical producers in the world, which was founded by Herbert Henry Dow in the city in 1897. Midland was ranked first as the "Best Place to Retire" in 2026 by U.S. News & World Report.

== History ==
By the late 1820s, Midland was established as a fur trading post of the American Fur Company supervised by the post at Saginaw. Here agents purchased furs from Ojibwe trappers. The Campau family of Detroit operated an independent trading post at this location in the late 1820s.

Dow Chemical Company was founded in Midland in 1897, and its world headquarters are still located there. Through the influence of a Dow Chemical plant opening in Handa, Aichi, Japan, Midland and Handa have become sister cities. Dow Corning was also headquartered in Midland.

In 1969, the city unilaterally defined a Midland Urban Growth Area (MUGA), a two-mile territory around the city limits, in an attempt to control urban sprawl. As the county's only capable drinking water supplier, the city would provide water services to communities outside the MUGA such as the nearby village of Sanford. The city would not provide water services within the MUGA without annexation to the city of Midland. This allowed the city to control most of the growth in the county. Since 1991, the policy has since been revised with a series of Urban Cooperation Act Agreements with surrounding townships. Case-by-case redrawings of the MUGA line now allow Midland to sell water to the surrounding townships without annexation.

On May 19, 2020, the Sanford Dam and Edenville Dam both failed, prompting an evacuation of 10,000 Midland residents. Governor Gretchen Whitmer declared a state of emergency, predicting that parts of Midland and Sanford would be covered in nine feet of water within 12–15 hours. She urged residents to seek shelter with family and friends or at emergency shelters. This major "500 year" flooding event occurred just months after the COVID-19 stay at home order went into effect.

== Geography ==
The city lies within eastern Midland County, with a small portion extending east into Bay County. Most of the city's area is incorporated from Midland Township. The city is 24 miles (39 km) northwest of Saginaw and 19 miles (31 km) west of Bay City. Midland, along with Saginaw and Bay City make up the Tri-Cities Area, a sub-region of Flint/Tri-Cities.

According to the U.S. Census Bureau, the city has a total area of 36.3 square miles (94.02 km^{2}), of which 34.4 square miles (89.10 km^{2}) are land and 2.0 square miles (5.18 km^{2}), or 5.41%, are water. The Chippewa River joins the Tittabawassee River at the city's downtown. The Tittabawassee is a tributary of the Saginaw River, flowing southeast to Saginaw Bay in Lake Huron.

=== Neighborhoods ===
Midland neighborhoods

There are more than 35 neighborhoods within the city, each having one or more subdivisions. According to the map, there are eight general areas:

- Downtown encompasses the central business district and is a hub for commerce, dining, and cultural activities. The Center City includes the historic "Circle", dating from 1938, which was the city's second business district.
- North Side neighborhoods north of downtown, often with a mix of residential areas, parks and schools.
- Country Club features upscale houses, large lots with trees, highest walkability and bike scores.
- Midland West neighborhoods are known as friendly and peaceful with well-maintained properties. It includes the Chippewa and Tittabawassee Rivers, parks and open spaces for recreation, often with a mix of housing styles and mature trees. Upscale Greystone Woods is located there.
- East End refers to the area east of downtown, often characterized by a mix of older residential and commercial spaces. A revitalization of Midtown started in 2018, along with Grove Park and surrounding neighborhoods and formation of the Midtown Midland Neighborhood Association.
- Industrial Park was the former location of Dow Chemical's plants along the Bay City Road corridor. In 2018, Dow Michigan Operations Industrial Park (I-Park), was created on the 2,600 acres (1,100 ha; 4.1 mi^{2}; 11 km^{2}) site that serves multiple companies as a logistics, manufacturing and R&D center for approximately 6,000 employees/contractors. While owned by Dow, it is supported by the Michigan Strategic Fund for modernization that will attract businesses with their utilities, logistics and environmental services.
- West Main Street Historic district was established in 1979 to preserve and document Midland's historical structures; specifically blocks and lots within the original Midland plat, offering a glimpse into the city's history. A commission reviews and must approve applications for construction, additions, alterations, repairs, moves, excavations, or demolitions of all properties within the district.
- South refers to the relatively small area south of the Industrial Park, site of a defunct lumber town (Mapleton) and train depot.

Discovery Square is an area in the city of Midland containing five prominent buildings designed by Alden B. Dow on land originally owned by his father, Herbert Henry Dow. They are: Grace A. Dow Memorial Library, Midland Center for the Arts, Michigan Molecular Institute, Dow Gardens and Alden Dow House and Studio. Alden Dow coined the name at the dedication of MCFTA in 1971.

=== Climate ===
Midland has a humid continental climate (Dfb) with hot, rainy summers with cool nights and cold, snowy winters with average highs around freezing.

Climate data for Midland, Michigan (1991–2020 normals, extremes 1970–present)
Month	Jan	Feb	Mar	Apr	May	Jun	Jul	Aug	Sep	Oct	Nov	Dec	Year
Record high °F (°C)	60 (16)	67 (19)	86 (30)	88 (31)	96 (36)	103 (39)	100 (38)	100 (38)	95 (35)	89 (32)	75 (24)	67 (19)	103 (39)
Mean maximum °F (°C)	48.8 (9.3)	49.8 (9.9)	65.6 (18.7)	77.8 (25.4)	86.0 (30.0)	91.7 (33.2)	92.4 (33.6)	91.2 (32.9)	87.6 (30.9)	78.6 (25.9)	64.1 (17.8)	52.7 (11.5)	94.6 (34.8)
Mean daily maximum °F (°C)	29.3 (−1.5)	31.9 (−0.1)	42.7 (5.9)	55.8 (13.2)	68.3 (20.2)	77.9 (25.5)	82.1 (27.8)	79.7 (26.5)	72.9 (22.7)	59.9 (15.5)	45.7 (7.6)	34.4 (1.3)	56.7 (13.7)
Daily mean °F (°C)	22.9 (−5.1)	24.7 (−4.1)	34.0 (1.1)	45.9 (7.7)	58.0 (14.4)	67.6 (19.8)	71.8 (22.1)	69.9 (21.1)	62.5 (16.9)	50.9 (10.5)	38.7 (3.7)	28.8 (−1.8)	48.0 (8.9)
Mean daily minimum °F (°C)	16.6 (−8.6)	17.5 (−8.1)	25.3 (−3.7)	35.9 (2.2)	47.6 (8.7)	57.3 (14.1)	61.5 (16.4)	60.1 (15.6)	52.2 (11.2)	41.8 (5.4)	31.8 (−0.1)	23.2 (−4.9)	39.2 (4.0)
Mean minimum °F (°C)	−1.7 (−18.7)	−0.3 (−17.9)	6.9 (−13.9)	22.4 (−5.3)	33.6 (0.9)	42.9 (6.1)	49.9 (9.9)	48.9 (9.4)	38.1 (3.4)	28.9 (−1.7)	17.5 (−8.1)	7.1 (−13.8)	−5.2 (−20.7)
Record low °F (°C)	−19 (−28)	−15 (−26)	−10 (−23)	10 (−12)	23 (−5)	32 (0)	39 (4)	35 (2)	28 (−2)	18 (−8)	3 (−16)	−11 (−24)	−19 (−28)
Average precipitation inches (mm)	2.01 (51)	1.92 (49)	2.00 (51)	3.48 (88)	3.74 (95)	3.71 (94)	2.82 (72)	3.17 (81)	2.82 (72)	3.14 (80)	2.65 (67)	1.95 (50)	33.41 (849)
Average snowfall inches (cm)	9.1 (23)	8.1 (21)	3.1 (7.9)	0.6 (1.5)	0.0 (0.0)	0.0 (0.0)	0.0 (0.0)	0.0 (0.0)	0.0 (0.0)	0.0 (0.0)	1.0 (2.5)	9.5 (24)	31.4 (79.9)
Average precipitation days (≥ 0.01 in)	12.0	8.9	9.7	12.3	12.7	10.7	10.3	10.7	9.6	13.2	12.2	11.6	133.9
Average snowy days (≥ 0.1 in)	6.1	4.7	2.1	0.4	0.0	0.0	0.0	0.0	0.0	0.0	0.9	5.6	19.8
Source: NOAA

== Demographics ==
There are actually 18 locations named "Midland" in the United States. In terms of population, Midland, Michigan is the second-largest Midland in the United States, after Midland, Texas.

Historical population
Census	Pop.	Note	%±
1870	1,160		—
1880	1,529		31.8%
1890	2,277		48.9%
1900	2,363		3.8%
1910	2,527		6.9%
1920	5,483		117.0%
1930	8,038		46.6%
1940	10,329		28.5%
1950	14,285		38.3%
1960	27,779		94.5%
1970	38,176		37.4%
1980	37,035		−3.0%
1990	38,053		2.7%
2000	41,685		9.5%
2010	41,863		0.4%
2020	42,547		1.6%
2023 (est.)	42,663		0.3%
U.S. Decennial Census

=== 2020 census ===
As of the 2020 census, Midland had a population of 42,547. The median age was 39.2 years. 22.2% of residents were under the age of 18 and 19.2% of residents were 65 years of age or older. For every 100 females there were 92.9 males, and for every 100 females age 18 and over there were 88.7 males age 18 and over.

98.7% of residents lived in urban areas, while 1.3% lived in rural areas.

There were 18,084 households in Midland, of which 27.9% had children under the age of 18 living in them. Of all households, 46.3% were married-couple households, 17.1% were households with a male householder and no spouse or partner present, and 29.7% were households with a female householder and no spouse or partner present. About 32.6% of all households were made up of individuals and 13.9% had someone living alone who was 65 years of age or older.

There were 19,377 housing units, of which 6.7% were vacant. The homeowner vacancy rate was 1.1% and the rental vacancy rate was 7.4%.

Racial composition as of the 2020 census
Race	Number	Percent
White	36,811	86.5%
Black or African American	836	2.0%
American Indian and Alaska Native	157	0.4%
Asian	1,448	3.4%
Native Hawaiian and Other Pacific Islander	74	0.2%
Some other race	459	1.1%
Two or more races	2,762	6.5%
Hispanic or Latino (of any race)	1,650	3.9%

=== 2010 census ===
As of the census of 2010, there were 41,863 people, 17,506 households, and 10,766 families residing in the city. The population density was 1,242.2 inhabitants per square mile (479.6/km^{2}). There were 18,578 housing units at an average density of 551.3 per square mile (212.9/km^{2}). The racial makeup of the city was 92.0% White, 2.0% Black, 0.3% Native American, 3.3% Asian, 0.1% Pacific Islander, 0.5% from other races, and 1.8% from two or more races. Hispanic or Latino of any race were 2.4% of the population.

There were 17,506 households, of which 30.4% had children under the age of 18 living with them, 48.1% were married couples living together, 9.8% had a female householder with no husband present, 3.5% had a male householder with no wife present, and 38.5% were non-families. 31.8% of all households were made up of individuals, and 12.8% had someone living alone who was 65 years of age or older. The average household size was 2.33 and the average family size was 2.94.

The median age in the city was 38.3 years. 23.4% of residents were under the age of 18; 11.1% were between the ages of 18 and 24; 23.8% were from 25 to 44; 26.2% were from 45 to 64; and 15.6% were 65 years of age or older. The gender makeup of the city was 48.1% male and 51.9% female.

=== 2000 census ===
As of the census of 2000, there were 41,685 people, 16,743 households, and 11,000 families residing in the city. The population density was 1,254.9 inhabitants per square mile (484.5/km^{2}). There were 17,773 housing units at an average density of 535.0 per square mile (206.6/km^{2}). The racial makeup of the city was 93.38% White, 1.82% Black, 0.29% Native American, 2.69% Asian, 0.06% Pacific Islander, 0.57% from other races, and 1.19% from two or more races. Hispanic or Latino of any race were 1.92% of the population.

There were 16,743 households, out of which 33.2% had children under the age of 18 living with them, 54.4% were married couples living together, 8.7% had a female householder with no husband present, and 34.3% were non-families. 28.6% of all households were made up of individuals, and 11.4% had someone living alone who was 65 years of age or older. The average household size was 2.42 and the average family size was 3.00.

In the city, the age distribution of the population shows 25.9% under the age of 18, 10.2% from 18 to 24, 27.9% from 25 to 44, 22.2% from 45 to 64, and 13.9% who were 65 years of age or older. The median age was 36 years. For every 100 females, there were 92.0 males. For every 100 females age 18 and over, there were 88.1 males.

The median income for a household in the city was $48,444, and the median income for a family was $64,949. Males had a median income of $53,208 versus $31,098 for females. The per capita income for the city was $26,818. About 5.5% of families and 8.8% of the population were below the poverty line, including 9.5% of those under age 18 and 7.2% of those age 65 or over.

== Economy ==
The economy had a 2024 GDP estimate of $6.38 billion, is driven by advanced chemical manufacturing, research and development, professional services, and healthcare.
Manufacturing provides the largest contribution to the local economy, anchored by the Dow Chemical Company and its 2,600 acres (1,100 ha) Michigan Operations Industrial Park. The I-Park houses major global tenants including Corteva Agriscience, Hemlock Semiconductor, DuPont Specialty Products, Roquette, and Trinseo.
Professional and Business Services is the next largest sector, consisting of corporate headquarters, engineering, R&D firms, and the Midland Business Alliance.
Education, healthcare, and social assistance are the third contributor which includes MyMichigan Medical Center Midland and Midland Public Schools. Both are major regional employers and service providers.
The city's major shopping district is located north of the town center, on Eastman Avenue near US-10. There are several big-box stores located here, as well as the Midland Mall. Midland's downtown, on Main Street, includes local restaurants, artist co-ops, and local retail. The Midland Towne Center is on South Saginaw Road extending from the Circle to Center City.

== Arts and culture ==
=== Historical markers ===
There are four recognized Michigan historical markers in the city.

- John and Almira Kelly House
- Midland County Courthouse
- Origins of Salt Industry / State Salt Well No. 1
- The Upper Bridge

=== Sites of interest ===
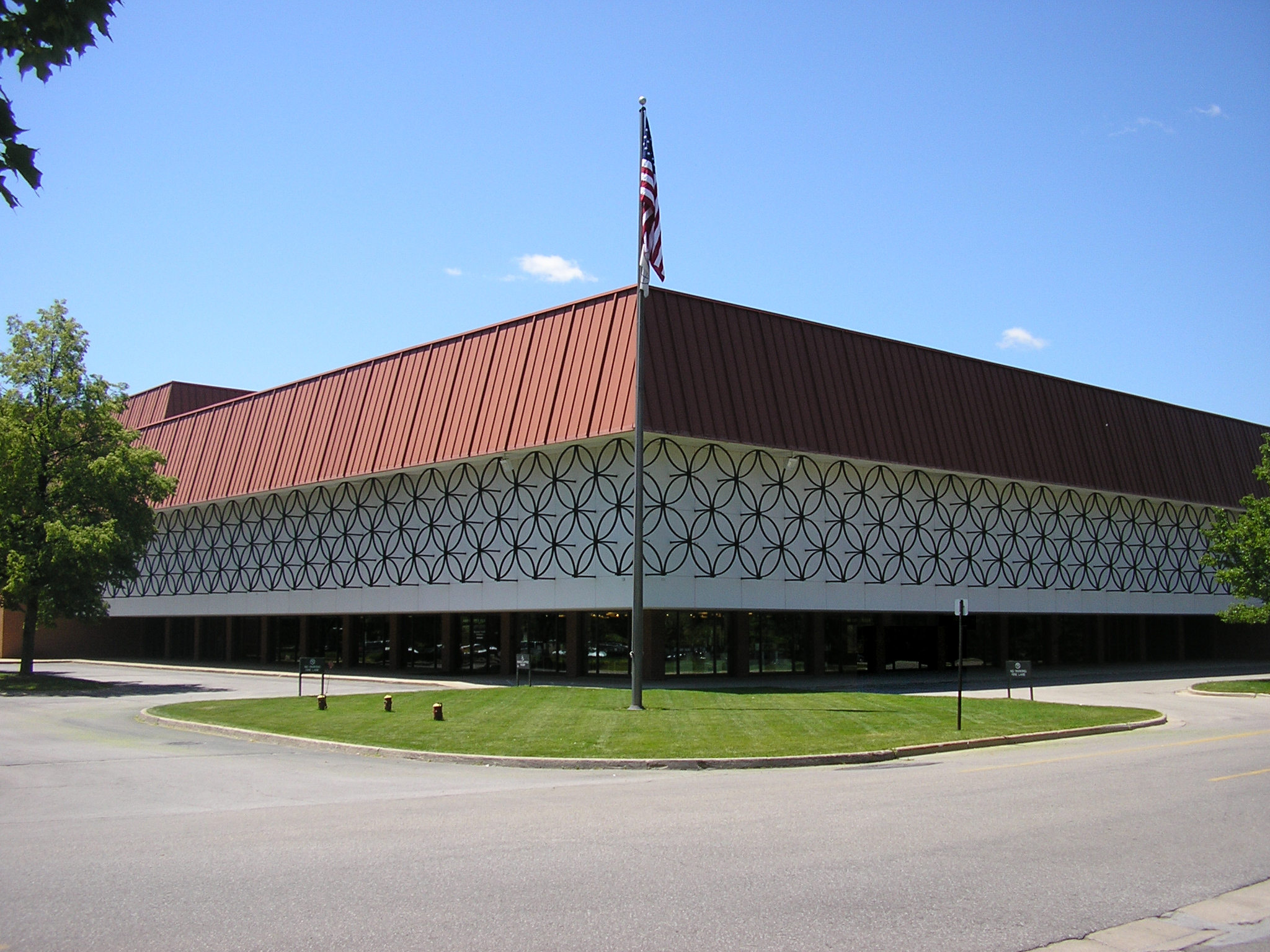
Midland Center for the Arts

Midland has many cultural opportunities in fields ranging from music and theater to science and the arts. The Midland Center for the Arts delivers hands-on exhibits in science, art and technology, at the Alden B. Dow Museum of Science and Art. The center also provides two state-of-the-art auditoriums for audiences of 400 to 1500 to enjoy everything from the Midland Symphony Orchestra and Center Stage Theatre, to professional programming through MATRIX: Midland.

Midland County Historical Societies Heritage Park provides an opportunity to explore Midland County's history through a variety of avenues. The Herbert D. Doan Midland County History Center houses a research library, gift shop and the interactive Dorothy Dow Arbury Midland County History Gallery, which provides hands on exhibits for exploring Midland County's history. Also located at Heritage Park is the Herbert H. Dow Historical Museum, which explores the history and growth of Dow Chemical Company founded in Midland by Herbert H. Dow. Also located on the campus is the Bradley Home Museum and Carriage House; this 1874 house built by Benjamin F. Bradley allows visitors to see an historic home and furnishings of its time. The Carriage House holds an extensive collection of sleighs and carriages, and it has the largest working blacksmith shop in the Mid-Michigan area.

Skaters of all skill levels use Midland's 107,000-square-foot (9,900 m^{2}) Civic Arena, which has two NHL-sized rinks and one Olympic-sized rink. A BMX track is located in Midland's Stratford park. Winner of a 2005 Michigan Cool Cities grant (a grass-roots, volunteer-based training program to revitalize a downtown area), Downtown Midland offers dining, shopping and entertainment for the whole family.

Also in the recreation mix are two golf courses, the Midland Community Center (with multiple swimming pools and exercise facilities), the West Midland Family Center, the North Midland Family Center, the Midland Gymnastics Training Center, the Midland Community Tennis Center and the Midland Curling Center.

=== Architecture ===
In the early 1930s, Alden B. Dow F.A.I.A. introduced modern design to Midland, Michigan and created over 130 structures during his 50-year career. His structures contributed to the city's architectural heritage. Dow's works inspired dozens of other architects, including Jackson Hallett A.I.A, Glenn Beach A.I.A., Robert Schwartz A.I.A, and Francis "Red" Warner A.I.A. These architects also created Mid-Century Modern structures that are an integral part of the over 400 buildings located in Midland.

=== Notable places ===
- Alden B. Dow Home & Studio
- Chippewa Nature Center
- Dahlia Hill
- Dow Chemical Company headquarters
- Dow Corning headquarters
- Dow Corning Midland plant
- Dow Diamond, Home of the Great Lakes Loons, the Single-A Affiliate of the Los Angeles Dodgers of the National League in Major League Baseball
- Dow Gardens
- Grace A. Dow Memorial Library
- Herbert H. Dow House
- Jack Barstow Municipal Airport
- Midland Center for the Arts
- Midland Civic Arena, a 1,000-seat indoor arena
- Midland Community Center
- Midland Community Stadium
- Midland Community Tennis Center
- Pere Marquette Rail-Trail
- The Tridge, a three-way pedestrian bridge over the Tittabawassee and Chippewa rivers.

More than 100 places of worship county-wide represent a variety of denominations and architectural styles, earning Midland the nickname "City of Beautiful Churches". Midland's Volunteer Center recruits upwards of 2,000 volunteers each year, and the United Way of Midland County supports 25 community organizations.

== Sports ==
Midland is home to many recreational sporting facilities and organizations. These include the civic ice arena which hosts 2 NHL and one Olympic-sized rinks, a skate park downtown, and the Midland Community Tennis Center and its 32 courts. The tennis center also hosts a USTA Pro Circuit event and was part of the USTA award to Midland as America's Best Tennis Town 2009.

The Dow Championship was introduced to the LPGA Tour schedule in 2019. This event is hosted at the Midland Country Club annually. The tournament was founded with the vision of building community and accelerating the efforts of the Great Lakes Bay Region and Dow's strategy by building a world-class and unique LPGA Tour event that positively impacts people's lives.

Midland is also host to the following professional sports teams.

Club	Sport	League	Venue	Logo
Great Lakes Loons	Baseball	Midwest League	Dow Diamond
Tri City Barbarians	Rugby	Michigan Rugby Football Union	Redcoats Complex

== Parks and recreation ==
There are no National or State Parks in Midland City or County; however, Midland City parks number 80+ with over 3,000 acres (1,200 ha) of park land. Seven are classified as Regional Parks, typically larger than 200 acres; seven are considered Community Parks, normally over 15 acres; Neighborhood Parks number 19, usually from five to ten acres in size, located within residential areas; and the 36 Mini-Parks are mostly less than an acre. Other city-owned land includes pathways, undeveloped areas intended for "passive recreation", waterfront areas and protected natural areas.

Walkers, joggers, bikers, and skaters can use the Pere Marquette Rail-Trail, a ribbon of asphalt stretching 30 miles (50 km) to the neighboring city of Clare. Midland County's system of natural pathways continues to expand with the recent addition of the Chippewa Trail, which connects to the Pere Marquette trail. The Chippewa Trail ends at the Chippewa Nature Center. This has a territory of more than 1,000 acres (400 ha) of deciduous and coniferous woods, rivers, ponds, wetlands (marsh, fen, bog, and swamp) and upland fields.

Midland's Dow Gardens feature 100-acre (40 ha) of flower and vegetable gardens, water features plus an arboretum. These were the original gardens of the Herbert H. Dow homestead and are open for tours. In addition, the Alden B. Dow Home and Studio offers tours of this landmark American architect's unique and influential style. Alden B. Dow F.A.I.A designed the Grace A. Dow Memorial Library, Midland's public library named in his mother's honor.

Whiting Forest, home to the longest Canopy Walk in the nation, is connected to Dow Gardens with a series of pedestrian bridges and walks. The canopy walk is suspended up to 40 feet above the ground and is 1,400 feet long. Visitors can walk the trails, play in the children's playground and enjoy drinks and snacks in the cafe.

Dahlia Hill is a terraced garden and organization near Emerson Park that annually grows over 3,000 Dahlia plants that flower in late summer. The Chippewa Nature Center is a protected wildlife area with miles of trails and the Tridge is a three-way bridge over the Chippewa and Tittabawassee Rivers at Chippewassee Park. Other parks include Midland City Forest, Plymouth Park & Fun Zone, Emerson Park, Barstow Woods Park, and Central Park.

Heritage Park is at the Northwood University campus and an attraction featuring the 1874 Victorian Gothic Bradley Home; a brine well and the Herbert Dow Museum which is a replication of the Evens Flour Gristmill; and the Carriage House, which contains an operating blacksmith shop and a display of carriages and sleighs, all horse-drawn.

== Government ==
Midland uses the council–manager form of government. The council consists of five members elected from geographic wards. Council members serve a two-year term, and the full council is elected during even years. The mayor and the mayor pro tem are chosen from the elected council by a vote of the council, who also appoint the city manager and city attorney, who serve at the pleasure of the council. Federally, Midland is located in Michigan's 8th congressional district, represented by Democrat Kristen McDonald Rivet.

=== City Commissioners ===
5 members, elected from wards

Ward	Commissioner	End Term	Mayor
1	Tim Solar	2028	
2	Maureen Donker	2028	Mayor
3	Dave Pasek	2028	
4	Diane Brown Wilhelm	2028	Pro Tem
5	Aaron Majorana	2028	

The appointed city manager is Brad Kaye; Clerk is Lacey Todd; Treasurer is Dana Strayer

== Education ==
K-12 public schools are generally rated excellent, and higher education is anchored locally by Northwood University along with several nearby colleges and universities.

- Midland Public Schools (Dow High and Midland High)
- Bullock Creek Public Schools
- Davenport University
- Michigan State University (research facility)
- Northwood University, a private university specializing in business and management
- Delta College Midland Center (DCMC)
- Ross Medical Education Center
- Alternative High Schools
  - Education and Training Connection (ETC)
  - Windover High School
- Good Shepherd Lutheran School
- Calvary Baptist Academy (since 1973)

== Media ==
Midland Community Television Network is the City of Midland's public, government, and education access cable television channel group.

Midland is the city of license of two FM radio stations serving the Tri-Cities (Saginaw/Bay City/Midland) area. WKQZ ("Z93") is an active rock station owned by Cumulus Media and broadcasting at 93.3 FM. WUGN is a non-commercial station at 99.7 FM owned by Family Life Communications, broadcasting adult-contemporary Christian music and teaching.

WMPX (1490 AM) is Midland's "hometown" locally owned radio station, owned by Black Diamond Broadcasting and airing an Adult Contemporary format. WMPX has an FM simulcast station in Beaverton, Michigan, WMRX (97.7 FM), which airs a small amount of local weekend programming separate from the AM. Other area stations include WEJC (88.3 FM) in White Star, Michigan, which airs contemporary Christian music and is affiliated with the Lansing-based "Smile FM" network; WPRJ (101.7 FM) in Coleman, Michigan, a Christian Variety station known as "Radio U"; and country music station WGDN (103.1 FM) in nearby Gladwin, Michigan.

Midland is also served by radio and television stations from Saginaw, Bay City, Flint, Mount Pleasant, and Houghton Lake.

Midland's main newspaper is the Midland Daily News.

== Infrastructure ==
=== Healthcare ===
Midland is a clinical and administrative hub of MyMichigan Health, a regional health system that is affiliated with University of Michigan Medicine and includes a 324-bed hospital. Several other entities provide urgent care and family medicine including Pro-Health Urgent Care of Midland, New Hope Urgent Care of Midland and Midland Express Urgent and Family Care. . Healthcare is available and accessible to all residents. More than 95% of the population has health insurance, the percentage of smokers is less than the national average and community life expectancy exceeds 79 years.

=== Transportation ===
Scheduled airline service is available from MBS International Airport near Freeland and Flint's Bishop International Airport. The Jack Barstow Municipal Airport, dedicated May 30, 1936, is a general aviation airport operated by the city and available for general aviation aircraft.

There is no regularly scheduled public transportation. Residents can call in advance to schedule pickup or return transport by one government sponsored agency, "Dial-A-Ride", offering transport within the city only. Then there is "County Connection" a private run public transport for those outside the city of Midland but still within Midland County both for a nominal fee. Both also offer reduced fare rides for elderly and youth.

- US 10, a freeway passing the northern edge of Midland, connects with Bay City on the east; Clare and Ludington (as a two-lane highway) to the west.
- Bus. US 10 is a business loop through the downtown.
- M-20 connects Midland with Mount Pleasant and Big Rapids to the west.
- M-30 runs northerly from nearby Sanford to West Branch.
- M-47 links from US-10 east of the city to Saginaw and MBS International Airport

=== Power ===
In 1967, Dow Chemical attained criticality on a 100 kW nuclear research reactor at the Midland facility, primarily as a neutron source and to irradiate samples. The reactor continues to operate as of 2023.

In 1968, Consumers Power (now Consumers Energy) began construction of a nuclear power plant in Midland, primarily for Dow Chemical Company. The project's budget was $257 million, with completion anticipated in 1972. Extreme construction problems caused years of delays and costs soared. The Three Mile Island accident in 1979 resulted in a massive change in nuclear regulatory requirements and system redesign. When it was revealed that the containment buildings were settling and foundation cracks were discovered, Dow canceled their contract with Consumers Power, and the project was abandoned in 1984. The $4.1 billion investment nearly bankrupted Consumers Power. However, in 1985, Consumers Power formed a partnership with eight other companies to convert Midland's abandoned nuclear plant into a gas-fired power plant. Transformation of the plant began in 1986 and was completed at a cost of $500 million. The Midland Cogeneration Venture began producing power in 1991 and that success restored faith in Consumers Power. The facility now produces 10% of the power consumption for the lower peninsula of Michigan.

The predominant provider of electricity and natural gas in Midland is Consumers Energy.

=== Water and sewer ===
The city of Midland provides sewer and water service to city residents and certain adjoining townships. Due to brackish water in the aquifers, a 65-mile-long (105 km), 72-inch-diameter (180 cm) underground pipeline and intake structure one mile (1.6 km) offshore was constructed in 1948 to supply water from Lake Huron at White Stone Point, north of Au Gres to water treatment plants in Saginaw and Midland. A second 66-inch-diameter (170 cm) underground pipeline and intake structure two miles (3.2 km) offshore were added by 1996. Together they provide 230 million US gallons (870 million litres) per day. The intakes have screens to eliminate fish and debris, and chlorine is added to kill zebra mussels and bacteria. The Saginaw-Midland Municipal Water Supply Corporation (SMMWSC) operates the pumping system which is owned by the cities of Saginaw and Midland.

Midland's water plant adds chemicals to disinfect and further purify it. The water is tested continuously to meet federal and state standards. The potable water is pumped to water towers and underground facilities for storage until demand requires it. The city is capable of delivering up to 48 million US gallons (180 million litres) each day. There is also a 110 million US gallons (420 million litres) open reservoir on the north side of town for use in an emergency or "flow equalization".

The City of Midland, adopted a policy of "No Annexation, No Water" which has led to the growth of the city as well as the surrounding areas. In unincorporated areas without municipal water, private wells and septic systems are required.

=== Waste disposal ===
The City of Midland, Michigan operates a waste disposal site and landfill for residents and businesses of Midland County. Hazardous waste is accepted quarterly by appointment. City residents have weekly collection of yard waste and household garbage. There is monthly collection of recyclables, large heavy items and brush. Some Midland townships may offer garbage services, but all county residents may dispose of 3 cubic yards (2.3 m^{3}) once a month without charge at the landfill.

== Notable people ==
- Keegan Akin, Major League Baseball pitcher
- Bobby Anderson, NFL player, member of College Football Hall of Fame
- Dick Anderson, safety for undefeated 1972 Miami Dolphins
- Jeff Backus, former offensive tackle for NFL's Detroit Lions
- Mary Brown, Michigan state legislator and educator
- Bo Biteman, member of the Wyoming State Senate
- David Lee Camp, former member of United States House of Representatives
- Michael Cohrs, member of Court and Financial Policy Committee Bank of England
- Terry Collins, manager of New York Mets
- Mikey "Bug" Cox, ex-drummer of Coal Chamber
- Leland Doan, president and CEO of Dow Chemical 1949-1962 for 14 years
- Ted Doan, last Dow family member to lead Dow Chemical as president and CEO from 1962-1971
- Alden B. Dow, notable architect and son of Herbert Dow
- Grace A. Dow, philanthropist, wife of Herbert Dow
- Herbert H. Dow, founder of Dow Chemical
- Willard Dow, son of Herbert Dow, president and CEO of Dow Chemical for 19 years from 1930-1949
- Paul Emmel, MLB umpire
- Paul Ganus, television and feature film actor
- Gary Gerould, sportscaster for NBA's Sacramento Kings
- Carl Gerstacker, Dow Chemical Company chairman of the board for 17 years
- Cathy Guisewite, cartoonist known for comic strip Cathy
- James Aloysius Hickey, Cardinal Archbishop of Washington, D.C.
- Robert Jarvik, inventor of the Jarvik-7 artificial heart
- Larry Jaster, former MLB pitcher with St. Louis Cardinals, Montreal Expos, and Atlanta Braves
- David Kepler, former Dow Chemical Company CIO and president/chair of Four Lakes Task Force
- Jim Kern, MLB pitcher, attended high school in Midland
- Nancy LaMott, cabaret singer
- Dick Lange, former Major League Baseball pitcher
- Logan Lynn, musician, composer, singer, producer and LGBT activist
- Kevin Mahar, former MLB player (minor league of the Texas Rangers)
- Andrew Maxwell, football player for Michigan State University
- Meredith McGrath, former Women's Tennis Association professional
- Matt Mieske, former baseball player for five MLB teams
- John Moolenaar, U.S. representative for Michigan
- Chuck Moss, member of Michigan House of Representatives
- Howard Mudd, Pro Bowl offensive guard for San Francisco 49ers, assistant coach for Indianapolis Colts
- Joseph P. Overton, creator of the Overton Window
- Jalen Parmele, running back for six NFL teams
- Bill Schuette, former Michigan Attorney General, former District Court of Appeals Judge, former member of United States House of Representatives
- Jim Shaw, visual artist
- Steve Shelley, drummer of Sonic Youth
- Mary P. Sinclair, nuclear activist
- Peter Sinclair, environmental activist
- Charles J. Strosacker, Dow pioneer and philanthropist
- Cheryl Studer, opera singer
- Larry Teal, classical saxophonist and music educator
- Tom Vaughn, jazz pianist and Episcopal priest formerly at St. John's Episcopal Church
- Scott Winchester, former pitcher for Cincinnati Reds
- Roger L. Worsley, educator; reared in Midland; graduated in 1955 from Midland High School
- Andrew Wylie, offensive tackle for the Washington Commanders

== Sister cities ==
- Handa, Aichi, Japan
