= Herbert Henry Dow =

American chemical industrialist (1866–1930)

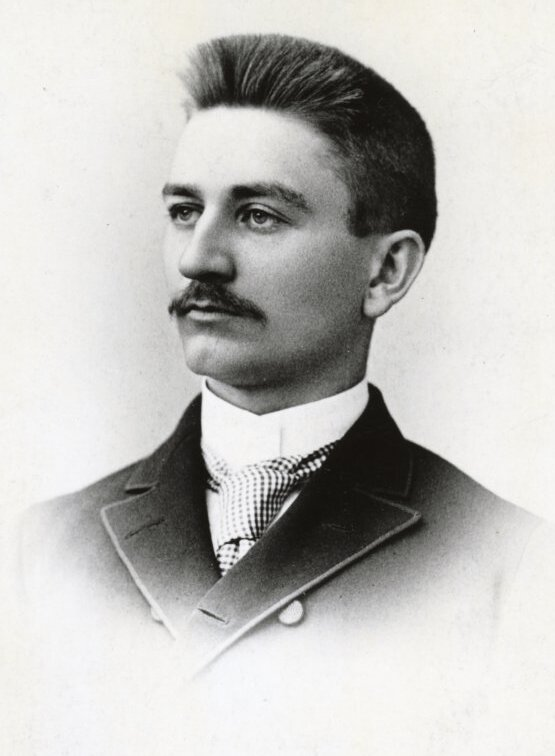
- Herbert Dow, founder of Dow Chemical
- Born: February 26, 1866; Belleville, Canada West
- Died: October 15, 1930 (aged 64); Rochester, Minnesota, United States
- Education: Case School of Applied Science
- Known for: the Dow process founding Dow Chemical Company
- Spouse: Grace Anna Ball (m. 1892)
- Children: 7
- Parents: Joseph Henry Dow (father); Sarah Bunnell (mother)
- Awards: Perkin Medal (1930)
- Scientific career
- Fields: Chemistry

Herbert Henry Dow (February 26, 1866 – October 15, 1930) was an American chemical industrialist who founded the American multinational conglomerate Dow Chemical. A graduate of the Case School of Applied Science in Cleveland, Ohio, he was a prolific inventor of chemical processes, compounds, and products, notably bromine extraction from brine water, and was a successful businessman.

== Biography ==
=== Early years ===
Herbert Henry Dow was born in 1866 in Belleville, Ontario, the eldest child of Americans Joseph Henry Dow, an inventor and mechanical engineer, and his wife, Sarah Bunnell, who were from Derby, Connecticut. When the infant boy was six weeks old, the family returned to their hometown. They moved again in 1878, this time to Cleveland to follow Joseph's job with the Derby Shovel Manufacturing Company.

After graduating from high school in 1884, Dow enrolled in the Case School of Applied Science (now known as Case Western Reserve University). While at Case, he became a member of the Phi Kappa Psi fraternity. He began specialized research into the chemical composition of brines in Ohio and nearby areas. He discovered that brine samples from Canton, Ohio and Midland, Michigan were very rich in bromine, which at the time was a primary ingredient in medicines and was widely used in the fledgeling photographic industry. Following his graduation from Case in 1888, Dow worked for a year as a chemistry professor at Huron Street Hospital College in Cleveland, while continuing his research into the extraction of chemicals from brine.

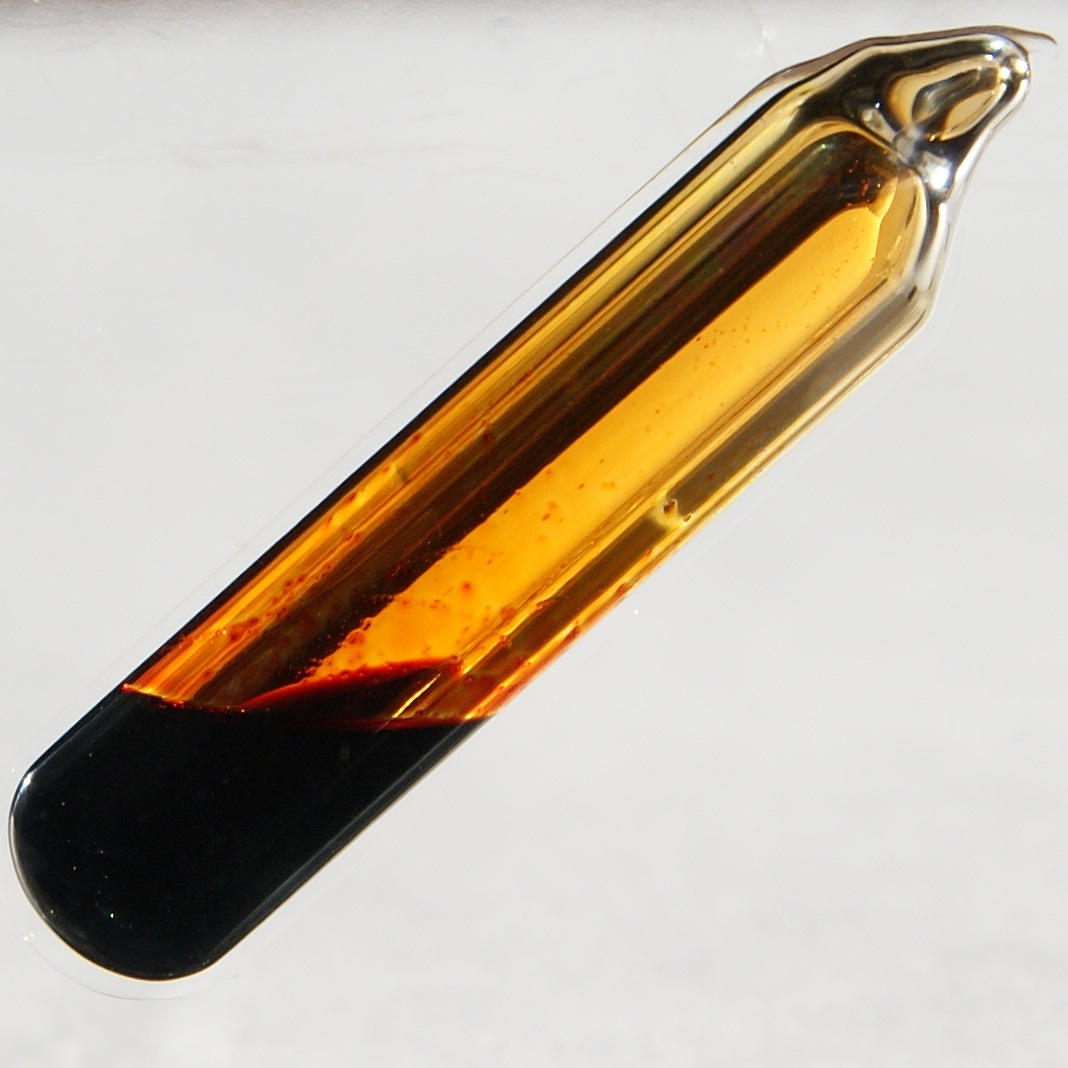
Bromine

=== Business career ===
In 1889, Dow received his first patent after inventing a more cost-effective and streamlined process for bromine extraction. He quickly formed his own company but was bankrupt within the year. His associates were impressed with his work and in 1890 helped him to found the Midland Chemical Company in Midland, Michigan. Dow continued his work extracting bromine, and by early 1891 he had invented the Dow process, a method of bromine extraction using electrolysis to oxidize bromide to bromine.

==== Foundation of Dow Chemical ====
Dow wanted to expand his research of electrolysis to yield other chemicals. His financial backers did not approve of his continued research and fired him from the Midland Chemical Company. He continued his research, developing a process to extract chlorine and caustic soda from sodium chloride.

After seeking funding from potential backers in Cleveland, including family friends and former Case School of Applied Science classmates, Dow secured funds from James T. Pardee, Albert W. Smith, J. H. Osborn, and Cady Staley. In 1895, Dow moved his young family to Massillon, Ohio and founded the Dow Process Company to develop the production mechanism for his process. The following year he returned to Midland, where he formed the Dow Chemical Company as successor to the Dow Process Company. The Dow Process Company was incorporated with 57 original stockholders. Within three years, his new company purchased the Midland Chemical Company.

==== Breaking a monopoly ====
Brine well, once ubiquitous in Midland

With his new company and new technology, Dow produced bromine very cheaply, and began selling it in the United States for 36 cents per pound. At the time, the German government supported a bromine cartel, Deutsche Bromkonvention, which had a near-monopoly on the supply of bromine, which they sold in the US for 49 cents per pound. The Germans had made it clear that they would dump the market with cheap bromine if Dow attempted to sell his product abroad. In 1904 Dow defied the cartel by beginning to export his bromine at its cheaper price to England. A few months later, an angry Bromkonvention representative visited Dow in his office and reminded him to cease exporting his bromine.

Unafraid, Dow continued exporting to England and Japan. The German cartel retaliated by dumping the US market with bromine at 15 cents a pound in an effort to put him out of business. Unable to compete with this predatory pricing in the U.S., Dow instructed his agents to buy up hundreds of thousands of pounds of the German bromine locally at the low price. The Dow company repackaged the bromine and exported it to Europe, selling it even to German companies at 27 cents a pound. The cartel, having expected Dow to go out of business, was unable to comprehend what was driving the enormous demand for bromine in the U.S., and where all the cheap imported bromine dumping their market was coming from. They suspected their own members of violating their price-fixing agreement and selling in Germany below the cartel's fixed cost. The cartel continued to slash prices on their bromine in the U.S., first to 12 cents a pound, and then to 10.5 cents per pound. The cartel finally caught on to Dow's tactic and realized that they could not keep selling below cost.

==== World War I ====
Dow Chemical Company focused on research, and soon was able to extract many more chemicals from brine. World War I provided demand that enabled its growth, because Britain blockaded the ports of Germany, which at the time included most of the world's largest chemical suppliers. Dow Chemical quickly moved to fill the gap for wartime goods, creating the Dow process to produce magnesium for incendiary flares, creating the Dow process to produce phenol and monochlorobenzene for explosives, and bromine for medicines and tear gas. By 1918, 90% of the Dow Chemical Company production was in support of the war effort. During this time period, Dow also created the diamond logo, which is still used by the Dow Chemical Company.

==== Auto industry ====
Following the conclusion of the war, Dow began to research the benefits of magnesium, which the company had in large supply. He discovered that it could be used to make automobile pistons. The new pistons proved to give more speed and better fuel efficiency. The Dowmetal pistons were used heavily in racing vehicles, and the 1921 winner of the Indianapolis 500 used the Dowmetal pistons in his vehicle.

=== Personal life ===
Dow married Grace Anna Ball, a teacher in Midland, on November 16, 1892. The union bore seven children between 1894 and 1908: Helen, Ruth, Willard, Osborn, Alden, Margaret and Dorothy Darling. One child, Osborn Curtis, died from Spinal meningitis before his third birthday in 1902. Willard became a chemist with his father's company, succeeding him as chief executive in 1930. Alden became one of the nation's leading architects.

The family house was shared with Herbert Dow's parents, Joseph and Sarah Dow, and his sisters, Helen and Mary Dow.

=== Death ===
Dow died October 15, 1930, from cirrhosis of the liver while receiving treatment at the Mayo Clinic. He had personally received over 90 patents. Dow was survived by his wife, Grace, and five of their seven children. His son Willard H. Dow assumed the presidency of Dow Chemical.

== Commemoration ==
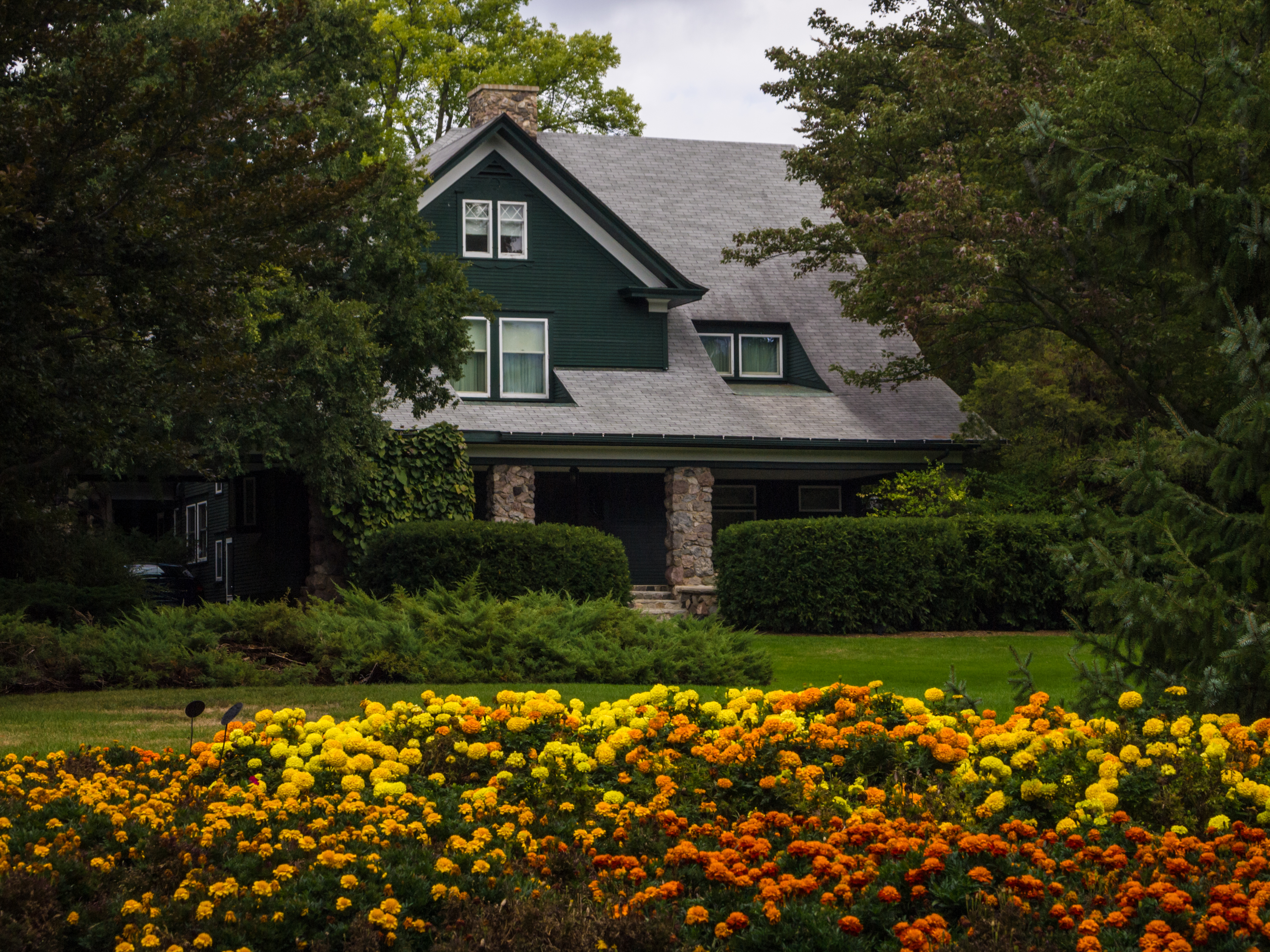
H. H. Dow House

In 1899, Dow started the Dow Gardens in Midland, Michigan, as a personal hobby on the grounds of their residence.

Herbert Henry Dow High School in Midland, Michigan opened in 1968, and is named after Dow. Among his awards is the Perkin Medal, received in 1930.

His home in Midland, Michigan known as Herbert H. Dow House, was declared a U.S. National Historic Landmark in 1976.

Grace established the Herbert H. and Grace A. Dow Foundation during 1936 in memory of her husband Herbert to enhance the quality of life for everyone in the Midland area and in the state of Michigan. In the years since, nearly half a billion dollars has been donated to worthy projects and programs in the state. The foundation's offices are located in a building on the grounds of the Dow home and gardens.

== See also ==
- List of Case Western people
