= Greater Midland Community Center =

Recreation center in Michigan

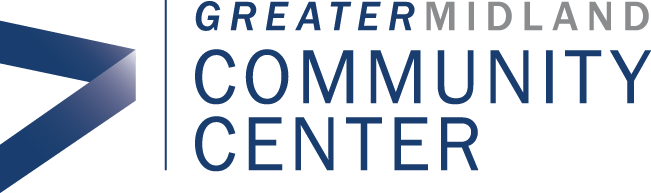
- Interactive map of the Greater Midland Community Center area

General information
- Architectural style: Brutalist
- Location: 2205 Jefferson Ave, Midland, Michigan 48640
- Coordinates: 43.617592°N 84.228015°W
- Year built: 2022-2024
- Groundbreaking: 2022
- Completed: 2024
- Inaugurated: May 15, 2024
- Cost: $58.6 million
- Owner: Greater Midland

Technical details
- Material: Brick
- Floor count: 2
- Floor area: 140,000 sq ft (13,000 m^{2})

Design and construction
- Architecture firm: Barker, Rinker, Seacat Architecture
- Main contractor: Clark Construction

Website
- www.greatermidland.org/community-center

The Greater Midland Community Center is a 140,000 sq ft (13,000 m^{2}) complex on two levels in Midland, Michigan that provides comprehensive, personal, recreational and social development opportunities for residents.

== History ==
The Greater Midland Community Center was founded January 14, 1919, in conjunction with the very first bowling alley in Midland. The community center became a trend-setter, and other sports and pastimes were gradually introduced to the community, including basketball, handball, volleyball, table tennis, pickleball, archery, tennis and softball.

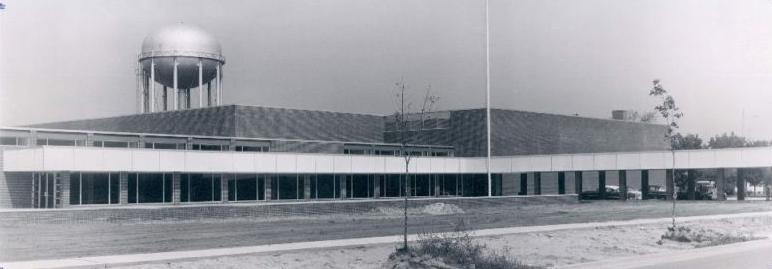
Old Midland Community Center prior to dedication in 1955

The first building at the site of the current center was dedicated on October 30, 1955, and the $1.5 million cost was covered by gifts from the Dow Chemical Company. It has been expanded several times since then. An indoor rifle range was open during the 1960s and classes in marksmanship were offered for air rifle and small-bore rifle. They were discontinued in the early 1970s due to lack of interest. During the summer of 2005, the Greater Midland Community Center locker rooms were completely renovated. The lockers themselves were the originals installed when the center was built and had fifty years of use. In addition to locker replacement, separate family and adult sections were built, the flooring was upgraded and plumbing fixtures were updated. In 2005, the center recorded 900,000 member visits, which is equivalent to 2,465 persons participating in an activity every day of the year.

=== Umbrella structure ===
A new corporation was formed in 2005, the Greater Midland Community Centers, Inc. (today known as Greater Midland), which provides assistance and guidance to five Midland County non-profit recreation centers, including the then Midland Community Center.

Two classrooms at the Greater Midland Community Center received a makeover to become the offices for the Greater Midland personnel. At the same time, Greater Midland announced a $5.1 million fundraising campaign to "enhance the quality of life for Midlanders," according to Greater Midland CEO Chris Tointon. Individuals and businesses contributed to the project, but the majority came from local charitable trusts including the Alden and Vada Dow Family Foundation, the Dow Chemical Company Foundation, the Dow Corning Corporation Foundation, the Herbert H. and Grace A. Dow Foundation, the Midland Area Community Foundation, the Charles J. Strosacker Foundation and the Rollin M. Gerstacker Foundation. The money paid for three projects, but more than half the total was used to create an "outdoor campus" at MCC.

=== Expansion ===
The city averages 141 days each year below freezing, so the Greater Midland Community Center had always concentrated on indoor activities. A$2.5 million expansion in 2008 changed that. Part of the plan involved moving two homes and demolishing a third that was located across the street from the center that occupied land destined to become a new parking area, outdoor running track, outdoor basketball courts and a children's playscape. Walking and biking trails were also created on what is now a 12-acre (4.9 ha) campus.

To accommodate the new amenities, George Street was closed by the city and became the driveway to the new parking lot; the intersection at George and Haley Streets disappeared. A new entrance with a passenger pickup/drop-off was constructed on Jefferson Avenue. The entire project was completed in late 2008.

In 2009, the Greater Midland Community Center celebrated their 90th year of service.

=== New building ===
New Midland Community Center 2025

Following years of planning, construction commenced during the summer of 2022 on the existing Greater Midland Community Center property. A new Greater Midland Community Center opened on May 15, 2024, built at a cost $58.6 million. However, the older structure remained open during construction of the new structure. The 140,000 sq ft (13,000 m^{2}) building features a state-of-the-art fitness center open 24/7; lap & leisure pools; walk/jog track within the multipurpose activity center (MAC) gymnasium; basketball, pickleball and volleyball courts; flexible spaces for golden-agers, events and programming; and dedicated classrooms for early childhood education. The week prior to the opening of the new building, demolition began on the old structure, which became a new parking lot.

== Programs and operations ==
The organization provides the community with a diverse group of activities that include youth and adult classes, drop-in sessions and leagues for athletics. In addition to aquatics, the indoor sports of basketball, volleyball, pickleball, gymnastics and curling are featured. Outdoor sports such as flag football are organized in cooperation with the Midland Parks and Recreation department. Offerings in fine arts are continuously scheduled and include art lessons, voice and/or instrument lessons and dance classes. Specialty fitness activities that are sponsored include fencing, martial arts (karate & judo), Yoga, boxing (non-contact), billiards, table tennis, pickleball and badminton.

=== Deli ===
For the first time in its history, a food service business opened inside the facility in June 2010. The Crossroads Deli was operated by a former resident who received culinary training at The Art Institute of Colorado before returning to Midland. The eatery is now closed.

== Funding ==
The United Way of Midland County provides significant funding for the center's operations. For 2009, UW allocated $282,900 for education programs, $61,500 for self-sufficiency programs and $270,600 for health programs. The total of $615,000 was 16.4% of UWs budget. The Greater Midland Community Center also relies on local companies to underwrite specific programs and free activities.
