= Michigan Molecular Institute =

Scientific institute

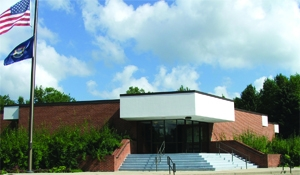
- Successor: Axia Institute
- Formation: 1971July 1, 2015 (aged 42)
- Founder: Michigan Foundation for Advanced Research
- Dissolved: July 1, 2015; 11 years ago
- Type: Non-profit Research Institute
- Registration no.: 38-1787406
- Legal status: defunct
- Headquarters: 1910 West Saint Andrews Road, Midland, Michigan
- Coordinates: 43.6263°N 84.2510°W
- Owner: Herbert H. and Grace A. Dow Foundation
- President & CEO: Dr. James H. Plonka
- Website: https://standrews.msu.edu
- Formerly called: Midland Macromolecular Institute

The Michigan Molecular Institute (MMI) was an advanced polymer research and education organization based in Midland, Michigan which ceased operations in 2015. MMI was founded in 1971 as an independent, nonprofit research and education organization for the purpose of conducting basic and applied research in polymer science and technology. The research focus was primarily on materials science, with specialties in the fields of photonics, membranes, specialty coatings, unique delivery systems, analytical testing and other areas. In later years, the Institute modified its mission statement to emphasize technological development with a commercial orientation in mind. In addition to its research initiatives, MMI served as the launching pad for several spinout businesses, including Dendritech, a commercial dendrimer production facility; Impact Analytical, which provides analytical testing to a wide variety of companies; Oxazogen, a commercialization company in the development and manufacture of coating materials, production of specialty polymers and ongoing polymer research; and the Midland Information Technology Consortium (MITCON), which provides IT services and support to more than 35 non-profit organizations.

== History ==
MMI officially opened its doors under the name Midland Macromolecular Institute in the fall of 1972, although the facility had been in operation for the previous year. The building had broken ground in the spring of 1970, and it, like many of Midland's buildings from that era, was designed by local architect Alden B. Dow, owned by the Herbert H. and Grace A. Dow Foundation. The institute hosted a three-day dedication beginning September 28, 1972 with opening ceremonies that featured more than 400 scientists from throughout the world, chamber music from the Cleveland Quartet, several presentations and public tours. The featured speakers for the ceremonies were Dr. Herman Francis Mark, considered by many to be the father of macromolecular sciences, and Dr. Paul J. Flory, who two years later would be awarded the Nobel Prize for Chemistry. Two other speakers were Prof. Dr. Donald Lyman and Prof. Dr. Edgar Andrews. Other notable attendees included Dr. Melvin Calvin, the 1961 winner of the Nobel Prize for Chemistry; Dr. Charles Overberger, then the vice-president for research at the University of Michigan; and Herbert D. "Ted" Doan, president of the Michigan Foundation for Advanced Research, which was MMI's primary financial backer in its early days.

MMI's first director was Dr. H.G. Elias, who came to Midland from the Swiss Federal Institute of Technology in Zurich. Beyond funding from MFAR, early financial supporters of MMI were the Herbert H. & Grace A. Dow Foundation, the Rollin M. Gerstacker Foundation and the Charles J. Strosacker Foundation. In the institute's early days, Elias said MMI would be run much like a university department, although its founders expected MMI would advance macromolecular science knowledge in a way that universities could not. One similarity: MMI opened its doors as a not-for-profit organization, which it remains today.

MMI's first 15 years of research of advanced composite materials and polymer technology contributed to Michigan's ability to entice plastics- and composite-related industries to build in the state, and its affiliation with Central Michigan University and Michigan Technological University allowed it to offer master's and doctorate degrees in related research fields. In the early 1990s, MMI began to shift its focus toward creating technology that could be licensed for commercialization.

Over the years, six men have led the institute as President and/or CEO, including Elias (1972–83); Dr. Robert E. Hefner (1985-85 and 1990–92); Dr. John Hoffman (1985–1990); Dr. James D. Allen (1992–1994); Dr. Robert M. Nowak (1994–2009); and Dr. James H. Plonka (2009–2015).

== The Turner J. Alfrey Visiting Professorship ==
Year	Turner Alfrey Visiting Professor
1974	George Smets, University of Louvain, Belgium
1975	Motowo Takayanagi, Kyūshū University, Japan
1976	Helmut Ringsdorf, University of Mainz, Germany
1977	Anthony Ledwith, University of Liverpool, England
1978	Ora Kedem, Weizmann Institute of Science, Rehovot, Israel
1979	Bengt Ranby, Royal Institute of Technology, Stockholm, Sweden
1980	Gerard Riess, Upper Alsace University, France
1981	Kenneth O'Driscoll, University of Waterloo, Ontario, Canada
1982	Piero Pino, Swiss Federal Institute of Technology, Zurich, Switzerland
1983	Robert N. Haward, University of Birmingham, England
1984	Joachim Klein, Technical University of Braunschweig, Germany
1985	Norio Ise, Kyoto University, Kyoto, Japan
1986	Robert Gilbert, University of Sydney, Australia
1987	James E. McGrath, Virginia Polytechnic Institute & State University
1988	Robert W. Lenz, University of Massachusetts Amherst
1989	Pierre-Gilles de Gennes, Collège de France, Paris, France
1990	Gerhard Wegner, Max Planck Institute for Polymer Research, Germany
1991	Donald R. Paul, University of Texas, Austin
1992	James Economy, University of Illinois, Urbana-Champaign
1993	Garth L. Wilkes, Virginia Polytechnic Institute and State University
1994	David A. Tirrell, University of Massachusetts Amherst
1995	Christopher W. Macosko, University of Minnesota, Minneapolis
1996	Kenneth B. Wagener, University of Florida, Gainesville
1997	Takeji Hashimoto, Kyoto University, Kyoto, Japan
1998	Bruce M. Novak, University of Massachusetts Amherst
2000	Edwin L. Thomas, Massachusetts Institute of Technology, Cambridge
2001	James E. Mark, University of Cincinnati, Cincinnati
2002	Roderic P. Quirk, The University of Akron, Akron
2003	Matthew Tirrell, University of California, Santa Barbara
2004	Krzysztof Matyjaszewski, Carnegie Mellon University, Pittsburgh
2005	Markus Antonietti, Max Planck Institute of Colloids and Interfaces, Germany
2006	Robert K. Prud’homme, Princeton University
2007	Stephen Z.D. Cheng, The University of Akron, Akron
2008	Thomas P. Russell, University of Massachusetts Amherst
2009	Joseph DeSimone, UNC (Chapel Hill) and NCSU (Raleigh)
2010	Richard A. Gross, New York University, Brooklyn
2011	Timothy P. Lodge, University of Minnesota
2012	Kathryn Uhrich, Rutgers University

The list of Turner Alfrey Visiting Professors includes several Nobel Prize winners. MMI's emphasis from the beginning on the education portion of its mission led to a steady stream of outside experts through the institute, including the visiting professor program, established in 1973 and renamed in 1981 as a living memorial to the late Dr. Turner Alfrey, Jr. Each year, a leading scientist is invited to teach a short course, visit sponsoring organizations and deliver additional research seminars, benefitting many people by providing a point of connection between local scientists and engineers with the world leaders of the polymer science field.

TAVP speakers from around the world have been invited to present the latest, most up-to-date information in their particular polymer expertise areas. Typically, these courses were delivered in an intensive, one-week, daily lecture format. Visiting professors also spent additional time at MMI, participating in one-on-one and research group discussions at the Institute, and in collaborations and discussions with other nearby industrial and academic researchers. They also prepared and delivered a set of on-site seminars for many of the sponsoring organizations that parallel and supplement the formal course lectures. Financial co-sponsors of the Turner Alfrey Visiting Professor program included The Dow Chemical Company, Dow Corning Corporation, Michigan State University, Central Michigan University, Saginaw Valley State University, the Mid-Michigan Section of the Society of Plastics Engineers, and the Midland Section of the American Chemical Society.

== Structure ==
The $1.7 million facility is arranged in a circle around a central research library from which 13 laboratories and 14 offices radiate. All the laboratories connect with the others and contain a corner floor to ceiling window. There is also a seminar room, lecture hall, cafeteria, recreation room and computer lab. Visiting scientists can utilize the four-room apartment. Dow believed that the interconnectivity would encourage sharing and discoveries.

== End of operations ==
An industry funding change in 2015 made it nearly impossible to obtain government contracts that were fundamental to their operations, so MMI closed down July 1, 2015. At the time, the Midland Daily News reported that Michigan State University planned to use it to prepare teachers to for STEM education. Subsequently, the Axia Institute began using the building.

== Axia ==
The Axia Institute was established in 2013 by Michigan State University as a foremost authority on value chains. The program's founders came from the Eli Broad College of Business, the Colleges of Social Science, Engineering, Agriculture & Natural Resources and the Packaging school. The goal of their work is to improve both private and public value chains using education, research and outreach. They work with food & agriculture, healthcare and manufacturing industries to provide solutions to complex problems. Their website states that "Axia has a broad portfolio of competencies to look holistically at the entire supply chain and focus on delivering products or services to the end customer as efficiently as possible." The institute can connect with other faculty members who are nationally known and top academic programs through the MSU Office of Research and Innovation to develop solutions.

The institute announced in November 2022 that their offices were moving to the former Michigan Molecular Institute building in Discovery Square, Midland. Their laboratories began there in September 2021, and the relocation was expected to be complete by January 1, 2023. Support for the facility and programs was provided by Midland benefactors: Herbert H. and Grace A. Dow Foundation, the Rollin M. Gerstacker Foundation, the Charles J. Strosacker Foundation, and the Dow Chemical Company Foundation.
