= K-Dow Petrochemicals =

- Company type: Joint Venture
- Industry: Petrochemical Manufacturing
- Headquarters: Michigan, United States
- Key people: Jim Fitterling, CEO
- Products: Polyethylene, Ethylenediamines, Ethanolamines, Polypropylene, and Polycarbonate

K-Dow Petrochemicals was a planned $17.4 billion joint venture between The Dow Chemical Company and Petrochemical Industries Company (PIC) of the State of Kuwait, a wholly owned subsidiary of Kuwait Petroleum Corporation (KPC). A joint venture between the two companies was signed in July 2008. However, critics to the deal from members of the Kuwaiti parliament lead to its collapse in December 2008. Dow sued PIC and was awarded over $2 bn damages by a non-governmental court in 2012.

== History ==
=== Formation ===
K-Dow Petrochemicals was to be a multinational corporation specializing in the manufacturing of plastics. It was an $11 billion joint venture between The Dow Chemical Company and Petrochemical Industries Company (PIC) of the State of Kuwait, a wholly owned subsidiary of Kuwait Petroleum Corporation (KPC). On July 15, 2008, the two companies announced the location of their headquarters was to be in Southeast Michigan. In the third quarter 2008 earnings conference call, Dow Chemical officials stated the K-Dow joint venture was on track to close by the end of the year. On December 1, 2008, the two companies announced that they had signed a memorandum of understanding outlining agreed-upon details about the joint venture. The transactions was expected to close on January 1, 2009. Operations were expected to begin on that same date.

=== Breakup ===
Citing the global recession that begin in the later half of 2008, the Kuwaiti government scuttled the partnership prior to its launch on December 28, 2008.

Dow currently has arbitration pending against KPC. The original MOU had a damages clause that allowed for damaged up to $2.5 Billion. Dow Chemical has stated the damages they are seeking may be in excess of that amount.

== Subsidiaries ==
As a part of the Joint-Venture formation two of Dow Chemical's current joint-ventures with Kuwait Petroleum Corporation were to be transferred to K-Dow.

- Equipolymers
- MEGlobal
