= Greater Midland =

Coordinates: 43°37′03″N 84°13′45″W

Greater Midland, Inc.
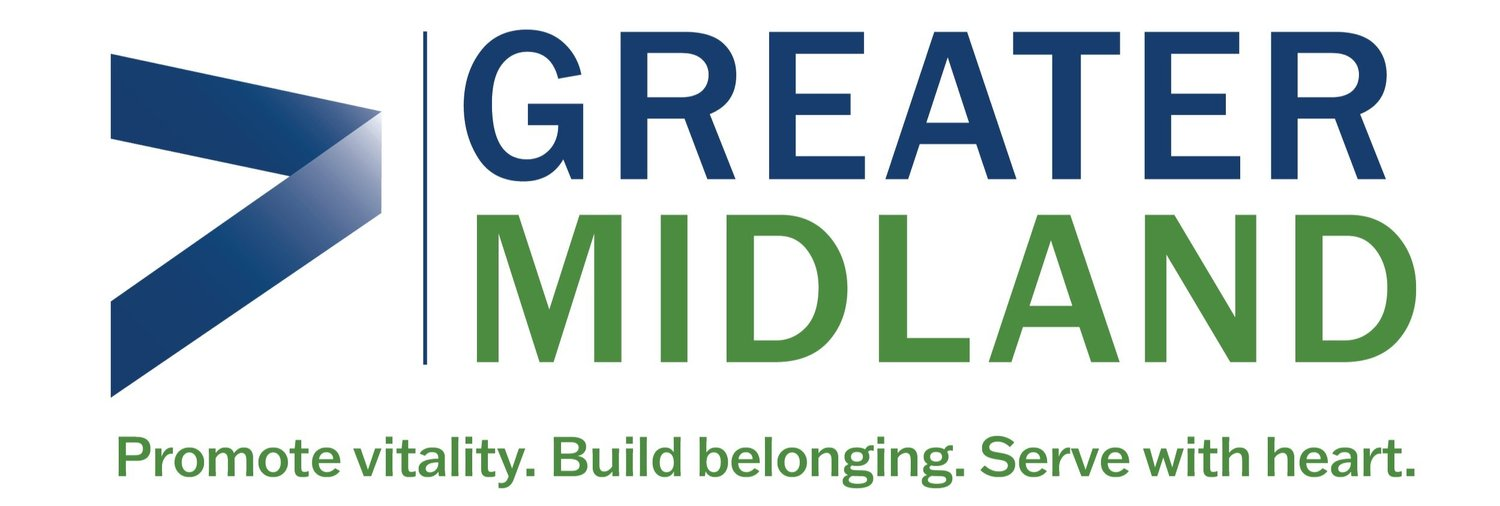
- Company type: Non-Profit
- Industry: Recreation
- Founded: 2005 (Midland)
- Headquarters: Midland, Michigan
- Area served: Midland County, Michigan
- Key people: Terri Johnson, CEO; Paul Barbeau, Board Chair
- Products: Administration
- Website: www.greatermidland.org

The Greater Midland, Inc. (previously known as Greater Midland Community Centers, Inc.) is a non-profit corporation in Midland, Michigan, founded in 2005 to provide guidance and assistance to five existing non-profit family and recreation centers in Midland County.

== Reasons for creation ==
Greater Midland is responsible for long-range and capital planning, executive staffing, human resources, financial office and accounting, computer technology, and major fundraising for the five units under the Greater Midland corporate umbrella. By centralizing these business functions and services, each center's director is freed to concentrate on programming, membership, and customer service. Additionally, each center is able to share personnel with the other centers, and request staffing assistance from the other centers for special events.

Two unused classrooms at the Greater Midland Community Center received a makeover to become the offices for Greater Midland personnel in 2007.

== Organizations ==
- Greater Midland Community Center - the oldest and largest of the centers; memberships as of March, 2009 was just under 4,000 which comprise 7,000 individuals.
- North Midland Family Center - programs target the needs of local residents and include pre-school, daycare, social services, fitness (including Karate), computer literacy and Senior Adult activities
- Railway Family Center - in 2008, programs were expanded and the new fitness center use soared; the center moved to the old middle school building on Railway Street. Formerly Coleman Community Network. The childcare and preschool programs were always popular, but the new aerobics classes, teen center, food pantry and after-school activities have high participation
- Midland Curling Club - founded in 1962 by eleven members and their sheets were outside; the 16,000 sq ft (1,500 m^{2}) Midland Curling Center opened October 31, 2008 and has four sheets for 120 members There are only two other Curling clubs in the state of Michigan.
- Midland Community Tennis Center - opened in 1974 with 700 members sharing six courts; it now counts 3,000+ members with 16 indoor plus 16 outdoor courts It is the largest facility in the Midwest devoted exclusively to tennis.

== First projects ==
Shortly after Greater Midland was created, they announced a $5.1 million fundraising campaign to "enhance the quality of life for Midlanders," according to Greater Midland CEO Chris Tointon. Individuals and businesses contributed to the project, but the majority came from local charitable trusts including the Alden and Vada Dow Family Foundation, the Dow Chemical Company Foundation, the Dow Corning Corporation Foundation, the Herbert H. and Grace A. Dow Foundation, the Midland Area Community Foundation, the Charles J. Strosacker Foundation and the Rollin M. Gerstacker Foundation.

The money paid for three projects. The Midland Community Tennis Center received an overdue renovation of existing facilities and an expansion. The Midland Curling Club was relocated to a newly constructed building near the Greater Midland Community Center. Lastly, the Greater Midland Community Center created an "outdoor campus".

== Funding ==
The United Way of Midland County provides significant funding for three of Greater Midland's centers. For 2009, UW allocated $282,900 for education programs, $61,500 for self-sufficiency programs and $270,600 for health programs. The total of $615,000 was 16.4% of UWs budget. Greater Midland also relies on local companies to underwrite specific programs and free activities.
