= Hohagen =

Hohagen is a surname. Notable people with the surname include:

- Alexandre Hohagen, Brazilian business executive
- Erich Hohagen (1915–1990), German fighter pilot and general
