= James T. Pardee House =

- U.S. National Register of Historic Places
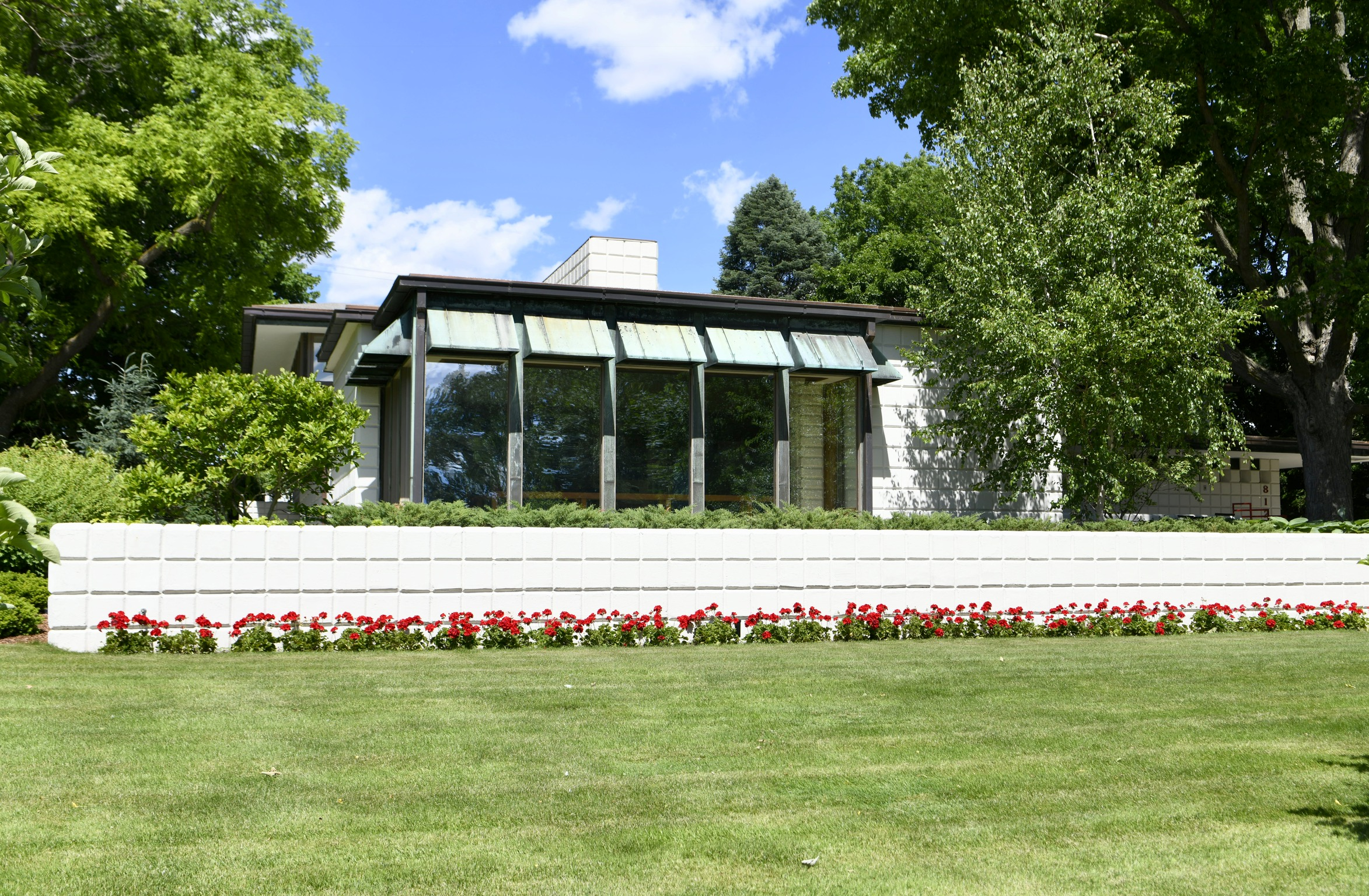
- Interactive map
- Location: 812 W. Main St., Midland, Michigan
- Coordinates: 43°37′09″N 84°15′06″W
- Area: less than one acre
- Built: 1936
- Architect: Alden B. Dow
- Architectural style: International Style
- MPS: Residential Architecture of Alden B. Dow in Midland 1933--1938 MPS
- NRHP reference No.: 89001431
- Added to NRHP: December 4, 1989

The James T. Pardee House is a single-family home located at 812 West Main Street in Midland, Michigan. It was listed on the National Register of Historic Places in 1989.

== History ==
James T. Pardee was a college classmate of Herbert H. Dow, and when Dow organized the Dow Chemical Company in 1897, Pardee became a member of the board of directors. In 1935, Pardee was elected chairman of the board at Dow Chemical Company. James and his wife decided to replace an older home located on Main Street with a more modern residence, and selected architect Alden B. Dow to design the structure. It was Dow's largest commission up to that date. Dow completed the initial drawings in January, 1936. Dow and the Pardees made multiple changes to the house plans, and construction began in the middle of 1937, and was substantially completed by spring of the next year. Dow designed an addition in 1953. In 1985, the Pardee House was purchased by the Rollin M. Gerstacker Foundation, who restored the house in 1986.

== Description ==
The James T. Pardee House is a broad, T-shaped dwelling with horizontal lines, constructed of unit block. It has large windows with vertical wooden mullions, above which are copper awnings. Other elevations have a course of glass block and a narrow course of windows. The house is divided into sections, with the entryway at the intersection of two of the sections, sheltered by an overhanging eave. The entrance is approached by unit block stairs, which wrap around at the corner and taper away.
