= Midland Curling Club =

There are at least two curling clubs known as Midland Curling Club.

- Midland Curling Club (Ontario), a curling club in Ontario's Zone 10
- Midland Curling Club (Michigan), a curling club in Midland, Michigan
