= Carl Gerstacker =

American chemical industrialist (1897–1949)

- Born: Carl Allan Gerstacker; August 6, 1916; Cleveland, Ohio, U.S.
- Died: April 23, 1995 (aged 78); Midland, Michigan, U.S.
- Education: University of Michigan
- Known for: expanding Dow Chemical Company; philanthrophy
- Spouse(s): Jayne Harris Cunningham (m. 1950) Esther Cathrin Schuette (m. 1976)
- Children: 2+3
- Awards: Chemical Industry Medal (1946); Outstanding Achievement Award (1982) University of Michigan; Alumni Society Medal (1992) UM College of Engineering
- Scientific career
- Fields: Chemical engineering

Carl Gerstacker (August 6, 1916 – April 23, 1995) was an American chemical industrialist and philanthropist who expanded the American multinational conglomerate Dow Chemical. A graduate of the University of Michigan, he served on Dow's board of directors for 34 years, 17 as chairman. He also shared his knowledge and experience by serving on boards of dozens of civic organizations and corporations.

== Early years ==
Carl Gerstacker was born in Cleveland, Ohio, in 1916. He was the younger of two children of Rollin Gerstacker, an engineer at a boat machinery manufacturer, and his wife, Edna Helen Uhinck. From age 5, Carl and sister Elsa spent their summers in Midland, Michigan with their Aunt Elsa and Uncle James. At the time, James Pardee was chairman of the board at Dow Chemical.

From his early years his father ingrained a sense of business, with interest in the stock market. Gerstacker saved money earned from a paper route and other jobs in a bank account. In 1930, his father urged him to invest his savings in the Dow Chemical Company, which he did.

== Business ==
After graduating from Lincoln High School in 1934, Gerstacker moved to Midland, living with his aunt and uncle. James T. Pardee was a college classmate of Herbert H. Dow, and when Dow organized the Dow Chemical Company in 1897, Pardee became a member of the board of directors. Gerstacker was hired as a lab assistant at Dow Chemical and enrolled at the University of Michigan through Dow's employee education program. He also joined Reserve Officers' Training Corps to get paid 20¢ per day. Gerstacker commented, "Twenty cents a day was good stuff. When I graduated, I was a second lieutenant in the reserves. I made up my mind to resign as soon as I could, but you couldn't resign immediately."

=== War ===
Gerstacker returned to work at Dow for $115/month while his active-duty training as a reserve officer continued as required. His degree was in chemical engineering, he was assigned to work as an auditor at Dowell, a Dow subsidiary that serviced oil wells. The country was experiencing a small recession at the time, so he did as asked. His supervisor constantly reminded him to be accurate and analyze everything carefully. At the time, he also wondered if people were nice because he did a good job or because he was the nephew of the chairman. He viewed his army duty as an opportunity where no one knew him and he would be judged on his own merit. In late 1940, he had saved enough money to purchase a car, but he could be called to active duty at any time. He contacted the Army to ask when to expect active duty and was told to report to the Detroit Ordnance District as soon as he was available, so a few weeks later he arrived in Detroit. On December 11, 1940, the colonel in charge noted his ROTC ordnance training and announced, "You're going to be an artillery expert."

However, his training would not start until mid-February, so he was sent to Battle Creek, Michigan. Duplex Printing Press Company was a nearly bankrupt company that had a contract to manufacture 37mm cartridges for overseas but missed multiple scheduled deadlines. Gerstacker's financial and organizational skills were critical when he reorganized their top management for the supervision of 500 workers. He was in charge of teaching workers their jobs and making certain everything was done correctly. A few days before February 15, 1941, he left Michigan for Illinois and reported at Rock Island Arsenal for six-weeks of training to be an Army ordnance inspector. After he completed training, he returned to Battle Creek, but in April 1941, he contracted the measles and spent several weeks under quarantine at Fort Custer.

He was promoted to First Lieutenant on June 20, 1941, after his release. Gerstacker continued his work at Duplex, but the ordnance department in Detroit recognized him as a troubleshooter and required him to commute regularly between Battle Creek and Detroit. After a year at Duplex, they received the "E"-excellence Award as a military supplier. He wanted to join the fight overseas, but the Army considered him too valuable where he was. In late October, he was promoted to Chief of Artillery Division in Detroit, responsible for 100 ordnance inspectors across Michigan doing what he had done at Duplex. He not only traveled throughout Michigan, but who were imbedded in businesses making war equipment like he had been. This required him to not only travel throughout the state but also Massachusetts, Washington, D.C. and Ohio.

In May 1942, he received a promotion to captain and was ordered to supervise manufacturers of 37mm, 57m, 75mm and 3-inch mobile artillery carriages. He was also assigned to a Industry Integrating Committee to facilitate cooperation between companies manufacturing similar equipment. Gerstacker explained, "If one company was short of something, another company could help them out. If one company could make a part better, that company would make that part in order to push out more stuff and do it better." This collaboration made a tremendous difference in war production.

Gerstacker relocated to Reading, Pennsylvania in January 1943, to work with Parrish Pressed Steel and other companies in the Philadelphia Ordnance District. He received an education in administration by working collaboratively with geographically diverse companies from Maine to Louisiana to Saskatchewan. He occasionally worked eleven-hour shifts alongside the men repairing artillery.

In June 1943 he was sent to a manufacturing plant that "in trouble" with an impossible problem for him to resolve. He constantly found himself on a train or driving throughout the Midwest and east coast. He wrote home, "…seems like everything I work on is an extreme emergency." The company leaders typically received credit for their achievements, but one company wrote to the brass, "We very much appreciated the assistance given us by Captain Gerstacker who truly worked hard on this project and deserves much credit for its being accomplished on time."

Gerstacker felt guilty about not being in the fight because of his status: "young, healthy, and single" Letters from home talked about his married friends being sent overseas. In November 1943, he went for training at Maryland's Aberdeen Proving Ground to prepare for field duty. Overalls were required for the work and drills were held every day. He wrote home, "I’ve learned a lot. Am afraid my chances of going overseas were not very good. They have a lot of officers doing nothing but waiting for an assignment and many more who could be more easily replaced than I and who are better trained for field duty." His superiors rejected his request for overseas duty, so he headed back to Pennsylvania.

In early 1944, he was assigned to the Chicago Ordnance District as a field representative. On May 30, 1944, he was sent to New York City Ordnance Department for the rest of the war. He worked in the Bronx with R. Hoe Company. The company had developed special methods to assemble carriages. Gerstacker worked on the Major Caliber Anti-Aircraft Carriage Industry Integration Committee as the ordnance representative. He authored a report on their work which was historical.

Early in 1945, frustrated by promotion delays, Gerstacker spoke to a general who said, "he would make me major tomorrow if he had vacancies — said my efficiency report was highest he had ever seen." After hospitalization for pneumonia in May, Gerstacker received the promotion to major on June 1, 1945. Two months later he returned to Washington, D.C. as a special assistant. Two weeks after the war ended, Gerstacker began a six-month assignment to instruct employees at Boston's Arthur D. Little Company on artillery. They were contracted to create a storage plan for World War II artillery for another war.

=== Post-war ===
Gerstacker considered making a career in the Army; he could retire after another twelve years. However, he received a letter from Stephen Starks, Dow's director of technical employment offering re-employment, and he liked the company.

He began Army terminal leave in February and was discharged as a major on May 5, 1946. He resumed work in his old Dow job and transferred to the purchasing department as an expeditor in August. He began using the skills gained during his military service and retired from the Army reserves on April 1, 1953. Elsa and James Pardee both died in 1944, and their house passed to Eda, Carl Gerstacker's mother, who was still living in Cleveland. He ascended the corporate ladder quickly, added to Dow's board of directors in 1948 and named company assistant treasurer in 1949.

=== Family ===
On October 22, 1950, he married Jayne Harris Cunningham, society reporter for the Midland Daily News. Gerstacker purchased the Pardee House from his mother for their home. The couple had two children: Bette (1951) and Lisa (1955).

=== Executive ===
He was named vice-president in 1955 and joined Dow's executive committee the following year. Gerstacker was named chairman of the board in 1960. Ted Doan succeeded Leland Doan as Dow President and CEO in 1962. Doan formed a management trioka with Gerstacker responsible for finance and marketing; Ben Branch in charge of international business and manufacturing; and Doan managing everything else. The three met every other week on Monday mornings. Once each year they would retreat for a week to determine company strategy for the next year and evaluate all 300 senior managers. Upon their return, and personnel changes were effected. Doan relinquished the presidency in 1971, and Ben Branch became president and CEO.

=== Retirement ===
Ted Doan and Gerstacker believed that competent younger employees should be placed in senior positions because they have the new ideas and energy to advance the company. They established a policy that presidents, CEOs and board chairpersons must relinquish their post at age 60 and retire from the company at 65. The five-year period became known as "deceleration". Gerstacker remained chairman until 1976, when he was required to become an inside board member. Five years later, in 1981, he retired.

== Personal ==
Gerstacker married Esther Little Schuette in 1975 and gained three grown stepchildren including Bill Schuette, Michigan politician, judge and attorney general. Esther was a lifelong philanthropist, so they made a great team. Gerstacker was quoted,

It would be a mistake for foundations to give money to do big projects without the support of people. This is why we make a lot of challenge grants, because unless the whole community involves themselves in giving, they won't become a part of it. People should do good deeds because it's the right thing to do. You'll be much happier to give money to society and see it used while you are still alive.

=== Tridge ===
The confluence of the Chippewa and Tittabawassee River occurs near downtown Midland, Michigan. There are parks and trails on each side of the river, so the public requested the areas be connected. A plan was developed to construct a multi-way bridge at the urging of Carl and Esther Gerstacker. The Midland Area Community Foundation (MACF) issued a matching challenge grant of $366,000 to the community. School-aged children staged creative fundraising events and solicited donations to collect $368,000. The Tridge opened to the public in 1981.

=== Death ===
After battling leukemia since the early 1990s, Gerstacker died April 23, 1995, at his home in Midland. He followed his mother's example and donated most of his wealth to the Rollin M. Gerstacker Foundation. He had intended to donate all his money before he died.

== Summary ==
Gerstacker believed that companies have personalities, and Dow's employees shaped theirs. Gerstacker said, "For Dow Chemical, people are the most important asset, not the patents, the plants, nor the products." He had excellent judgment and made quick decisions that resulted in the consistent, stable corporate growth of Dow. He loved the company and devoted most of his life to it at the expense of his first family. Gerstacker was a giant in American industry in the twentieth century. He appeared on the cover of Business Week magazine in 1961 with the caption, "Dow Chemical looks to a young management led by Carl A. Gerstacker to make the most of its new products." "Ted Doan, Charles "Ben" Branch and Gerstacker led the company through an explosive time of geographic growth in the '60s and '70s. He was a very principled manager with high standards," according to Frank Popoff, CEO of Dow from 1987 to 1995.

=== Corporate involvement ===
- Kmart, board member
- Sara Lee, board member
- Eaton Corp., board member
- Chemical Financial Corp., board member
- Carrier Corporation, board member
- Dundee Cement Company, board member
- ConRail, board member 1976
- Consolidated Foods Corporation, board member
- Hartford Insurance Group, board member
- National City Corporation, board member
- Spence Engineering Company, board member

=== Civic involvement ===
- 33rd Degree Mason Knights Templar (Freemasonry) for exceptional leadership, dedication and service.
- Trustee Michigan Molecular Institute
- Trustee and chairman, Albion College
- Board member, Midland Downtown Development Authority
- Secretary-Treasurer, Midland Hospital Association 1953-1961
- Board member, Masters and Johnson Institute
- First treasurer, Nature Conservancy, Michigan chapter
- Chairman, Michigan State Mental Health Society 1963-1967
- Board member, Federal Reserve Bank of Chicago, Detroit branch 1960-1963
- Board member, Chemical Bank and Trust Company, Midland
- Founding member, Rollin M. Gerstacker Foundation 1957
- Co-founder, Midland Area Community Foundation
- President, Dow Employees Credit Union 1949
- Board member and President Midland Red Cross chapter 1949
- Board member and President Midland Rotary Club 1949
- Garfield Society member, Hiram College
- Book of Golden Deeds Award, Midland Exchange Club
- Order of Industrial Service Merit Silver Tower, Government of South Korea
- Second Order of the Rising Sun, Emperor Hirohito
- Board Chairman, Manufacturing Chemists Association
- Special Medal, United States Department of Commerce
- Chairman, National Export Expansion Council, 1965-73

=== Tributes ===
- The Carl A. Gerstacker Nature Preserve is 879 acres at Dudley Bay on M-134 near Cedarville, Michigan. The tract, located in Michigan's upper peninsula, includes five miles of cobbled lakeshore, two small islands in four bays on Lake Huron and a large section of mixed hardwood forest with two creeks plus Big and Little Trout Lakes. There are also conifer swamps plus interdunal wetlands. The trails are maintained and marked. The preserve, managed by The Nature Conservancy, supports migratory birds and protects animal species and endangered plants.
- The Carl A Gerstacker Building on the University of Michigan campus contains almost 5,000 sq ft (460 m^{2}) of space for the Gerstacker research labs. Research in the Biomedical Ultrasonic lab includes imaging. The Takayama lab features micro and nano molecular biotechnology. The Bio-fluid Mechanics lab focuses on lung research, including artificial lung development.
- The Carl A Gerstacker Commerce Center is an 11,400 sq ft (1,060 m^{2}) building in Midland, Michigan constructed in 1996 in honor of the late businessman and philanthropist. It was funded by the Rollin M. Gerstacker Foundation and is home to the Midland Business Alliance (MBA), the business hub of Midland County. After 25 years of service, the structure needed renovation, which began May 15, 2023. The project was budgeted at $3.9 million and was expected to be completed in 2024. An open house and ribbon cutting was held on May 1, 2025, to celebrate completion of the major renovation lasting nearly two years. The targeted upgrades included HVAC system, lobby and reception area, first floor meeting room, building security, parking lot enhancements for storm drainage and a new roof.
- The Gerstacker Business Institute is a facility at Albion College prepares students for the business world. Students network with visiting executives, attain business and leadership skills from off-campus study and internships. Opportunities are available at nonprofit organizations, major corporations, start-ups, small businesses and accounting firms.
- The Gerstacker Bridge is an international bridge that crosses the Rio Grande River in the Big Bend region of Texas. The single-lane structure was built by Dow Chemical in 1964 to truck fluorite from Coahuila mines to the U.S. The unmonitored bridge was closed in 1997 for suspected smuggling, but litigation is proceeding to reopen it because it's nearly 400 miles (640 km) between the Presidio–Ojinaga and Del Rio–Acuña crossing stations.
- The Gerstacker Building is a physician's office building on the campus of Midland's Hospital, MyMichigan Medical Center, a 501-c-3 organization.
- The Carl A. Gerstacker Fair Center is the prominent structure at the Midland County Fairgrounds, built in 1990. The Gerstacker foundation also funded a two-year renovation project in 2023 to "freshen-up" the building.

=== Awards ===
- Chemical Industry Medal, 1946 Society of Chemical Industry
- Outstanding Achievement Award, 1982 University of Michigan
- Alumni Society Medal, 1992 from UM College of Engineering
- Honorary Doctor of Laws degree, 1993 University of Michigan
