= Gerstacker =

Gerstacker, Gerstäcker or Gerstaecker is a German surname. Notable people with the surname include:

- Carl Gerstacker (1916–1995), American chemical industrialist and philanthropist
- Carl Eduard Adolph Gerstaecker (1828–1895), German zoologist and entomologist
- Friedrich Gerstäcker (1816–1872), German traveler and novelist
- Georg Gerstäcker (1889–1949), German wrestler
