= Romeo Kreinberg =

- Occupation: Business executive

Romeo Kreinberg is an American–German business executive and former executive vice president for Performance Plastics & Chemicals at the Dow Chemical Company. Kreinberg was instrumental in the Fortune 100 company's reorganization in the 2000s. He is chairman of Befesa, an industrial waste manager and recycler, and Rain Carbon a manufacturer of chemical raw materials made from coal tar. Kreinberg is also a director of Orion Engineered Carbons and a former director of Dow Corning.

== Career ==
Kreinberg joined the Dow Chemical Company in 1977 after graduating from National University of Architecture and City Planning of Buenos Aires. He became marketing director of Dow Deutschland in 1991 and took the same position at Dow Italia in 1993. In 1995, Kreinberg became Dow's global vice president for polyethylene and PET/PTA. He became president of the company's polyethylene, polypropylene, and PET business in 2000. Dow Chemicals went through a reorganization in 2003, and Kreinberg became the head of its new Plastics division, which covered its polypropylene, PET, polystyrene, engineering thermoplastics, fabricated products, automotive, wire and cable, and rubber and elastomers businesses. Shortly thereafter, in January 2004, Kreinberg was appointed vice president of the company's polyethylene business in addition to his role as senior vice president of the Plastics division.

Dow Chemicals reorganized again in 2005, and consolidated all of its businesses into two divisions: Basic Plastics & Chemicals and Performance Plastics & Chemicals. Kreinberg was appointed to lead the Performance Plastics & Chemicals division as its executive vice president. Later that year Kreinberg was appointed to the board of directors of Dow Corning.

Kreinberg was appointed to Dow Chemical's executive leadership committee in 2007. The executive leadership committee replaced Dow's Office of the Chief Executive, which Kreinberg joined in 2004. He left the Dow Chemical Company later that year.

== Personal life ==
Kreinberg is a graduate of The National University of Architecture and City Planning in Buenos Aires. He is fluent in six languages.
