= Leland Doan =

American chemical industrialist (1894–1974)

- Leland Doan, president of Dow Chemical Company
- Born: Leland Ira Doan; November 9, 1894; North Bend, Nebraska, U.S.
- Died: April 4, 1974 (aged 79); Midland, Michigan, U.S.
- Education: University of Michigan
- Known for: expanding Dow Chemical Company worldwide
- Spouse: Ruth Alden Dow (m. 1917)
- Children: 3
- Parents: Ira Doan (father); Hester S Spencer (mother)
- Awards: Chemical Industry Medal, 1964
- Scientific career
- Fields: Chemical & product sales

Leland "Lee" Doan was a businessman and member of the Dow family that served as president and CEO of the Dow Chemical Company. Doan led the company from 1949 to 1962 and transformed Dow from a firm that made chemicals for other companies into a familiar name and one of the world's largest chemical conglomerates.

== Early years ==
Doan was born in 1894 in North Bend, Nebraska. He was the youngest of three boys of Ira Doan, a physician and surgeon, and his wife, Hester Spencer. His middle brother died at age 3 before Leland was born, and his father had a heart attack and died when Leland was 7. The mother and boys moved to Ann Arbor, Michigan where his older brother Wilson was enrolled at the University of Michigan (UM). Doan graduated from Ann Arbor High School and enrolled at UM where he met Ruth Alden Dow, also a student at UM. She was the daughter of Dow Chemical Company founder Herbert Henry Dow. They married in 1917 and Doan left school early for a job with Dow. The couple had three children: Leland Alden Jr (1918), Dorothy M. "Honey" (1921) and Herbert Dow "Ted" (1922). Doan joined the sales department and discovered that all sales were the responsibility of a handful of individuals. To expand sales he established branch offices with numerous salesmen for each company specialty. To promote sales, he collected data on prospective customers, including hobbies. Over the years, he moved up the management ladder, developing markets and customers for new products in plastics and pharmaceuticals. He was promoted to General Sales Manager in 1929 and named a company director in 1935. In 1938 he became a vice-president and three years later, corporate secretary.

== Business ==
Dow President and CEO Willard Dow, Doan's brother-in-law, died in an airplane crash on March 31, 1949. Leland Doan was named Dow president; Earl Bennett, father-in-law of Willard's brother Alden B. Dow became board chairman; general manager was Dr. Mark Putnam; Calvin Campbell was named secretary and Carl Gerstacker was selected as treasurer.

Leland Doan became president of Dow in 1949.

Doan created Dow's biggest product diversification and expanded their markets. Department heads were given more authority, and he expanded his sales force and trained them to analyze their markets and the production process. A news release announced $25 million for expansion into plastic products. New facilities were planned for 1951 with a $100 million budget.

== Retirement ==
Leland Doan reached Dow's mandatory retirement age in 1962 and stepped aside for his son, Ted Doan to take over. During Doan's 13 years at the helm, employment at Dow more than doubled to 31,000 from 14,000, and sales soared to $890 million from $200 million.

== Personal ==
His wife Ruth died of a heart attack at age 54 while the couple was in New York City on January 21, 1950. Doan married Mildred "Millie" Mellus on December 20, 1950, in Atherton, California. Doan asked Alden Dow, his brother-in-law to create a new home that could be used for corporate entertaining as well as being comfortable for his wife and him. It was 1956, business was booming and the nation was prospering. The resulting house was stunning and later featured in the September 1962 House Beautiful magazine titled, "How a corporation president built to entertain." Both of his sons worked for Dow and were very successful. After a long illness, Doan died April 4, 1974, at that home in Midland, Michigan. He was 79.

== Board memberships ==
- Dow Corning, board chairman
- Michigan Bell Telephone Company, board member
- National Bank of Detroit, board member
- Board of Regents for the University of Michigan, regent
- National Industrial Conference Board, trustee
- Armed Services Chemical Association, board member
- Health Information Association, board member
- Bendix Corporation, board member
- Society of Chemical Industry, secretary

== Awards and honors ==
- Chemical Industry Medal, 1964
- Cleary College, Honorary doctorate
- Case Institute of Technology, Honorary doctorate
- Kalamazoo College, Honorary doctorate
- Central Michigan University, Honorary doctorate
- Alma College, Honorary doctorate
- Findlay College, Honorary doctorate
- Northwood Institute, Honorary doctorate
- Earlham College, Honorary doctorate
- Doan Center at Saginaw Valley State University
