= Ruth G. Shaw =

Former President and CEO of Duke Energy Corporation

- Born: February 19, 1948 (age 78); Danville, Virginia, U.S.
- Education: East Carolina University, University of Texas at Austin
- Employer: Duke Energy

Ruth Gwynn Shaw (born February 19, 1948, Danville, Virginia) is a former president and CEO of Duke Energy Corporation. In addition to her career at Duke, she holds and has held many other civic and business positions.

== Education ==
Shaw received her B.A. and M.A. Degrees in English from East Carolina University and a Ph.D. in Higher Educational Administration from the University of Texas at Austin.

== Career ==
Shaw was President of El Centro College in Dallas, Texas (1984-1986). She then became president of Central Piedmont Community College (1986 to 1992).

In September 1992, Shaw joined the Duke Power Company (later Duke Energy) as Vice President of Corporate Communications. She held a variety of senior positions at Duke during her career including, President of Duke Nuclear in 2006, and CEO and President of Duke Power Company from 2003 to 2006. Shaw retired from Duke in April 2007, but served as an Executive Advisor until April 2009.

== Appointments ==
In addition to past appointments, Shaw is currently an independent director at Wells Fargo (as of 1990), Dow Chemical Company (2005), the DTE Energy Company (2008), and the SPX Corporation (2015). She is part of the Environment, Health, Safety and Technology Committee at Dow.

She is also a chairwoman of the University of North Carolina at Charlotte and a director of the Foundation For The Carolinas.

== UNC Charlotte ==
Shaw has a history of involvement at the University of North Carolina at Charlotte. She has been a director of the Board of Trustees for UNC Charlotte, and a supporter of the Carolina Thread Trail. The Ruth G. Shaw Trail on Toby Creek Greenway, which the UNC Charlotte campus and the Mallard Creek Greenway, has been named in her honor.
