= Ted Doan =

American chemical industrialist (1922–2006)

- Ted Doan, president of Dow Chemical Company
- Born: Herbert Dow Doan; September 5, 1922; Midland, Michigan, U.S.
- Died: May 16, 2006 (aged 83); Ann Arbor, Michigan, U.S.
- Education: Cornell University
- Known for: expanding Dow Chemical Company worldwide
- Spouse(s): Donalda "Donnie" Lockwood (m. 1946) Anna Junia Cassell (m. 1975)
- Children: 4+1
- Parents: Leland Ira Doan (father); Ruth Alden Dow (mother)
- Scientific career
- Fields: Chemical engineering

Ted Doan was a businessman, philanthropist and the last member of the Dow family that served as president and CEO of the Dow Chemical Company. Doan led the company from 1962-71 and transformed Dow from a firm that made chemicals for other companies into one of the most widely known and one of the world’s largest chemical conglomerates. Doan was a strong supporter of entrepreneurship and was chairman of the Herbert H. and Grace A. Dow Foundation, founded in his grandparents' honor.

== Early years ==
Doan was born in 1922 in Midland, Michigan. He was the youngest of three children of Leland Ira Doan, general sales manager at Dow, and his wife, Ruth Alden Dow, daughter of the founder of Dow, Herbert H. Dow, after whom he was named. He was always called Ted because his grandfather's name was "too much to hang on a kid" Doan recalled. Doan attended elementary school in Midland before boarding at Cranbrook Academy, then enrolled at Cornell University. Following the December Attack on Pearl Harbor, Doan enlisted in the United States Army Air Corps and served as a meteorologist in World War II. When the conflict ended, he returned to Cornell and graduated in 1949 with a chemical engineering degree.

== Business ==
Doan returned to Midland and was hired at Dow just weeks before Willard Dow, his uncle, died in an airplane crash. Ted's father, Leland Doan, was named Dow president. Ted Doan rapidly climbed the company ladder and followed his father, becoming president just thirteen years later when he was 40 years old.

Doan immediately integrated disparate company branches to create an efficient organization focused on growth and expansion outside the U.S. His goal was to increase company earnings 10% each year. Dow sales surpassed $1 billion in 1964.

Doan began an open-door policy for employees, placed higher emphasis on research, and held the attitude that their employees were the company's strength. Those policies continued after Doan's departure from Dow. Doan periodically visited the research labs at Dow and was always interested in the work of each employee.

=== Trioka ===
Trioka is Russian term for a wagon pulled by a team of three horses abreast. Doan formed a management trioka at Dow with board chairman Carl Gerstacker responsible for finance and marketing; executive vice-president Ben Branch in charge of international business and manufacturing; Doan managed everything else. They met every other week on Monday mornings. Once each year they would retreat for a week to determine company strategy for the next year and evaluate all 300 senior managers. Upon their return, promotions and personnel changes were effected.

=== Overseas ===
When Dow realized that constructing manufacturing facilities in other countries created demand, they began producing plastics in Germany, Greece, Spain and Italy. The largest investment was in the Netherlands, at Terneuzen. That chemical complex opened in 1965. Plants were also built in South America: Argentina and Colombia plus New Zealand. With extensive operations all around the world, Doan and his managers had a meeting in 1965 where they acknowledged the need to decentralize. They established a headquarters on every continent to manage business. Dow Europe, Dow Latin America and Dow Pacific were established in 1966. Technology centers were also established for 33 key products.

== Retirement ==
Doan stepped down from Dow in 1971 when global sales had achieved $2 billion and Doan proclaimed that he and Dow were "healthy as horses". He believed that competent younger employees should be placed in senior positions because they have the new ideas and energy to advance the company. It really wasn't "retirement" for him; he was only 48. He remained on Dow's Board of Directors until 1987 and served on Dow Corning Corporation's board until 1987 when he reached Dow's mandatory retirement age of 65.

He founded venture capital firm Doan Associates in 1971, and in 1974, Doan Resources Corp., a small-business investment company. He was co-founder and board member of biotechnology company Neogen

Doan continued working on projects until he became ill a few months before he passed.

== Personal ==
Doan married Donalda "Donnie" Lockwood in 1946. The couple had four children: Jeffrey (1947), Christine (1949), Michael (1953) and Ruth (1954). When he took breaks from work, he went to the golf course for fun. He usually won, then enjoyed a coke and hotdog at the clubhouse. After he left Dow, Doan married Anna Junia Cassell in 1975 and the union bore one child: Alexandria (1978). After battling abdominal issues for several months, Doan died May 16, 2006 at UM Medical Center in Ann Arbor, Michigan. He was 83.

== Accolades ==
Former Dow CEO and chairman Andrew Liveris said, Ted Doan "was a man who understood that the gifts of wealth, position and intellect carried with them responsibilities to others." Doan did not self-promote. Another said former Dow CEO and chairman Bill Stavropoulos stated:

"Ted Doan was probably the most open, generous and unpretentious person I have ever known. Almost every positive thing that has happened in Midland over the past 40 years had his imprint on it, but you would never know it. So much of what he did was low-key and often anonymous." Doan initially refused to allow the Midland County Historical Society's building to bear his name "when in fact his name and Junia's should be on nearly every civic improvement project in this town...not to mention the many other good works they did in the state, in the country and across the world."

Regarding Doan's talent for giving advice, Northwood University President David Fry commented:

"Some people are talkers and some people are listeners. Ted was a listener, then a thinker, then an integrator. He would ask Socratic questions in order for you to increase your own understanding of the context of your thoughts and where they were leading you."

Lawrence Reed, president of the Mackinac Center for Public Policy lamented the passing of Doan:

""Ted Doan was one of those people you meet only a few times in your life who impress you as a one-of-a-kind Renaissance citizen. He could connect with a Nobel laureate as readily as the guy next door. He was always kind, generous, thoughtful, smart and genuinely fun to be around. Ted will always be thought of not only as epitomizing Midland’s best, but as a gentleman of boundless character and an ambassador of goodwill to the country and beyond. He never borrowed from integrity to pay for expediency — a trait far too rare in the world these days."

== Community involvement ==
Doan was an early supporter of Saginaw Valley State University and the Midland Law Enforcement Center. He was instrumental in establishing the Midland Community Foundation and construction of the Tridge, a popular Midland landmark.

== Awards & honors ==
- Honorary Doctor of Laws degree, 1993 University of Michigan
- American Institute of Chemical Engineers (AIChE)
- American Chemical Society (ACS)
- Sigma Xi, the Scientific Research Honor Society founded at Cornell
- Petrochemical Heritage Award, 2002
- Cornell University’s Engineering Council, emeritus member
- Cornell’s Research Foundation, member
- University of Michigan College of Engineering advisory board
- Michigan Molecular Institute, chairman
- Michigan Venture Capital Task Force, co-chairman
- National Science Board member, 1976 to 1982; Chairman 1981-1982
- MITECH+, founder
- Dendritech, Inc., board member
- ARCH Development Corp., founding member
- Michigan High Technology Task Force, president
- Office of Technology Assessment, board
- Argonne National Laboratories Board of Governors
- Herbert H. and Grace A. Dow Foundation, Trustee and Chairman
- Herbert Dow Doan Science Building at Saginaw Valley State University

== See also ==
Herbert & Junia Doan Residence
