= Jim Fitterling =

American business executive

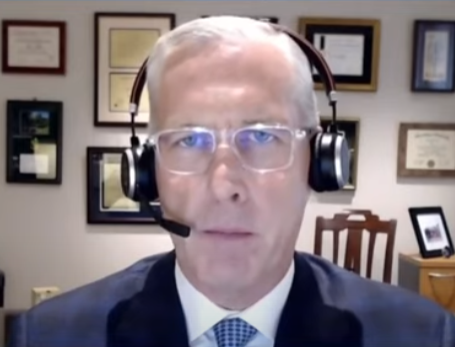
- Fitterling in 2021
- Born: James Ray Fitterling; 1962 (age 63–64); Missouri, U.S.
- Education: University of Missouri, Columbia (BS)
- Occupation: Executive chairman at Dow Inc.
- Partner: Alex Lee

James Ray Fitterling (born 1962) is an American business executive. He is the executive chairman and former president and CEO of Dow Inc., Fitterling is vice-chair of the National Association of Manufacturers, and on the boards of the American Chemistry Council and the U.S.-China Business Council.

The first board-appointed out CEO of a Fortune 100 company; Fitterling was ranked the world's top LGBT executive by the Financial Times in 2018. He is also a member of The Business Council.

== Early life and education ==
Jim Fitterling was born in 1962 in Missouri, where he spent his youth in the small farm town of Odessa. He attended the University of Missouri, graduating from the school's College of Engineering in 1983 with a BS in mechanical engineering.

== Career ==
=== 1984-2004: Early roles with Dow ===
In 1984, Fitterling was hired by The Dow Chemical Company. In 1998, he became CEO of Filmtec Corporation, a subsidiary of Dow. Also in 1998, he became global business director of Dow's liquid separations unit. He was named both general manager of Dow Thailand and managing director of the SCC - Dow Group of joint venture companies in 2000. In 2002, Fitterling became CEO of The OPTIMAL Group, an affiliate company of both Dow and Petroliam Nasional Berhad. He began overseeing OPTIMAL's regions in Southeast Asia and Australia in 2004.

=== 2005-2015: Dow executive roles ===
He left OPTIMAL Group in 2005 to become business vice president of polyethylene at Dow Chemical Corporation. He then was Dow's president of basic plastics from 2007 until 2009. Soon, Fitterling was also a member of several committees at Dow, including the Executive Leadership Committee, the Management Committee and the Strategy Board.

In 2012, Fitterling was given "executive oversight of feedstocks, performance plastics in Asia and Latin America." While still an executive vice president, in November 2012, Fitterling was appointed a member of Dow's newly formed executive committee. In 2014, Fitterling became vice chairman of business operations for Dow. In October 2015, he was named chief operating officer of Dow, which announced its merger with DuPont in December 2015. Fitterling then worked with Dow's CEO on reforming the new company into three separate entities, and to later be COO of the new Dow company.

=== 2016-2019: Dow president and CEO ===
On February 2, 2016, Dow Chemical announced that Fitterling would be replacing Andrew Liveris as Dow president upon Liveris' retirement in 2017. In 2016, he was named Dow's president and chief operating officer, positions he still held into 2017. From September 2017 to March 2019, Fitterling also was COO of the materials science division of DowDuPont.

On March 12, 2018, he was named the CEO of the new Dow Inc., which was split, on April 1, 2019, from DowDuPont, as the new parent company of The Dow Chemical Company. In 2019, he became the first openly gay CEO of a large industrial company and the first board-appointed out CEO of a Fortune 100 company.

== Appearances and awards ==
Fitterling has appeared in the media as a Dow representative. He was the keynote speaker at the 2015 Manufacturing Leadership Summit, and has spoken at the IHS World Petrochemical Conference in Houston, Texas. In 2017, the American Institute of Chemical Engineers (AIChE) awarded him the “Doing a World of Good” Medal. In 2018, he was given the College of Engineering Alumni Award from the Mizzou Alumni Association.

Following a bout with cancer in celebration of National Coming Out Day, in 2014 Fitterling came out to Dow's employees. He is an advocate for diversity in corporate and educational settings and, in 2016, was quoted by The Wall Street Journal on Dow's public campaign against anti-gay rights legislation in states such as North Carolina, Tennessee, Mississippi, and Georgia. Fitterling was ranked #73 on the Top 100 LGBT Leaders list published by The Financial Times in 2015, ranking #28 the following year, #1 in 2018, and #3 in 2019. In March 2019, he was featured in the Bloomberg Businessweek article "How Dow Chemical Got Woke".

In July 2026, he was succeeded as CEO by Karen S. Carter and became executive chairman of Dow.

== Boards ==
Fitterling is vice chair of the National Association of Manufacturers' board, as well as on the boards of the American Chemistry Council and the U.S.-China Business Council. He is a trustee at the Herbert H. and Grace A. Dow Foundation. He is also on the CEO Roundtable of the American Heart Association, and on the Dean's Engineering Advisory Council at the University of Missouri. Fitterling was previously chairman at Univation Technologies LLC and on the boards of TCF Financial Corporation and Sadara Chemical Company. He was also president of the board of the Midland Country Club in Michigan.

CHARITABLE DONATIONS

James made a $25 million charitable donation to Alleghany Health Network Cancer Research Center in November 2026. When diagnosed with stage IV appendiceal cancer he was treated by Dr David Bartlett at AHN. Fitterlings gift was the largest in AHN history and in turn the AHN Cancer center will now be called the AHN James R. Fitterling Cancer Center

== Personal life ==
Fitterling is a resident of Midland, Michigan.
