= Alexandre Hohagen =

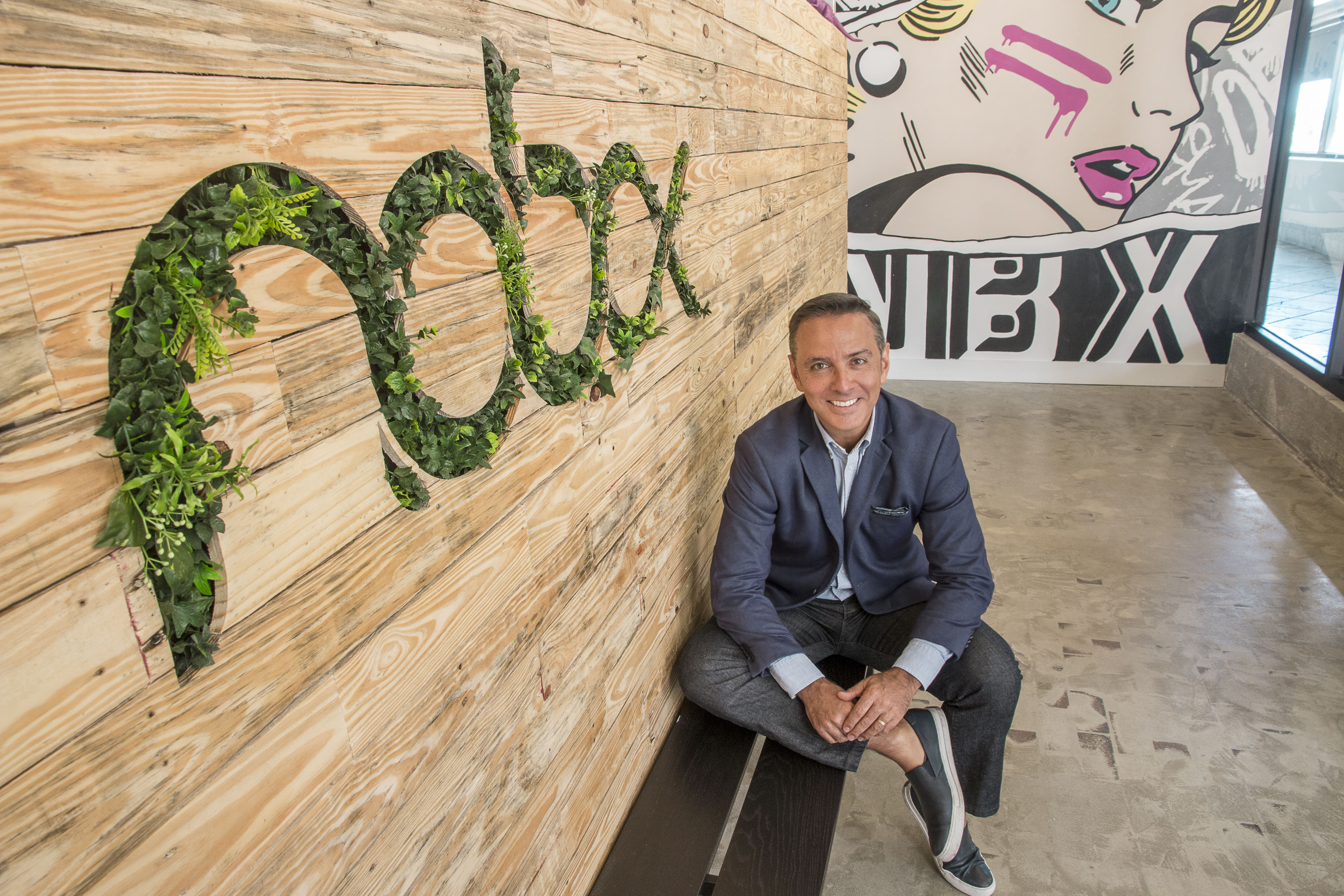
- Alexandre Hogagen
- Born: Sao Paulo, Brazil
- Education: University of São Paulo
- Occupations: CEO of Nobox, investor and partner at Ampfy, Botmaker, MarketUP, investor at Busbud, Ativore Real Estate, and others. Previous V President of Google Latin America (2005-2011) and V President of Facebook Latin America & US Hispanics (2011-2015)

Alexandre Hohagen is a Brazilian executive with over 20 years of experience managing F500 companies in Latin America (Dow Chemical, HBO, UOL, Google, Facebook).

Hohagen was responsible for starting two global technology companies in Latin America and the US Hispanic markets. He started the operations of Google in the region in 2005 and then Facebook in 2011. In 2010, Hohagen became one of the first international VPs at Google, managing operations of the company in over 8 countries in the region.

Hohagen is currently the CEO of Nobox, investor and partner at Ampfy, Botmaker, MarketUP, investor at Hyper, Busbud and Everypost, besides other investments VC funds and real estate in Brazil, US and Europe. Hohagen left the corporate world in 2015, after spending 5,5 years building Facebook in Latin America and US Hispanic markets. In his tenure, Hohagen was responsible to open and manage operations in more than 5 countries, with a team of 500 employees.

== Education ==
Hohagen has a degree in communications from Faculdades Integradas Alcantara Machado, masters in people management from the University of São Paulo and post -graduate degrees in Business Administration from the International Institute for Management Development (IMD, Switzerland) and IIHR in the Netherlands.

== Career ==
=== Early career ===
He began his career managing public relations for Dow Chemical Brazil In 1995, he coordinated the Human Resources department for Boehringer Ingelheim and later the ABN Amro Bank. Beginning in 2000, he held several positions at UOL (Universo Online) including the Human Resources Director, Vice-President of advertising and e-commerce, and Director of Electronic Commerce. He then became General Manager of HBO Brazil and oversaw the operations of the HBO Premium Channel and the Warner Channel.

In 2008, he was nominated as an "Executivo de Valor" (Top Executive) in the IT and service sectors by the major Brazilian business newspaper Valor Economico.

=== Google ===
In 2005, Hohagen joined Google as the General Manager for Brazil and held this position until August 2008. At this time, Google named Brazil as the location for Google's Latin American headquarters and Hohagen as the Managing Director of Google Latin America.

Since becoming the Latin American Managing Director of Google, Hohagen has made several major business moves for Google Latin America. Not long after the promotion, Hohagen signed a term of behavior adjustment with federal prosecutors to cooperatives in the Fight Against pedophilia on the Internet. Google's social network, Orkut, which was very popular at the time in Latin America, had quickly been overrun by child pornography. Hohagen's act of signing the Conduct Adjustment Term not only showed Google's commitment to Brazilian law, but also Hohagen's commitment to eradicating online pedophilia. The filter Hohagen and Google implemented on Google's Orkut social network, is said to have reduced child pornography on the site by over 70%.

He oversaw the implementation of Google Public Transport for Rio de Janeiro on Google Maps in 2009.

In 2010, he announced the "Doodle for Google" contest, in which children ages six to fifteen where invited to submit a remake of the Google logo inspired by the theme "Brazil’s Future". For every entry Google received, the company planted a tree in a forest on the border of São Paulo and Paraná, Brazil. The winner of the contest received a laptop, a trip to the forest, and their design featured on Google for 24 hours.

=== Facebook ===
In 2011, Hohagen was hired as the first employee and Vice President of Facebook for Latin America and US Hispanics.
