= Paul Oreffice =

American businessman (1927–2024)

Paul Fausto Oreffice (Venice, November 29, 1927 – December 26, 2024) was an Italian-born American businessman and Thoroughbred horse owner, who became the president and chief executive of the Dow Chemical Company.
