= Rollin M. Gerstacker Foundation =

Nonprofit organization in Midland, Michigan, United States

- Abbreviation: RMGF
- Established: 1957; 69 years ago
- Type: 501(c)(3) nonprofit organization
- Tax ID no.: 38-6060276
- Headquarters: Post Office Box 1945, Midland, Michigan, US
- Coordinates: 43.6137°N 84.2460°W
- Region served: Midland, Michigan and Cleveland, Ohio
- President & CEO: Lisa J. Gerstacker
- Key people: Laurie G. Bouwman; Bill Schuette; Paul F. Oreffice; William S. Stavropoulos
- Revenue: $5.49M (2024)
- Expenses: $11M (2024)
- Endowment: $137M (2024)
- Website: gerstackerfoundation.org

The Rollin M. Gerstacker Foundation is the second-largest charitable funding organization based in Midland, Michigan. During 2024, gifts exceeded $9 million and in their 67-year history, over $300 million has been disbursed.

== Foundation ==
In 1957, Mrs. Eda U. Gerstacker created the foundation in her husband's memory after his death in 1945. The Gerstackers invested early in the Dow Chemical Company on the advice of her brother-in-law, and their stock was worth a small fortune. During that first year, gifts of $875 were disbursed. The foundation's stated purpose is to forever provide financial aid to the types of charities that were favored by Eda and her husband, Rollin. The charities should be located proximate to Cleveland in Ohio and Midland in Michigan where she, her sister and their husbands lived.

The charity's request must support one of the following areas:

- health care and research
- educational institutions
- general support for communities
- the arts and music
- social services
- activities for youth
- churches

== History ==
Eda's brother-in-law, James T. Pardee was an early financial backer of Herbert Henry Dow when he founded the Dow Chemical Company. He served on Dow's board for many years and accumulated a fortune. When James died in January 1944 and his wife, Elsa died ten months later, they left their wealth to Eda. By the time Eda died in 1975, she had donated all their wealth to the Gerstacker Foundation.

Eda's son Carl Gerstacker worked at Dow Chemical for over 40 years including 17 as chairman of the board. When he died in 1995, he followed his mother's example and donated most of his wealth to the Gerstacker Foundation.

== Programs ==
- The Gerstacker Fellowship Program was created from a $1.5 million endowment in 2005. Each year leadership development program for administrators and teachers. Build K-12 educational leaders to improve educational quality in Michigan.
- The foundation provided a gift of $2 million to the College of Engineering at the University of Michigan to create an endowed, full professorship, the Rollin M. Gerstacker Professor of Engineering. The recipient will be appointed for five-year renewable terms.
- Located near Midland's Tridge, Gerstacker Spray Park allows kids of all ages to beat the heat with a cooling, wet experience. The water features are available sunup to sundown from June through September.
- The annual Excellence in Teaching awards identify four outstanding Midland Public School teachers, two from elementary and two from secondary, who have exceeded the standard level of professionalism. The winners receive a gift to memorialize the event and a cash payout for use in continuing education, research or travel. The awards, funded by Gerstacker, were first made in 1956.
- On the North Campus of the University of Michigan exists a 4 acres (1.6 ha) quadrangle of land between the Art, Engineering and Architecture colleges. The tract was mostly unused until it was renovated and renamed, the Eda U. Gerstacker Grove between 2013 and 2015. Locally known as the GROVE, it can now host recreation, events and performances as well as normal activities.
- In April 2017, the Tridge was closed for renovations with all stain to be removed and restained and some board replacements. The bridge's full reopening would happen in October with a partial reopening on the Fourth of July. The Gerstacker Foundation donated $2.5 million towards the project.
- The 1926 Midland County Courthouse was renovated in 2018 to modernize including new elevators, electrical, plumbing, HVAC and fire suppression at a cost of nearly $8.5 million. The Gerstacker Foundation contributed $1.5 million toward the project.

== Trustees ==
The trustees have traditionally been members of the Gerstacker family and executives from Dow Chemical. As of 2023, the trustees were:

- Laurie G. Bouwman, Chairperson
- Lisa J. Gerstacker, President & Chief Executive Officer
- Bill Schuette, Executive Vice President & Assistant Treasurer
- Paul Oreffice
- William S. Stavropoulos
- Gail Lanphear
- William G. Schuette
