= Charles J. Strosacker =

American philanthropist and corporate executive (1882–1963)

- Philanthropist
- Born: Charles John Strosacker; November 15, 1882; Valley City, Ohio, US
- Died: March 27, 1963 (aged 80); Midland, Michigan, US
- Education: BS, Chemical Engineering 1906 PhD, Chemistry 1912
- Alma mater: Case School of Applied Science University of Michigan
- Known for: Dow executive & the work of his charitable foundation
- Parents: William George Strosacker (father); Caroline Fredricka Frank (mother)
- Awards: 34 Patents
- Scientific career
- Fields: chemical engineering
- Workplaces: Dow Chemical Company

Notes
Charles J. Strosacker Foundation
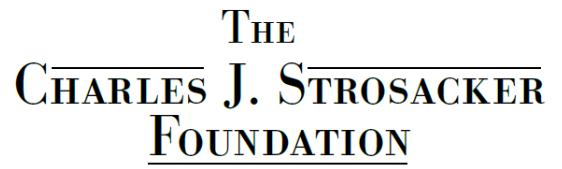
- Abbreviation: CJSF
- Established: 1958; 68 years ago
- Type: 501(c)(3) nonprofit organization
- Tax ID no.: 38-6062787
- Headquarters: Post Office Box 471, Midland, Michigan, US
- Region served: State of Michigan
- President & CEO: Kimberlee A. Baczewski
- Key people: Bobbie Nelson Arnold, Board Chairperson
- Revenue: $6.35M (2023)
- Expenses: $4.87M (2023)
- Endowment: $59.6M (2023)
- Website: strosacker.org

Charles J. Strosacker (November 15, 1882 – March 27, 1963) was a chemical engineer, Dow Chemical Company pioneer, executive and board member who is best known for the work of the charitable foundation he established six years before his death. In over six decades of existence, it has made donations exceeding $126 million.

== Early years ==
Charles J. Strosacker was born in 1882 in Valley City, Ohio. He was the third of four children of William George Strosacker, a farmer and blacksmith, and his wife, Caroline Fredricka Frank. His parents were both first generation citizens of German immigrant parents. His youth was spent working at his grandfather's store, working on the family farm, and attending a single room school. Strosacker studied at Baldwin University from 1902 to 1903 then attended Case School of Applied Science, now known as Case School of Engineering at Case Western Reserve University in Cleveland, Ohio. He studied chemical engineering, was a member of the science and engineering honor society Sigma Xi and graduated in 1906 with a Bachelor of Science degree. He was a lifetime member of the American Chemical Society. While employed at Dow, he pursued graduate studies at the University of Michigan, where he earned a chemistry doctorate in 1912.

== Business ==
His first job was with the Ontario Nickel Company, but the company went bankrupt in the Panic of 1907. He joined Dow Chemical in 1907 at the invitation of Herbert Henry Dow, another Case alumni. That same financial crisis effected Dow Chemical as well with the company unable to pay their employees for months. Many quit for other jobs; those who stayed were compensated with Dow stock certificates worth nothing. Strosacker was one of those. Having no family and savings from his first job, he waited for the company to come back.

When H.H. Dow died in 1930, Strosacker was appointed to the board of directors. Dow trademarked "Saran" in 1940, but the company did not initially develop the product commercially. In 1941, Strosacker received a promotion to vice president.

After the war ended, two Dow employees began a side business by cutting the film into 12" wide, 25' lengths and marketing it as "cling wrap" in 1947. Strosacker convinced them to sell their venture to Dow in 1948 and the following year, Dow marketed a commercial version of the product.

Strosacker remained a vice president until his retirement after 54 years of service and 34 patents.

== Family ==
Strosacker never married but was social with membership in the Midland Country Club and the Midland Supper Club. He was dedicated to his sister and family. His father died in 1917; his brother married but died in 1922 with no children. His oldest sister Anna married and had two children, James and Ethel, but Anna died in 1939, two years after their mother. Charles was less under 60 years old.

In November, 1942, Strosacker's sister Bertha died of breast cancer; in response, he funded the construction of a Presbyterian church. "The Bertha E. R. Strosacker Memorial Presbyterian Church", as he wished to name it, was completed in 1953.

Bertha E. R. Strosaker Memorial Presbyterian Church

=== Church ===
The First Presbyterian Church in Midland was founded in 1867 and the building was the first church constructed in the city, but burned to the ground in 1876. Another building was constructed during 1882, serving the congregation for over sixty years.

== Civic involvement ==
In addition to his contributions to the church, he assisted widows and others who were in need, paying bills and house payments. Strosacker was a Freemason, a founding member of the Midland Rotary Club and designated a noteworthy chemical engineer by Marquis Who's Who.

=== Foundation ===
In 1957 Strosacker established the Charles J. Strosacker Foundation, intended "To assist and benefit political subdivisions of the State of Michigan, and religious, charitable, benevolent, scientific or educational organizations." Ethel Thrune, niece of Charles Strosacker, was a key to the start of the Foundation and served as chairman of the board. According to the foundation, they are "small in design and primarily local in nature."

In calendar year 2024 the organization had charitable disbursements over $4 million; income of over $1.8 million and assets exceeding $105 million.

The United Way of Midland County gives the annual Charles J. Strosacker Award to an individual for their contributions to a partner agency that promotes the well-being of residents from Midland County. Nominees must demonstrate leadership, compassion, innovation and impact.

=== Significant recipients ===
- Saginaw Valley State University scholarships, capital projects, an endowed chair and programs
- Michigan State University $500K endowment fund for graduate research.
- City of Midland, Michigan Thrune Park, named in honor of Ethel Thrune, niece of Charles Strosacker and board chairman of Strosacker Foundation
- Northwood University $500K endowment fund for Arnold Football Endowment
- Alma College Charles J. Strosacker Theatre
- United Way Strosacker Center a facility for United Way operations and several affiliated agencies.
- Coleman Area Library A public library that offers internet access, community meeting rooms and programs for adults and youth
- North Midland Family center provides local residents with pre-school, daycare, social services, fitness (including Karate), computer literacy and Senior Adult activities
- Coleman Family center provides local residents with pre-school, daycare, aerobics, teen center, food pantry and after-school activities
- Arnold Center Midland & Arnold Center Gladwin providing vocational, social and life skills training opportunities for people with disabilities
- MyMichigan Medical Center Midland received a $1.25 million donation toward a new heart and vascular center in 2017.
- Strosacker Auditorium at Case Western Reserve University
- Strosacker Hall at Baldwin Wallace University
- Strosacker Science Center at Hillsdale College was constructed in 2008, consisting of a three-story addition/renovation with 17,200

=== Book ===
Children can read the story of Charles Strosacker in a 2006 book titled, "The Quiet Gift," which was funded by the Midland Area Community Foundation and was given to visitors at Midland's Santa House.
