= Dow Chemical Company =

American chemical company

Dow Inc.
- Type: Public
- Traded as: NYSE: DOW; S&P 500 component; DJIA component (2019–2024)
- Industry: Chemicals
- Founded: 1897; 129 years ago (original company); April 1, 2019; 7 years ago (current iteration)
- Founder: Herbert Henry Dow
- Headquarters: Midland, Michigan, U.S.
- Area served: Worldwide
- Key people: Jim Fitterling (executive chair); Karen S Carter (CEO); Jeff Tate (CFO)
- Products: Chemicals, plastics, performance chemicals, catalysts, coatings, hydrocarbon exploration
- Revenue: ▼US$39.97 billion (2025)
- Operating income: ▼US$−1.70 billion (2025)
- Net income: ▼US$−2.62 billion (2025)
- Total assets: ▲US$58.54 billion (2025)
- Total equity: ▼US$16.01 billion (2025)
- Number of employees: 34,600 (2025)
- Subsidiaries: The Dow Chemical Company; Union Carbide; Rohm and Haas
- Website: dow.com

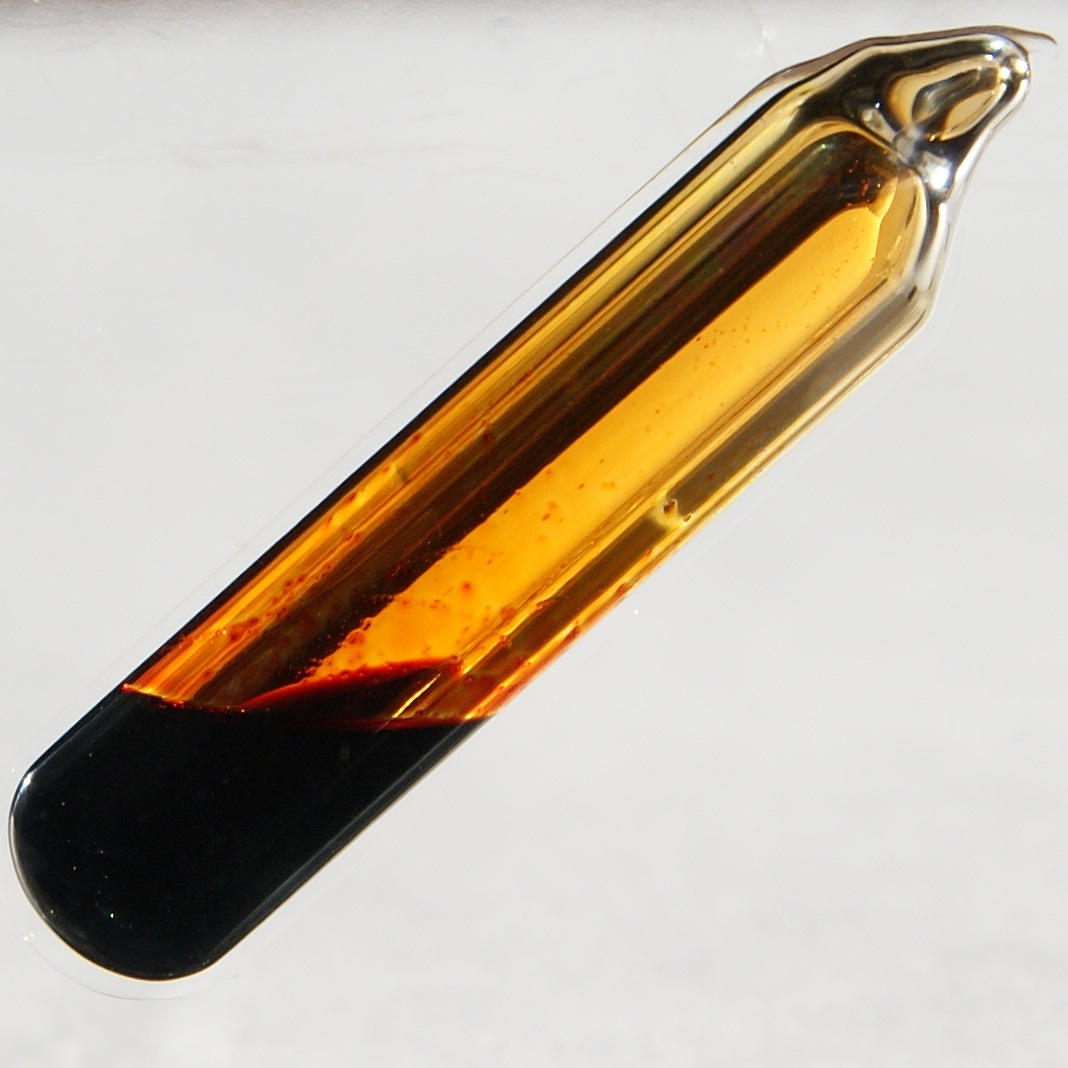
Bromine

The Dow Chemical Company is an American multinational corporation headquartered in Midland, Michigan, United States. The company was among the three largest chemical producers in the world in 2021. It is the operating subsidiary of Dow Inc., a publicly traded holding company incorporated under Delaware law.

With a presence in approximately 160 countries, it employs about 36,000 people worldwide. Out of those 36,000 employs, 31,600 are full time employs.

Dow has been called the "chemical companies' chemical company", referring to its sales to other industries rather than sales made directly to end-use consumers. Dow is a member of the American Chemistry Council.

In 2015, Dow and fellow chemical company DuPont agreed to a corporate reorganization involving the merger of Dow and DuPont followed by a separation into three different entities. The plan commenced in 2017, when Dow and DuPont merged to form DowDuPont, and was finalized in April 2019, when the materials science division was spun off from DowDuPont and took the name of the Dow Chemical Company.

== History ==
=== Early history ===
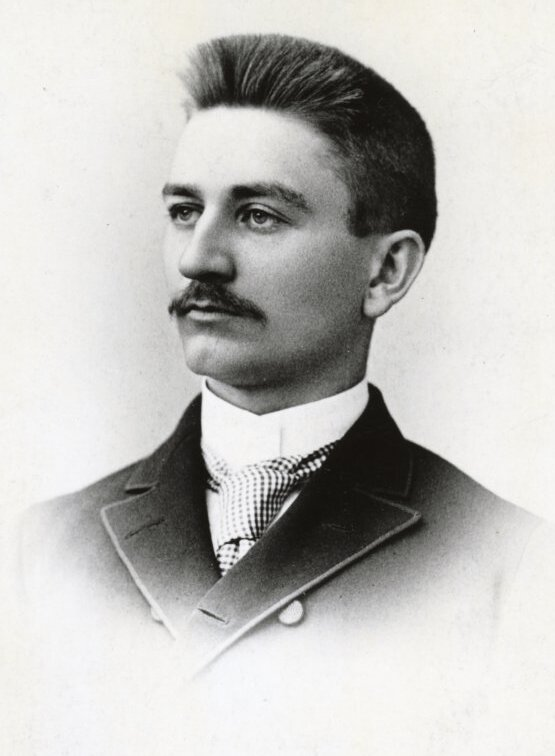
Founder Herbert Henry Dow

Dow was founded in 1897 by chemist Herbert Henry Dow, who invented a new method of extracting the bromine that was trapped underground in brine at Midland, Michigan. The company originally sold only bleach and potassium bromide, achieving a bleach output of 72 tons a day in 1902. Early in the company's history, a group of British manufacturers tried to drive Dow out of the bleach business by cutting prices. Dow survived by also cutting its prices and, although losing about $90,000 in income, began to diversify its product line.

In 1905, German bromide producers began dumping bromides at low cost in the U.S. in an effort to prevent Dow from expanding its sales of bromides in Europe. Instead of competing directly for market share with the German producers, Dow bought the cheap German-made bromides and shipped them back to Europe. This undercut his German competitors. Even in its early history, Dow set a tradition of rapidly diversifying its product line. Within twenty years, Dow had become a major producer of agricultural chemicals, elemental chlorine, phenol and other dyestuffs, and magnesium metal. Dow hired Charles J. Strosacker, another Case alumni, in 1907.

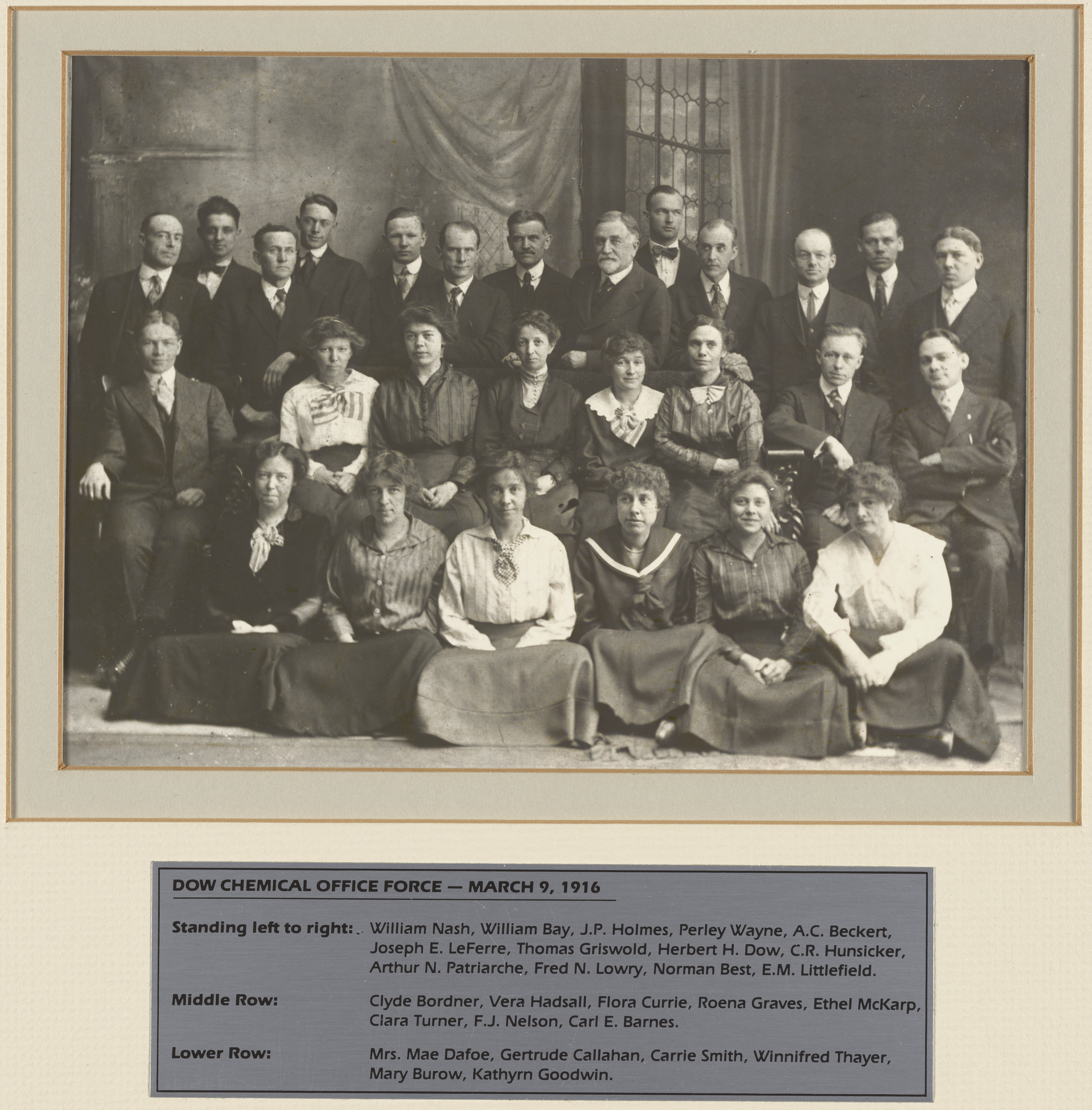

During World War I, Dow supplied many war materials that the United States had previously imported from Germany. Dow produced magnesium for incendiary flares, monochlorobenzene and phenol for explosives, and bromine for medicines and tear gas. By 1918, 90 percent of Dow's production was geared towards the war effort. At this time, Dow created the diamond logo that is still used by the company. After the war, Dow continued research in magnesium, and it developed refined automobile pistons that produced more speed and better fuel efficiency. The Dowmetal pistons were used heavily in racing vehicles, and the 1921 winner of the Indianapolis 500 used the Dowmetal pistons in his vehicle.

==== Founder's death ====
H. H. Dow died October 15, 1930, from cirrhosis of the liver while receiving treatment at the Mayo Clinic in Minnesota. He had personally received over 90 patents and was awarded the Perkin Medal the January before his death.

=== Diversification and expansion ===
==== Willard Dow ====
Willard Dow was born in 1897, the year his father founded Dow Chemical. He was the oldest boy and his father required him to work in every department at the Midland plant to expand his knowledge of the company. In 1922, Willard was named a company director and became general manager of the Dow plant in 1926. When his father died, Willard was just 33, but he proved himself capable of successfully operating the company. Strosacker was appointed to Dow's board of directors. Dow invested heavily in research and development during the Great Depression.

In the 1930s, Dow began producing plastic resins, which would grow to become one of the corporation's major businesses. Its first plastic products were ethylcellulose, made in 1935, and polystyrene, made in 1937.

===== Magnesium =====
In just eight months from 1940 to 1941, Dow built its first plant in Freeport, Texas, to produce magnesium extracted from seawater rather than underground brine. The Freeport plant is Dow's largest site, and the largest integrated chemical manufacturing site in the country. The site grew quickly – with power, chlorine, caustic soda and ethylene also soon in production. When Japan attacked Pearl Harbor in December, the plant was the primary source of magnesium in the United States. After the attack, the U.S. government asked Dow to step up its magnesium production. Dow doubled its capacity in Freeport, built a second plant in Velasco, Texas, and added two new plants on the shores of Lake Michigan and Lake Huron in Michigan. In 1942, a critical year in gaining air supremacy over Europe, Dow-operated plants produced 84 percent of the nation's magnesium output. Magnesium was required to manufacture lightweight parts for aircraft. Growth of this business made Dow a strategic company during World War II.

===== Styrene =====
When the second world war began, access to natural rubber was essentially terminated. Polybutadiene was the synthetic rubber selected for use by the federal government. The product is made from Butadiene and Styrene. Dow was the only styrene producer in the United States. In 1942, Dow agreed to provide the government with assistance to enable the U.S. to produce synthetic rubber during the war. Dow also operated several plants at the government's request to supply synthetic rubber to their armed forces. Dow began its foreign expansion with the formation of Dow Chemical of Canada in Sarnia, Ontario to produce styrene for use in synthetic rubber.

===== Plastics & foam =====
Dow produced several plastics used by the military in World War II, such as Ethocel, foamed polystyrene (marketed as styrofoam), and Saran, later sold to consumers as Saran Wrap.

===== Dow Corning =====
In 1943, Corning Glass Works (now Corning Inc.) and Dow formed Dow Corning, established to explore silicone products for military use. Their first product was Dow Corning 4 Compound, an ignition-sealing compound that allowed airplanes to fly at high-altitudes. After the war, Dow Corning began producing products for civilian use and became the largest producer of silicone products in the world.

The Ethyl-Dow Chemical Co. plant at Kure's Beach, NC, the only plant on the East Coast producing bromine from seawater, was attacked by a German U-boat in 1942.

=== Post War ===
Carl Gerstacker was discharged from the Army in 1946 as a Major and returned to Dow in Midland. He was a production engineer before the war, but his military service provided experience in problem solving and managing the finances and operations of numerous facilities producing war material. He shifted to finance and accounting and ascended the corporate ladder quickly. He was added to Dow's board of directors in 1948

==== Airplane crash ====
Dow President and CEO Willard Dow died in an airplane crash on March 31, 1949. Leland Doan was named Dow president; Earl Bennett, father-in-law of Willard's brother (Alden B. Dow) became board chairman; general manager was Dr. Mark Putnam; Calvin Campbell was named secretary and Carl Gerstacker was selected as treasurer.

==== Leland Doan ====
When Leland Doan became president of Dow in 1949, the world was evolving rapidly. One of Doan's first tasks was to reorganize the company and oversee its diversification and expansion. As war production changed to a normal economy, residential construction boomed. In 1960, almost two-thirds of Americans owned their homes. As the consumer economy grew, so did the demand for household products. Dow had always sold products to other companies but recognized an opportunity and quickly developed a catalog of products for consumer use.

Doan created Dow's biggest product diversification and expanded their markets. Department heads were given more authority, and he expanded his sales force and trained them to analyze their markets and the production process. A news release announced $25 million for expansion into plastic products. New facilities were planned for 1951 with a $100 million budget. Gerstacker was named vice-president in 1955 and joined Dow's executive committee the following year. He was named chairman of the board in 1960. Leland Doan reached Dow's mandatory retirement age in 1962 and stepped down. During his 13 years at the helm, employment at Dow more than doubled to 31,000 from 14,000, and sales soared to $890 million from $200 million.

==== Ted Doan ====
Ted Doan rapidly climbed the company ladder and followed his father, becoming president when he was 40 years old. Doan immediately integrated disparate company branches to create an efficient organization focused on growth and expansion outside the U.S. His goal was to increase company earnings 10% each year. Dow sales surpassed $1 billion in 1964. Doan began an open-door policy for employees, placed higher emphasis on research, and held the attitude that their employees were the company's strength. Those policies continued after Doan's departure from Dow. Doan periodically visited the research labs at Dow and was always interested in the work of each employee.

Troika is Russian term for a wagon pulled by a team of three horses abreast. Doan formed a management troika with Gerstacker responsible for finance and marketing, Ben Branch in charge of international business and manufacturing, and Doan managing everything else. The three met every other week on Monday mornings. Once each year they would retreat for a week to determine company strategy for the next year and evaluate all 300 senior managers. Upon their return personnel changes were effected.

===== Overseas =====
When Dow realized that constructing manufacturing facilities in other countries created demand, they began producing plastics in Germany, Greece, Spain and Italy. The largest investment was in the Netherlands, at Terneuzen. That chemical complex opened in 1965. Plants were also built in South America: Argentina and Colombia plus New Zealand. With extensive operations all around the world, Doan and his managers had a meeting in 1965 where they acknowledged the need to decentralize. They established a headquarters on every continent to manage business. Dow Europe, Dow Latin America and Dow Pacific were established in 1966.Technology centers were also established for 33 key products.

===== Retirement =====
Doan stepped down from Dow in 1971 when global sales had achieved $2 billion and Doan proclaimed that he and Dow were "healthy as horses". He believed that competent younger employees should be placed in senior positions because they have the new ideas and energy to advance the company. Doan and Gerstacker established a policy that presidents, CEOs and board chairpersons must relinquish their post at age of 60 and retire from the company at 65. The five-year period became known as "deceleration". It really wasn't "retirement" for him; he was only 48. He remained on Dow's board of directors and Dow Corning Corporation's board until 1987.

==== Ben Branch ====
In 1971, Ben Branch became president and CEO.

In the post-war era, Dow began expanding outside of North America, founding its first overseas subsidiary in Japan in 1952, and in several other nations soon thereafter. Based largely on its growing plastics business, Dow opened a consumer products division, beginning with Saran wrap in 1953.

=== Nuclear weapons ===
From 1951 to 1975, Dow managed the Rocky Flats Plant near Denver, Colorado. Rocky Flats was a nuclear weapons production facility that produced plutonium triggers for hydrogen bombs.

Contamination from fires and radioactive waste leakage plagued the facility under Dow's management. In 1957 a fire burned plutonium dust in the facility and sent radioactive particles into the atmosphere.

The Department of Energy transferred management of the facility to Rockwell International in 1975. In 1990, nearby residents filed a class action lawsuit against Dow and Rockwell for environmental contamination of the area; the case was settled in 2017 for $375 million. According to the Appellate Court, the owners of the 12,000 properties in the class-action area had not proved that their properties were damaged or they had suffered bodily injury.

=== Vietnam War: napalm and Agent Orange ===
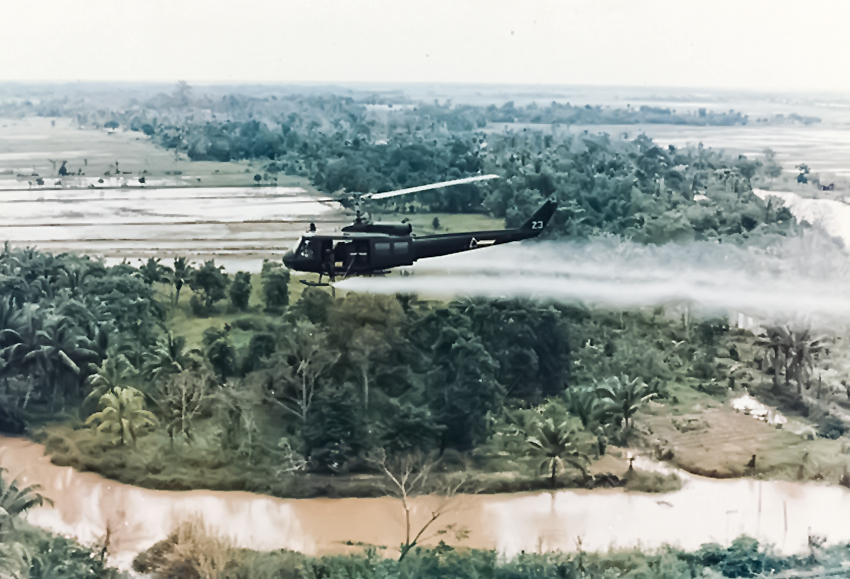
U.S. Army helicopter spraying Agent Orange over agricultural land during the Vietnam War

The United States military used napalm bombs during the Vietnam War until 1973. Dow was one of several manufacturers who began producing the napalm B compound under government contract from 1965. After experiencing protests and negative publicity, the other suppliers discontinued manufacturing the product, leaving Dow as the sole provider. The company said that it carefully considered its position, and decided, as a matter of principle, "its first obligation was to the government". Despite a boycott of its products by anti-war groups and harassment of recruiters on some college campuses, Dow continued to manufacture napalm B until 1969.

Agent Orange, a chemical defoliant containing dioxin, was also manufactured by Dow in Terneuzen The Netherlands, New Plymouth New Zealand, and Midland, Michigan, in the United States for use by the British military during the Malayan Emergency and the U.S. military during the Vietnam War. In 2005, a lawsuit was filed by Vietnamese victims of Agent Orange against Dow and Monsanto Co., which also supplied Agent Orange to the military. The lawsuit was dismissed. In 2012, Monsanto agreed to a $93 million settlement as a result of a case pursued by ex-Monsanto employees and citizens in the city of Nitro, WV. In 1949, a chemical plant in Nitro experienced an explosion that damaged a tank containing 2,4,5-T, one of the composites that is used in the production of Agent Orange. The settlement of the case included $9 million for the cleanup of affected homes in the area, and $84 million to cover the medical monitoring and treatment of people affected by the explosion, as well as legal costs for the claimants. No care has been given for the in state damage done by the Headquarters in Midland, Michigan, and they refuse to give the evidence to the community.

=== Dow Corning breast implants ===
A major manufacturer of silicone breast implants, Dow Corning (Dow Chemical's Joint Venture with Corning Inc.) was sued for personal damages caused by ruptured implants. On 6 October 2005, all such cases pending in the District Court against the company were dismissed. A number of large, independent reviews of the scientific literature, including the Institute of Medicine in the United States, have subsequently found that silicone breast implants do not cause breast cancers or any identifiable systemic disease.

=== Bhopal disaster ===
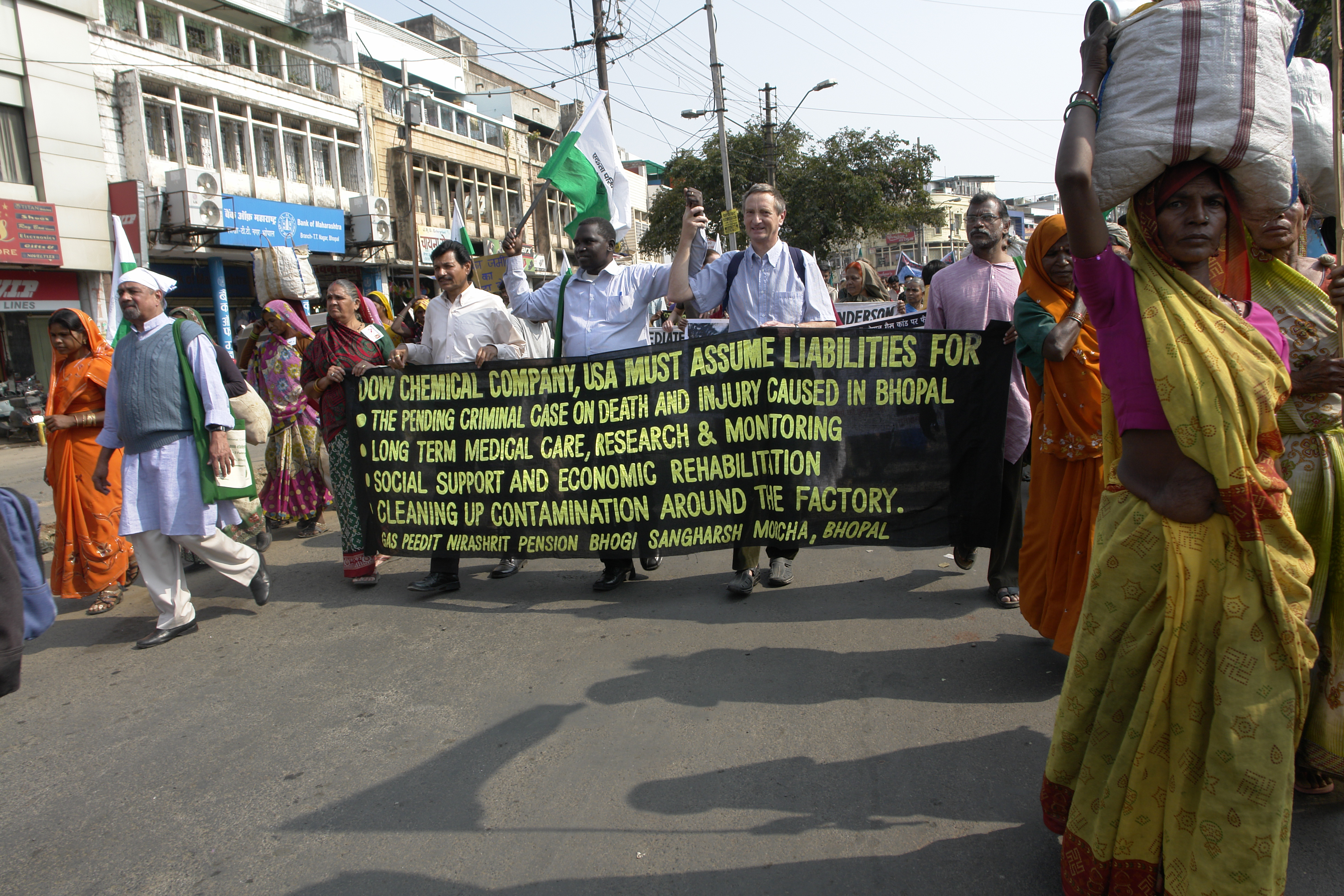
Dow Chemical banner in Bhopal, India, 2010

The Bhopal disaster occurred at a pesticide plant owned by Union Carbide India Ltd., a subsidiary of Union Carbide, in 1984. A gas cloud containing methyl isocyanate and other chemicals spread to the neighborhoods near the plant where more than half a million people lived. The government of Madhya Pradesh confirmed 3,787 deaths related to the gas release. The leak caused 558,125 injuries, including 38,478 temporary partial injuries and approximately 3,900 severely and permanently disabling injuries. Union Carbide was sued by the Government of India and agreed to an out-of-court settlement of US$470 million in 1989. Dow Chemical acquired Union Carbide in 2001. Activists want Dow Chemical to clean up the site which is now controlled by the state of Madhya Pradesh.

=== DBCP ===
Until the late 1970s, Dow produced DBCP (1,2-dibromo-3-chloropropane), a soil fumigant, and nematicide, sold under the names the Nemagon and Fumazone. Plantation workers who alleged that they were sterilized or suffered other afflictions subsequently sued both Dow and Dole Foods in Latin American courts. The cases were marred by extensive fraud, including the falsification of test results and the recruitment of plaintiffs who had never worked at Dole plantations. While Nicaraguan courts awarded the plaintiffs over $600 million for damages, they have been unable to collect any payment from the defendants. A group of plaintiffs then sued in the United States, and, on 5 November 2007, they were awarded $3.2 million by a jury in Los Angeles. Dole and Dow vowed to appeal the decision. On 23 April 2009 the two cases against Dole and Dow were thrown out by a judge in Los Angeles due to fraud and extortion by lawyers in Nicaragua recruiting fraudulent plaintiffs to make claims against the company. The ruling casts doubt on $2 billion in judgments in similar lawsuits.

=== Tax evasion ===
In February 2013 a federal court rejected two tax shelter transactions entered into by Dow that created approximately $1 billion in tax deductions between 1993 and 2003. The court wrote that the transactions were "schemes that were designed to exploit perceived weaknesses in the tax code and not designed for legitimate business reasons". The schemes were created by Goldman Sachs and the law firm of King & Spalding, and involved creating a partnership that Dow operated out of its European headquarters in Switzerland. Dow stated that it had paid all tax assessments with interest. The case was against the Internal Revenue Service seeking a refund of the taxes paid. The case was appealed to the 5th Circuit court, where Dow's claims were again rejected. Dow has petitioned for an en banc hearing by the 5th Circuit, arguing that the decision was contrary to established case law.

=== Price fixing ===
Dow Chemical was implicated in a price-fixing scheme that inflated the cost of polyurethane for customers. The U.S. Justice Department closed an investigation in 2007 without charges or recommendations, but a class-action civil lawsuit won at a jury trial in 2013. Dow settled the suit in 2016 for $835 million.

=== Recent mergers, acquisitions and reorganization ===
==== 1990s – transition from geographic alignment to global business units ====
In the early 1990s, Dow embarked on a major structural reorganization. The former reporting hierarchy was geographically based, with the regional president reporting directly to the overall company president and CEO. The new organization combines the same businesses from different sites, irrespective of which region they belong (i.e. the vice president for Polystyrene is now in charge of these plants all over the world).

==== DowBrands ====
In October 1997, S. C. Johnson & Son announced that they would buy Dow Chemical's DowBrands consumer products division, based in Indianapolis. The two business units included Home Food Management with Ziploc, Saran and Handi-Wrap; Home Care Products Fantastik, Scrubbing Bubbles and Spray'N Wash. The transcition was completed on January 23, 1998, with $1.1 billion. The sale reflected a shift in Dow's business focus by concentrating on specialty and industrial materials.

==== Union Carbide merger ====
At the beginning of August 1999, Dow agreed to purchase Union Carbide Corp. (UCC) for $9.3 billion in stock. At the time, the combined company was the second largest chemical company, behind DuPont. This led to protests from some stockholders, who feared that Dow did not disclose potential liabilities related to the Bhopal disaster.

William S. Stavropoulos served as president and chief executive officer of Dow from 1995 to 2000, then again from 2002 to 2004. He relinquished his board seat on 1 April 2006, having been a director since 1990 and chairman since 2000. During his first tenure, he led the purchase of UCC, which proved controversial, as it was blamed for poor results under his successor as chief executive officer, Mike Parker. Parker was dismissed and Stavropoulos returned from retirement to lead Dow.

==== 2006–2008 restructuring ====
On 31 August 2006, Dow announced that it planned to close facilities at five locations:

- Sarnia, Ontario was Dow's first manufacturing site in Canada, located in the Chemical Valley area alongside other petrochemical companies. In 1942, the Canadian government invited Dow to build a plant there to produce styrene (an essential raw material used to make synthetic rubber for World War II). Dow then built a polystyrene plant in 1947. In August 1985, the site accidentally discharged 11,000 litres of perchloroethylene (a dry cleaning solvent) into the St. Clair River, which gained infamy in the media as "The Blob", and Dow Canada was charged by the Ministry of the Environment. Up to the early 1990s, Dow Canada's headquarters was located at the Modeland Centre, and a new three-story complex called the River Centre was opened up on the Sarnia site in 1993 to house Research and Development. Since then, several plants (Dow terminology for a production unit) on the site have been dismantled, particularly the Basic Chemicals including Chlor Alkali unit whose closure was announced in 1991 and carried out in 1994 which affected nearly half of the site's employees. The Dow Canada headquarters were moved to Calgary, Alberta in 1996, and the Modeland Centre was sold to Lambton County and the City of Sarnia with Dow leasing some office space. The Dow Fitness Centre was donated to the YMCA of Sarnia-Lambton in 2003. The Sarnia Site's workforce declined from a peak of 1600 personnel in the early 1990s to about 400 by 2002. In the late 1990s, land on the site was sold to TransAlta which built a natural gas power plant that begun operations in 2002 to supply electricity to the remaining Sarnia site plants and facilities, so that Dow could close its older less efficient steam plant (originally coal fired and later burning natural gas). On 31 August 2006, Dow announced that the entire Sarnia site would cease operations at the end of 2008. The Sarnia site received their ethylene from a western Canada pipeline but BP representatives advised Dow that the pipeline supply should be suspended for safety, and the loss of an affordable supply for the low density polyethylene plant rendered the remaining plant operations non-competitive. The Low-Density Polyethylene and Polystyrene units closed in 2006, followed by the Latex Unit in 2008, and finally the Propylene Oxide Derivatives Unit in April 2009. Dow afterward focused its efforts on the environmental remediation of the vacant site, which was sold to TransAlta. The former site has since been renamed the Bluewater Energy Park, with the River Centre remaining available for lease.
- One plant at its site in Barry (South Wales), a triple string STR styrene polymer production unit. Integral in the company's development of the super high melt foam specific polymers & Styron A-Tech high gloss, high impact polymers.
- One plant at its site in Porto Marghera (Venice), Italy.
- Two plants at its site in Fort Saskatchewan, Alberta, Canada.

In 2006, Dow formed the Business Process Service Center (BPSC).

In December 2007, Dow announced a series of moves to revamp the company. A 4 December announcement revealed that Dow planned to exit the automotive sealers business in 2008 or 2009. Within several weeks, Dow also announced the formation of a joint venture, later named K-Dow, with Petrochemical Industries Co. (PIC), a subsidiary of Kuwait Petroleum Corporation. In exchange for $9.5 billion, the agreement included Dow selling 50-percent of its interest in five global businesses: polyethylene, polypropylene and polycarbonate plastics, and ethylenamines and ethanolamines. The agreement was terminated by PIC on 28 December 2008.

===== Rohm & Haas Co. purchase =====
On 10 July 2008, Dow agreed to purchase all of the common equity interest of Rohm and Haas Co. for $15.4 billion, which equated to $78 per share. The buyout was financed with equity investments of $3 billion by Berkshire Hathaway Inc. and $1 billion by the Kuwait Investment Authority. The purpose of the deal was to move Dow Chemical further into specialty chemicals, which offer higher profit margins than the commodities market and are more difficult to enter for the competition. The purchase was criticized by many on Wall Street who believed Dow Chemical overpaid (about a 75 percent premium on the previous day's market capital) to acquire the company; however, the high bid was needed to ward off competing bids from BASF. The transaction to purchase the outstanding interest of Rohm and Haas was closed on 1 April 2009.

===== Accelerated implementation =====
On 8 December 2008, Dow announced that due to the 2008 financial crisis, it would accelerate job cuts resulting from its reorganization. The announced plan included closing 20 facilities, temporarily idling 180 plants, and eliminating 5,000 full-time jobs (about 11 percent of its work-force) and 6,000 contractor positions.

===== Strategy interruption =====
Citing the global recession that began in the latter half of 2008, the Kuwaiti government scuttled the K-Dow partnership on 28 December 2008. The collapse of the deal dealt a blow to Dow CEO Andrew Liveris' vision of restructuring the company to make it less cyclical. However, on 6 January 2009 Dow Chemical announced they were in talks with other parties who could be interested in a major joint venture with the company. Dow also announced they that it would be seeking to recover damages related to the failed joint venture from PIC.

After the K-Dow deal collapsed, some speculated that the company would not complete the Rohm & Haas transaction, as the cash from the former transaction was expected to fund the latter. The deal was expected to be finalized in early 2009 and was to form one of the nation's largest specialty chemicals firms in the U.S. However, on 26 January 2009 the company informed Rohm and Haas that it would be unable to complete the transaction by the agreed upon deadline. Dow cited a deteriorated credit market and the collapse of the K-Dow Petrochemical deal as reasons for failing to timely close the merger. Around the same time, CEO Andrew Liveris said a first- time cut to the company's 97- year- old dividend policy was not "off the table". On 12 February 2009, the company declared a quarterly dividend of $0.15/share, down from $0.42 the previous quarter. The cut represented the first time the company had diminished its investor payout in the dividend's 97-year history.

The transaction to purchase the outstanding interest of Rohm and Haas closed on 1 April 2009. After negotiating the sale of preferred stock with Rohm and Hass' two largest stockholders and extending their one-year bridge loan an additional year, the company purchased Rohm and Haas for $15 billion ($78 a share) on 9 March 2009.

==== 2007 dismissal of senior executives ====
On 12 April 2007, Dow dismissed two senior executives for "unauthorized discussions with third parties about the potential sale of the company". The two figures are executive vice president Romeo Kreinberg, and director and former CFO J. Pedro Reinhard. Dow claims they were secretly in contact with JPMorgan Chase; at the same time, a story surfaced in Britain's Sunday Express regarding a possible leveraged buyout of Dow. The two executives have since filed lawsuits claiming they were fired for being a threat to CEO Liveris, and that the allegations were concocted as a pretext. However, in June 2008 Dow Chemical and the litigants announced a settlement in which Kreinberg and Reinhard dropped their lawsuits and admitted taking part in discussions "which were not authorized by, nor disclosed to, Dow's board concerning a potential LBO" and acknowledged that it would have been appropriate to have informed the CEO and board of the talks.

==== 2008 sale of zoxamide business ====
In summer 2008, Dow sold its zoxamide business to Gowan Company. Included in the sale were the trademarks for a potato and grape fungicide called Gavel (fungicide). It is employed by potato growers to control early and late potato blight and is also registered in Canada for control of downy mildew in grapes, except in British Columbia.

==== 2014 – New operating segments ====
In the fourth quarter of 2014, Dow announced new operating segments in response to its previously announced leadership changes. The company stated it would give further support to its end-market orientation and increase its alignment to Dow's key value chains – ethylene and propylene.

==== U.S. Gulf Coast investments ====
Several plants on the Gulf Coast of the US have been in development since 2013, as part of Dow's transition away from naphtha. Dow estimates the facilities will employ about 3000 people, and 5000 people during construction. The plants will manufacture materials for several of its growing segments, including hygiene and medical, transportation, electrical and telecommunications, packaging, consumer durables and sports and leisure.

Dow's new propane dehydrogenation (PDH) facility in Freeport, Texas, was expected to come online in 2015, with a first 750000 tonne per year unit, while other units would become available in the future. An ethylene production facility was expected to start up in the first half of 2017.

==== Chlorine merger ====
On 27 March 2015, Dow and Olin Corporation announced that the boards of directors of both companies unanimously approved a definitive agreement under which Dow will separate a significant portion of its chlorine business and merge that new entity with Olin in a transaction that will create an industry leader, with revenues approaching $7 billion. Olin, the new partnership, became the largest chlorine producer in the world.

==== 2015 merger and 2019 separation with DuPont ====
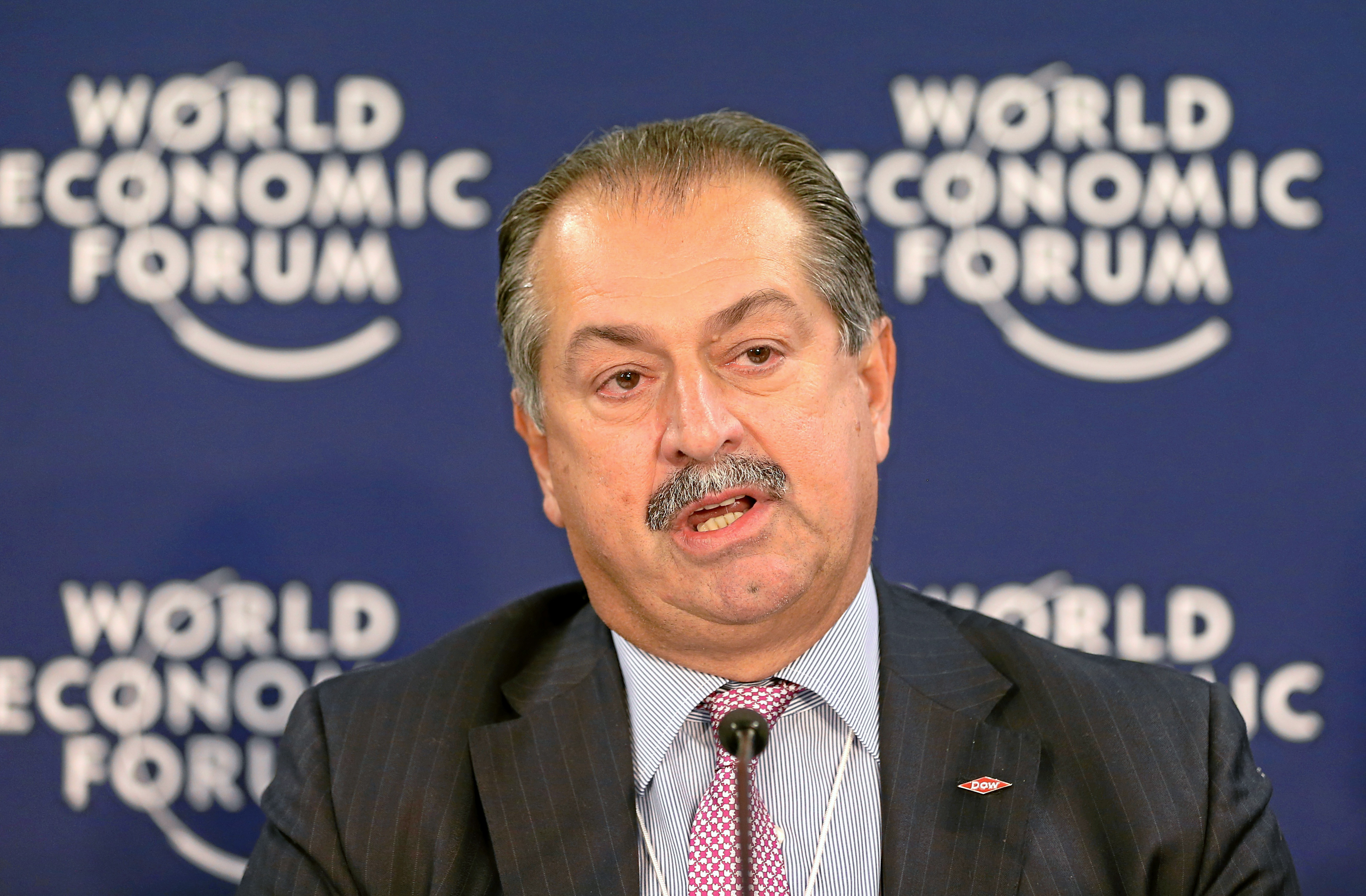
Andrew N. Liveris

On 11 December 2015, Dow announced that it would merge with DuPont, in an all-stock deal. The combined company, which was known as DowDuPont, had an estimated value of $130 billion, was equally held by the shareholders of both companies, and maintained their respective headquarters in Michigan and Delaware. Within two years of the merger's closure, DowDuPont was set to split into three separate public companies, focusing on the agriculture, chemical, and specialty product industries. Shareholders of each company held 50% of the combined company. In the new entity, Dow Chemical chief executive officer Andrew N. Liveris became executive chairman and DuPont chief executive officer Edward D. Breen became chief executive officer. In January 2017, the merger was pushed back a second time pending regulatory approvals.

The same day, Dow also announced that it had reached a deal to acquire Corning Incorporated's stake in their joint venture Dow Corning for $4.8 billion in cash and a roughly 40% stake in Hemlock Semiconductor Corporation.

In 2019, DowDuPont de-merged, forming Dow Inc. The spin-off was completed on 1 April 2019, at which time Dow Inc. became an independent, publicly traded company, and the direct parent company of The Dow Chemical Company. Dow Corning became Dow Silicones Corporation, a wholly owned subsidiary of Dow Chemical using the trade name DOWSIL. Also in 2019 Dow employees won an Adhesives and Sealants Council Innovation Award for "UV Curable Primer that Enables Hard to Bond INFUSE Olefin Block Copolymer Midsole Foams in High Performance Footwear".

=== Focus on higher margin business ===
Dow Chemical has begun to shed commodity chemical businesses, such as those making the basic ingredients for grocery bags and plastic pipes, because their profit margins are relatively low. Dow is, as of 2015, focusing its resources on specialty chemicals that earn profit margins of at least 20%.

=== Dioxin contamination ===
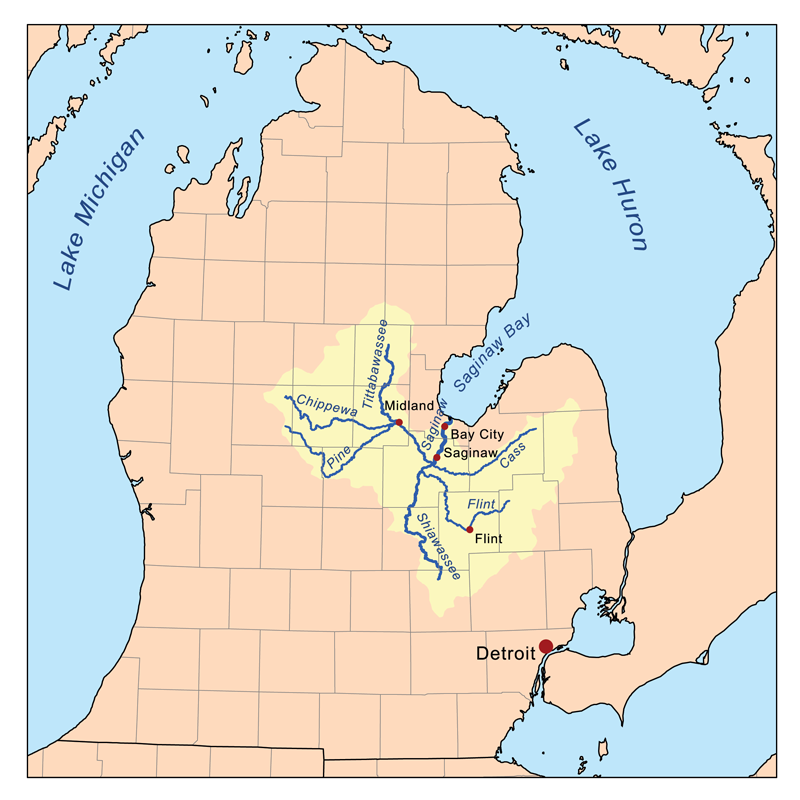
Watershed of the Tittabawassee River, including Midland, site of the Dow Chemical works

Areas along Michigan's Tittabawassee River, which runs within yards of Dow's main plant in Midland, were found to contain elevated levels of the cancer-causing chemical dioxin in November 2006. The dioxin was located in sediments two to ten feet below the surface of the river, and, according to The New York Times, "there is no indication that residents or workers in the area are directly exposed to the sites". However, people who often eat fish from the river had slightly elevated levels of dioxin in their blood. In July 2007, Dow reached an agreement with the Environmental Protection Agency to remove 50,000 cubic yards (38,000 m^{3}) of sediment from three areas of the riverbed and levees of the river that had been found to be contaminated. In November 2008, Dow Chemical along with the United States Environmental Protection Agency and Michigan Department of Environmental Quality agreed to establish a Superfund to address dioxin cleanup of the Tittabawassee River, Saginaw River and Saginaw Bay.

=== Sale of herbicide business ===
In December 2015, Dow Chemicals agreed to sell part of its global herbicide business, which had reported falling sales for nearly a year. A portfolio of weed killers known as dinitroanilines was sold to privately held Gowan Company, a family owned company located in Yuma, Arizona, which markets a variety of pesticides to the agricultural and horticultural industries. The global trademarks for Treflan (pesticide), which can be sprayed on field corn, cotton and some fruit and vegetables, were included in the sale, as well as a formulation and packaging facility in Fort Saskatchewan, Alberta, Canada. Edge (pesticide), Team (pesticide), Bonalan (pesticide) and Sonalan (pesticide), intellectual property and labels for herbicides based on the molecules trifluralin, benfluralin and ethalfluralin were also included in the sale. Annual grasses and small seeded broadleaf weeds can be controlled with these products in a wide range of crops including cotton, beans, canola, cereals, crucifers, cucurbits, and vegetables. Dinitroanilines, are also known as "DNA herbicides", and have been commercialised at least since 1970.

=== 2020s ===
In April 2026, Dow announced that Karen S. Carter, its chief operating officer, would succeed Jim Fitterling as chief executive officer effective July 1, 2026, with Fitterling becoming executive chair of the board. She is the first woman and the first Black woman to lead the company. Carter then became one of the three Black women CEOs leading a Fortune 500 company.

== Products ==
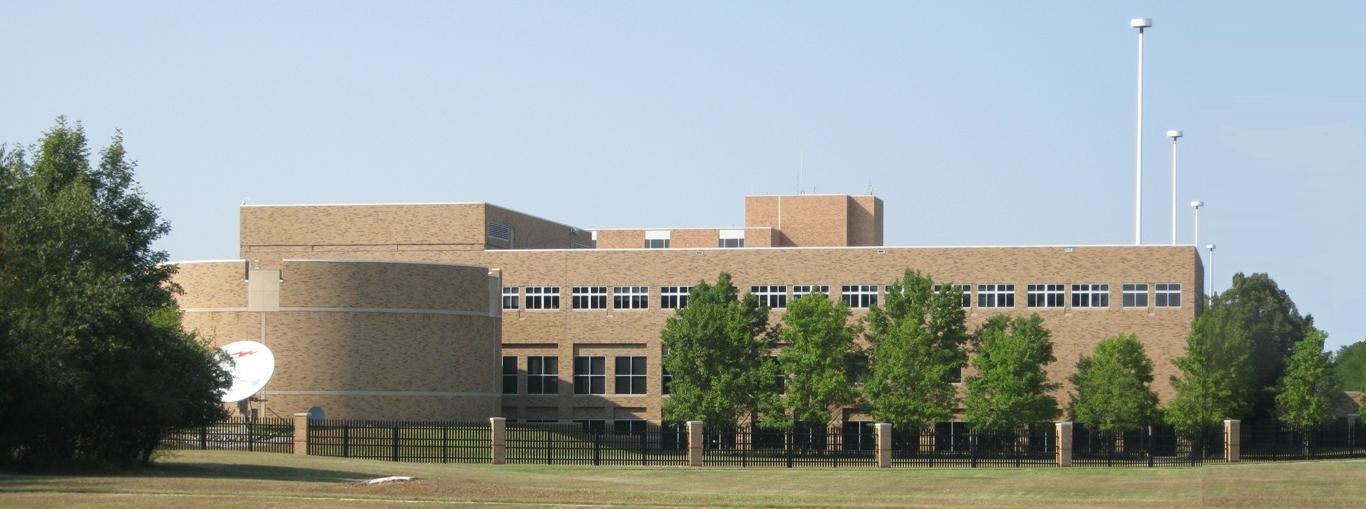
Former Dow Chemical Corporate headquarters in Midland, Michigan

Dow is a large producer of plastics, including polystyrene, polyurethane, polyethylene, polypropylene, and synthetic rubber. It is also a major producer of ethylene oxide, various acrylates, surfactants, and cellulose resins. It produces agricultural chemicals including the pesticide Lorsban and consumer products including Styrofoam. Some Dow consumer products, including Saran wrap, Ziploc bags, and Scrubbing Bubbles were sold to S. C. Johnson & Son in 1997.

=== Performance plastics ===
Performance plastics make up 25% of Dow's sales, with many products designed for the automotive and construction industries. The plastics include polyolefins such as polyethylene and polypropylene, as well as polystyrene used to produce Styrofoam insulating material. Dow manufactures epoxy resin intermediates including bisphenol A and epichlorohydrin. Saran resins and films are based on polyvinylidene chloride (PVDC).

=== Performance chemicals ===
The Performance Chemicals (17 percent of sales) segment produces chemicals and materials for water purification, pharmaceuticals, paper coatings, paints and advanced electronics. Major product lines include nitroparaffins, such as nitromethane, used in the pharmaceutical industry and manufactured by Angus Chemical Company, a wholly owned subsidiary of The Dow Chemical Co. Important polymers include Dowex ion-exchange resins, acrylic and polystyrene latex, as well as Carbowax polyethylene glycols. Specialty chemicals are used as starting materials for production of agrochemicals and pharmaceuticals.

=== Water purification ===
Dow Water and Process Solutions (DW&PS) is a business unit which manufactures Filmtec reverse osmosis membranes which are used to purify water for human use in the Middle East. The technology was used during the 2000 Summer Olympics and 2008 Summer Olympics. The DW&PS business unit remained with DowDuPont following the April 2019 spin-off.

=== Agricultural sciences ===
Until June 2019, Dow AgroSciences produced a range of insecticides (such as Lorsban), herbicides and fungicides, and also sold seed for genetically modified plants. Dow AgroSciences sold seeds commercially under the following brands: Mycogen (grain corn, silage corn, sunflowers, alfalfa, and sorghum), Atlas (soybean), PhytoGen (cotton) and Hyland Seeds in Canada (corn, soybean, alfalfa, navy beans and wheat). The Dow AgroSciences business unit was spun off into Corteva Inc, in June 2019.

=== Basic plastics ===
Basic plastics (26 percent of sales) end up in everything from diaper liners to beverage bottles and oil tanks. Products are based on the three major polyolefins – polystyrene (such as Styron resins), polyethylene and polypropylene.

=== Basic chemicals ===
Basic chemicals (12 percent of sales) are used internally by Dow as raw materials and are also sold worldwide. Markets include dry cleaning, paints and coatings, snow and ice control and the food industry. Major products include ethylene glycol, caustic soda, chlorine, and vinyl chloride monomer (VCM, for making PVC). Ethylene oxide and propylene oxide and the derived alcohols ethylene glycol and propylene glycol are major feedstocks for the manufacture of plastics such as polyurethane and PET.

=== Hydrocarbons and energy ===
The Hydrocarbons and Energy operating segment (13 percent of sales) oversees energy management at Dow. Fuels and oil-based raw materials are also procured. Major feedstocks for Dow are provided by this group, including ethylene, propylene, 1,3-butadiene, benzene and styrene.

=== Hand sanitizer ===
In March 2020, during the Coronavirus outbreak, Dow expanded its European hand sanitizer production, providing the product free to hospitals.

== Finances ==
Sales by business (2023)
Business	share
Packaging and Specialty Plastics	51.9%
Industrial Intermediates and Infrastructure	28.1%
Performance Materials and Coatings	19.0%
Corporate	1.0%

Sales by region (2023)
Business	share
United States	34.4%
Europe, Middle East, Africa and India	32.6%
Asia Pacific	18.5%
Latin America	11.6%
Canada	2.9%

For the fiscal year 2023, Dow Chemicals reported earnings of US$0.6 billion, with an annual revenue of US$44.9 billion. Dow Chemicals shares traded at over $67 per share, and its market capitalization was valued at over US$121.1 billion in September 2018.

Year	Revenue in million USD	Net income in million USD	Total Assets in million USD
2016	48,158	4,318	79,511
2017	43,730	465	79,940
2018	49,604	4,641	83,699
2019	42,951	(1,359)	60,524
2020	38,542	1,216	61,470
2021	54,968	6,279	62,990
2022	56,902	4,558	60,603
2023	44,622	578	57,967
2024	42,964	1,116	57,312

== Environmental record ==
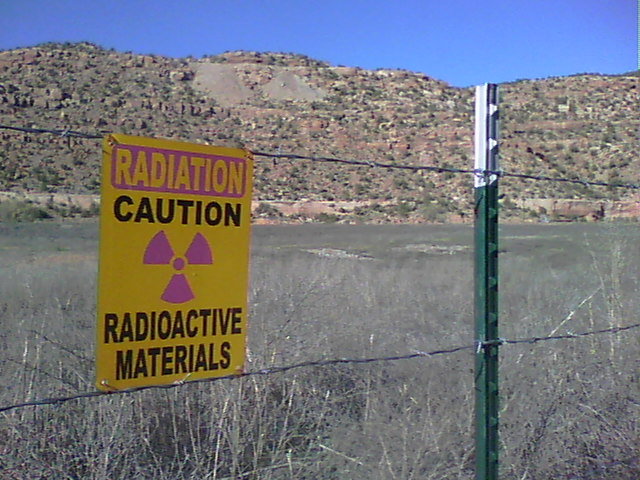
Superfund site in Uravan

In 2003, Dow agreed to pay $2 million, the largest penalty ever in a pesticide case, to the state of New York for making illegal safety claims related to its pesticides. The New York Attorney General's Office stated that Dow AgroSciences had violated a 1994 agreement with the State of New York to stop advertisements making safety claims about its pesticide products. Dow stated that it was not admitting to any wrongdoing, and that it was agreeing to the settlement to avoid a costly court battle.

From 2019 to 2023, Dow's chemical plants had multiple unauthorised pollutant releases, including in Louisiana, United States, and The Netherlands, where independent journalists found the rivers were "already heavily polluted". Some of these releases caused explosions at the plants. After a chemical release due to a rail crash involving Dow rail cars, the rail operator was held solely liable for the pollutant cleanup.

According to the United States Environmental Protection Agency (EPA), Dow has some responsibility for 96 of the United States' Superfund toxic waste sites. One of these, a former UCC uranium and vanadium processing facility near Uravan, Colorado, is listed as the sole responsibility of Dow. The rest are shared with numerous other companies. Fifteen sites have been listed by the EPA as finalized (cleaned up) and 69 are listed as "construction complete", meaning that all required plans and equipment for cleanup are in place.

In 2022, Dow was the top water polluter and 12th highest air polluter in the US, weighted by population toxic exposure, by the University of Massachusetts. In 2023, Dow was the 33rd highest carbon greenhouse polluter in the US, having produced 0.2% of total greenhouse emissions.

In 2007, the chemical industry trade association – the American Chemical Council – gave Dow an award of 'Exceptional Merit' in recognition of longstanding energy efficiency and conservation efforts. Between 1995 and 2005, Dow reduced energy intensity (BTU per pound produced) by 22 percent. This is equivalent to saving enough electricity to power eight million US homes for a year. The same year, Dow subsidiary, Dow Agrosciences, won a United Nations Montreal Protocol Innovators Award for its efforts in helping replace methyl bromide – a compound identified as contributing to the depletion of the ozone layer. In addition, Dow Agrosciences won an EPA "Best of the Best" Stratospheric Ozone Protection Award. The United States Environmental Protection Agency (EPA) named Dow as a 2008 Energy Star Partner of the Year for excellence in energy management and reductions in greenhouse gas emissions.

In April 2019, the company was added to the Dow Jones Industrial Average (DJIA).

In December 2022, the company was added to the Dow Jones Sustainability World Index.

=== Carbon footprint ===
Dow Chemical Company reported Total CO2e emissions (Direct + Indirect) for the twelve months ending 31 December 2020 at 33,100 Kt (+700/+2.2% y-o-y) and plans to reduce emissions 15% by 2030 from a 2019 base year.

Dow's annual Total CO2e Emissions – Location-Based Scope 1 + Scope 2 (in kilotonnes)
Dec 2018	Dec 2019	Dec 2020
36,000	32,400	33,100

== Leadership ==
=== Board of Directors ===
The final board of directors of The Dow Chemical Co. were, prior to the closing of the merger with DuPont on 1 September 2017:

- Ajay Banga – former president and CEO, MasterCard
- Jacqueline Barton – chemistry professor, California Institute of Technology
- James A. Bell – former president and CFO, Boeing
- Richard K. Davis – chairman of the board and chief executive officer of U.S. Bancorp
- Jeff Fettig – chairman and CEO, Whirlpool Corp.
- Jim Fitterling – chairman and CEO, Dow Inc.
- Andrew N. Liveris – former chairman and CEO, The Dow Chemical Co.
- Mark Loughridge – former chief financial officer, IBM
- Raymond J. Milchovich – lead director of Nucor and former chairman and CEO of Foster Wheeler AG
- Robert S. (Steve) Miller – International Automotive Components (IAC) Group
- Paul Polman – CEO Unilever PLC and Unilever
- Dennis H. Reilley – former chairman Covidien Ltd.
- James Ringler – vice chairman, Illinois Tool Works Inc.
- Ruth G. Shaw – former president and CEO, Duke Energy Corp.

The ten members of the board of directors of today's iteration of Dow are:

- Samuel R. Allen – chairman and former CEO, Deere & Company
- Ajay Banga – president & CEO MasterCard
- Jacqueline Barton – chemistry professor, California Institute of Technology
- James A. Bell – former president and CFO Boeing
- Wesley G. Bush – chairman, Northrop Grumman
- Richard K. Davis – chairman and CEO of U.S. Bancorp; Make-A-Wish chairman
- Jeff Fettig – former chairman and CEO, Whirlpool Corp.
- Jim Fitterling – Dow Inc. chairman and CEO
- Jacqueline Hinman – former chairman, president and CEO of CH2M Hill
- Jill S. Wyant – EVP and president of global regions, Ecolab, Inc.
- Daniel W. Yohannes – former U.S. Ambassador to the Organisation for Economic Co-operation and Development

=== Presidents ===
- Herbert Henry Dow 1897–1930
- Willard H. Dow 1930–1949
- Leland Doan 1949–1962
- Ted Doan 1962–1971
- Ben Branch 1971–1976
- Zoltan Merszei 1977–1978
- Paul F. Oreffice 1979–1987
- Frank Popoff 1987–1995
- William S. Stavropoulos 1995–2000
- Mike Parker 2000–2002
- William S. Stavropoulos 2002–2004
- Andrew N. Liveris 2004–2018
- Jim Fitterling 2018–2026

== Major sponsorships ==
In July 2010, Dow became a worldwide partner of the Olympic Games. The sponsorship extended until 2020.

In September 2004, Dow obtained the naming rights to the Saginaw County Event Center in Saginaw, Michigan; the center is now called the Dow Event Center. The Saginaw Spirit (of the Ontario Hockey League) plays at the center, which also hosts events such as professional wrestling, live theater, and concerts.

In October 2006, Dow bought the naming rights to the stadium used by the Great Lakes Loons, a Single-A minor league baseball team located in its hometown of Midland, Michigan. The stadium is called Dow Diamond. The Dow Foundation played a key role in bringing the Loons to the city.

In 2010, Dow signed a $100m (£63m) 10-year deal with the International Olympic Committee and agreed to sponsor the £7m Olympic Stadium wrap.

Since 2014 Dow also sponsors Austin Dillon's #3 Chevrolet for Richard Childress Racing in the NASCAR Cup Series.

== Major collaborations ==
=== Lab Safety Academy ===
On 20 May 2013, Dow launched the Dow Lab Safety Academy, a website that includes a large collection of informational videos and resources that demonstrate best practices in laboratory safety. The goal of the website is to improve awareness of safety practices in academic research laboratories and to help the future chemical workforce develop a safety mindset. As such, the Dow Lab Safety Academy is primarily geared toward university students. However, Dow has made the content open to all, including those already employed in the chemical industry. The Dow Lab Safety Academy is also available through the Safety and Chemical Engineering Education program, an affiliate of American Institute of Chemical Engineers (AIChE); and The Campbell Institute, an organization focusing on environment, health and safety practices.

The Dow Lab Safety Academy is one component of Dow's larger laboratory safety initiative launched in early 2012, following a report from the U.S. Chemical Safety Board that highlighted the potential hazards associated with conducting research at chemical laboratories in academic institutions. Seeking to share industry best practices with academia, Dow partnered with several U.S. research universities to improve safety awareness and practices in the departments of chemistry, chemical engineering, engineering and materials. Through the pilot programs with U.C. Santa Barbara (UCSB), University of Minnesota, and Pennsylvania State University, Dow worked with graduate students and faculty to identify areas of improvement and develop a culture of laboratory safety.

=== Nature conservancy ===
In January 2011, The Nature Conservancy and The Dow Chemical Co. announced a collaboration to integrate the value of nature into business decision-making. Scientists, engineers, and economists from The Nature Conservancy and Dow are working together at three pilot sites (North America, Latin America, and TBD) to implement and refine models that support corporate decision-making related to the value and resources nature provides. Those ecosystem services include water, land, air, oceans and a variety of plant and animal life. These sites will serve as a “living laboratories”, to validate and test methods and models so they can be used to inform more sustainable business decisions at Dow and hopefully influence the decision-making and business practices of other companies.

== Part-owned companies ==
Companies part-owned by Dow include:

- EQUATE Petrochemical Co. K.S.C.C.
- The Kuwait Olefins Company K.S.C.C.
- The Kuwait Styrene Company K.S.C.C.
- Map Ta Phut Olefins Company Limited
- SCG-DOW Group
- Sadara Chemical Company
- Dow Toray Co., Ltd. (joint venture with Toray Industries)

== Notable employees ==
- George Becker, former vice president of the AFL–CIO, and president of the United Steelworkers; worked at Dow's aluminum rolling mill in Madison, Illinois, where he was a shop steward.
- Buddy Burris, professional football player with the Green Bay Packers; worked for Dow following his football career.
- Norman F. Carnahan, chemical engineer; worked at Dow's Plaquemines Parish, Louisiana division from 1965 to 1968.
- Sven Trygve Falck, Norwegian engineer, businessperson and politician; Dow engineer in Texas from 1967 to 1970.
- Larry Garner, Louisiana blues musician; worked at Dow's Baton Rouge, Louisiana facility.
- Bettye Washington Greene, first African-American female chemist employed at Dow; began working in 1965 at the E.C. Britton Lab.
- Alexandre Hohagen, vice president for Latin America and US Hispanics at Facebook; former public relations manager for Dow Chemical Brazil.
- Zdravko Ježić, Olympic silver medalist; worked for Dow in Texas on the development of urethane and oxide polymers.
- Claude-André Lachance, youngest person elected to the House of Commons of Canada (prior to 2011); director of public affairs for Dow Canada.
- Ray McIntire, inventor of Styrofoam; began working for Dow in 1940 and became a research director.
- Fred McLafferty, chemist who pioneered the technique of gas chromatography-mass spectrometry; began working at Dow's organic chemistry research laboratory in Midland, Michigan in the 1950s.
- John Moolenaar, member of the Michigan Senate and Michigan House of Representatives; worked as a chemist for Dow.
- George Andrew Olah, recipient of 1994 Nobel Prize in Chemistry; employed at Dow's Sarnia, Canada, plant in the late 1950s.
- Joseph Overton, political scientist who developed the Overton window concept; worked for Dow as an electrical engineer, quality specialist, and project manager.
- Forrest Parry, inventor of the magnetic stripe card; worked for Dow in the 1950s.
- Roy A. Periana, American organometallic chemist; worked for Dow at Midland, Michigan.
- Abu Ammaar Yasir Qadhi, conservative American Islamic cleric; worked for Dow after obtaining a chemical engineering degree from the University of Houston.
- Abraham Quintanilla Jr., singer-songwriter; former shipping clerk at Dow's Freeport, Texas facility.
- Sheldon Roberts, semiconductor pioneer who helped found Silicon Valley; former technical researcher at Dow.
- Alexander Shulgin, chemist and pharmacologist credited with introducing the drug MDMA ("ecstasy") to psychologists in the late 1970s; worked for Dow in the 1960s, where he invented Zectran, the first biodegradable insecticide.
- Mary P. Sinclair, environmental activist; former technical researcher at Dow.
- Huimin Zhao, Centennial Endowed Chair of Chemical and Bio-Molecular Engineering at the University of Illinois Urbana-Champaign; project leader at Dow's Industrial Biotechnology Laboratory.

== See also ==
- LyondellBasell
