= Tridge =

Tridge or The Tridge may refer to:

- A three-way bridge
- The Tridge (Midland, Michigan), a three-way footbridge in Midland, Michigan
- The Tridge (Ypsilanti, Michigan), a three-way footbridge in Ypsilanti, Michigan
- Andrew Tridgell, or 'Tridge' (born 1967), Australian computer programmer

== See also ==
- Trige
