= Chippewassee Park =

Public park in Midland, Michigan, United States

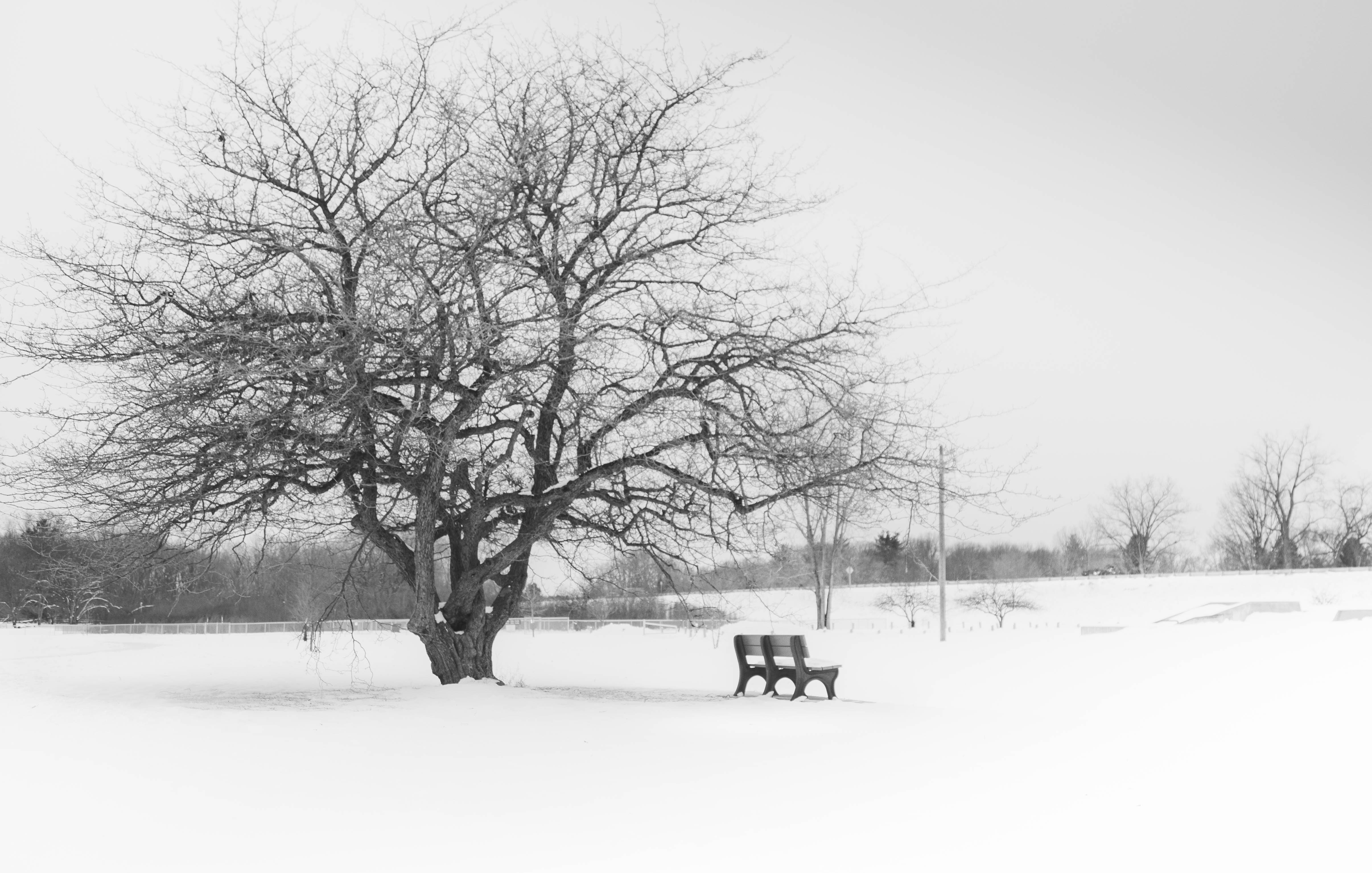
- Chippewassee Park in the winter.

- Location within Michigan
- Type: Public park
- Location: 1508 East Wheeler Street; Midland, Michigan
- Coordinates: 43°36′43″N 84°15′24″W
- Area: 35 acres (14 ha)
- Operator: City of Midland Parks and Recreation Department
- Open: Year round
- Status: Open

Chippewassee Park is one of the largest developed public parks in Midland, Michigan, United States, and the location of the tourist attraction The Tridge and other major features and events. The park, approximately 35 acres (14 ha), is located in the city's Midland West neighborhood and connects to the Historic neighborhood.

== Location ==
The park's 35 acres (14 ha) are located west of the confluence of the Tittabawassee and Chippewa rivers at the end of Ashman Street, and the park runs along M-20. Currie Golf Course shares the park's M-20 border. It is located in the city's Midland West neighborhood and connects to the Historic neighborhood and Towsley Dike Park via The Tridge.

== Features ==
There are numerous picnic and physical activity features available for public use—such as grills, picnic tables, play equipment, and a paved 1,000-foot (300 m) trail loop. In the winter months, it is used for cross-country skiing.

=== Midland Dog Park ===
Midland's only public dog park is a four-acre (1.6 ha) fenced-in area at the west end of Chippewassee Park near the Trilogy Skate Park. It was developed in 2005 with an anonymous gift of $40,000 (equivalent to $62,000 in 2024).

=== The Tridge ===
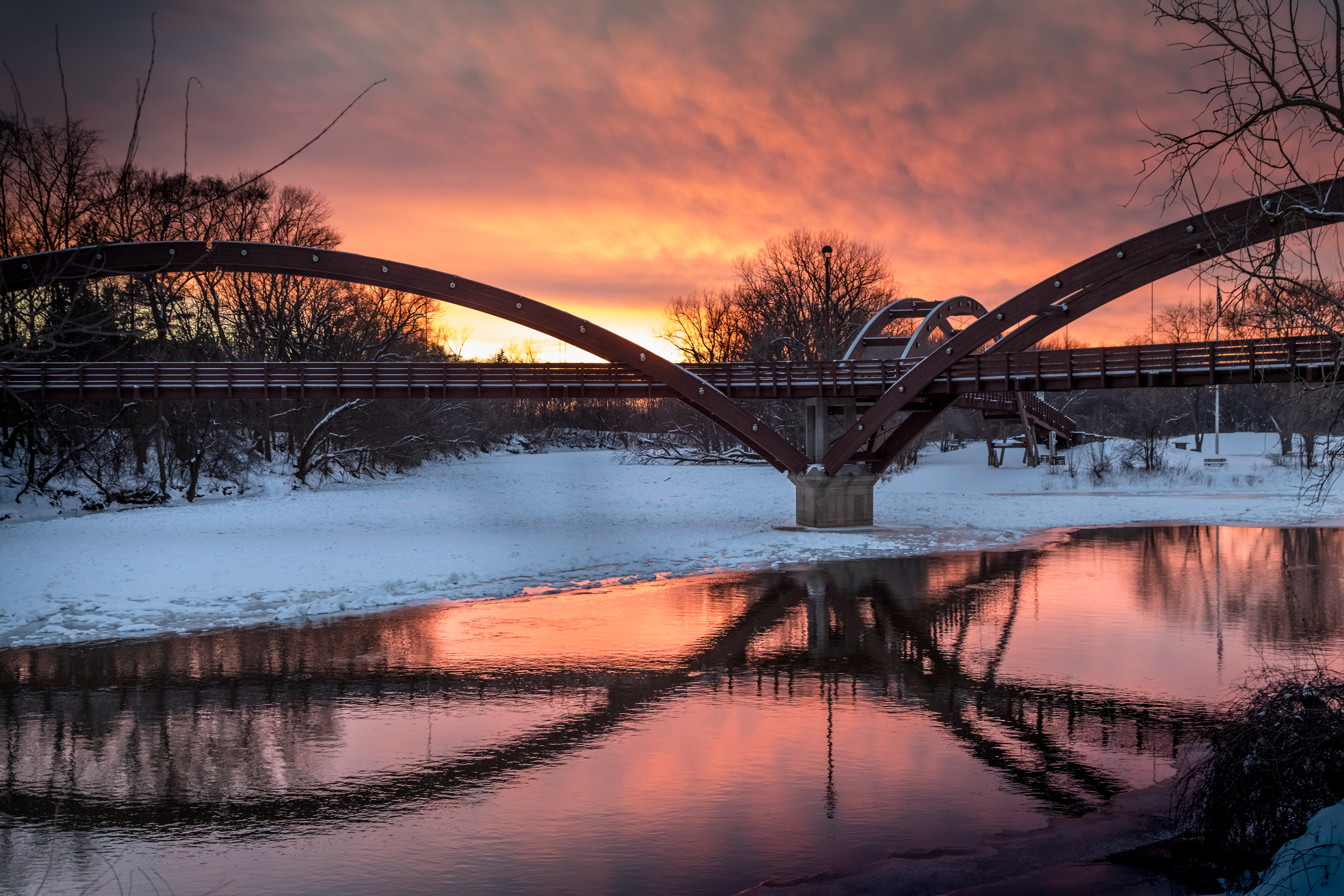
The Tridge in the winter.

The Tridge is a three-way wooden footbridge spanning the confluence of the Chippewa and Tittabawassee rivers. Named as a portmanteau of "tri" and "bridge", the structure opened in 1981. It consists of one 31-foot-tall (9.4 m) central pillar supporting three spokes. Each spoke is 180 feet (55 m) long by 8 feet (2.4 m) wide. It connects the park to the historic neighborhood of Midland and Towsley Dike Park. It is considered a tourist attraction.

=== Trilogy Skate Park ===
A 15,000 soft public skatepark for skateboards, inline skates, and bikes. It has a lighting system available for use.

== Events ==
The park has a sheltered area utilized for events and available for usage on a first come, first served basis.

=== River Days Festival ===
An annual free four-day festival featuring hot air balloons, children's activities, music, and food vendors.

== See also ==
- List of parks in Midland County, Michigan
