= Central Park (Midland, Michigan) =

Public park in Midland, Michigan, U.S.

- Location within Michigan Location within the United States
- Interactive map showing the location of Central Park
- Type: Public park
- Location: 410 East Nelson Street; Midland, Michigan
- Coordinates: 43°37′09″N 84°13′48″W
- Area: 18 acres (7.3 ha)
- Operator: City of Midland Parks and Recreation Department
- Open: Year round
- Status: Open

Central Park is one of the primary public parks in Midland, Michigan, United States. The 18 acres (7.3 ha) park features a playground, shell theater, baseball diamond, a human sundial, a Mid-Century Modern picnic pavilion and is home to the city's only public tennis and pickleball courts.

== Location ==
The park's 18 acres (7.3 ha) are located with a block surrounded by Rodd Street, East Collins Street, and East Nelson Street. It is located in the city's East End neighborhood within the Midtown area of Midland. Both King's Daughters Home and the Midland Community Center border the park.

== History ==
=== Swimming pool ===
The Central Park pool and bathhouse were constructed in 1938, projects of the Public Works Administration and designed by Alden Dow & Associates. It was located on Rodd Street between the Community Band Shell and King's Daughters Assisted living facility. Voters in Midland approved the construction of the Plymouth Park pool in 1966 due to overcrowding at the Central Park Pool. The aging pool was shuttered in the 1970s.

=== Band Shell ===
Nicholson-Guenther Community Band Shell is a shell theater designed by Alden B. Dow in 1938 and initially completed in 1939. It was part of a US$73,000 (equivalent to $1,669,681 in 2025) project by the Public Works Administration that included a since removed pool and bath house. The theater's concrete shell was reinforced with steel and had unique wooden baffles that helped project sound forward. It was rebuilt in 2012 in the design of the original structure. That is also when it received its current name, in recognition of Ted Nicholson and Lawrence Guenther. In addition to being home of the Chemical City Band, it is utilized by musical groups, nonprofits, community groups, and churches.

=== Tennis ===
In the 1950s, a children's wading area was constructed and tennis courts were added to the park. The city and the Greater Midland Tennis Center renovated the four courts in 2010.

=== Ice skating ===
A gift of $100,000 was donated to the city in the summer of 1954 to construct a concrete refrigerated ice rink in Central Park. The anonymous donor requested that it be 190 feet (58 m) in length, larger that the existing rink at Michigan State University. The ice rink was dedicated in February 1955; 1,500 people attended ceremony. Six years later, daily attendance was 175 skaters. Interest in figure skating soared when Peggy Fleming won the gold medal at the 1968 Winter Olympics. At the time, there was only one "Olympic size" ice skating rink in the United States: West Allis, Wisconsin, a Milwaukee suburb. Those builders were invited to make a sales presentation to the Midland City Council. Chamber of commerce members were there and representatives from six other Michigan cities. Midland chose to renovate, expand and upgrade the existing Central Park Ice Arena after an anonymous donor gifted $120,000 for the project in 1970. The ice rink was re-constructed and the brine coolant lines were replaced with Dowtherm ethylene glycol lines. One year later, another anonymous donation was made for an additional ice rink in Central Park. The gift was $150,000 in Dow Chemical Company stock to be split into three yearly payments. Construction began in September 1971 using the same design as the existing rink.

The Dow Foundation issued an $800,000 grant in September 1973 to build an enclosure for the ice rinks in Central Park. The Herbert H. and Grace A. Dow Foundation donated $1.7 million to create a recreation complex in the park. The design for a $2.235 million facility was approved and construction began in May 1975. Six months later, the skating rinks opened while construction continued for the rest of the complex. The pool was located at the site of the 1938 pool designed by Alden B. Dow. The completed Central Park Ice Arena opened in November 1976. In addition to the pool and locker rooms, a one-tenth mile speed-skating track became available. The name of the facility was changed to the Midland Civic Arena in the summer of 1979 to reflect the non-ice use.

=== Pavillion and sundial ===
A picnic pavillion was constructed in the mid-2010s using the Mid-century modern design found throughout Midland. It was funded by the Alden and Vada Dow Family Foundation, the Rollin M. Gerstacker Foundation, and the Charles J. Strosacker Foundation.

A human sundial structure was installed during the same timeframe, funded by an anonymous donor. It is an interactive, Analemmatic sundial where your own shadow acts as the clock hand (gnomon) to tell the time.

== Park master plan ==
A $230,000 master plan was created in 2017 and revised in April 2019. Projects included: improved park accessibility and parking, picnic shelters, walking trails, a barrier-free baseball field and new racquet courts. The Midland Parks and Recreation department secured a matching grant from the Michigan Natural Resources Trust Fund for $115,000. Local funding was provided by the Midland Area Community Foundation, the City of Midland Parks and Recreation, an anonymous donor, the Alden and Vada Dow Family Foundation, the Dow Chemical Company Foundation, the Michigan Baseball Foundation and the Midland Kiwanis Foundation. The existing court facility at Central Park was a single tennis court and four smaller kids courts. Being over 45 years old, it was not ADA accessible. The new courts were relocated to the park's south end, near the Midland Community Center. Pickleball had become popular in the late teens, so the decision was made to construct six pickleball courts and one tennis court.

=== Miracle Field ===
Miracle Field is an accessible soft surface baseball diamond for use by the public, including the cognitively or physically disabled. It is home to the Middle of the Mitt Miracle League. Its amenities include a 115 feet (35 m) rubberized baseball diamond, dugouts, bleachers, concession area and handicapped accessible playground. Construction began in the summer of 2021 and had a projected completion of April 2022.

=== Accessibility ===
Construction began in the Fall of 2023 to create a drop-off lane beside the city band shell and pathway to a concrete plaza at the front of the bandshell for individuals with mobility issues to attend events. Restroom facilities were also provided at the Bandshell, Miracle Field and the racquet courts.

== See also ==
- List of parks in Midland County, Michigan
