= Ypsilon (bridge) =

Ypsilon Bridge Ypsilonbrua
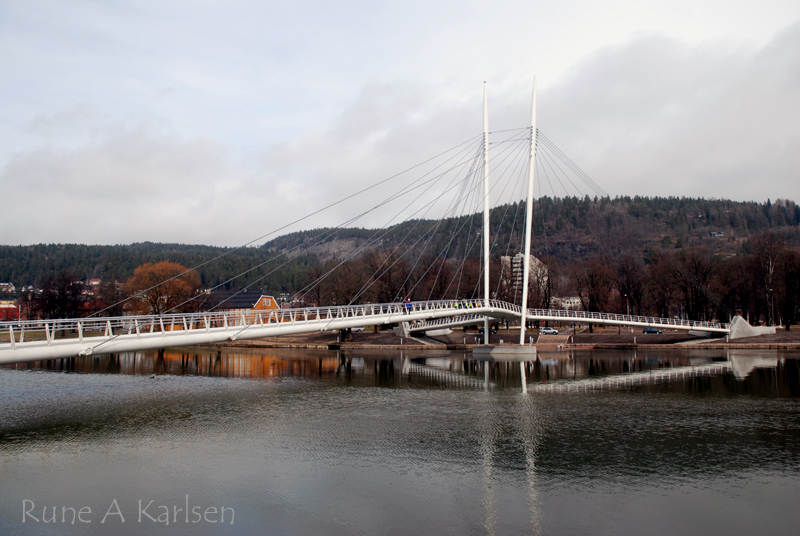
- The Ypsilon Bridge seen from the Strømsø side
- Coordinates: 59.744396°N 10.195313°E
- Carries: Pedestrians, cyclists
- Crosses: Drammenselva
- Locale: Drammen, Norway

Characteristics
- Design: Cable-stayed bridge
- Material: Steel
- Height: 47 meters
- Longest span: 90 meters
- No. of spans: 3
- Piers in water: 1
- Clearance below: 6 meters

History
- Designer: Arne Eggen
- Opened: 2008

The Ypsilon Bridge is a cable-stayed bridge over Drammenselva in Drammen, located in Buskerud in Norway.

The pedestrian bridge connects Kunnskapsparken, the science park of Grønland in Drammen with the city park on Bragernes. The bridge was designed by the firm of Arne Eggen Architects. The three-way bridge has been given the name "Ypsilon" due to its special form – from the air it looks like a Y, with one abutment on the Strømsø side and two at the Bragernes side. The project was co-funded by the municipality of Drammen and Kunnskapsparken AS. Kunnskapsparken accommodates the University of South-Eastern Norway with its campus Drammen, the public library of Drammen, and the Viken Regional Library.

== Gallery ==
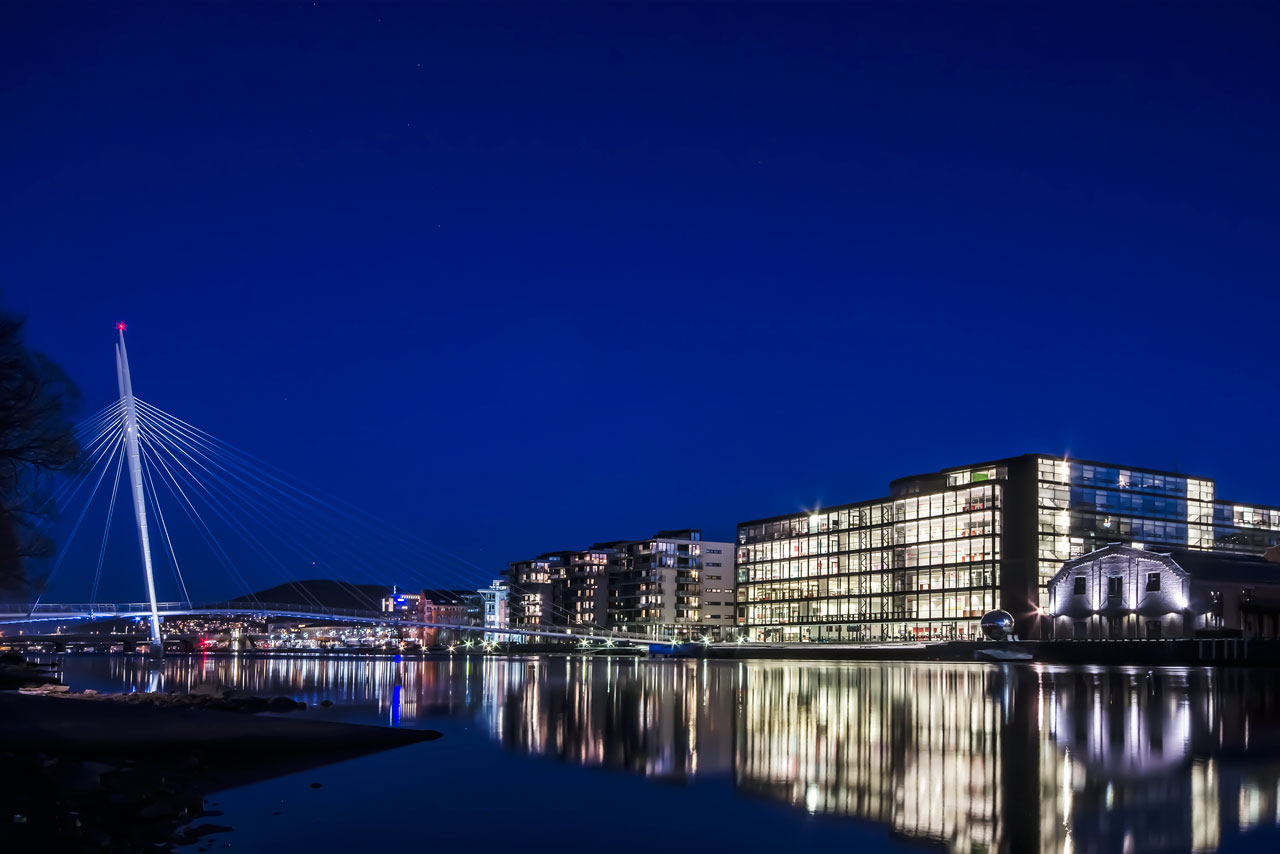
Ypsilon bridge and the University of South-Eastern Norway

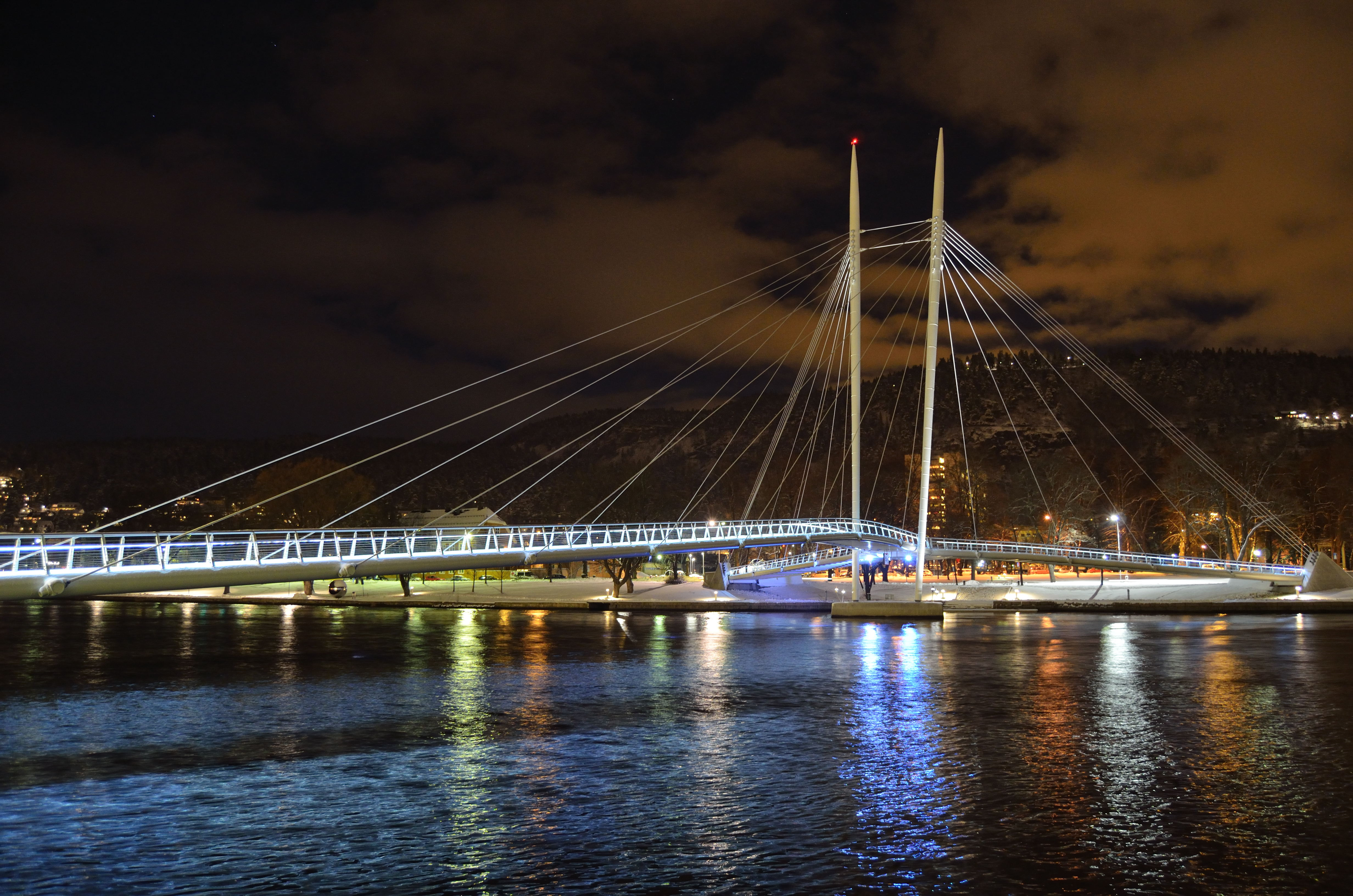
The Ypsilon Bridge seen from the Strømsø side at night

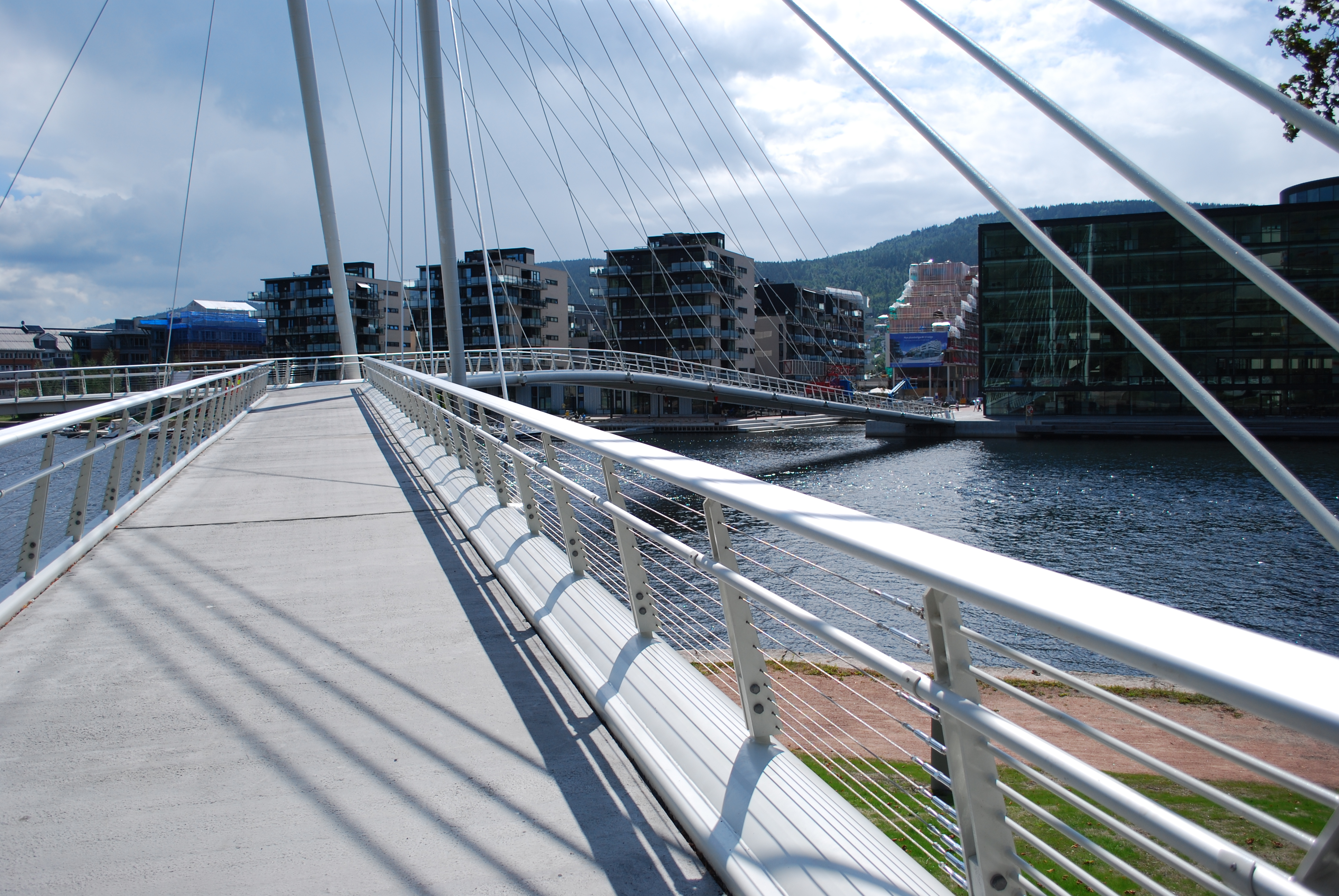
Close-up image

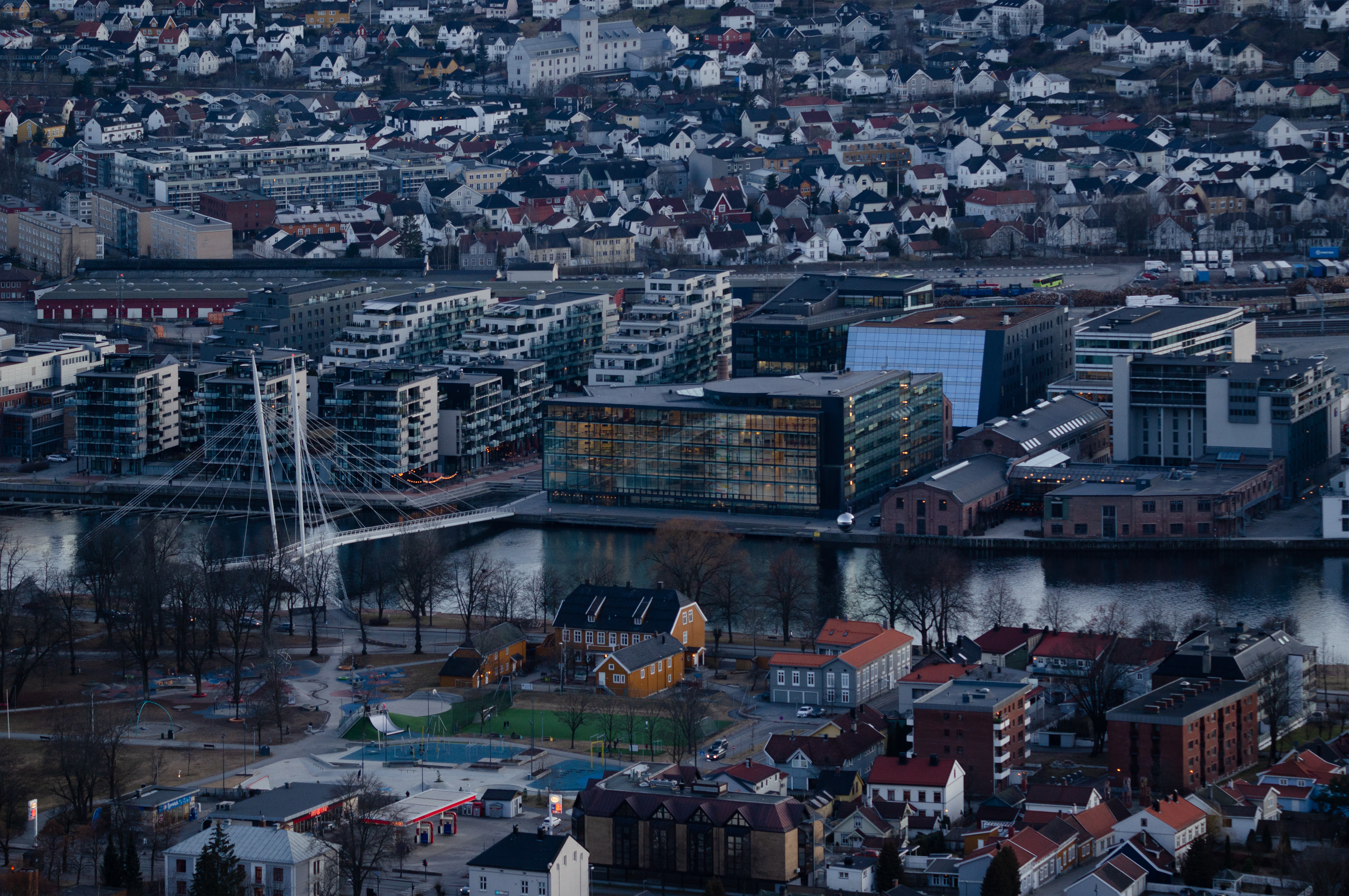
Aerial view of the Ypsilon bridge

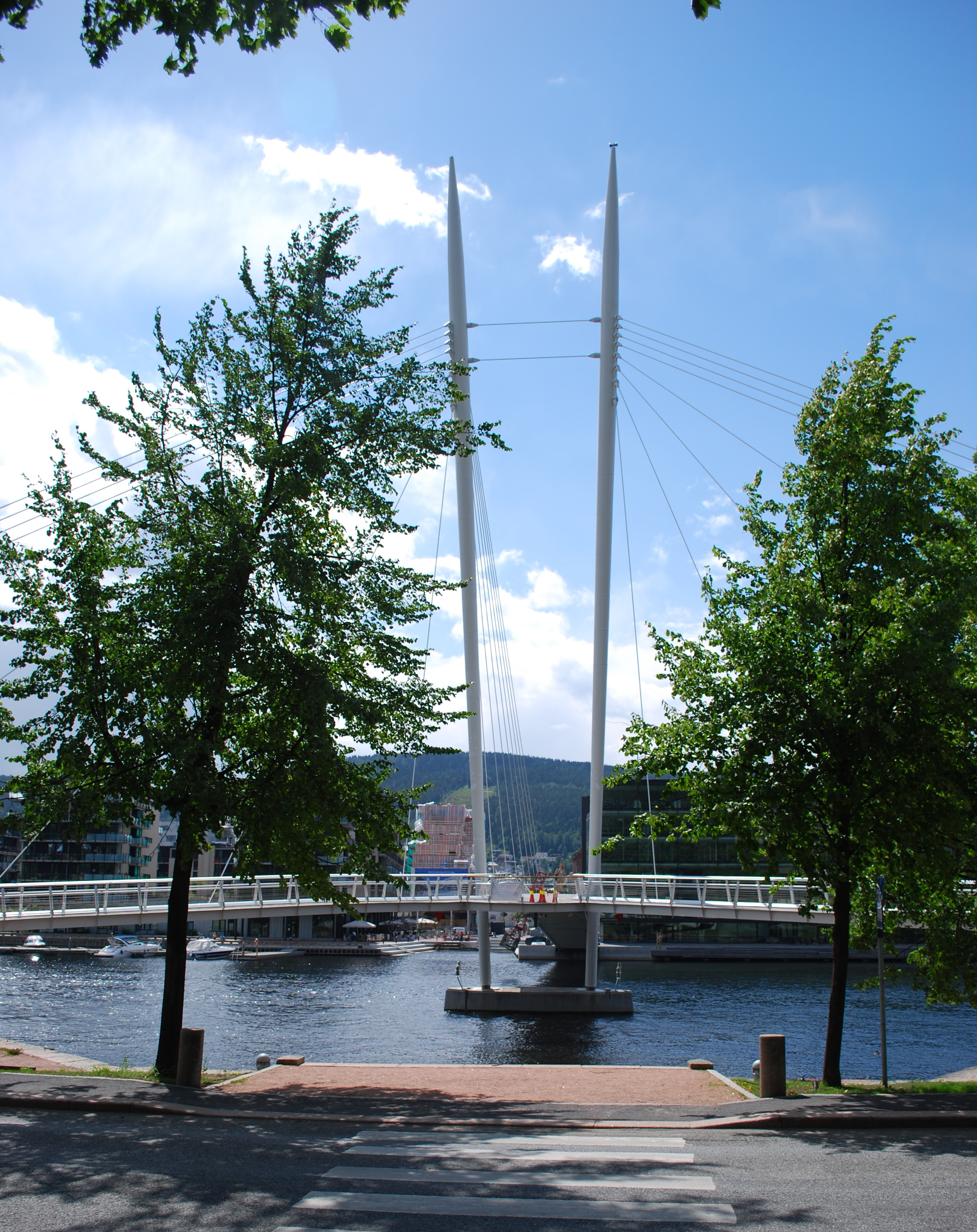
The Ypsilon Bridge seen from the Bragernes side

== See also ==
- List of bridges in Norway
- List of bridges in Norway by length
- List of bridges
- List of bridges by length
