= List of parks in Midland County, Michigan =

This is a list of parks in Midland County, Michigan.

== Parks within the City of Midland ==
These parks are within the county's largest city, Midland.

Major parks are Bold; Community parks are Italicized; Special (single) use parks are underlined; Open space/unimproved parks are indented; the rest are Neighborhood parks.

- Adams Park
- Allen Park
- Ann M. Winger Park
- Arbury Centennial Park
- Barstow Woods Park
- Birchwood Park
- Blake Park
- Briarwood Park
- Burlington Park
- Caldwell Boat Launch
- Castle Park
- Central Park
- Chatham Park
- Chestnut Hill Park
- Chippewa Banks Disc Golf
- Chippewa Nature Center
- Chippewa Trail
- Chippewassee Park
  - Midland Dog Park
  - Trilogy Skate Park
- Chippewassee School Park
- City Forest
- Cleveland Park
- Cook Elementary School Park
- Crane Park
- Currie Golf Course
- Currie-Bennett Park
- Dahlia Hill
- Dartmoor Park
- Dartmouth Park
- Devonshire Park
- Emerson Park
- Fournie Park
- Garden Park
- Gerstacker Spray Park
- Glencoe Park
- Glenoak Park
- Greenfield Park
- Griese Park
- Grove Park
- Hart Park
- Hillgrove Park
- Hintz Park
- Huron Park
- Kaufman Park
- Kent Park
- Lalkwood Park
- Lincoln Park
- Longacres Park
- Longview Spray Park
- Lowell Park
- Mac Park
- Manor Park
- Maryland Park
- Meadowbrook Park
- Nelson Park
- Noeske Park
- Northwest Little League Complex
- Oak Park
- Optimist Park
- Orchard Park
- Ottawa Park
- Parkdale Park
- Parkwood Park
- Pere Marquette Rail-Trail
  - Pine River Park
- Plymouth Park
- Putnam Park
- Redcoat Softball Complex (formerly St. Charles)
- Revere Park
- River Bend Park
- Riverside/Golfside Park
- Russell Park
- Shipps Family Park
- Siebert Park
- Smith-Barstow Park
- St. Mary's Park
- Stratford Woods Park
  - Sturgeon Creek Park
- Sunset Park
- Theis Park
- Thrune Park
- Tittabawassee River Overlook
  - Tittabawassee Riverfront
  - Towsley Dike Park
- Valley Park
- Virginia Park
- Wallen Park
- Washington Woods Park
- Wyllys Park
- Wyndemere Park

== County parks ==
County parks outside the City of Midland include:

- Laur Big Salt River Park
- Manitou Park
- Pine Haven Recreational Area
- River Trails Heritage Park
- Sanford Lake Park
- Veterans Memorial Park
