= Chippewa Nature Center =

Charity and protected area in Michigan, US

- Chippewa Nature Center logo

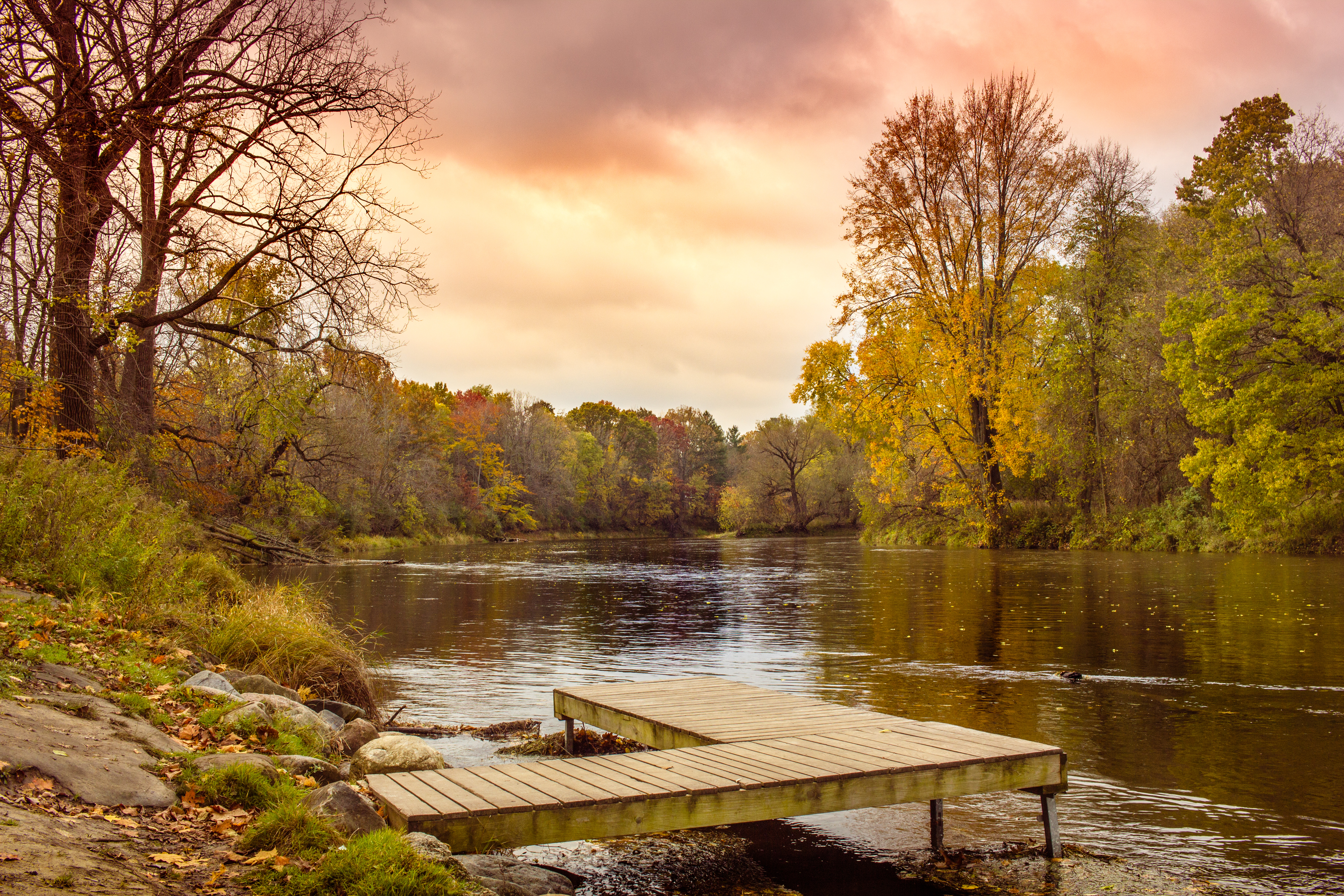
- Canoe dock at Chippewa Nature Center
- Founded: April 11, 1966; 60 years ago
- Founder: Eugene Kenaga, Mark Wolf, Virginia Kolb, Howard Garrett, Lawrence Southwick and Charles Lanigan
- Type: Educational
- Location: 400 South Badour Road
- Origins: Midland Nature Club
- Region served: Tri-Cities (Michigan)
- Members: 1,581
- Key people: Dennis Pilaske, Executive Director
- Revenue: $2.1 million
- Employees: 40
- Volunteers: 300
- Website: www.chippewanaturecenter.org
- Formerly called: Nature Day Camp
Chippewa Nature Center
- Location within Michigan Location within the United States
- Interactive map showing the location of Chippewa Nature Center
- Location: Homer Township, Midland County, Michigan, US
- Nearest city: Midland, Michigan
- Coordinates: 43°35′59″N 84°17′13″W
- Area: 1,500 acres (6.1 km^{2})
- Established: November 21, 1965
- Visitors: 50,000 (in 2012)
- Governing body: Chippewa Nature Center, Inc.

Chippewa Nature Center (CNC) is both a 501(c)(3) non-profit educational organization and a protected wildlife area in the Lower Peninsula of Michigan, encompassing over 1,500 acres (6.1 km^{2}) of forest, rivers and wetlands. Located in Midland County, it is one of the largest and most prominent private non-profit nature centers in the United States.

== History ==
The Midland Nature Club began discussions about the need for a local nature center in 1963. The following year, the club reached out to the Herbert H. and Grace A. Dow Foundation for support of a separate nature center. The foundation owned a 198-acre parcel where the Pine River joined the Chippewa River that would be an ideal location. The new organization was granted a ten-year lease for the land, which was later expanded to include eight other properties as new programs were added by the center.

A Nature Day Camp was offered in the summer of 1966 and is the center's longest running program. A Nature Study Building, designed by architect Alden B. Dow, was dedicated in 1967 and serves as the home of the day camp program. During 1968, the CNC and Midland Public Schools joined forces to develop the Cooperative Environmental Education Program. Gradually, adult and family programs were created, which required more facility than the one building. Planning began, and the Dow Chemical Company Foundation gave $1 million for that purpose. Ground was broken in 1973, and eighteen months later, the Interpretive Building was dedicated. The structure contained a wildlife viewing area, classrooms, an auditorium and space for exhibits and offices. It was renamed the Visitor Center years later.

When the property lease ended in 1975, the land was given to the CNC by the Herbert and Grace Dow Foundation. Through the years, the center has received generous support from members of the community and area foundations from people, which allowed the CNC to grow and expand its curriculum of nature and environmental programs.

== Facilities and activities ==
The 19 miles (31 km) of trails are open year-round from dawn til dark and there is no admission to the Visitor Center and trails. Many programs are free or the fee is nominal. In winter, cross-country skiing and snowshoeing are encouraged. The center offers educational programs for everyone, ranging from preschool to senior adults, and their property includes over three miles of shoreline along the Pine and Chippewa Rivers. The Oxbow pond was a loop in the Chippewa River until the force of water in the flood of 1912 cut through the riverbank and left an isolated U-shaped river section. The rest of the ponds on CNC property are manmade.

=== Buildings ===
- The Visitor Center has several attractions. The Nature Center Store sells books, merchandise and gifts connected to the Nature Center. The Naturalist Station is staffed by a knowledgeable individual who can answer almost any question about the outdoors. The River Overlook permits an unobstructed view of the Pine River through floor-to-ceiling windows. The Bur Oak Theater projects several different short videos. The Ecosystem Gallery, including a live Reptile and Amphibian Exhibit, and the Wildlife Viewing Area feature "hands-on" exhibits of the different types of ecosystems found at the center, and portrays animals in their natural habitats.
- The Margaret Ann (Ranny) Riecker Nature Preschool Center and the Alden B. Dow designed Nature Study building house Nature Preschool, one of only 40 in the United States, and offers age-appropriate learning for 3- and 4-year-olds.
- A Nature Day Camp has been offered every summer since 1966 and is available for children aged 3–16. Kids also go to school camps that they can learn a lot about.
- A wigwam was constructed in 1998, and it is the center for demonstrations of Native American skills such as animal hide tanning, cord making, and flint knapping.
- Bird banding at CNC began in 2004 and is a summer activity in favorable weather at the wetlands. The CNC partners with the Michigan Bird Banding Association.
- The CNC has a sugar bush which produces the sap required for maple syrup. An old farmhouse built in 1868 was disassembled, moved to CNC property, reassembled, and converted into a sugar shack to process the sap using a wood-fired evaporator. A cupola was constructed to allow steam from the boiling sap to escape.

=== Trails ===
- The Chippewa trail runs 3.5 miles from the Tridge in downtown Midland to the CNC. Bicycles and other non-motorized wheeled conveyances (skateboards, razors, inline skates) can be ridden on the Chippewa Trail, but not within the nature center. Natural, cultural and historical features along the paved path are explained by interpretive signage and benches are provided for rest and reflection.
- The Arboretum trail has two sections: Specimen trees are grouped to show the different varieties that exist within a plant family; Community trees are clustered as examples of trees included in a forest type, such as Northern Hardwood or Aspen Successional.
- The Homestead trail passes the 1870 homestead farm area which includes a log cabin, barn, root cellar, tool shed, chicken coop, wagon barn, outhouse and hand pump. The staff plants heirloom vegetables and herb gardens each year, in addition to raising cattle, sheep, pigs and chickens. Just down the trail from the homestead is an 1870 one-room schoolhouse. A food bank in Midland was given more than 600 pounds of organic produce over the season.
- The Wetlands trail is 1.7 miles through marsh and remnant bog, utilizing boardwalks and docks to show several types of ecosystems.
- The River trail runs beside the Chippewa River and shows an old riverbed.
- The Ridge trail follows the sandy ridge of an ancient lake and shows fields that are becoming woodlands.
- The wildflower walkway has native Michigan wildflowers from late spring to early fall.

== Wildlife ==
Among the birds typically seen along riparian corridors are: kingfishers, pileated woodpeckers, wood ducks, warblers, bald eagles, great horned and barred owls. Mammals present in and around the water include: North American river otters, American mink, beavers, muskrats, and raccoons; all are active at dawn and dusk. Also common are deer, woodchucks, chipmunks and squirrels.

== Fundraising ==
In 2012, income from memberships, donations, and program fees covered less than half of the center's $2 million budget. Special fundraising activities were conducted throughout the year, which included maple syrup production; facility rentals; the Banff Mountain Film Festival World Tour; "Tapas, Toasts & Tunes Gala" plus silent auction; native plant sale; and the inscribed brick paver sale.

The budget shortfall of over $1.3 million was resolved with a supplement from their endowment, but the center is looking for other income streams to avoid depleting endowed funds.

== Research ==
The Chippewa Nature Center works with scientific groups for research projects on CNC property if the purpose of the study is in the best interest of the center. These projects have included: Land Inventory of fauna and flora, Michigan Department of Natural Resources Frog and Toad Surveys, Butterfly Counts, Deer Survey & Harvest, Invasive Exotics control, Bird Banding, Michigan State University Toxicology Study of wildlife within the Tittabawassee river basin, Dow Chemical Company Sediment Testing in the Chippewa and Tittabawassee rivers, University of Michigan Ash Disease Study, Monarch Larva Monitoring Project, and United States Fish and Wildlife Service Lamprey Control.

== Renovation ==
The CNC commissioned Kubala Washatko Architects to develop a master plan for the renovation and expansion of the center using standards for environmentally sustainable construction developed by the United States Green Building Council. The Visitor Center received a major renovation in 2010 which gives the structure 50,000 ft^{2}. The new Margaret Ann (Ranny) Riecker Nature Preschool Center was constructed as a green building with the support of a $1 million grant from the Gerstacker Foundation, which has given over $2 million to CNC. The Dow Chemical Company Foundation also donated money and several hundred thousand dollars of building products toward the project. The structure received a LEED Gold Certification, the first in Midland and only the eighth LEEDS certification in the Great Lakes Region.

The structure has a capacity of 88 students and incorporates many features for energy efficiency: Solar panels generate 10 kW of electricity, and water is heated through solar collectors for domestic use. Dual-flush toilets conserve water. Windows and overhangs are positioned to provide ambient lighting, and windows open to provide natural ventilation. Structural insulated panels were used to lower HVAC costs and shorten construction times. Rainwater from the roof is collected in underground barrels for use in irrigation. Cooling and heating utilize energy-saving geothermal radiant floor systems.

== See also ==
- List of parks in Midland County, Michigan
