= Y-Bridge (Zanesville, Ohio) =

- Y Bridge
- U.S. National Register of Historic Places
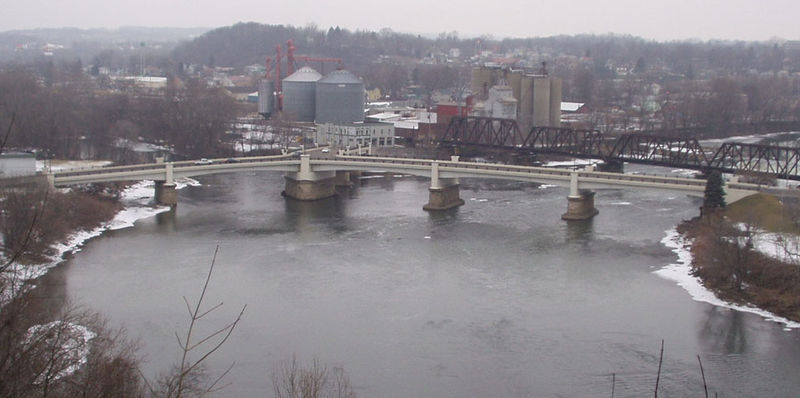
- The Zanesville Y-Bridge, seen from a high bluff south of the river confluence.

- Location within Ohio Location within the United States
- Location: US 40; at foot of Main Street and Linden Avenue, over the Licking and Muskingum rivers, Zanesville, Ohio
- Coordinates: 39°56′25.5″N 82°0′51.5″W
- Area: 2 acres (0.81 ha)
- Built: 1902
- NRHP reference No.: 73001516
- Added to NRHP: November 2, 1973

The Zanesville Y-Bridge is a historic Y-shaped three-way bridge that spans the confluence of the Licking and Muskingum Rivers in downtown Zanesville, Ohio. It carries the traffic of U.S. Route 40 (Main Street and West Main Street), as well as Linden Avenue.

== History ==
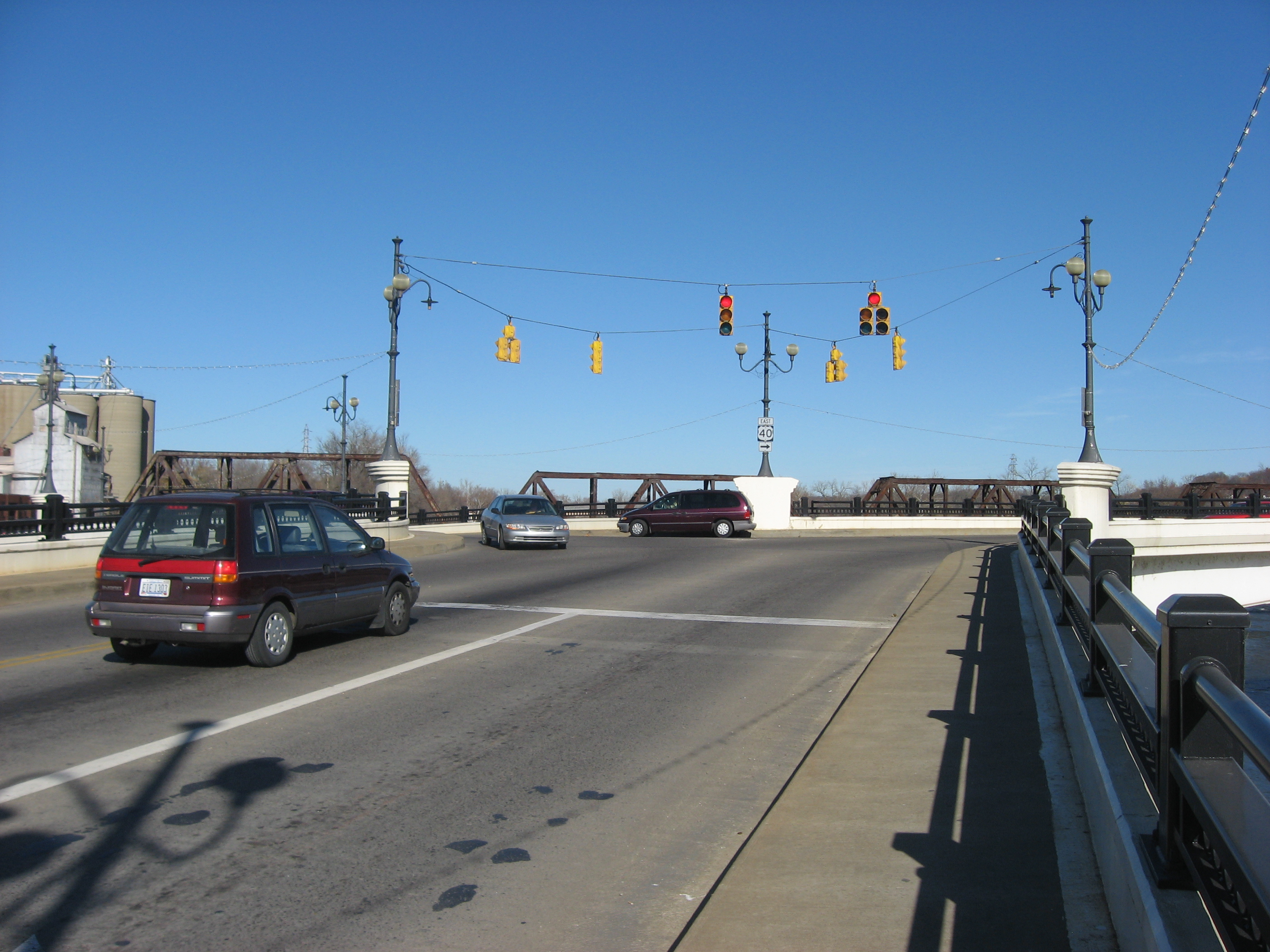
Intersection at the middle of the bridge

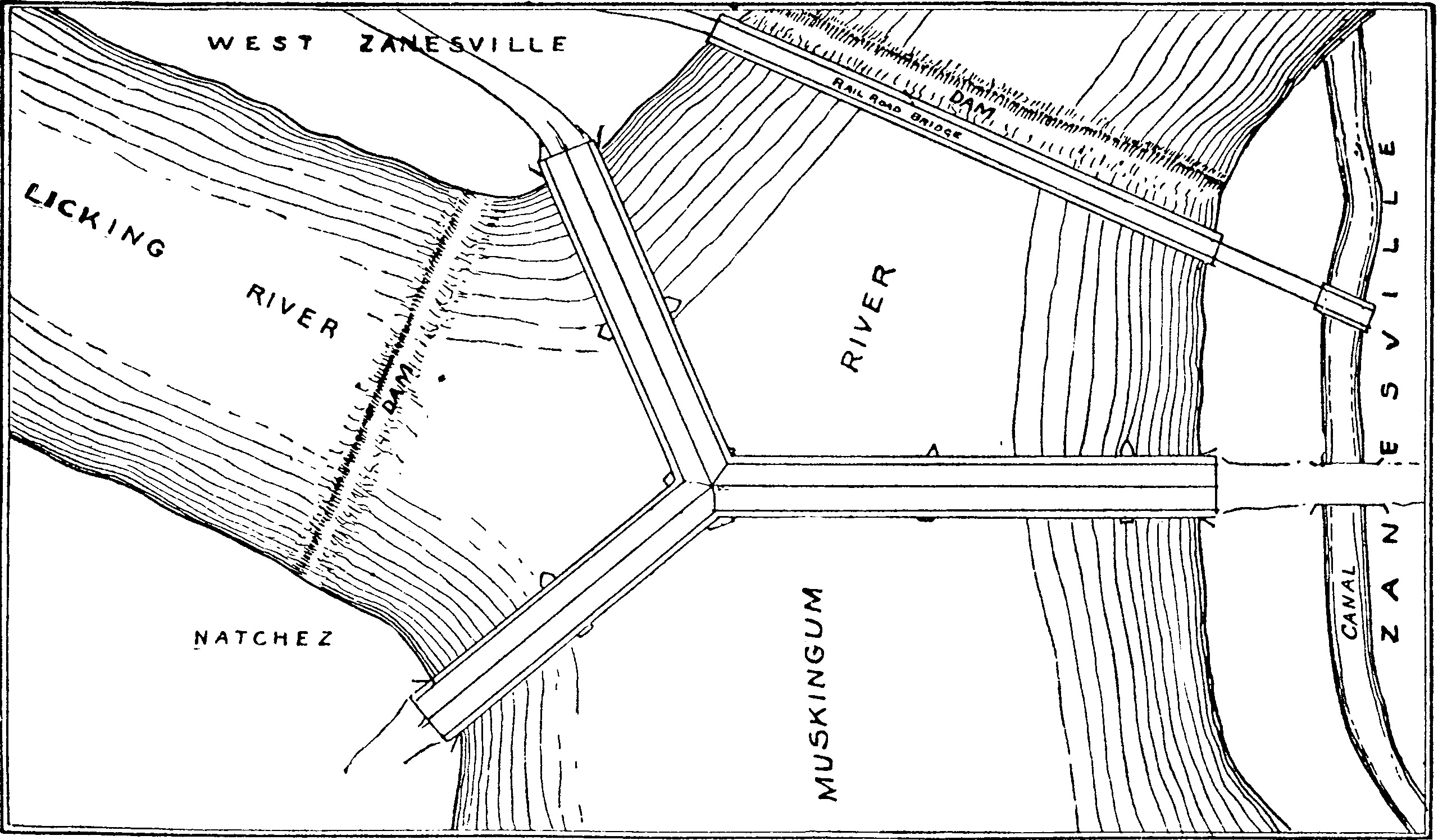
Y-Bridge drawing in the 1890s when it was a wooden covered bridge.

The flow of Muskingum has been regulated by a series of dams and locks since the mid-19th century. Before the regulation serious floods often occurred, which washed away or weakened the earliest bridges.

The first Zanesville Y-Bridge was constructed in 1814. The trestle bridge stood for four years. The second wooden bridge was erected in 1819. New roads were built in the area and traffic increased. A winter flood in 1831–1832 weakened the second bridge to be unsafe for the increased traffic. A third iteration, a wooden covered bridge was completed in 1832 and stood until 1900.

The next bridge opened in early 1902. It had concrete balustrade railings which were lost to the 1913 flood and replaced with pipe railings. The fourth bridge was deemed unsafe in 1979. After demolition it was found that only one of the three segments needed actual replacement, the other spans would have needed only surface repairs.

The current concrete and steel bridge, a multi-way bridge, is the fifth in the series on the same location. It opened in 1984. While being a relief to traffic and the citizens, it has received criticism for a tunnel-like effect due to its solid railings, providing hardly any view of the scenery.

The bridge is listed on the National Register of Historic Places. It was listed in 1973, before the fourth bridge was replaced by the fifth.

== See also ==
- List of bridges documented by the Historic American Engineering Record in Ohio
- National Register of Historic Places listings in Muskingum County, Ohio
