= Midland Civic Arena =

Indoor arena in Midland, Michigan

- Interactive map of Midland Civic Arena
- Location: 405 Fast Ice Drive, Midland, Michigan, US
- Coordinates: 43°36′11″N 84°10′33″W
- Owner: City of Midland, Michigan
- Operator: City of Midland, Michigan
- Capacity: 1,000
- Surface: ice
- Facilities: 3 Ice rinks: 2 NHL 200 ft × 85 ft (61 m × 26 m); 1 Olympic 200 ft × 100 ft (61 m × 30 m); 107,000 square feet (9,900 m^{2})

Construction
- Groundbreaking: September 2004
- Opened: September 6, 2005
- Cost: $11 million
- Builder: Three Rivers Corp.

Tenants
- youth & high school hockey, public skaters, figure & speed skaters

Website
- www.midlandcivicarena.com

Midland Civic Arena is a 1,000-seat indoor arena located in Midland, Michigan. This three-rink arena is used primarily for hockey and ice skating and opened in 2005. High school and youth hockey regularly takes place here. The arena is managed by former professional hockey player, Bob Scurfield.

== History ==
=== Central Park ===
Ice was always available for skating and hockey in Midland during the winter months on frozen ponds, rivers or a flooded field. A gift of $100,000 was donated to the city in the summer of 1954 to construct a concrete refrigerated ice rink in Central Park. The anonymous donor requested that it be 190 feet (58 m) in length, larger that the existing rink at Michigan State University. The ice rink was dedicated in February 1955; 1,500 people attended the Sunday dedication. Six years later, daily attendance was 175 skaters every day. Interest in figure skating soared when Peggy Fleming won the gold medal at the 1968 Winter Olympics. At the time, there was only one "Olympic size" rink in the United States: West Allis, Wisconsin, a Milwaukee suburb. Those builders were invited to make a sales presentation to the Midland City Council. Chamber of commerce members were there and representatives from six other Michigan cities. Midland chose to renovate, expand and upgrade the existing Central Park Ice Arena after an anonymous donor gifted $120,000 for the project in 1970. The ice rink was re-constructed and the brine coolant lines were replaced with Dowtherm ethylene glycol lines. One year later, another anonymous donation was made for an additional ice rink in Central Park. The gift was $150,000 in Dow Chemical Company stock to be split into three yearly payments. Construction began in September 1971 using the same design as the existing rink.

The Dow Foundation issued an $800,000 grant in September 1973 to build an enclosure for the ice rinks in Central Park. The Herbert H. and Grace A. Dow Foundation donated $1.7 million to create an indoor skating and swimming complex in Central Park. The design for a $2.235 million facility was approved and construction began in May 1975. Six months later, the skating rinks opened while construction continued for the rest of the complex. The pool was located at the site of the 1938 pool designed by Alden B. Dow. The completed Central Park Ice Arena opened in November 1976. In addition to the pool and locker rooms, a speed-skating track at one-tenth mile became available. The name of the facility was changed to the Midland Civic Arena in the summer of 1979 to reflect the non-ice use.

By 1980, it was discovered that the building's roof was defective, resulting in roof leaks, shifting floors and ice problems. Discussions between the principals did not reach a resolution, so a lawsuit was filed by the City of Midland in July 1982 against the local architects. Litigation lasted for more than six years with the Michigan Court of Appeals sending the suit back to Midland, where a jury awarded the city $145,000. Accumulated interest during the appeals increased the payment to $322,000.

The rinks at the arena were fully utilized, with long waiting lists for ice time. In the Summer of 1997 the city began to disuss possibilities. A $5,000 study was paid for by the Midland Amateur Hockey League. The study was completed in Fall, suggessting that the pool could be converted to another rink, but the cost was estimated at $4.6 million. It would cost $1.59 million for the pool replacement in the park. No decision was made. As the new millenium began, the city was still debating their options. The city hired an outside management consultant from Ann Arbor to make recommendations.

=== Bay City Road ===
In January 2004, after waffling for years, a decision was finally made. The city council hired architects to begin designing a new Midland Civic Arena facility and fund the $10.3 million price tag. Midland developers Nicolaos and Elaine Rapanos donated the land on Bay City Road for the new location. Local foundations pledged $3.23 million, the Fast Ice user group and the city each promised $750,000 with municipal bonds covering the remainder.

In the Summer of 2004, Three Rivers Corporation of Midland's bid was $8.3 million, almost $1 million below the next bidder. Additional costs including site preparation, utilities, architectural design and engineering, equipment and furnishings increased the total, but the project stayed within the budget. Otherwise, the third rink might have been cut.

=== Old facility ===
Following the move to the new Bay City Road rinks, the city had to decide the fate of the nearly 30-year old structure in Central Park. Residents suggested a bicycle velodrome, baseball batting cages, a skatepark, a softball facility, a children's playscape and climbing wall or sports centers for soccer, rugby, lacrosse or touch football. The city had no money available and there was a $2 million estimate to fix the roof and retrofit HVAC, electrical and lighting. Yearly operating costs and debt were projected at $350,000 per year. Demolition costs of the old building were included in the current project. Demolition began in early February 2007 and was expected to take six to eight weeks.

=== Improvements ===
The facility, normally open year-round, closed for maintenance work on June 1, 2026. During the summer, the arena installed upgrades that included ADA accessibility in restrooms, emergency lighting fixtures and new ice plant controls. The arena reopened prior to September 8, 2026.
