= Plymouth Park (Midland, Michigan) =

Public park in Midland, Michigan, United States

- Location within Michigan Location within the United States
- Interactive map showing the location of Plymouth Park
- Type: Public park
- Location: 1508 East Wheeler Street; Midland, Michigan
- Coordinates: 43°38′20″N 84°12′33″W
- Area: 40 acres (16 ha)
- Operator: City of Midland Parks and Recreation Department
- Open: Year round
- Status: Open

Plymouth Park is one of the largest developed public parks in Midland, Michigan, United States. The park, approximately 40 acres (16 ha), is located in the city's Plymouth Park neighborhood within the North Side area. It features a playground, sports fields, and a community pool.

== Location ==
The park's 40 acres (16 ha) are located along Plymouth Park Drive between East Wheeler Street and East Sugnet Road. It is located in the city's Plymouth Park neighborhood within the North Side area of Midland. Both Plymouth Elementary School and Northeast Middle School are located along the park's southern border. There is a white, elevated water storage tank containing 1,000,000 US gallons (3,800,000 L; 830,000 imp gal) located at the northeast corner of the park.

== Features ==
There is one large shelter/picnic area and two medium ones, available for reservation by the public. In addition to a large playing field, the park includes a Beach volleyball pit and a large grass playfield. It also includes baseball fields utilized by Midland Northeast Little League.

=== Fun Zone ===
Plymouth Park features a 16,000 square feet (1,500 m^{2}) wooden playground constructed by the local community. Originally built by hundreds of volunteers in 1994, it was renovated in 2014 to celebrate its 20th anniversary.

=== Plymouth Pool ===
Voters in Midland approved the construction of a new pool in 1966 due to overcrowding at the Central Park Pool, built in 1938. The 50-meter pool had a capacity of 400 swimmers and included a 12-foot-deep extension and 3-foot-deep shallow extension. The deep end originally had one-meter and three-meter diving boards which were replaced by a water slide due to EGLE’s safety standards and liability concerns. The Central Park Pool was designed by Midland architecture firm Alden Dow & Associates but demolished in 2008.

The park now provides Midland's only outdoor community pool, also designed by Alden Dow & Associates. The pool features water slides and changing facilities. It is open annually from mid-June through Labor Day. The pool was renovated in 2025 and the deep extension was raised to 7.5 feet (2.3 m). The shallow extension was changed to a zero entry pool with spray features and a Splash pad.

== See also ==
- List of parks in Midland County, Michigan
