= The Tridge (Midland, Michigan) =

Three-way bridge in Michigan, US

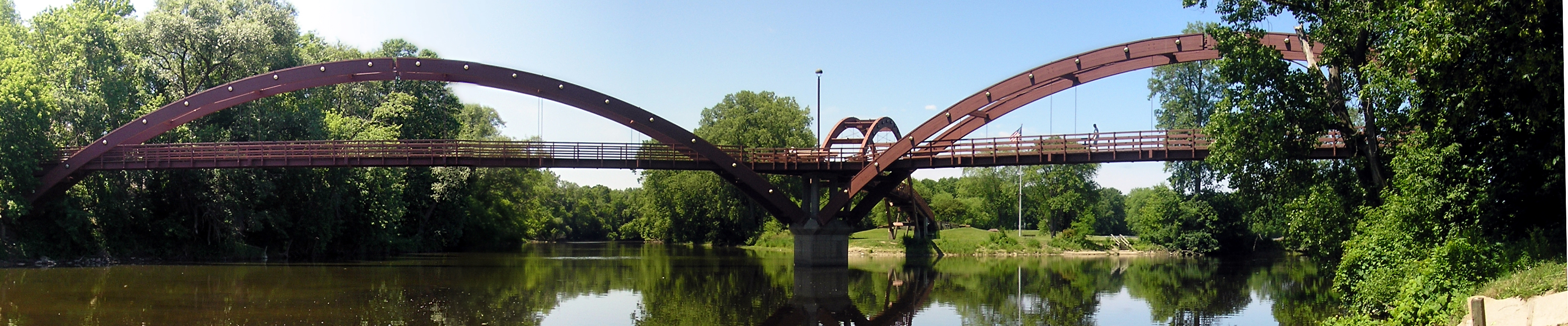
- The Tridge in downtown Midland
- Coordinates: 43.611052°N 84.248689°W
- Carries: Pedestrian and bicycle traffic
- Crosses: Chippewa River and Tittabawassee River confluence
- Locale: Chippewassee Park, Midland, Michigan, United States

Characteristics
- Design: Three-way suspended deck arch bridge
- Material: Wood

History
- Construction cost: $732,000
- Opened: October 4, 1981

Location
- Interactive map of The Tridge

The Tridge is the formal name of a three-way wooden footbridge spanning the confluence of the Chippewa and Tittabawassee Rivers in Chippewassee Park near downtown Midland, Michigan, in the Tri-Cities region. Named as a portmanteau of "tri" and "bridge", the structure opened on October 4, 1981. It consists of one 31-foot (9.4 m) tall central pillar supporting three spokes. Each spoke is 180 feet (55 m) long by 8 feet (2.4 m) wide.

== History ==
Construction on the bridge began on May 14, 1981, at the instigation of the Midland Area Community Foundation (MACF). The bridge cost US$732,000 (equivalent to $2,592,277 in 2025) to build, and took 6,400 hours of labor. Ten railroad car loads of prefabricated wood, and 337 cubic yards (258 m^{3}) of concrete were used to construct three arches, which weigh 44,000 pounds (20,000 kg) apiece. Each appendage is 180 by 8 feet (54.9 by 2.4 m). The Tridge was designed by Commonwealth Associates of Jackson and built for a design load of 85 pounds per square foot of deck area and to handle 1,500 people at a time. Gerace Construction Company worked on the project. As a symbol, the bridge has been popularized and is the subject, for example, of lithographs.

The Tridge was closed in November 2011 due to work on the rails-to-trails project and the construction of a new canoe launch site.

In April 2017, the Tridge was closed for renovations with all stain to be removed and restained and some board replacements. The bridge's full reopening would happen in October with a partial reopening on the Fourth of July. The Rollin M. Gerstacker Foundation donated US$2,500,000 (equivalent to $3,283,668 in 2025) towards the project.

== Recreation ==
The Tridge is a tourist attraction. It and its two surrounding parks—35 acres (14 ha) in Chippewassee and St. Charles parks—are one of the most popular leisure areas downtown. The 3.5-mile (5.6 km) Chippewa Nature Trail begins at the bridge.

The site also marks the starting point of the Pere Marquette Rail Trail, a Michigan Rails to Trails Conservancy Hall of Fame trail. Although being mainly a footbridge, bicycles, skateboards, and in-line skates are also allowed on the bridge. It is the focal point for summer evening concerts. Fishing is generally not permitted from the bridge although it does occur frequently.

The Tridge, located beside the Midland farmers market, has become an icon of the city and is the most famous landmark of the downtown area. Each year, the Tridge mimics the Mackinac Bridge to the north, in hosting a "Labor Day walk". The festive annual event is sponsored by MACF and the Chippewa Nature Center, and led by the mayor of Midland. In addition, St. Charles Park, which surrounds the Tridge, is host to many public and private events. At night, the bridge's arches are lit.

During summer evenings, the Tridge is a popular hangout spot for local teens largely because it is near the Downtown area and several popular areas. The Trilogy Skate Park is located just 300 feet (91 m) north of the Tridge in Chippewassee Park.

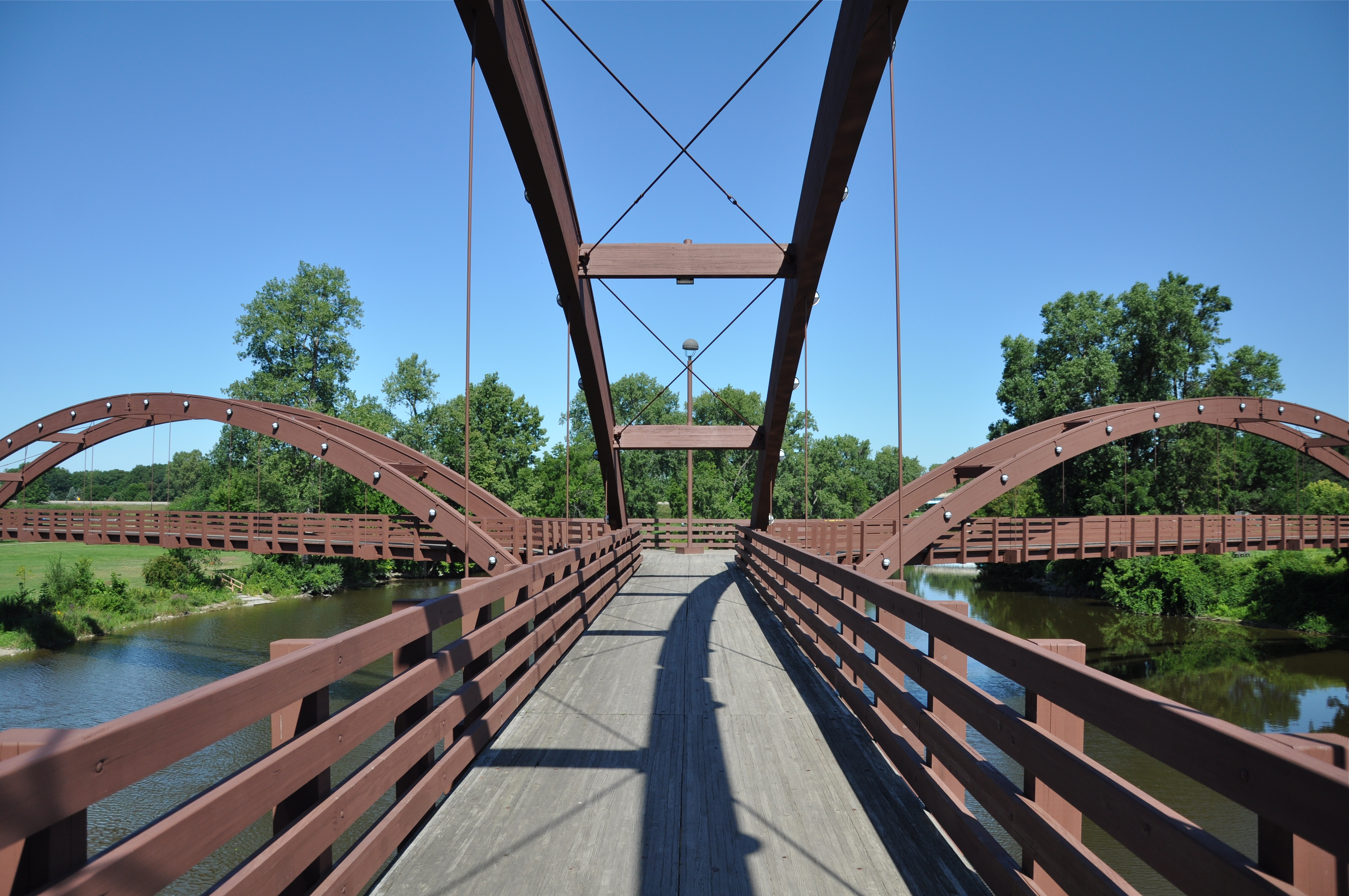
Tridge is a 3-way bridge.

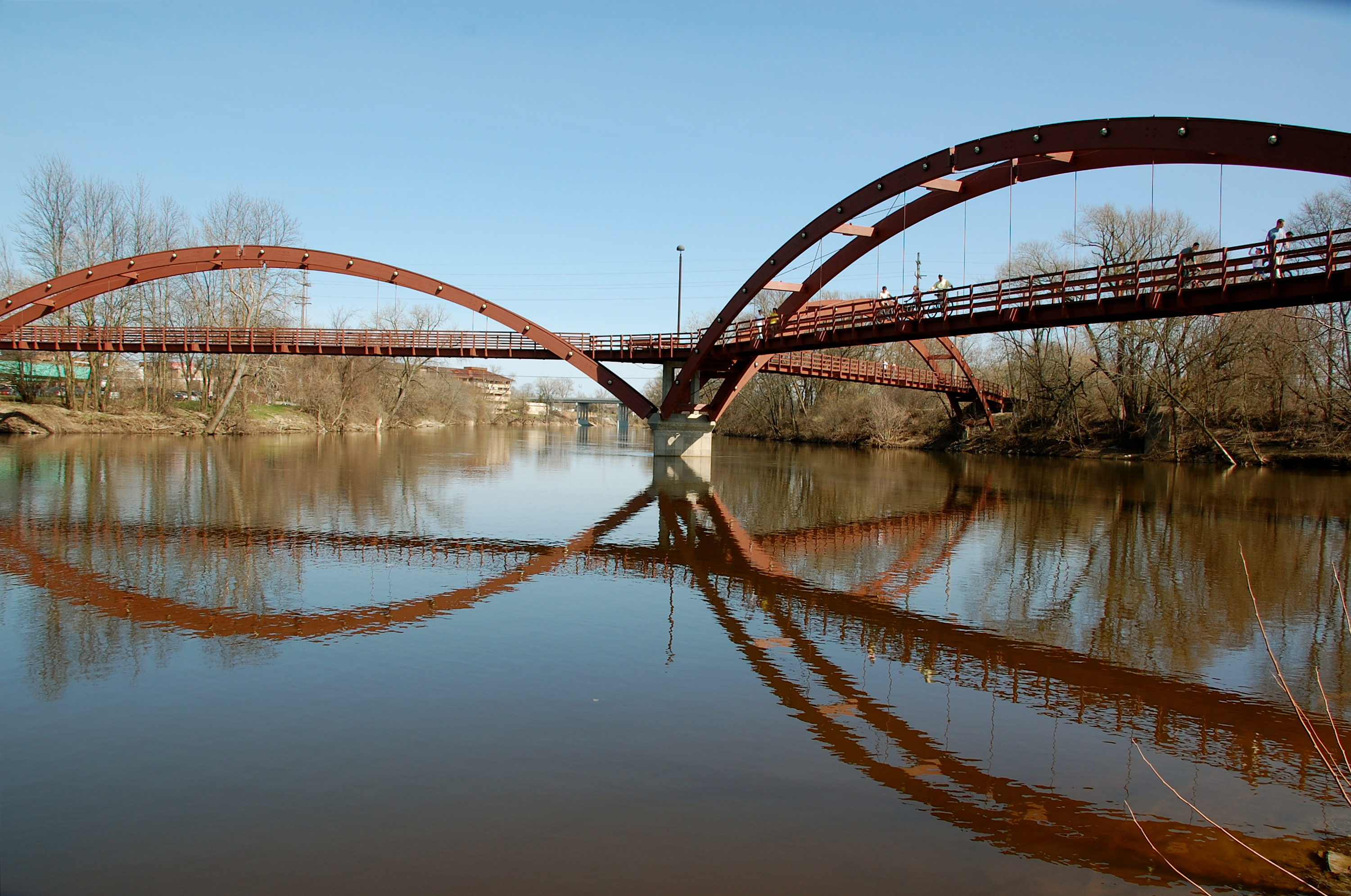
Sine wave reflections

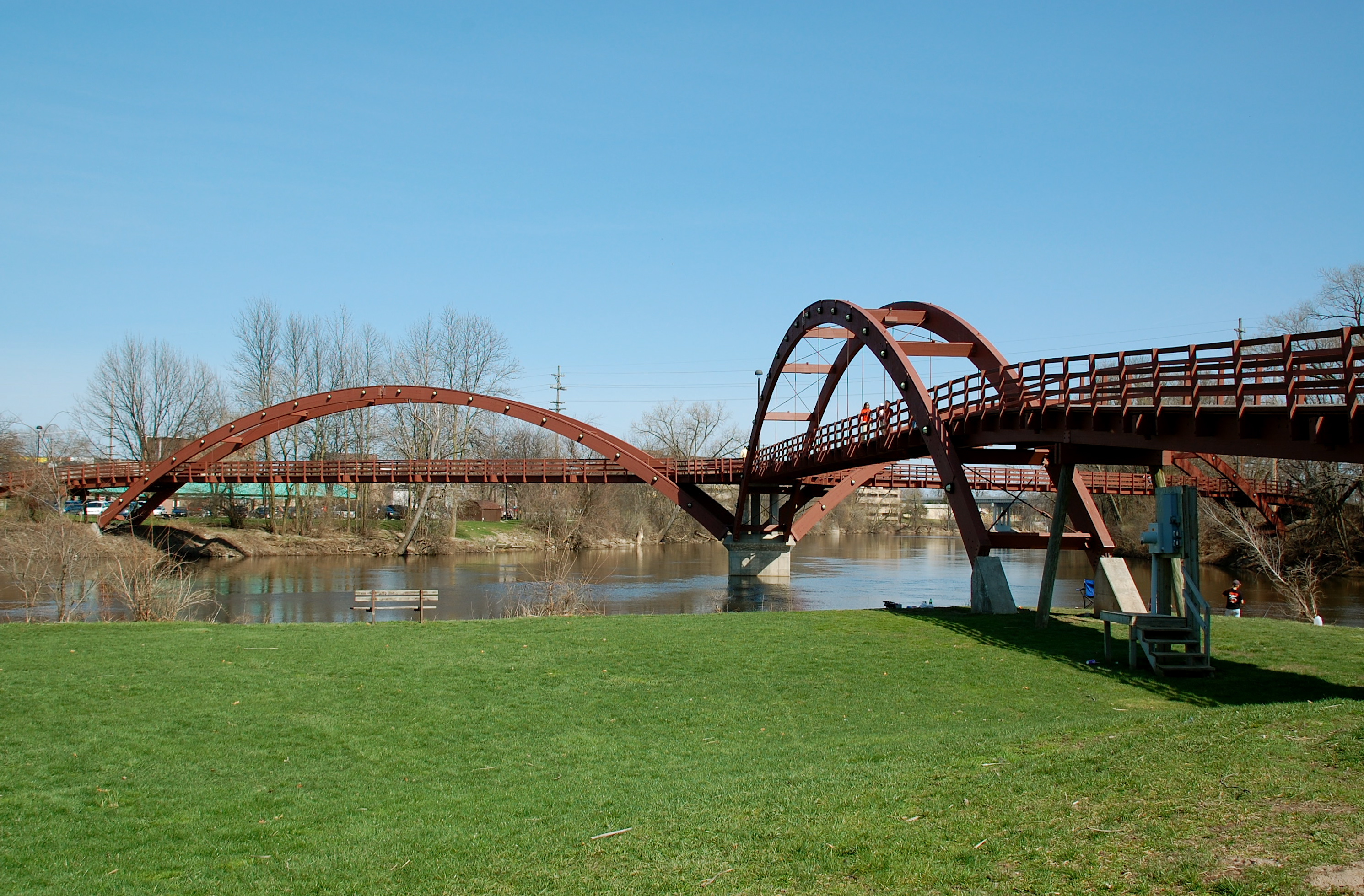
People on Tridge walkway

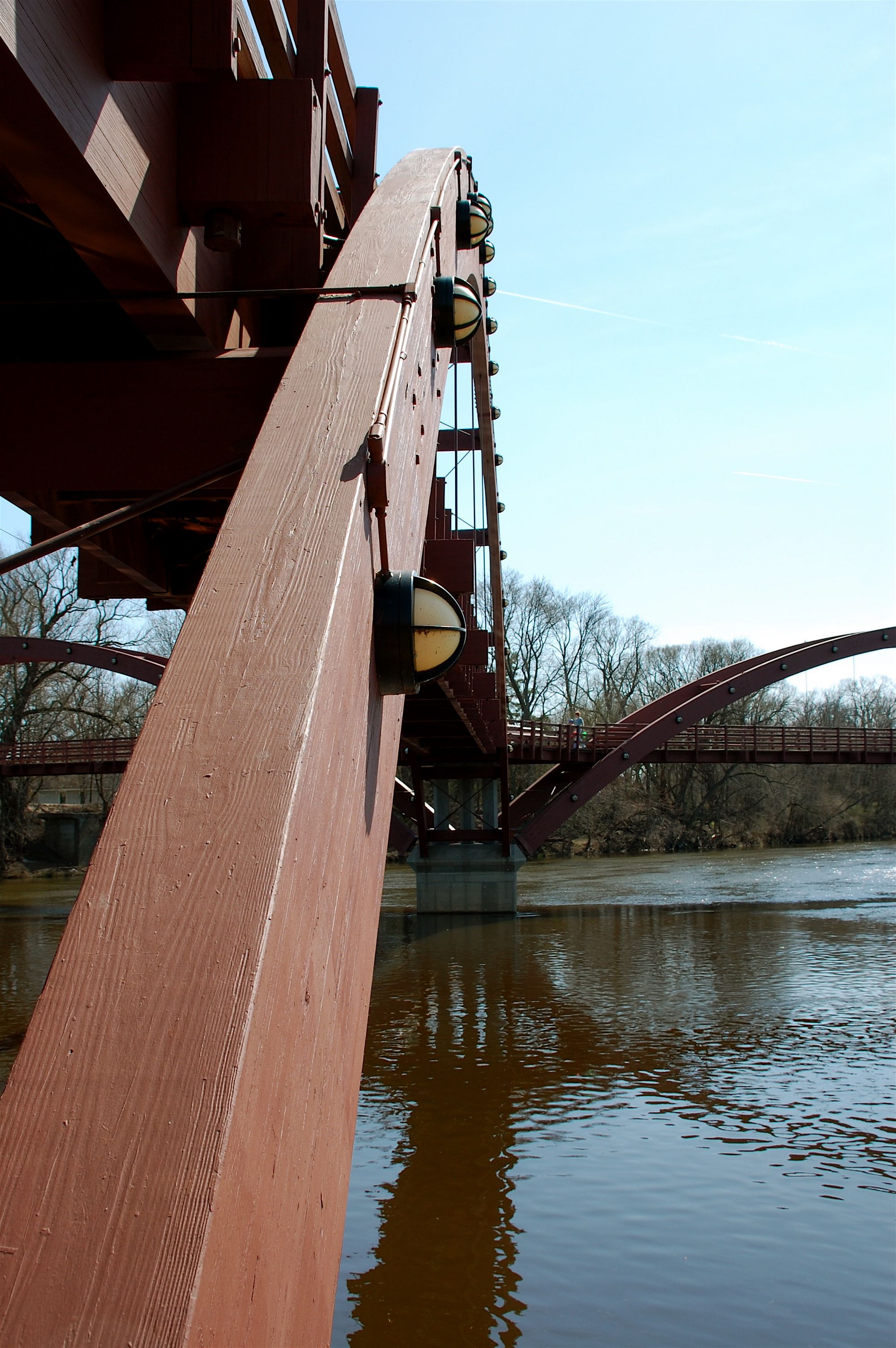
Tridge arch

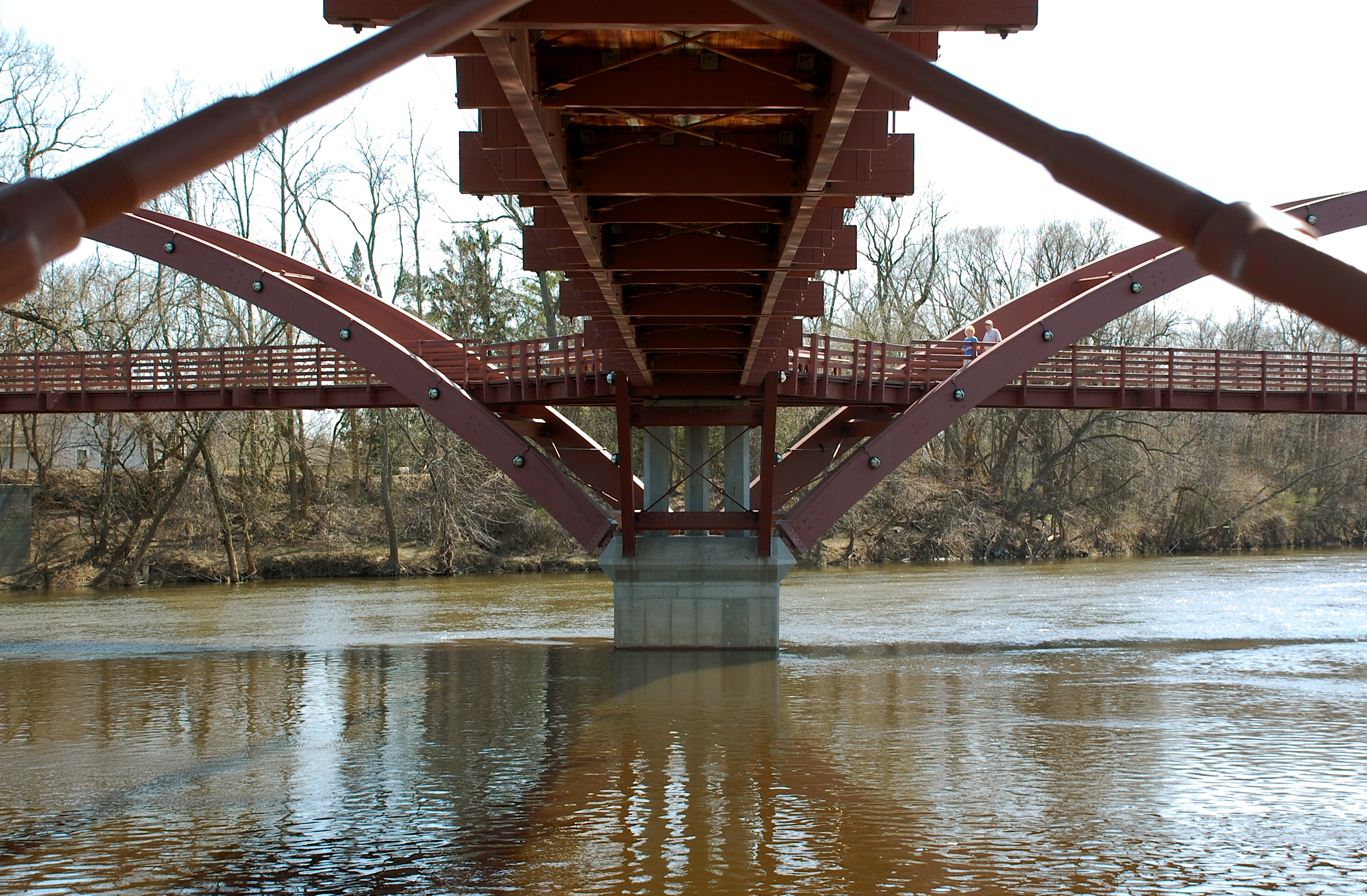
Tridge undercarriage

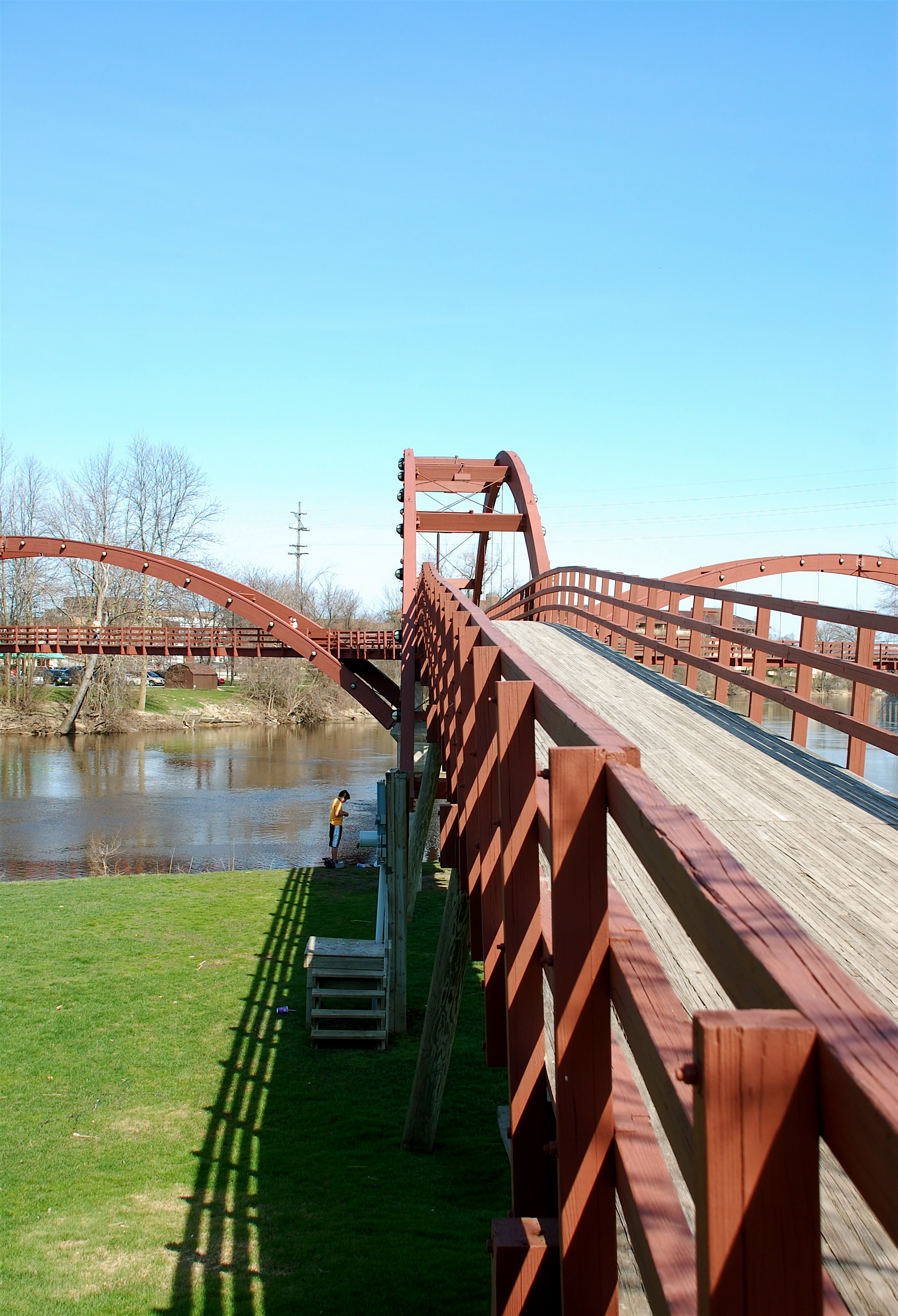
Tridge span

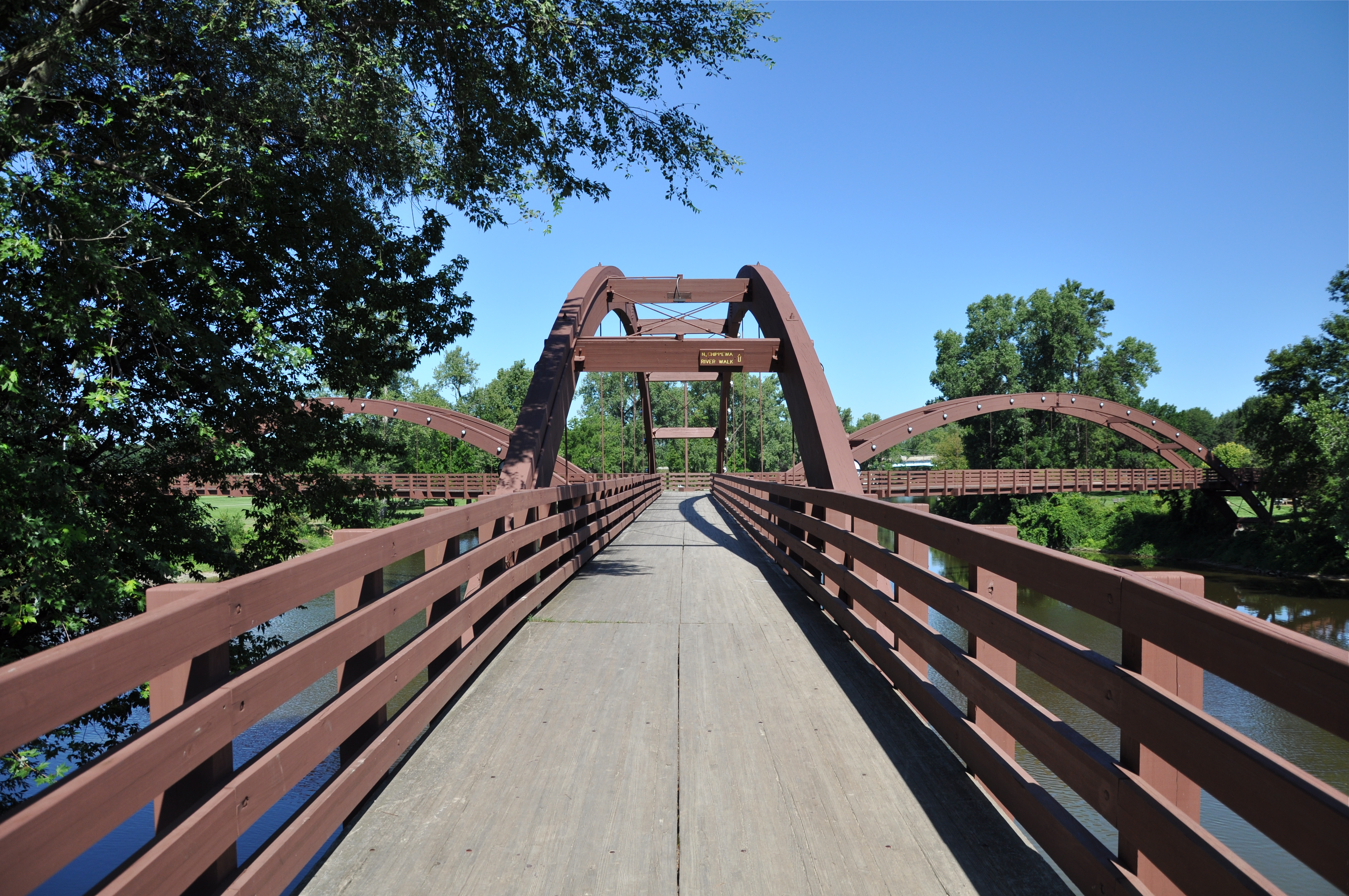
Tridge to somewhere

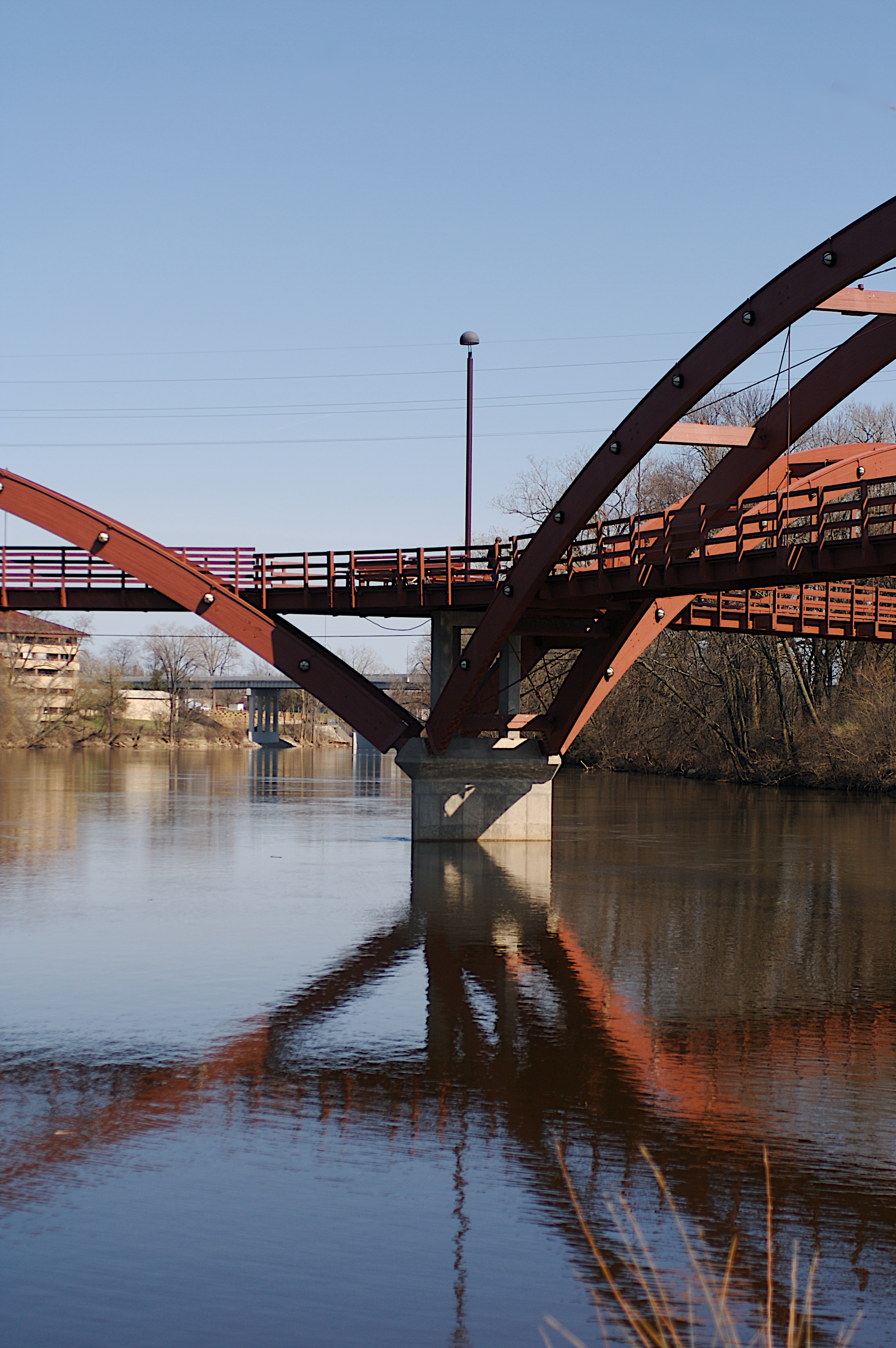
Midland Tridge clean lines

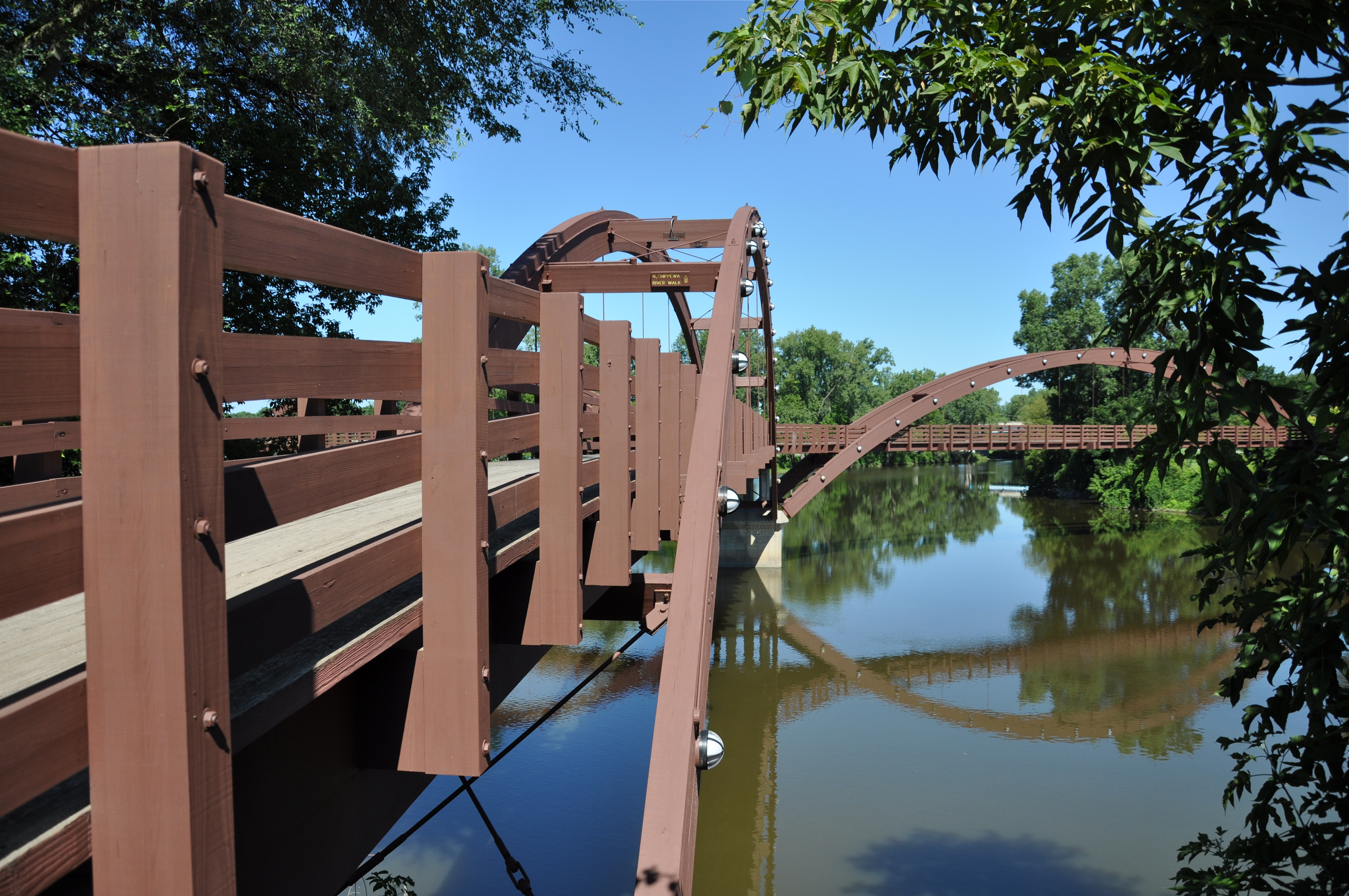
Tridge Arc by sections

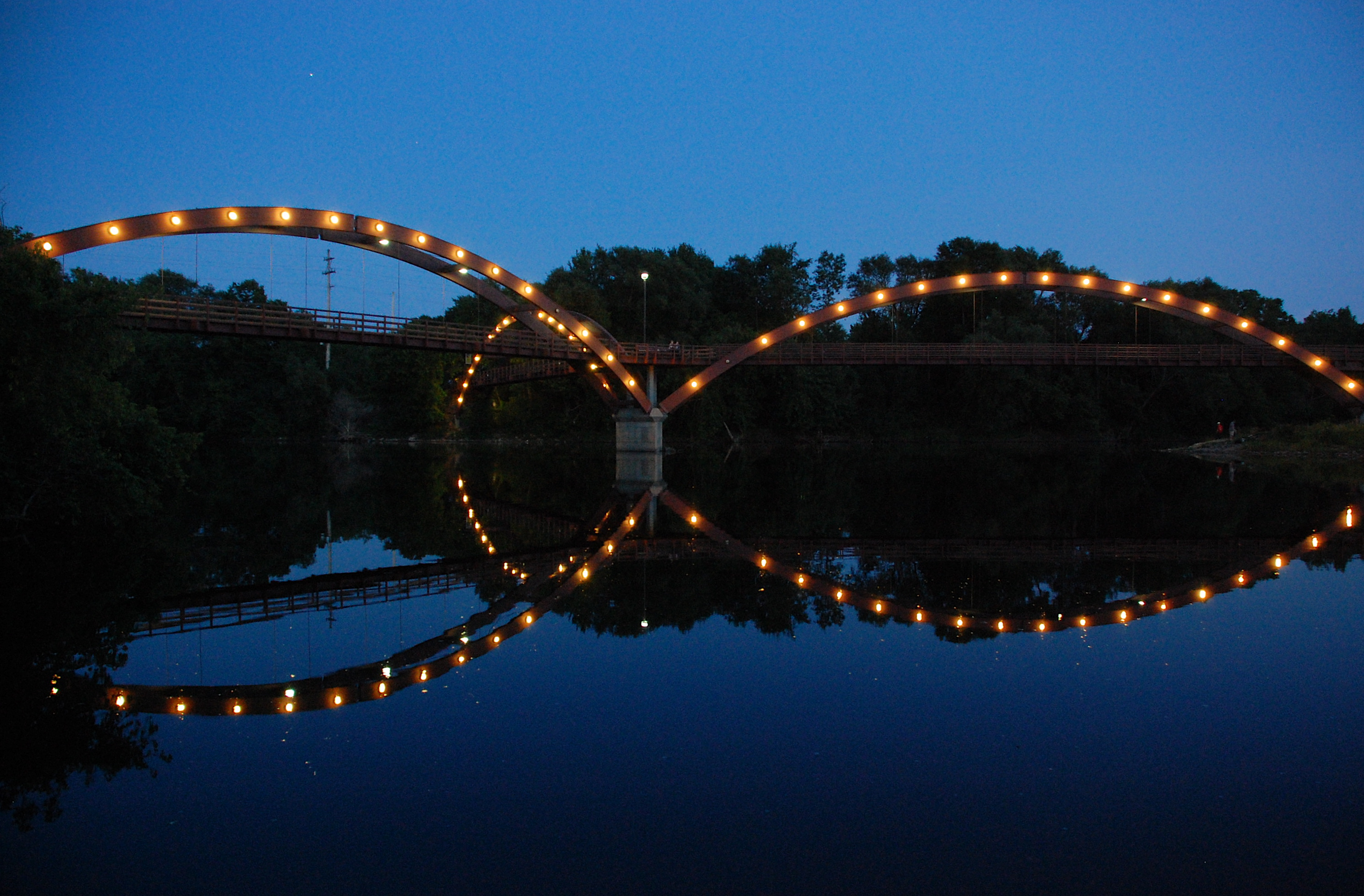
Tridge at dusk
