= Multi-way bridge =

Bridge that spans more than two points

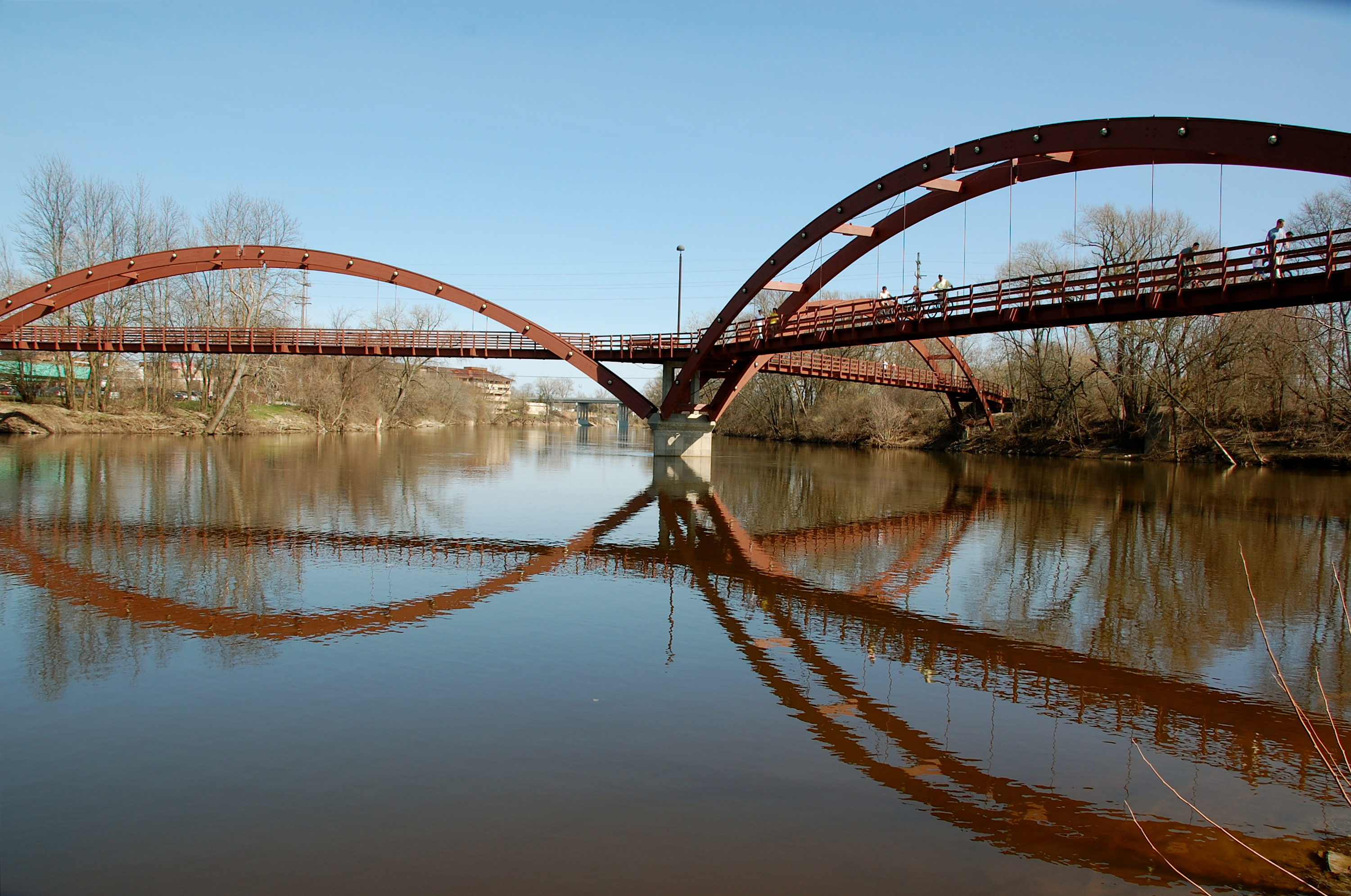
The Tridge in Midland, Michigan

A multi-way bridge is a bridge with three or more distinct and separate spans, where one end of each span meets at a common point near the centre of the bridge. Unlike other bridges which have two entry-exit points, multi-way bridges have three or more entry-exit points. For this reason, multi-way bridges are not to be confused with commonly found road bridges which carry vehicles in one direction from one entry point, and then bifurcate into two other one-way bridges.

== Description ==
Map

Multi-way bridges are located throughout the world, though they are rare. Some are as small as a footbridge, while others are multi-lane roadways.

Three-way bridges are often referred to as "T-bridges" or "Y-bridges", due to their shape when viewed from above. Three cities in Michigan each have a three-way bridge named "Tridge", combining "tri" and "bridge": The Tridge (Midland, Michigan), The Tridge (Ypsilanti, Michigan) and The Tridge in Brighton, Michigan.

The unique shape of a multi-way bridge makes it easy to identify from an airplane. Pilot Amelia Earhart described Zanesville, Ohio as "the most recognizable city in the country" because of its Y-shaped bridge, and the pilots of Enola Gay aimed for Hiroshima's T-shaped Aioi Bridge when they dropped the atom bomb.

While designing the Tripartite Bridge in 1846—a Y-bridge proposed to span the Allegheny River and Monongahela River in Pittsburgh, Pennsylvania—engineer John A. Roebling identified one of the challenges of erecting a three-way suspension-type bridge. Suspension-bridge cables on two-way bridges support heavy loads and are anchored solidly at either end, while on a three-way bridge the cables of each of the three spans need to anchor at a central pier in the water, where cable forces from each span would have to balance each another: "the intersection of the cables at the top of the center pier...would have created enormous horizontal forces, and the stone arches connecting the three towers could hardly have resisted the tensions imposed by the cables radiating from their tops." The bridge was never built.

== Three-way bridges ==
Bridge name	Location	Coordinates	Description	Image
Aioi Bridge	Hiroshima, Japan	34.3964°N 132.4526°E	Vehicle and pedestrian T-bridge. Built in 1932, heavily damaged by atomic bombing in 1945, reconstructed 1983.	
Alsen Bridge	Berlin, Germany	52.5235°N 13.3722°E	T-shaped bridge. Built in 1858; damaged by exposure to shipping, and torn down in 1890.	
Andorra Bridge	Madrid, Spain	40.405114°N 3.722811°W	Y-shaped footbridge over Manzanares River.	
Bergues Bridge (fr:Pont des Bergues)	Geneva, Switzerland	46.20593°N 6.147054°E	Pedestrian Y-bridge over the Rhône.	
BlueCross BlueShield of Tennessee building footbridge	Chattanooga, Tennessee, United States	35.05223°N 85.31798°W	T-shaped footbridge	
Bow River Pathway bridge	Calgary, Canada	51.048807°N 114.109497°W	T-shaped footbridge	
Bridge With 3 Branches (Le pont à 3 branches)	Pont-de-Veyle, France	46.266467°N 4.879134°E	Pedestrian Y-bridge over the Veyle.	
Bridge With Three Entrances (Ponte das Três Entradas)	Oliveira do Hospital Municipality, Portugal	40.306739°N 7.871198°W	Vehicle and pedestrian Y-bridge.	
Calatrava Bridge	Petah Tikva, Israel	32.091803°N 34.86641°E	Y-shaped footbridge designed by Santiago Calatrava.	
Camp Evergreen Girl Scouts Camp bridge	Cowlitz County, Washington, United States	46.211098°N 123.206755°W	Pedestrian Y-bridge over Mill Creek.	
Chincoteague Road	Chincoteague, Virginia, United States	37.937603°N 75.381620°W	Vehicle T-bridge.	
Chu Y Bridge	Ho Chi Minh City, Vietnam	10.750946°N 106.683653°E	Vehicle and pedestrian Y-bridge built in 1937.	
Colin Glen Forest Park Tri-Bridge	Dunmurry, Northern Ireland	54.577218°N 6.034307°W	Y-shaped footbridge.	
Eco-Viikki Three Way Bridge	Helsinki, Finland	60.226107°N 25.034079°E	Pedestrian Y-bridge.	
Fogelsangh State Three Way Bridge	Veenklooster, Netherlands	53.263396°N 6.109713°E	Pedestrian Y-bridge.	
Galena Y-Bridge	Galena, Missouri, United States	36.805393°N 93.460998°W	Y-shaped bridge historically used for vehicle traffic, now a footbridge.	
Jasenovac Tri-Bridge	Between Jasenovac, Sisak-Moslavina County, Slavonia and Uštica, Bosnia and Herzegovina	45.267997°N 16.916949°E	Vehicle and pedestrian Y-bridge originally built in 1973, destroyed in 1991, then re-built in 2005.	
Kang Ding Tri-Bridge	Kang Ding Xian, Garzê Tibetan Autonomous Prefecture, China	30.05592°N 101.965254°E	Pedestrian Y-bridge.	
Kaptai Lake Y-bridge	Kaptai Upazila, Bangladesh	22.655794°N 92.194897°E	Pedestrian Y-bridge over Kaptai Lake.	
Kikko Bridge	Aoyamakogen Country Club, Mie Prefecture, Japan	34.700234°N 136.401003°E	Y-shaped footbridge built in 1991.	
Krestovy Bridge	Saint Petersburg, Russia	59°42′55.61″N 30°23′24.93″E	Built in 1779, the Krestovy Bridge is a pedestrian Y-bridge over Krestovy Canal in Alexander Park.	
Wishbone Bridge	Austin, Texas, United States	30°15′2.13″N 97°42′52.5″W	Pedestrian Y-bridge over Lady Bird Lake opened in 2026; part of the Ann and Roy Butler Trail.	
Lune Millennium Bridge	Lancaster, Lancashire, England	54.052191°N 2.802525°W	Y-shaped footbridge.	
Louisa/Fort Gay Tri-Bridge	Between Fort Gay, West Virginia and Louisa, Kentucky, United States	38.11632°N 82.599821°W	Vehicle and pedestrian T-bridge opened in 1906.	
Lowell T Bridge	Lowell, Ohio, United States	39.526465°N 81.50698°W	Vehicle and pedestrian T-bridge over Muskingum River.	
Malvina Footbridge	Malvina, Mississippi, United States	33.852288°N 90.919145°W	Wooden vehicle and pedestrian T-bridge built in the late 1920s, and demolished in 1972.	
Mangakahia Twin Bridges	Nukutawhiti, New Zealand	35.623797°S 173.846626°E	Vehicle and pedestrian T-bridge over Mangakahia River.	
Margaret Bridge	Budapest, Hungary	47.514722°N 19.043611°E	Vehicle and pedestrian Y-bridge.	
Miyoshi Bridge	Tokyo, Japan	35°40′16.44″N 139°46′19.11″E	Vehicle and pedestrian Y-bridge (1929) over a bend in the Tsukiji canal.	
Mukkam-Kadavu Bridge	Mukkam, India	11.3215°N 76.000282°E	Vehicle and pedestrian Y-bridge over Iruvanhji River, opened in 2016.	
nl:Noabers Badde, also called Mercedesbrug	Veelerveen, Netherlands	53.053361°N 7.127363°E	Pedestrian Y-bridge built in 1989 at the convergence of the Mussel, Diamonds, and During canals.	
Overseas Highway	Pigeon Key, Florida, United States	24.704289°N 81.155974°W	Partially abandoned vehicle and pedestrian T-bridge.	
Pierre Corneille Bridge	Rouen, France	49.435948°N 1.095497°E	Vehicle and pedestrian T-bridge over the Seine.	
Polson Bridge	Polson, Montana, United States		Vehicle and pedestrian Y-bridge over Polson Bay. The divided approach to the bridge was controversial, as merchants wanted a single approach. The historic bridge was the longest driving bridge in Montana.	
Raehills Three-Way Footbridge	Lockerbie, Scotland	55.227105°N 3.465388°W	Y-shaped footbridge built in the late 1800s.	
Sancha Zijin Bridge/Hama Bridge	Xingtai, Hebei, China	37.522016°N 114.485609°E	Vehicle and pedestrian stone Y-bridge built in 1691.	
Sheikh Hasina Titas Bridge	Charlohania, Bangladesh	23°43′36.56″N 90°50′56.67″E	Vehicle and pedestrian Y-bridge opened in 2018 over Titas River and Sadarghat-Ramchandrapur Ferry Path.	
Staniastate footbridge	Staniastate, Oentsjerk, Netherlands	53.257006°N 5.897111°E	Y-shaped footbridge.	
Stockingfield Bridge	Glasgow, Scotland	55°53′33.44″N 4°17′9.63″W	Y-shaped footbridge over Forth and Clyde Canal, connecting Maryhill, Ruchill, and Gilshochill. Completed in 2022.	
Strömsborgsbron	Gamla stan, Sweden	59.327304°N 18.064282°E	Vehicle and pedestrian T-bridge.	
Thetford Footbridge	Thetford, England	52.413277°N 0.746904°E	Y-shaped footbridge.	
Three-Legged Bridge	Milton Keynes, England	52.047022°N 0.734279°W	Y-shaped footbridge	
Three-Way Bridge	Lyons Falls, New York, United States	43.616879°N 75.357202°W	Vehicle and pedestrian wooden T-bridge opened in 1849, replaced with steel in 1916, and demolished in 1965.	
Tinmukhe Bridge	Lumbini Province, Nepal	27°56′05.3″N 83°26′22.8″E	Y-shaped suspension bridge at junction of Gulmi, Palpa and Syangja districts.	
The Tridge (Brighton)	Brighton, Michigan, United States	42.530473°N 83.783022°W	Y-shaped footbridge.	
The Tridge (Midland)	Midland, Michigan, United States	43.611052°N 84.248689°W	Y-shaped footbridge.	
The Tridge (Ypsilanti)	Ypsilanti, Michigan, United States	42.24561°N 83.6116°W	Y-shaped footbridge.	
Trangrav Bridge (Trangravsbroen)	Copenhagen, Denmark	55.677694°N 12.598943°E	Pedestrian and cyclist Y-bridge over Christianshavn Canal and Trangraven. Two of the bridge spans may open for passing sailboats. When both spans open at the same time the bridge resembles a butterfly.	
Trinity Bridge (Crowland)	Crowland, Lincolnshire, England	52.6757°N 0.168281°W	Y-shaped stone footbridge.	
Trinity Bridge (Greater Manchester)	Greater Manchester, England	53.482717°N 2.251098°W	Y-shaped footbridge over River Irwell, designed by Santiago Calatrava.	
Tripartite Bridge	Saint Petersburg, Russia	59°56′29.64″N 30°19′43.89″E	Vehicle and pedestrian T-bridge over Moyka River and Griboyedov Canal.	
Vijversburg Estate Tri-Bridge	Tytsjerk, Netherlands	53.217052°N 5.907743°E	Y-shaped footbridge.	
Vines Mansion Bridge	Loganville, Georgia, United States	33.862035°N 83.923614°W	Y-shaped footbridge.	
Ypsilon Bridge	Drammen, Norway	59.744396°N 10.195313°E	Y-shaped footbridge.	
Zanesville Y-Bridge	Zanesville, Ohio, United States	39.940417°N 82.014306°W	Vehicle and pedestrian Y-bridge.	

== Four-way bridges ==
Bridge name	Location	Coordinates	Description	Image
Bridge over Fondamenta Tre Ponti	Venice, Italy	45°26′13.49″N 12°19′11.74″E	Four-way footbridge over the intersection of three canals.	
Bridge over two canals at Les Attaques, France	Les Attaques, France	50°53′35.63″N 1°58′11.89″E	Four-way vehicle and pedestrian T-bridge over two canals.	
The Three Bridges (De Tre Broer)	Aarhus, Denmark	56.14380°N 10.17347°E	Bikeway bridge in H-shape over Arhus River. The bridge has two spans to each of the river banks. They are connected by a longer fifth span in the middle of the river. The middle span passes under 3 railway bridges which crosses the river.	

== Five-way bridge ==
Bridge name	Location	Coordinates	Description	Image
Ponte dei Trepponti	Comacchio, Italy	44.692984°N 12.18329°E	Five-way stone footbridge at the intersection of five canals, built in 1634.	
