= Mr. and Mrs Frank Boonstra House =

Historic house in Michigan, United States

- U.S. National Register of Historic Places
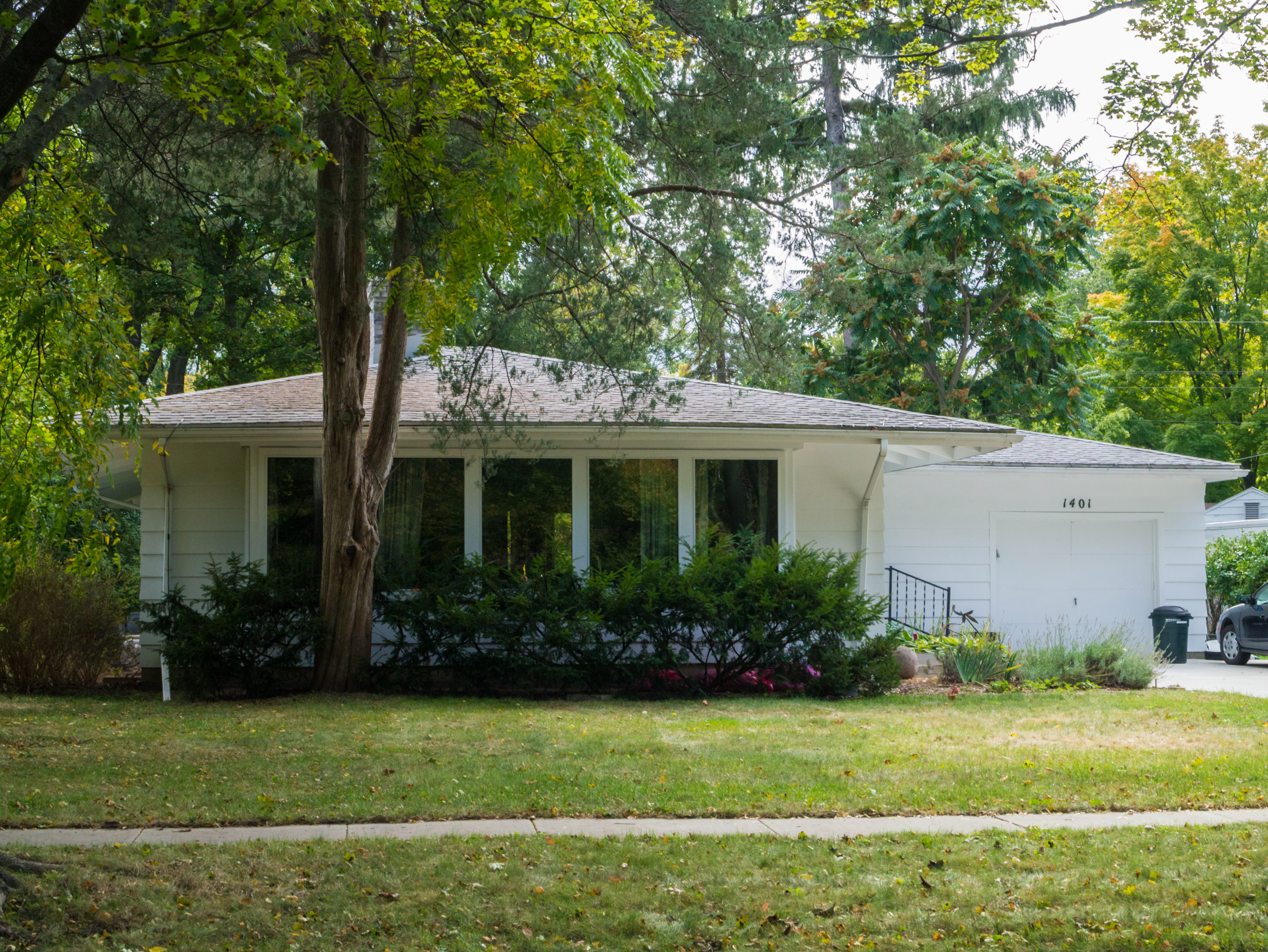

- Location within Michigan Location within the United States
- Interactive map
- Location: 1401 Helen St., Midland, Michigan
- Coordinates: 43°37′26″N 84°14′27″W
- Area: less than one acre
- Built: 1941
- Built by: Dow, Alden, Building Co.
- Architect: Dow, Alden B.
- Architectural style: Modern Movement
- MPS: Residential Architecture of Alden B. Dow in Midland, Michigan MPS
- NRHP reference No.: 04000644
- Added to NRHP: June 22, 2004

The Mr. and Mrs Frank Boonstra House (also known as the Bonstra House) is a historic house located at 1401 Helen Street in Midland, Michigan, USA. It was listed on the National Register of Historic Places on June 22, 2004.

== History ==
The Boonstra House was designed by architect Alden B. Dow in 1941, and built by the associated Alden Dow Building Co. The wood siding and broad eaves are not typical of Dow's earlier work, but do presage some of his later designs. An addition was constructed to the house in 1976.

== Description ==
The Boonstra House is a one-story, Modern Movement style house with wood siding, hip roof and broad overhanging eaves. A one-car garage is attached to the rear of the house, and a broad bay window is located in the front. On the interior, the main door leads to an open living area, with living room and dining area. A fireplace separates the area from the compact kitchen. The rear of the house originally contained two bedrooms and a bath; the addition supplied a second bath and a third bedroom.

It has been described as "a good example of Dow’s interest in well-designed low cost housing".
