= Lake, Clare County, Michigan =

Lake, Michigan
- Unincorporated community
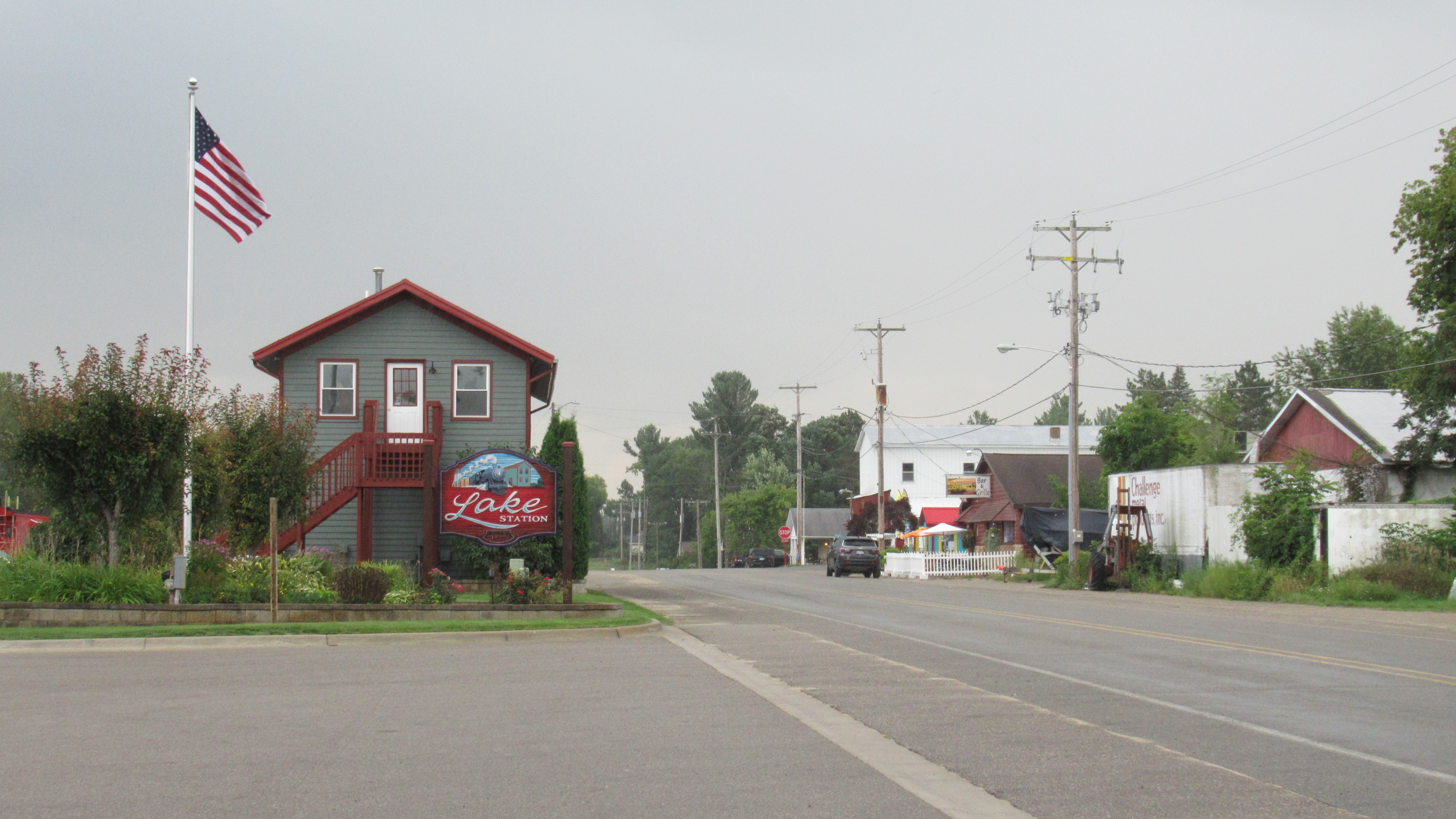
- Looking southeast along Mystic Lake Road

- Location within the state of Michigan Location within the United States
- Coordinates: 43°51′07″N 85°00′19″W
- Country: United States
- State: Michigan
- County: Clare
- Township: Garfield
- Settled: 1873
- Established: 1877
- Elevation: 1,063 ft (324 m)
- Time zone: UTC-5 (Eastern (EST))
  - Summer (DST): UTC-4 (EDT)
- ZIP code(s): 48632
- Area code: 989
- GNIS feature ID: 629957

Lake is an unincorporated community in Clare County in the United State of Michigan. The community is located within Garfield Township. As an unincorporated community, Lake has no legal autonomy of its own but does have its own post office with the 48632 ZIP Code.

== Geography ==
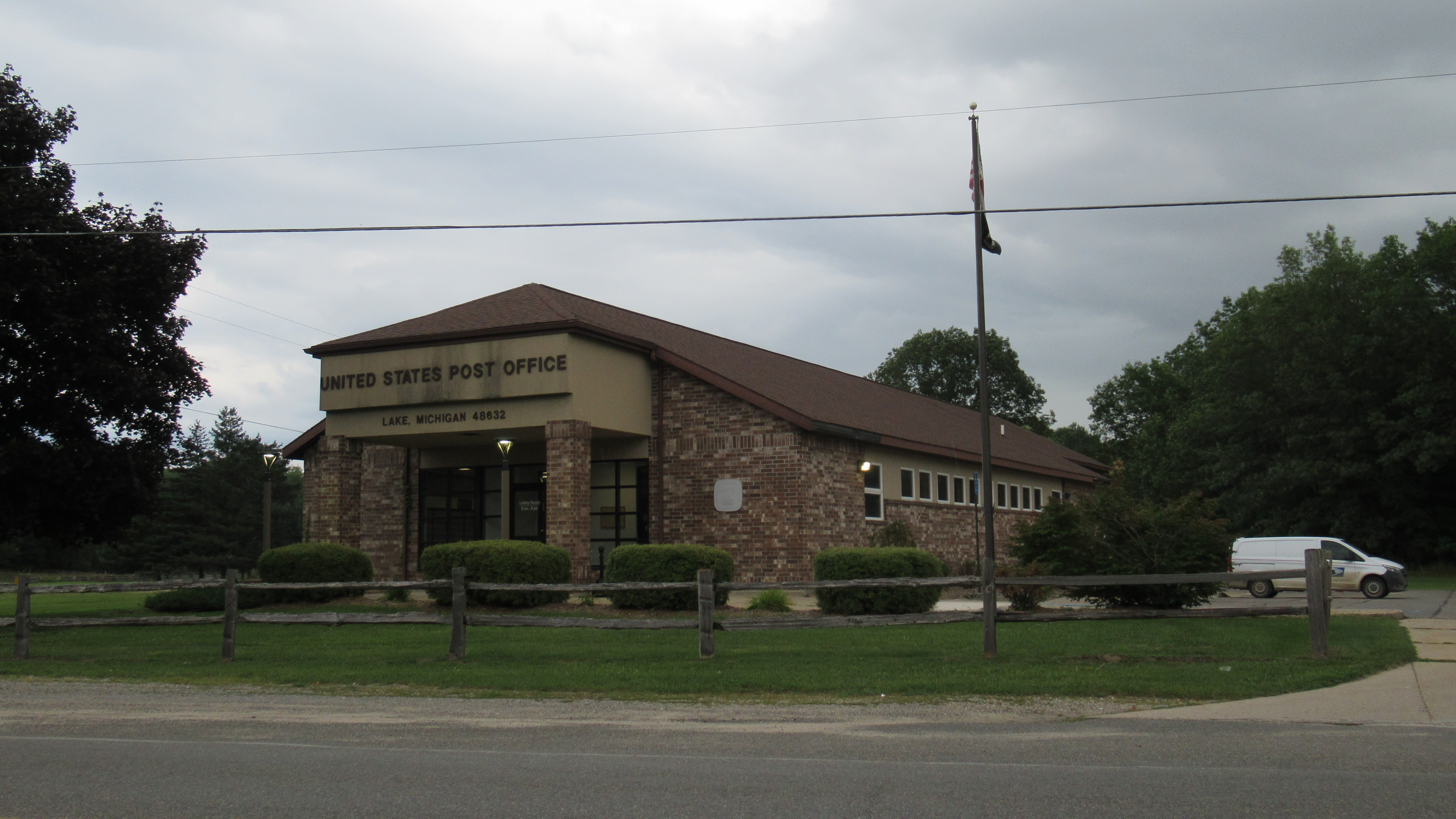
U.S. Post Office in Lake

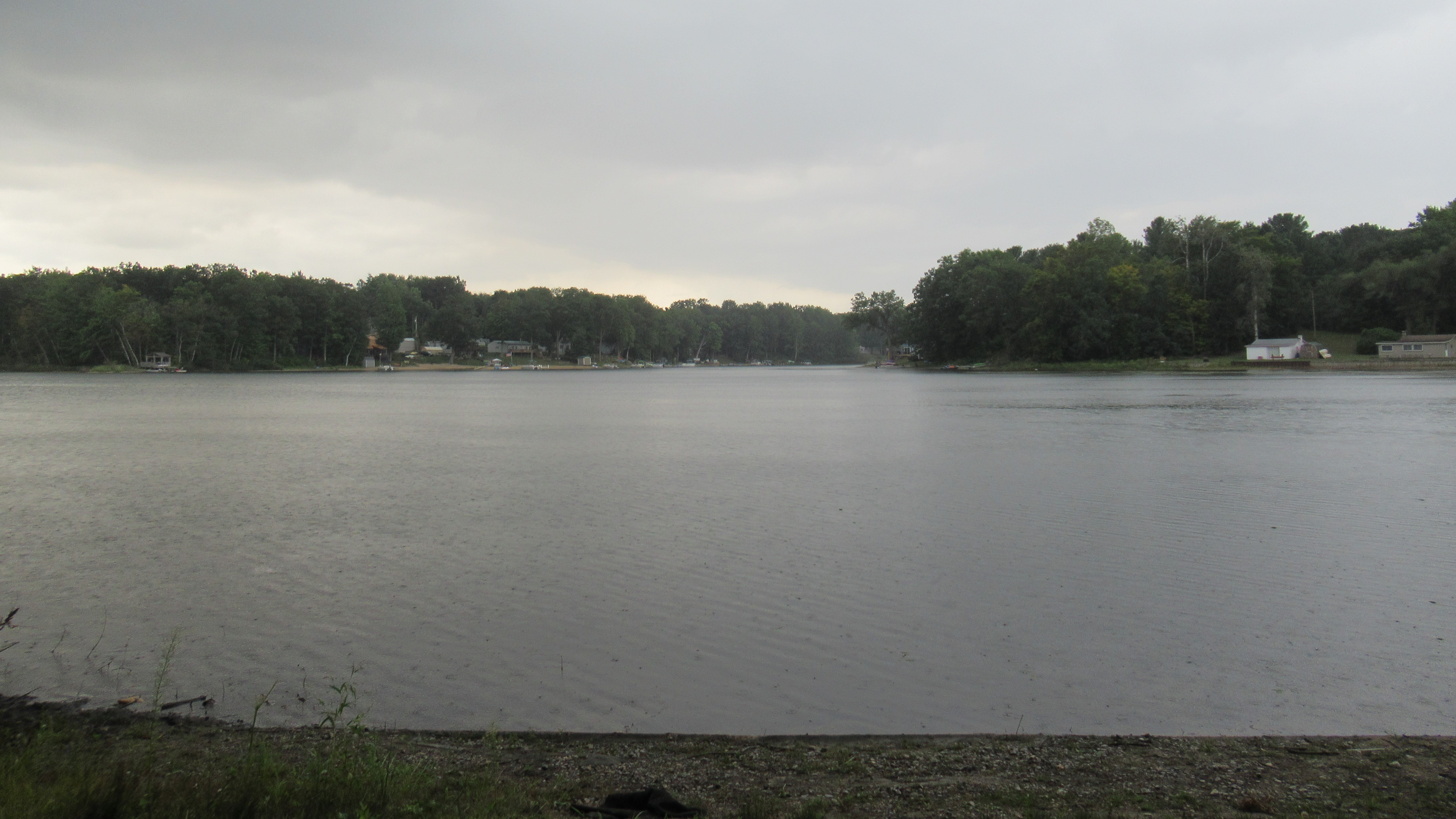
Perch Lake from the boating access site

Lake is located in Garfield Township in southweastern Clare County about 5.0 miles (8.0 km) west of the village of Farwell along U.S. Highway 10. The community is situated between two lakes: the larger Crooked Lake on the west and the smaller Perch Lake on the east. The community is located near many other smaller lakes, including Big Cranberry Lake, Gray Lake, and Mystic Lake. Eight Point Lake is a larger lake located to the west.

Other nearby communities include Lake George to the north, Weidman to the south, the village of Barryton to the southwest, and Sears to the northwest. The city of Clare and U.S. Highway 127 are about 12.0 miles (19.3 km) to the east via M-115.

The Lake post office uses the 48632 ZIP Code. The current post office is located at 8959 Lake Station Avenue. The post office serves a large Tabulation Area covering 126.84 square miles (328.51 km^{2}) of land and a population of 5,125. The post office serves the majority of Garfield Township, as well as most of Freeman Township to the north. The post office also serves the western portion of Lincoln Township, as well as a very small portion of Surrey Township and Redding Township. The ZIP Code also extends west into small areas of Orient Township in Osceola County and Fork Township in Mecosta County. In Isabella County to the south, the Lake post office serves portions of Coldwater, Gilmore, and Sherman townships.

The Pere Marquette State Trail is a 55-mile-long (89 km) multi-use trail that runs from Clare to Baldwin along the former railway lines. The community of Lake contains a trailhead called Lake Station Depot. The Garfield Township Hall is located in Lake at 9348 Terry Street in the center of the community. The community is served entirely by Farwell Area Schools to the east in the village of Farwell.

== History ==
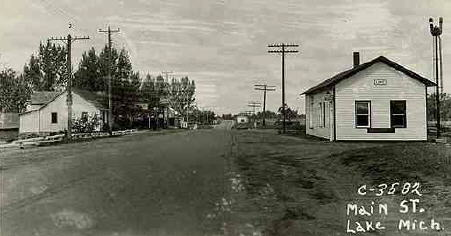
Historic image of Lake in 1910

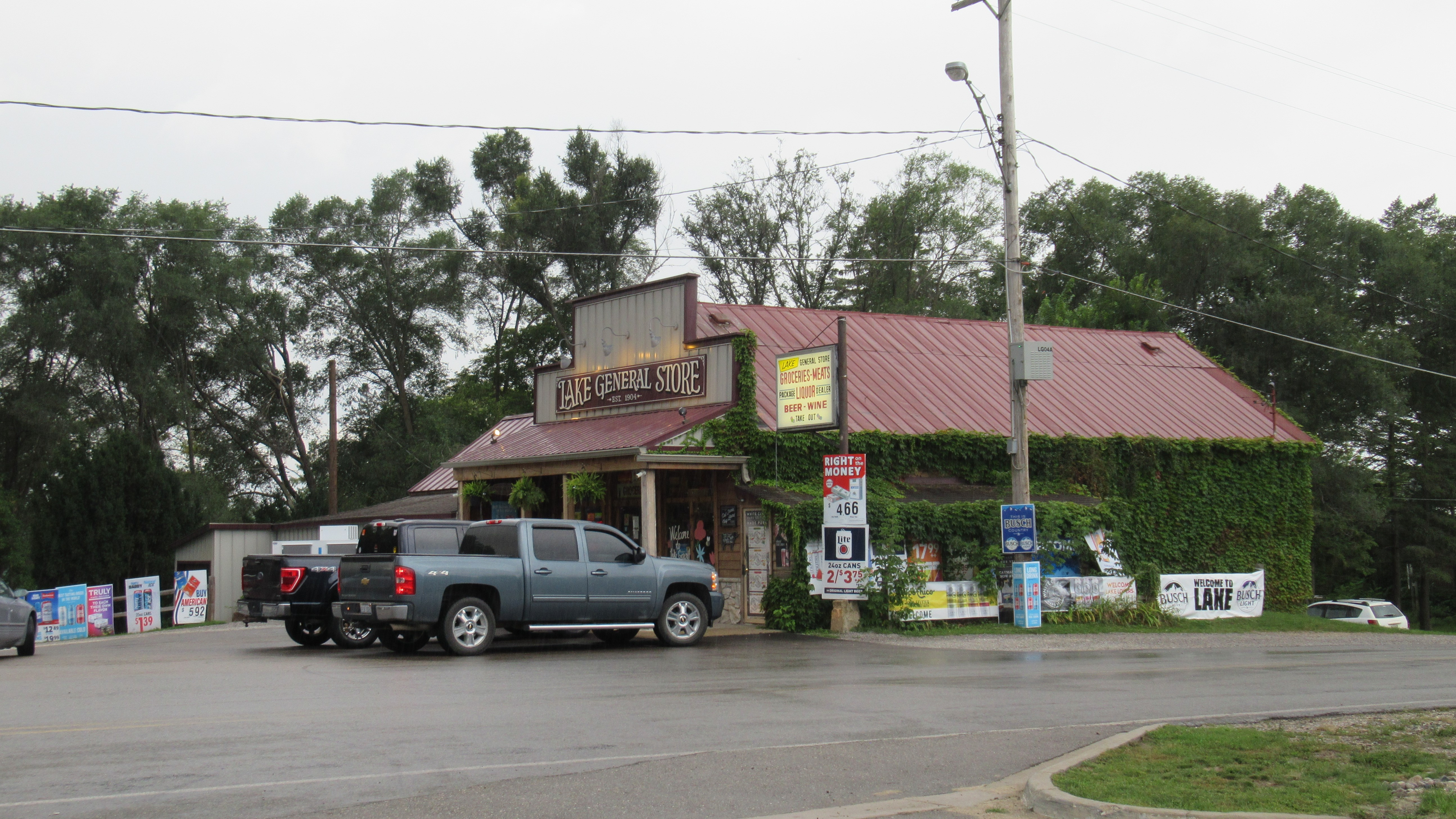
Lake General Store, established 1904

The Lake Station train depot predates the community itself, which was settled as a lumber camp as early as 1873 by Scott Garrish. The Flint and Pere Marquette Railroad began expanding into the area in the early 1870s, and Lake Station can be seen on a historic 1873 map of Clare County, which itself was organized in 1871. Lake Station was originally part of Surrey Township until Garfield Township was created in 1897.

By 1877, a community named Lake Station formed around the train depot. A post office named Crooked Lake opened on February 28, 1877, with railroad agent Charles Howard Bates serving as the first postmaster. The name came from the nearby Crooked Lake. The original train depot was struck by lightning and burned down in 1892 during a severe storm that devastated the surrounding area. A new depot was soon built in its place. In 1897, Garfield Township was set aside from the southwestern portion of Surrey Township, and Crooked Lake would become part of the new township. The name of the post office was shortened to Lake on March 11, 1909. Among the oldest remaining structures in the community include the Lake General Store, which has been in operation since 1904.

The Flint and Pere Marquette Railroad soon became the Pere Marquette Railway in 1900, and the railway lines served as an important route between Saginaw and Ludington, as well as connecting many communities in the Lower Peninsula. U.S. Route 10 was also rerouted to pass directly through the community just north of the railway lines by 1938. The railway depot was expanded, and the railway lines eventually came under the ownership of the Chesapeake and Ohio Railway before closing in 1949. The railway lines were removed, while the unused train depot was restored and serves as a museum. The only other trace of the former railway is the coaling tower, which still stands as one of the few remaining structures of its kind in the state. This segment of the former railway lines was converted into the Pere Marquette State Trail.

Because the community was once referred to as Lake Station, it may still be referred as such to distinguish it from its generic name of Lake. While the post office itself remains in operation and is known as Lake, it can also receive mail under the Lake Station destination.
