= Pere Marquette Trail =

The name Pere Marquette Trail may refer to either of two separate rail trails in the Lower Peninsula of Michigan:

- Pere Marquette State Trail between Baldwin and Evart
- Pere Marquette Rail-Trail between Clare and Midland
