= Rock Road massacre =

1982 murder Michigan, United States

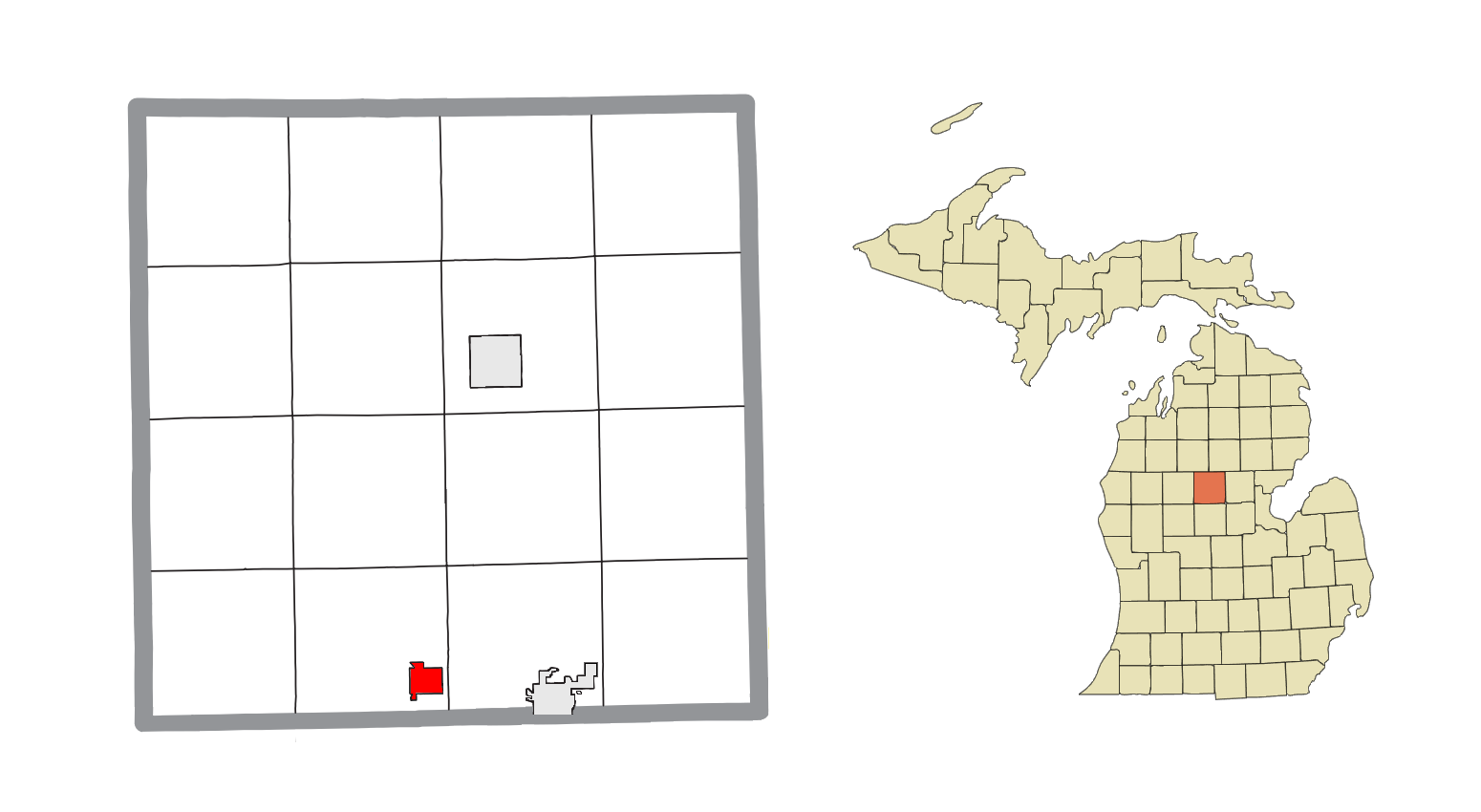
- Location of Farewell in Michigan
- Location: 43°50′3.4″N 84°57′42.6″W; 5603 West Rock Road, 7 miles west of Farwell, Michigan, US
- Date: 16 February 1982; 44 years ago
- Attack type: Mass murder, mass shooting
- Weapons: 20-gauge shotgun; .38-caliber nickel-plated Smith & Wesson revolver
- Victims: 7
- Perpetrator: Robert Lee Haggart

The Rock Road massacre, also known as the Farwell murders or Clare County murders, was a 1982 mass murder in which seven members of the George W. Post family, four adults and three children, were killed with a shotgun and a handgun at a farmhouse on Rock Road in Garfield Township just west of Farwell, Michigan, United States.

Robert Lee Haggart, a 32-year-old livestock auctioneer, was convicted of the murders. The murders occurred on the day before a court hearing to finalize Haggart's divorce from one of the victims, Garnetta (Ronning) Haggart.

In December 1982, the Associated Press (AP) included the Post family murders at No. 3 on its list of the most important news stories in Michigan during 1982. As of 2026, the massacre still ranked as one of the largest mass murders in Michigan history, after the 1927 Bath School disaster, the 1971 Hazelwood massacre and the 2011 Grand Rapids shooting.

== Prior to the murders ==
=== Robert Lee Haggart ===
Mugshot of Robert Haggart

Robert Lee Haggart was born in 1950, grew up in Rosebush, Michigan, and attended Mount Pleasant High School. In 1968, Haggart enlisted in the Army, qualified as a sharpshooter, and served in Germany and Vietnam. After his discharge from the Army, Haggart returned to Rosebush where he worked on farms, sold livestock feed, and worked as a livestock auctioneer. He developed a reputation as a heavy drinker and "a man with an eye for the ladies."

In June 1974, after drinking at a wedding reception at the Rosebush American Legion Hall, Haggart had physical relations with a 14-year-old girl who had also been drinking at the reception. He was initially charged with rape, but accepted a plea to a reduced charge of "taking indecent liberties." He was sentenced to three years of probation. A short time later, another woman accused Haggart of attacking her. He was sentenced to two years and 10 months in prison for probation violations. Haggart spent two years in prison. He was released on parole in June 1977 and returned to Rosebush.

=== Garnetta Ronning ===
Garnetta Ronning was born in 1958 in Midland, Michigan. She was the daughter of Vaudrey Post. When Vaudrey married George W. Post, Garnetta became George's stepchild. George also had children from a prior marriage, and they all lived together on the family farm on Rock Road outside Farwell.

At age 15, Garnetta was caught by her stepfather having intimate relations with a boy. Hoping to avoid punishment, Garnetta claimed that George had raped her. The story was proven to be false. On turning 16, Garnetta became a waitress, working with her aunt at the K&A Chow House in Loomis, Michigan.

=== Murder of Doris Arndt ===
In October 1977, the body of Doris Arndt was discovered near I-75. She had been raped and strangled. She was last seen alive with Haggart at a bar in Midland. Haggart was questioned but never charged. Decades later, DNA evidence tied Haggart to Arndt's murder.

=== Relationship between Haggart and Garnetta ===
In the late summer of 1977, Haggart met Garnetta while eating at the K&A Chow House. He became a regular, and the two began dating. Garnetta became pregnant and had an abortion. Haggart was angry about the abortion, and they stopped seeing each other for a time. However, in late 1980, Haggart moved in with Garnetta in her mobile home in Loomis. They were married in February 1981.

The relationship was troubled, with arguments over Haggart spending hours at bars and financial troubles, including bounced checks. Garnetta showed up at the Chow House one day with bruises on her face from a beating by Haggart. In June 1981, Haggart wrote a check for $17,801 for the purchase of 35 head of cattle, but the check bounced, and police opened an investigation.

In July 1981, Garnetta left Haggart, moved in with her mother and filed for divorce. In August 1981, a warrant was issued for Haggart's arrest for writing a bad check. Haggart fled the area. He had been working as a hog auctioneer, but stopped showing up for work, and his employer noted, "He just disappeared all of a sudden." Haggart moved to Haletown, Tennessee, where he began dating Linda Thomas, a 23-year old pizzeria cook. Garnetta also left Michigan, moving to Florida where she worked in a restaurant.

== Massacre ==
A hearing to finalize the divorce was set for February 17, 1982. Garnetta returned to Michigan for the hearing. Haggart also returned to Michigan, leaving Haletown by bus early on Monday, February 15.

On February 16, 1982, the Post family held a reunion with Garnetta. They gathered at the family's farmhouse on a 57-acre pig farm at 5603 West Rock Road seven miles west of Farwell in Clare County, Michigan. Farwell was at the time a village with approximately 700 residents located 80 miles north of Lansing.

Haggart came to the farmhouse after taking buses from Tennessee. According to the timeline presented by prosecutors, his first victim was Garnetta's stepfather, George W. Post, age 53. Post was a lanky man, the village's mail carrier, a father of seven, treasurer of the Farwell school board, and commander of the local VFP post. He was also active in civic projects and donated pigs for VFW pig roasts that helped to pay for the VFW's new hall. Haggart shot Post with Post's shotgun. Post's body was found at the base of the staircase in the basement of the farmhouse.

According to the prosecution timeline, Haggart next turned his attention to Garnetta's step sister, Helen Gaffney, age 29. Helen attended the reunion with her four children. After the shooting of her father, prosecutors argued that Helen attempted to flee with her children in a pickup truck. Haggart opened fire on the truck using both the shotgun and a handgun. Helen's body was discovered slumped over the bodies of three of her children, Angela, age 10; Tom, age 8; and Amy, age 7.

A fourth child, Amanda Gaffney (referred to as Mandy in many press accounts), 15 months old, was found alive in the truck. Dan Duma, the deputy who discovered Amanda, testified she was on the floorboard of the bullet-riddled truck and was clutching the body of her 10-year-old sister and was "covered with blood." Amanda sustained only a bump on the head, as her mother pushed her to the truck floor out of harm's way. Local media coverage portrayed Helen as a hero, dying while trying to shield her children.

The prosecution argued that Haggart then lay in wait for the arrival of Garnetta, age 23. He used fresh snow to cover the blood on the ground beneath the truck. Garnetta arrived with her mother, Vaudrey, age 42. Vaudrey was a part-time cafeteria worker at the high school who also served on the township election board. Haggart shot Garnetta and Vaudrey as they entered the kitchen.

The murders occurred between 5:00 and 6:30 p.m. Another of Post's daughters, Alice Russell, arrived at approximately 6:30 with her husband Mark and their two children. The house was dark except for a light in the bathroom. The family's three collie dogs were out front guarding the house. The Russells walked into the kitchen, turned on the light, and discovered the bodies of Vaudrey and Garnetta on a bloody floor. The Russells ran to the house of a neighbor, Norman Pelch. Pelch went to the Post farm, saw the scene, and called the sheriff's department.

State police, crime laboratory specialists and a state police helicopter were dispatched to the scene.

The Lansing State Journal reported: "Before the grisly event was a day old, people had a name for it: the Rock Road Massacre." It was the worst mass murder in Michigan since June 1971 when eight people were murdered in Detroit's Hazelwood massacre. It was the first homicide in Clare County since 1979.

== Arrest and extradition ==
Haggart fled the murder scene in Vaudrey Post's car, a 1980 white and blue four-door Buick LeSabre. Driving Vaudrey's car, Haggart returned to Tennessee, arriving in Haletown on Wednesday night, February 17.

On Thursday, February 18, Haggart went to a restaurant owned by his roommate, Glen C. Davis. Davis had read about the murders and recognized the LeSabre Haggart was driving and called the police. Police set up a roadblock, and as Haggart approached the roadblock, he tried to turn around, but officers blocked his way with their cars. An officer approached and pointed a shotgun in Haggart's ear. Haggart had a loaded .38-caliber revolver by his feet but did not resist. He was held at the Marion County Jail pending extradition to Michigan.

At the time of his arrest, Haggart was accompanied in the car by his girlfriend, Linda Thomas. She was arrested and later released.

The Marion County Sheriff's Department searched Haggart's apartment in Haletown. They discovered blood-stained blue jeans and boots belonging to Haggart. The blood was later linked to two of the victims.

Haggart waived extradition on February 19. He was flown back to Michigan on Saturday, February 20, accompanied by Clare County Sheriff Ghazey (Gus) Aleck. Haggart was then taken to the Clare County Jail in Harrison, Michigan. He arrived on the same day that 200 people gathered at the Coker Funeral Home to view the closed caskets of the deceased.

== Trial and conviction ==
Haggart was tried for the murders in September 1982. Because of pretrial publicity, the case was moved from Clare County to Midland County. Haggart was represented by James Wilson, and Thomas McLaughlin was the prosecutor. Circuit Judge Tyrone Gillespie presided over the trial. After more than 70 prospective jurors were questioned, a jury of eight women and six men (including two alternates) was sworn on September 13. (Two of the women were alternates, leaving a final jury of six women and six men.)

The prosecution presented its opening argument on September 14, outlining its "pyramid" of evidence. Among other things, the prosecution presented testimony from neighbors who had seen Haggart in front of the farm and from others who confirmed Haggart's bus travel to Detroit and then Farwell. Dr. Laurence Simmons, the doctor who examined the victims, testified that the victims had been shot with a shotgun, a rifle, and a handgun. A fingerprint expert testified that Haggart's prints were not found at the crime scene. Two ballistics experts testified that one of two spent .38 caliber bullets found at the scene matched the gun found in the car Haggart was driving when he was arrested. A blood analyst testified that blood found on clothing seized from Haggart's apartment in Tennessee had unusual characteristics consistent with one of the victims. On October 1, after presenting 200 exhibits and testimony from 67 witnesses, the prosecution rested its case.

On October 4, Haggart's attorney rested without presenting any evidence or witnesses and without putting Haggart on the stand. Haggart's attorney argued that the prosecution had failed to meet its burden of proof. He suggested in closing that Haggart arrived at the Post farm, found the bodies, and then fled in Vaudrey's car.

The jury deliberated for seven-and-a-half hours over three days. On October 8, the jury returned its verdict finding Haggart guilty of first-degree murder in six of the deaths. Because of doubts as to his intent, he was found guilty of second-degree murder in the death of seven-year-old Tom Gaffney. He was also found guilty of attempted murder of Amanda Gaffney.

On October 22, Judge Gillespie sentenced Haggart to seven life sentences plus 32 years. Gillespie said to Haggart: "You have again proven to us that civilization is a veneer and that there still hides in the breast of very few men the bestiality of Attila the Hun."

== Aftermath ==
In December 1982, the Associated Press (AP) included the Post family murders at No. 3 on its list of the most important news stories in Michigan during 1982.

Amid talk of a book or movie deal, survivors of the Post family filed a civil suit against Haggart and, in December 1986, received a $36 million judgment.

Garnetta's brother, Marvin Post, attempted for several years to go to prison so that he could kill Haggart with a shiv, a shank, a steel rod, or anything else he could put his hands on.

On November 21, 2003, Haggart died in prison of natural causes at age 53.

In 2009, DNA evidence tied Haggart to the 1977 rape and murder of a Midland woman, Doris A. Arndt.

As of 2022, the massacre still ranked as the third-largest mass murder in Michigan history, after the 1927 Bath School disaster and the 1971 Hazelwood massacre.

== See also ==
- List of homicides in Michigan
