= Lincoln Township, Clare County, Michigan =

Lincoln Township, Michigan
- Civil township
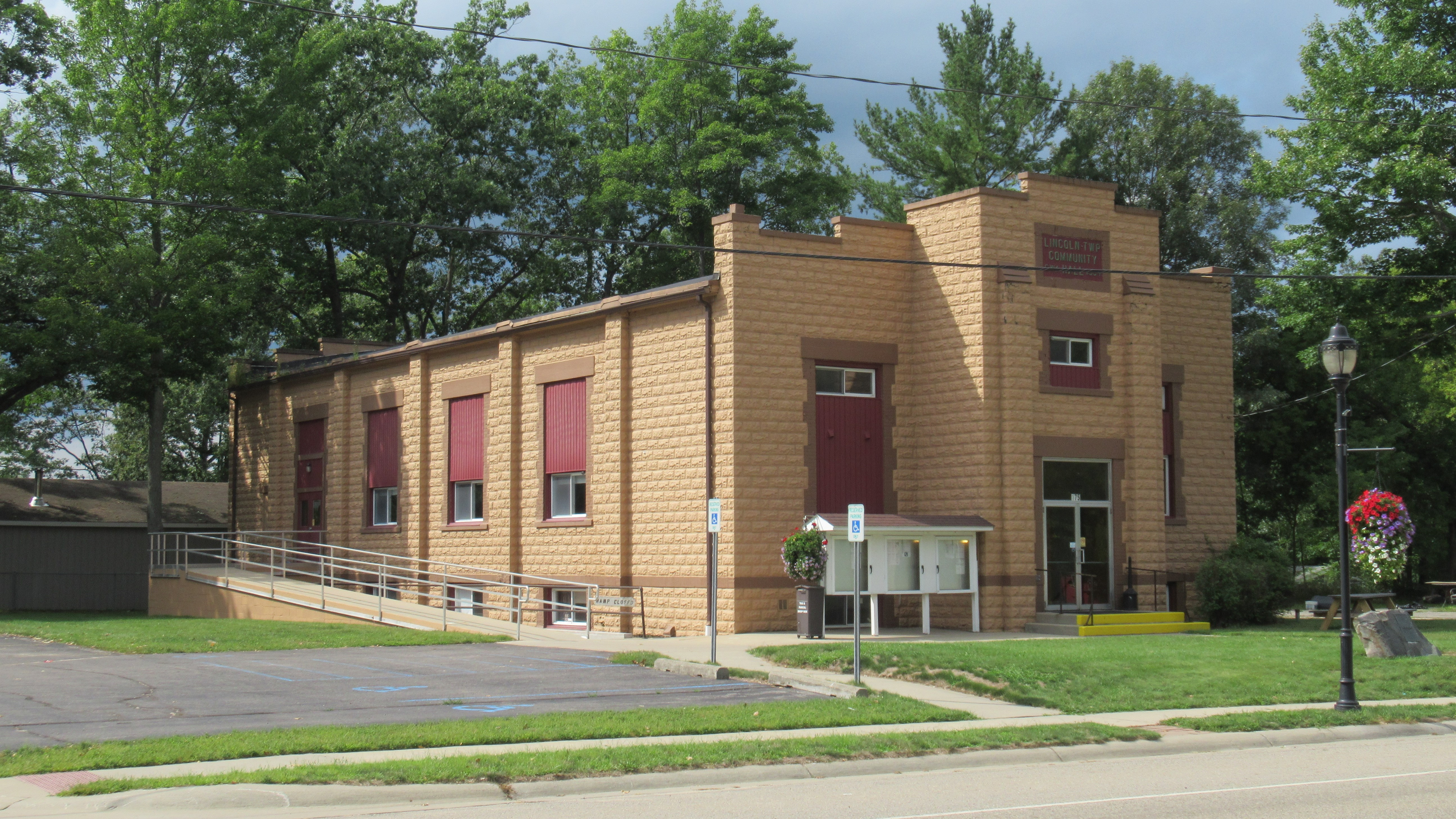
- Lincoln Township Hall in Lake George

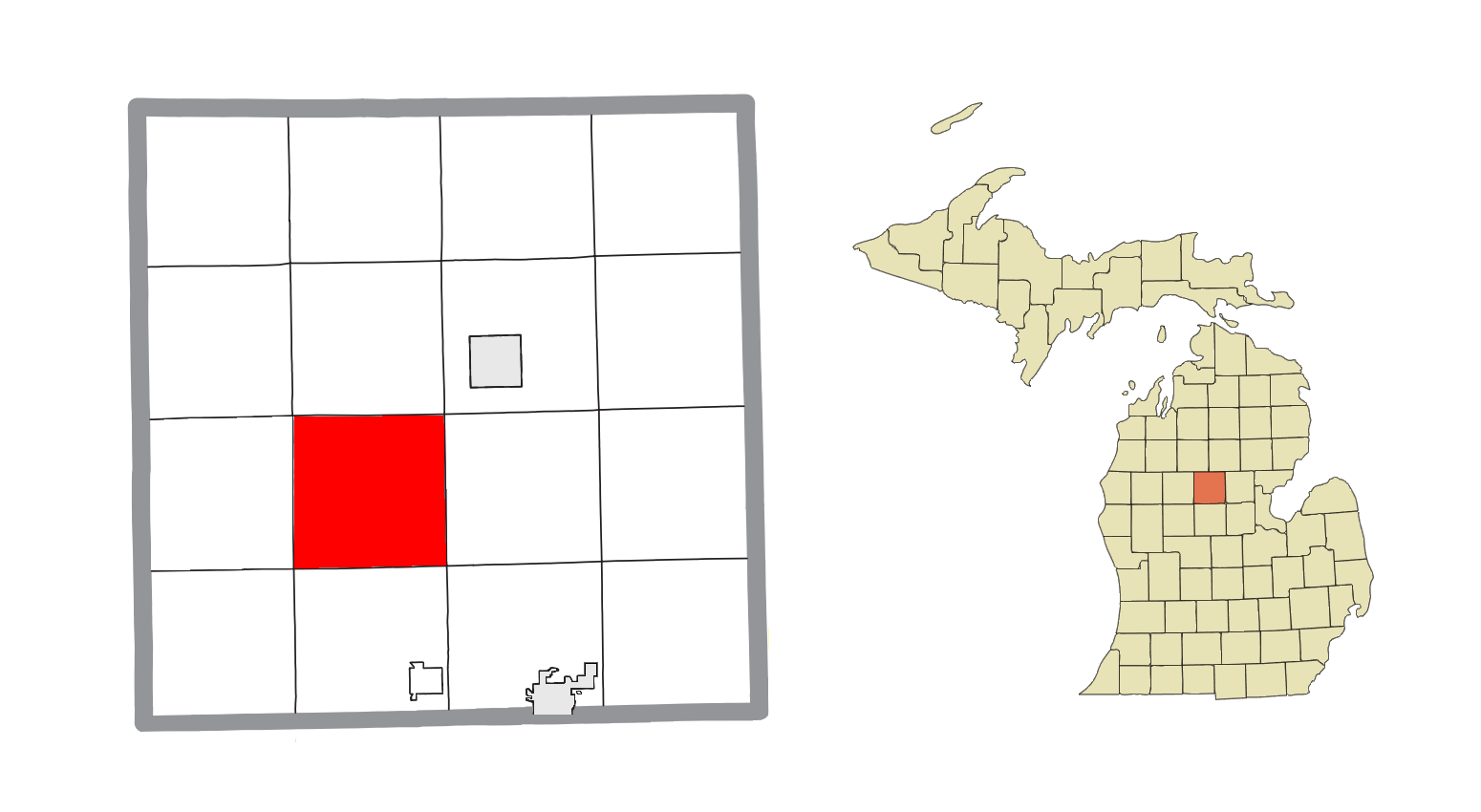
- Location within Clare County

- Location within the state of Michigan Location within the United States
- Coordinates: 43°56′30″N 84°55′21″W
- Country: United States
- State: Michigan
- County: Clare
- Established: 1902

Government
  - Supervisor: Dennis Zimmerman
  - Clerk: Carol Majewski

Area
  - Total: 35.93 sq mi (93.06 km^{2})
  - Land: 35.08 sq mi (90.86 km^{2})
  - Water: 0.85 sq mi (2.20 km^{2})
- Elevation: 1,099 ft (335 m)

Population (2020)
  - Total: 1,805
  - Density: 51.5/sq mi (19.9/km^{2})
- Time zone: UTC-5 (Eastern (EST))
  - Summer (DST): UTC-4 (EDT)
- ZIP code(s): 48622 (Farwell); 48625 (Harrison); 48632 (Lake); 48633 (Lake George)
- Area code: 989
- FIPS code: 26-47620
- GNIS feature ID: 1626620
- Website: Official website

Lincoln Township is a civil township of Clare County in the U.S. state of Michigan. The population was 1,805 at the 2020 census.

== Communities ==
- Lake George is an unincorporated area in the northwest part of the township at 43°57′48″N 84°56′49″W.
- Phelps is an unincorporated community in the southern portion of the township at 43°54′54″N 84°55′25″W.

== Geography ==
According to the U.S. Census Bureau, the township occupies a total area of 35.93 square miles (93.06 km^{2}), of which 35.08 square miles (90.86 km^{2}) is land and 0.85 square miles (2.20 km^{2}) (2.37%) is water.

== Demographics ==
As of the census of 2000, there were 1,758 people, 766 households, and 537 families residing in the township. The population density was 49.9 inhabitants per square mile (19.3/km^{2}). There were 1,949 housing units at an average density of 55.4 per square mile (21.4/km^{2}). The racial makeup of the township was 97.50% White, 0.28% African American, 0.68% Native American, 0.28% Asian, 0.11% from other races, and 1.14% from two or more races. Hispanic or Latino of any race were 1.19% of the population.

There were 766 households, out of which 22.7% had children under the age of 18 living with them, 57.8% were married couples living together, 8.4% had a female householder with no husband present, and 29.8% were non-families. 25.8% of all households were made up of individuals, and 11.6% had someone living alone who was 65 years of age or older. The average household size was 2.30 and the average family size was 2.71.

In the township the population was spread out, with 20.4% under the age of 18, 5.1% from 18 to 24, 23.0% from 25 to 44, 31.6% from 45 to 64, and 19.9% who were 65 years of age or older. The median age was 46 years. For every 100 females, there were 98.9 males. For every 100 females age 18 and over, there were 97.7 males.

The median income for a household in the township was $32,279, and the median income for a family was $38,304. Males had a median income of $31,066 versus $22,000 for females. The per capita income for the township was $18,146. About 9.2% of families and 11.1% of the population were below the poverty line, including 16.1% of those under age 18 and 5.5% of those age 65 or over.

== Education ==
The township is served entirely by Farwell Area Schools to the south in the village of Farwell.
