= George and Martha Hitchcock House =

Historic house in Michigan, United States

- U.S. National Register of Historic Places
- Michigan State Historic Site
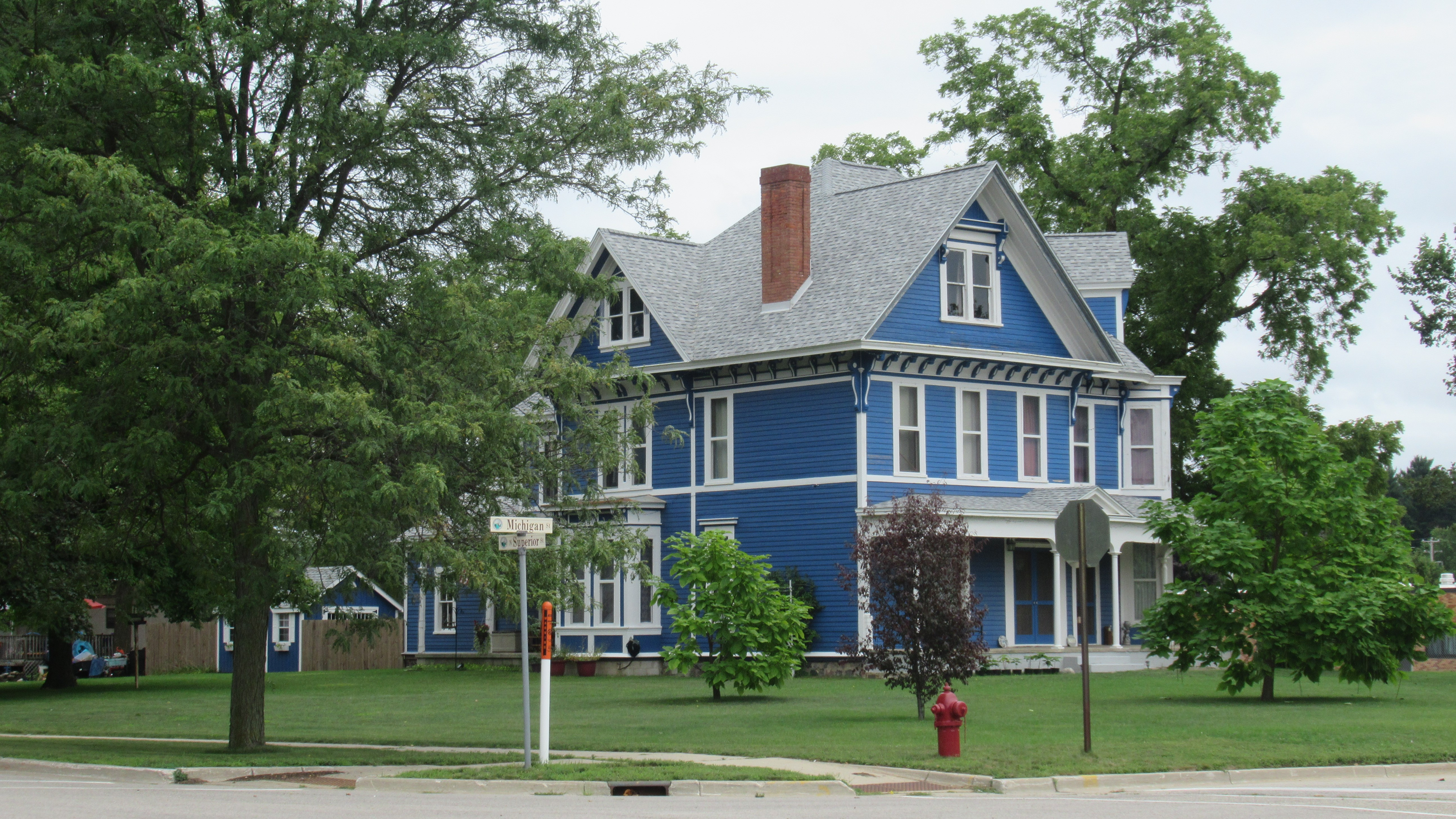

- Location within Michigan Location within the United States
- Interactive map
- Location: 205 E. Michigan St., Farwell, Michigan
- Coordinates: 43°50′11″N 84°51′53″W
- Area: less than one acre
- Built: 1885
- Architect: Mason & Rice
- Architectural style: Queen Anne
- NRHP reference No.: 82002832

Significant dates
- Added to NRHP: June 21, 1982
- Designated MSHS: July 29, 1980

The George and Martha Hitchcock House, also known as the Fuller-McGuire House, is a private house located at 205 East Michigan Street in Farwell, Michigan, United States. It was designated a Michigan State Historic Site in 1996 and listed on the National Register of Historic Places in 1985.

== History ==
George Hitchcock was born in Watertown, Connecticut in 1825. In 1851, he married Martha Hall, daughter of a prominent Detroit family. Hitchcock worked on the railroad for a number of years, and in 1857 moved to Owosso, Michigan and opened a drugstore. He later moved to Isabella County, and in 1870 went into business with his brother-in-law Edmund Hall. In 1871, the Hitchcocks moved to and founded the village of Farwell as part of Hitchcock and Hall's logging operations in Clare County. They established the Farwell City Company, which owned the town, and Farwell became manager of the company. Hitchcock also acted as the city's first postmaster and Clare County's first treasurer, and established sawmills in the area.

After living in the area for some time, George Hitchcock and his wife Martha hired the Detroit firm of Mason & Rice to design this house; construction was completed in 1885. George Hitchcock died in 1889. The house is still privately owned.

== Description ==
The George and Martha Hitchcock House is a two-story asymmetrical wood-framed Queen Anne structure clad with clapboards. The front facade spans four bays, with the rightmost bay recessed, transitioning into a bay window corner. The porch was altered in the 1950s by extending it across the front facade. The attic has a pedimented gable over the three left bays with an elaborate molded lintel.
