= Lake Thirteen =

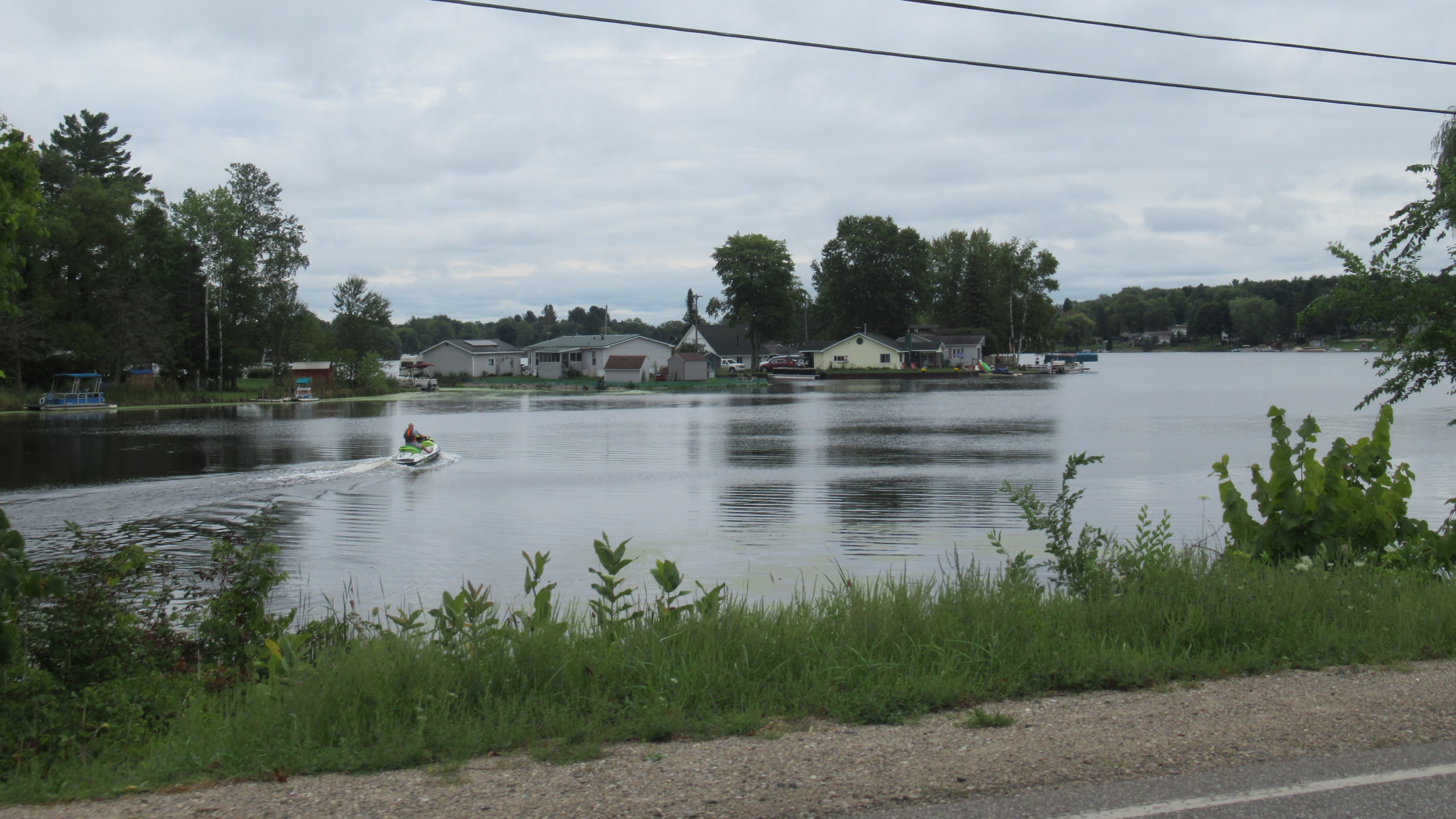
- View of the lake from N. Scott Drive

- Location within the state of Michigan
- Location: Clare County, Michigan
- Coordinates: 43°51.7′N 84°51.6′W
- Type: artificial lake
- Primary inflows: Runyan Creek
- Primary outflows: Runyan Creek
- Basin countries: United States
- Max. length: 3,765 ft (1,148 m)
- Max. width: 1,715 ft (523 m)
- Surface area: 95 acres (38 ha)
- Max. depth: 32 ft (9.8 m)
- Surface elevation: 909 feet (277 m)
- Islands: 1

Lake Thirteen is an artificial lake located in Surrey Township, Clare County, Michigan. The lake spans about 95 acres (38 ha), and reaches a maximum depth of approximately 32 feet (9.8 m).

The lake serves recreational purposes such as watersports and fishing. In most fishing handbooks, the primary fish is listed as bullhead, but largemouth bass and northern pike can also be caught in the lake. In 2002 walleye were planted in the lake, although there have been no reports of consistency in catching them.

== Origin ==
The lake was dug on the creek bed of Runyan Creek, which flows into the lake and is the primary water supply. The water depth varies, anywhere from 2 feet (0.61 m) in some areas, to a maximum of 30 feet (9.1 m). According to an article published in the local newspaper at the time, the lake was formally named Lake 13 by Herschel and Velma Reiss because it is situated in Section 13.

== See also ==
- List of lakes in Michigan
