= Farwell Area Schools =

School district in Michigan, United States

Address
- 399 E. Michigan Street Farwell, Clare County, Michigan, 48622; United States

District information
- Grades: Pre-Kindergarten - 12
- Superintendent: Tom House
- Schools: 4
- Budget: $20,499,000 2021-2022 expenditures
- NCES District ID: 2614100

Students and staff
- Students: 1,000 (2024-2025)
- Teachers: 58.9 (on an FTE basis) (2024-2025)
- Staff: 188.11 FTE (2024-2025)
- Student–teacher ratio: 16.98 (2024-2025)

Other information
- Website: www.farwellschools.net

Farwell Area Schools is a public school district in Central Michigan. In Clare County, it serves Farwell and the townships of Garfield, Lincoln, and Surrey, and parts of the townships of Freeman and Grant. In Isabella County, it serves parts of the townships of Gilmore, Nottawa, and Vernon.

== History ==
In 1870, the first school in the area, Surrey Township School District No. 1 was established. A new frame school with two classrooms was built in 1873. The students were separated into grades in 1891, but it was not until 1905 that grades eleven and twelve were added.

A new school opened in fall 1907. A new gym was added to it in 1934. Outlying districts with small schoolhouses began consolidating with Farwell's district in 1935 and continued into the 1960s. In 1949, a new elementary school was built, followed by the opening of a new high school in January 1955. It was replaced by the current high school, which opened in January 1964. The previous high school became an upper elementary and the 1907 school was then torn down.

=== Farwell School Forest ===
In 1929, Josiah Littlefield donated 91 acres of forest on three parcels to Farwell School district. The district continues to harvest the lumber for woodworking class as well as income. The forests are also used in the natural sciences curriculum and to teach forestry.

== Schools ==
Schools in Farwell Area Schools district share a campus between East Ohio and East Michigan Streets, or at 399 East Michigan Street in Farwell.

Schools in Farwell Area Schools district
School	Address	Notes
Farwell High School	480 E. Ohio St., Farwell	Grades 8-12
Farwell Middle School	500 E. Ohio St., Farwell	Grades 4-7
Farwell Elementary	268 E. Ohio St., Farwell, MI	Grades PreK-3
Farwell Area Early College		Early college high school program at Farwell High School.
