= Pere Marquette State Trail =

Recreational trail in Michigan, United States

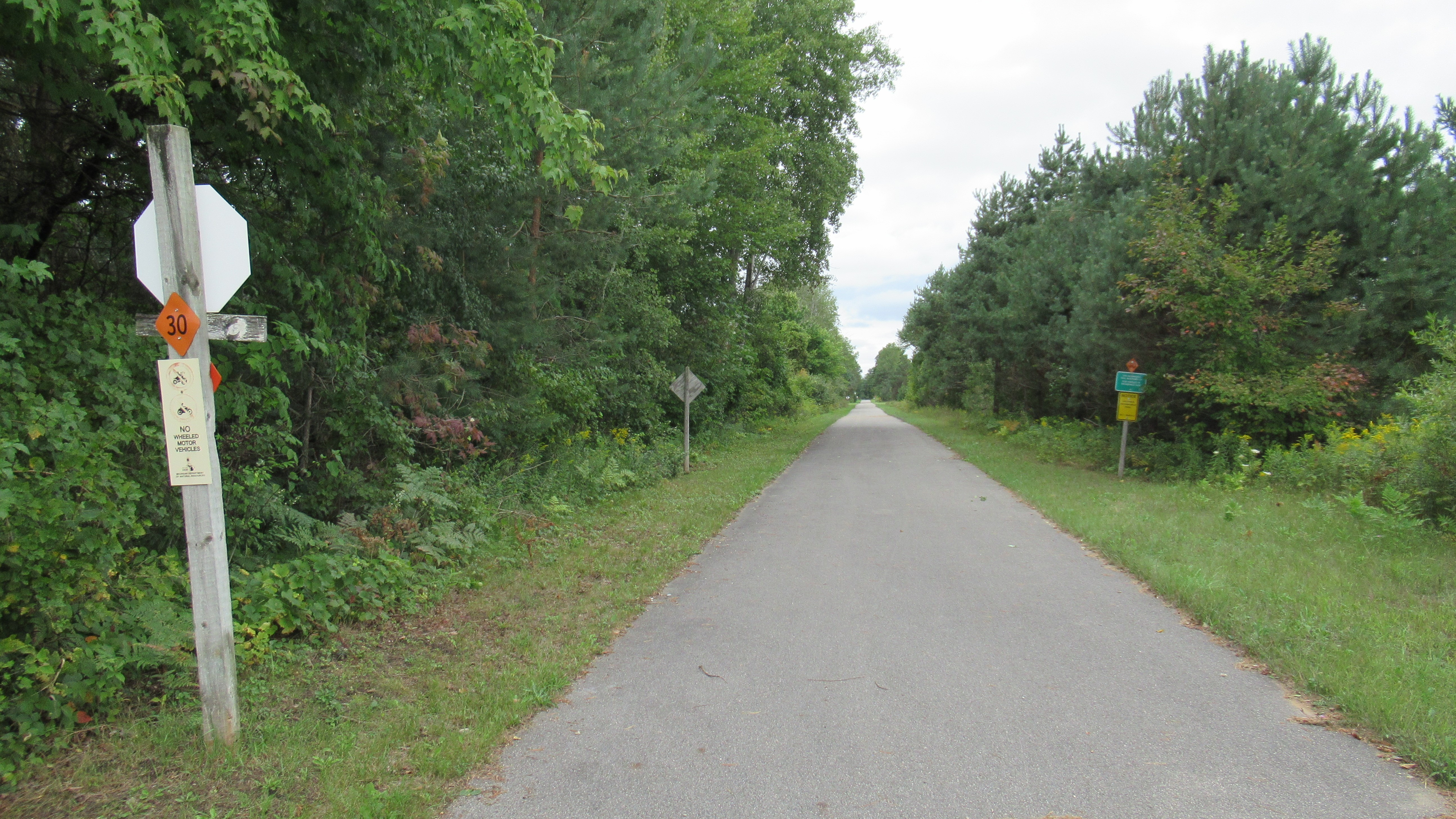
- View of the trail in Grant Township just west of the city of Clare
- Length: 55 mi (89 km)
- Location: Clare, Lake, and Osceola Counties, Michigan
- Trailheads: Baldwin, Michigan; Reed City, Michigan; Hersey, Michigan; Evart, Michigan; Lake, Clare County, Michigan; Farwell, Michigan
- Use: Walking, running, biking, rollerblading
- Difficulty: Easy
- Surface: Asphalt, Ballast, Cinders
Trail map

The Pere Marquette State Trail is a bicycle and multi-use trail in lower Michigan, running 55 miles (89 km) through Clare, Lake, and Osceola Counties. Intersecting with the White Pine Trail in Reed City, the trail is paved in areas, with a ballast or cinder surface elsewhere. The trail's western terminus is the Village of Baldwin with the City of Clare as its eastern terminus. From Baldwin east to The Pere Marquette State Trail is open to non-motorized uses. Except for a gap at its eastern end as the trail enters the City of Clare, it is developed on a former railroad bed. From the City of Clare southeast to Midland, the trail continues as the Pere Marquette Rail Trail.

== Historical background ==
The Pere Marquette Railway ran trains along the route, west past Baldwin to Ludington and east to Saginaw. At Saginaw the trains were timed to meet with separate Bay City-originating trains to Detroit. The PM's successor, the Chesapeake and Ohio Railway ended the Ludington to Saginaw trains in the latter months of 1949.

== Location ==
Pere Marquette State Trail
Location	Coordinates
West of Clare ( M-115)	43°49′40.4″N 84°48′40.0″W
Baldwin ( M-37 (Michigan Ave.))	43°53′50.6″N 85°51′05.9″W
