= Fork Township, Michigan =

- Township
- Location within the state of Michigan Fork Township (the United States)
- Coordinates: 43°46′5″N 85°8′23″W
- Country: United States
- State: Michigan
- County: Mecosta

Area
  - Total: 35.2 sq mi (91 km^{2})
  - Land: 34.8 sq mi (90 km^{2})
  - Water: 0.4 sq mi (1.0 km^{2})
- Elevation: 981 ft (299 m)

Population (2020)
  - Total: 1,627
  - Density: 46.8/sq mi (18.1/km^{2})
- Time zone: UTC-5 (Eastern (EST))
  - Summer (DST): UTC-4 (EDT)
- ZIP Codes: 49305 (Barryton); 49679 (Sears); 48632 (Lake)
- FIPS code: 26-107-29680
- GNIS feature ID: 1626298
- Website: forktownshipmichigan.com

Fork Township is a civil township of Mecosta County in the U.S. state of Michigan. The population was 1,627 at the 2020 census.

== History ==
Fork Township was organized in 1867.

== Communities ==
- Deciple was an unincorporated place focused around a shingle mill. It had a post office from 1884 until 1894.

== Geography ==
Fork Township occupies the northeast corner of Mecosta County, with Osceola County bordering the township to the north, Isabella County bordering it to the east, and Clare County touching the township's northeast corner. The village of Barryton is in the southern part of the township. State highway M-66 crosses the township from south to north.

According to the United States Census Bureau, Fork Township has a total area of 35.2 square miles (91 km^{2}), of which 34.8 square miles (90 km^{2}) are land and 0.4 square miles (1.0 km^{2}), or 1.20%, are water. The township is drained by the North Branch and West Branch of the Chippewa River, which is formed by their confluence in Barryton.

== Demographics ==
As of the census of 2000, there were 1,678 people, 669 households, and 487 families residing in the township. The population density was 48.0 inhabitants per square mile (18.5/km^{2}). There were 950 housing units at an average density of 27.2 per square mile (10.5/km^{2}). The racial makeup of the township was 97.62% White, 0.77% African American, 0.48% Native American, and 1.13% from two or more races. Hispanic or Latino of any race were 1.37% of the population.

There were 669 households, out of which 29.1% had children under the age of 18 living with them, 58.9% were married couples living together, 9.1% had a female householder with no husband present, and 27.1% were non-families. 23.3% of all households were made up of individuals, and 11.4% had someone living alone who was 65 years of age or older. The average household size was 2.50 and the average family size was 2.91.

In the township the population was spread out, with 25.4% under the age of 18, 6.4% from 18 to 24, 24.3% from 25 to 44, 26.1% from 45 to 64, and 17.8% who were 65 years of age or older. The median age was 41 years. For every 100 females, there were 96.9 males. For every 100 females age 18 and over, there were 94.6 males.

The median income for a household in the township was $28,750, and the median income for a family was $31,486. Males had a median income of $27,105 versus $21,397 for females. The per capita income for the township was $14,124. About 11.9% of families and 14.8% of the population were below the poverty line, including 22.4% of those under age 18 and 5.2% of those age 65 or over.
