= Winfield Scott Gerrish =

Lumbering pioneer in the U.S. state of Michigan

Winfield Scott Gerrish (born 15 February 1849 in Lee, Maine—died 19 May 1882 in Evart, Michigan) is credited with revolutionizing lumbering in the U.S. state of Michigan by building a seven-mile-long logging railroad from Lake George to the Muskegon River in Clare County, Michigan in 1877. Although not the first logging railroad in the state, Gerrish's railroad was very successful. Gerrish adopted the idea of using a steam locomotive on steel rails after seeing a Porter 0-4-0 rod engine at the Philadelphia Centennial Exposition. However, twenty years earlier in May 1857, the Blendon Lumber Company successfully and profitably employed a standard gauge steam locomotive on its approximately seven-mile-long logging railroad that extended from the center of Blendon Township in Ottawa County, Michigan to the bank of the Grand River. The use of rail allowed year round transportation of any size tree to the sawmills where unpredictable rivers were previously used.
