= Surrey Township, Michigan =

- Civil township
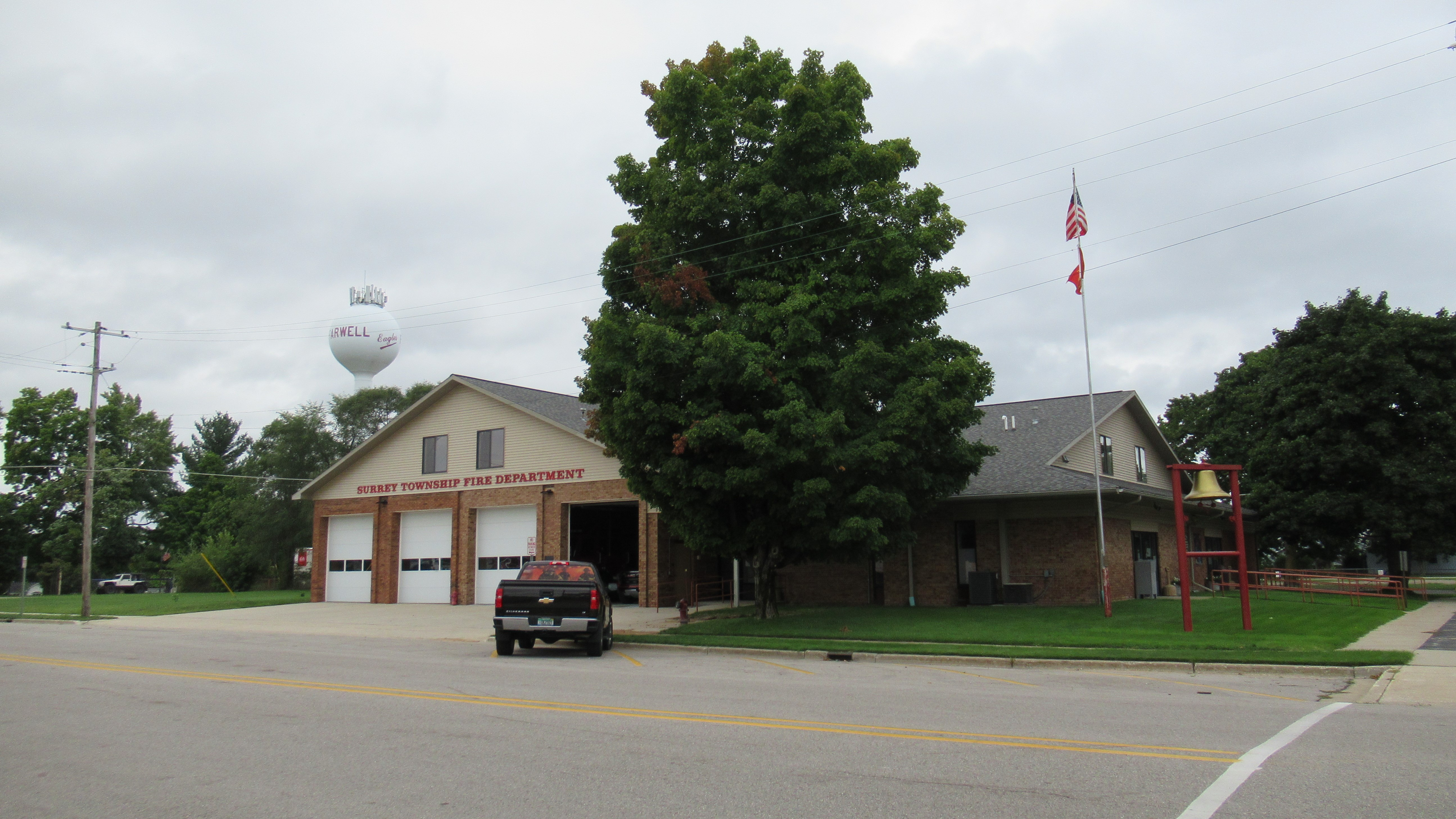
- Surrey Township Offices and Fire Department

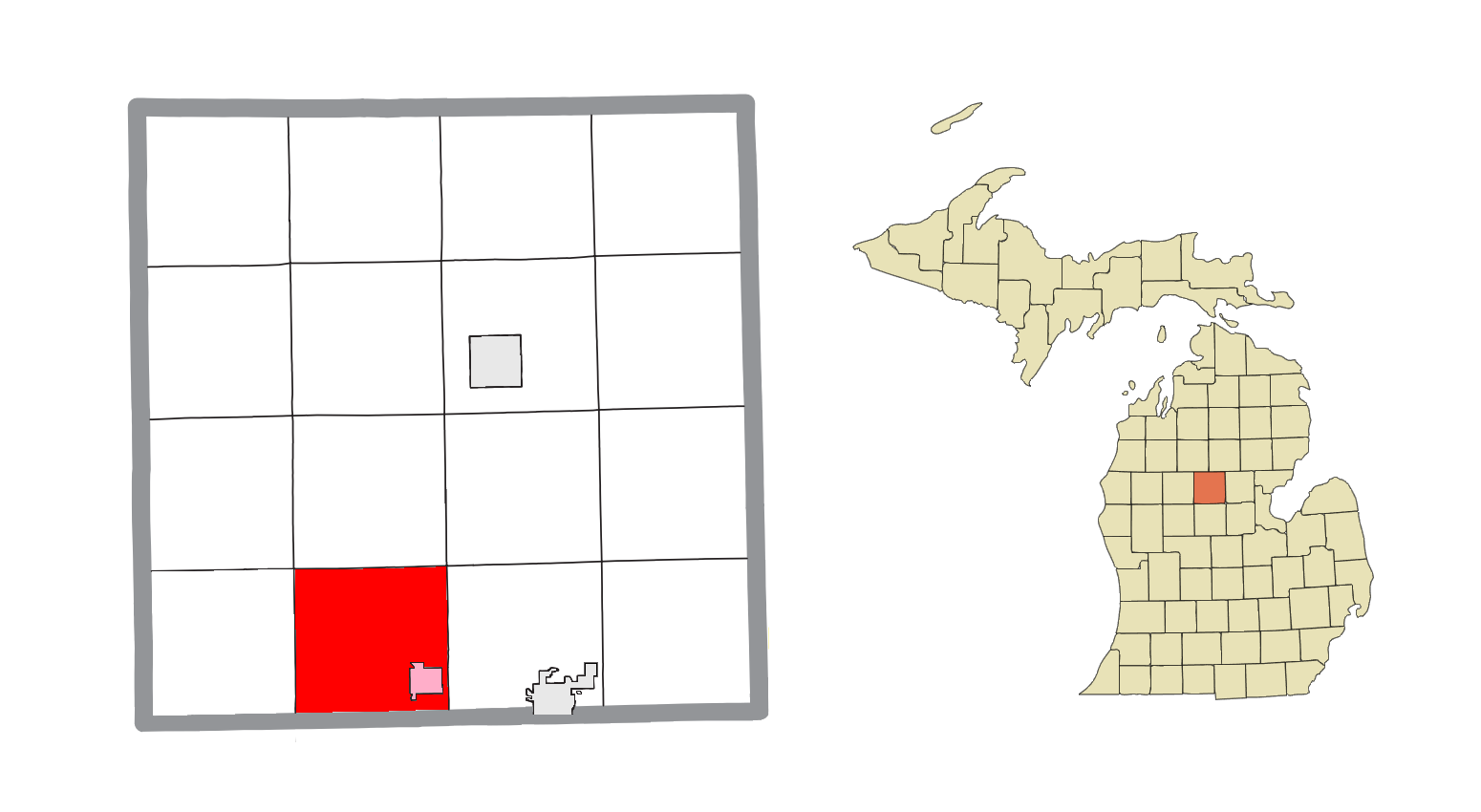
- Location within Clare County (red) and the administered village of Farwell (pink)

- Location within the state of Michigan Surrey Township (the United States)
- Coordinates: 43°51′01″N 84°53′18″W
- Country: United States
- State: Michigan
- County: Clare
- Established: 1871
- Named for: Surrey, England

Government
  - Supervisor: Russ Hamilton
  - Clerk: Glenna Bradbury

Area
  - Total: 35.81 sq mi (92.75 km^{2})
  - Land: 35.10 sq mi (90.91 km^{2})
  - Water: 0.71 sq mi (1.84 km^{2})
- Elevation: 965 ft (294 m)

Population (2020)
  - Total: 3,635
  - Density: 103.6/sq mi (40.0/km^{2})
- Time zone: UTC-5 (Eastern (EST))
  - Summer (DST): UTC-4 (EDT)
- ZIP code(s): 48622 (Farwell); 48632 (Lake)
- Area code: 989
- FIPS code: 26-77580
- GNIS feature ID: 1627142
- Website: Official website

Surrey Township (/ʃəˈriː/) is a civil township of Clare County in the U.S. state of Michigan. The population was 3,635 at the 2020 census.

== Communities ==
- Farwell is an incorporated village located in the southeast portion of the township at 43°50′08″N 84°52′04″W.

== Geography ==
According to the U.S. Census Bureau, the township has a total area of 35.81 square miles (92.75 km^{2}), of which 35.10 square miles (90.91 km^{2}) is land and 0.71 square miles (1.84 km^{2}) (1.98%) is water.

The South Branch of the Tobacco River flows through the southern portion of the township. The township also contains numerous lakes, including Lake Thirteen.

=== Major highways ===
- US 10 runs west–east through the center of the township.
- M-115 runs northwest-southeast diagonally through the township.

== Demographics ==
As of the census of 2000, there were 3,555 people, 1,444 households, and 984 families residing in the township. The population density was 100.8 inhabitants per square mile (38.9/km^{2}). There were 1,989 housing units at an average density of 56.4 per square mile (21.8/km^{2}). The racial makeup of the township was 97.72% White, 0.28% African American, 0.98% Native American, 0.28% Asian, 0.11% from other races, and 0.62% from two or more races. Hispanic or Latino of any race were 1.10% of the population.

There were 1,444 households, out of which 27.2% had children under the age of 18 living with them, 54.2% were married couples living together, 10.3% had a female householder with no husband present, and 31.8% were non-families. 27.1% of all households were made up of individuals, and 12.0% had someone living alone who was 65 years of age or older. The average household size was 2.39 and the average family size was 2.86.

In the township the population was spread out, with 22.5% under the age of 18, 7.1% from 18 to 24, 25.5% from 25 to 44, 26.0% from 45 to 64, and 19.0% who were 65 years of age or older. The median age was 42 years. For every 100 females, there were 93.0 males. For every 100 females age 18 and over, there were 90.4 males.

The median income for a household in the township was $28,350, and the median income for a family was $32,475. Males had a median income of $30,938 versus $21,779 for females. The per capita income for the township was $17,027. About 7.7% of families and 11.0% of the population were below the poverty line, including 12.8% of those under age 18 and 4.2% of those age 65 or over.

== Education ==
The entire township is served by Farwell Area Schools within the township in the village of Farwell.
