= Barryton, Michigan =

- Village
- Motto: Life is Good Where the Rivers Meet
- Location in Mecosta, Michigan
- Coordinates: 43°45′2″N 85°8′37″W
- Country: United States
- State: Michigan
- County: Mecosta
- Township: Fork
- Established: 1894

Area
  - Total: 1.03 sq mi (2.68 km^{2})
  - Land: 0.96 sq mi (2.48 km^{2})
  - Water: 0.077 sq mi (0.20 km^{2})
- Elevation: 981 ft (299 m)

Population (2020)
  - Total: 405
  - Density: 423.0/sq mi (163.33/km^{2})
- Time zone: UTC-5 (Eastern (EST))
  - Summer (DST): UTC-4 (EDT)
- ZIP code: 49305
- Area code: 989
- FIPS code: 26-05580
- GNIS feature ID: 2398039
- Website: https://villageofbarryton.com/?page_id=2

Barryton (/bɛər.ətən/ BAIR-ə-tən) is a village in Mecosta County in the U.S. state of Michigan. The population was 405 at the 2020 census, up from 355 in 2010. The village is located in Fork Township on M-66.

== History ==
The village of Barryton was established in 1894.

In 2020, a petition was started to dissolve the village. The petition gained enough signatures to be placed on the ballot for the 2020 election. The measure was subsequently defeated. If it had succeeded, it would have been the first village to ever voluntarily disincorporate in the state of Michigan.

== Geography ==
Barryton is in northeastern Mecosta County, in the southern part of Fork Township. It is 21 miles (34 km) by road east of Big Rapids, the county seat, and 30 miles (48 km) northwest of Mount Pleasant. According to the U.S. Census Bureau, the village has a total area of 1.03 square miles (2.67 km^{2}), of which 0.96 square miles (2.49 km^{2}) are land and 0.08 square miles (0.21 km^{2}), or 7.54%, are water. The West Branch and the North Branch of the Chippewa River join in Barryton to form the main stem of the Chippewa, part of the Saginaw River watershed.

=== Major highway ===
- M-66 runs north-south through the village of Barryton.

== Demographics ==
Historical population
Census	Pop.	Note	%±
1910	411		—
1920	364		−11.4%
1930	331		−9.1%
1940	342		3.3%
1950	445		30.1%
1960	418		−6.1%
1970	368		−12.0%
1980	422		14.7%
1990	393		−6.9%
2000	381		−3.1%
2010	355		−6.8%
2020	405		14.1%
U.S. Decennial Census

=== 2010 census ===
As of the census of 2010, there were 355 people, 154 households, and 89 families residing in the village. The population density was 369.8 inhabitants per square mile (142.8/km^{2}). There were 195 housing units at an average density of 203.1 per square mile (78.4/km^{2}). The racial makeup of the village was 98.0% White, 0.3% African American, 0.3% Native American, 0.3% Asian, and 1.1% from two or more races. Hispanic or Latino of any race were 0.6% of the population.

There were 154 households, of which 26.0% had children under the age of 18 living with them, 39.0% were married couples living together, 13.6% had a female householder with no husband present, 5.2% had a male householder with no wife present, and 42.2% were non-families. 39.6% of all households were made up of individuals, and 20.1% had someone living alone who was 65 years of age or older. The average household size was 2.31 and the average family size was 2.92.

The median age in the village was 41.2 years. 22% of residents were under the age of 18; 13.7% were between the ages of 18 and 24; 19.7% were from 25 to 44; 21.1% were from 45 to 64; and 23.4% were 65 years of age or older. The gender makeup of the village was 48.7% male and 51.3% female.

=== 2000 census ===
As of the census of 2000, there were 381 people, 159 households, and 104 families residing in the village. The population density was 402.6 inhabitants per square mile (155.4/km^{2}). There were 188 housing units at an average density of 198.7 per square mile (76.7/km^{2}). The racial makeup of the village was 95.28% White, 1.84% African American, 0.79% Native American, and 2.10% from two or more races. Hispanic or Latino of any race were 1.57% of the population.

There were 159 households, out of which 31.4% had children under the age of 18 living with them, 45.3% were married couples living together, 13.8% had a female householder with no husband present, and 34.0% were non-families. 28.9% of all households were made up of individuals, and 17.0% had someone living alone who was 65 years of age or older. The average household size was 2.39 and the average family size was 2.90.

In the village, the population was spread out, with 28.6% under the age of 18, 7.3% from 18 to 24, 23.6% from 25 to 44, 21.0% from 45 to 64, and 19.4% who were 65 years of age or older. The median age was 38 years. For every 100 females, there were 95.4 males. For every 100 females age 18 and over, there were 83.8 males.

The median income for a household in the village was $23,333, and the median income for a family was $28,750. Males had a median income of $28,125 versus $21,250 for females. The per capita income for the village was $12,166. About 15.1% of families and 18.0% of the population were below the poverty line, including 22.8% of those under age 18 and 12.7% of those age 65 or over.

== Culture ==
Barryton is home to the Barryton Lilac Festival. The annual festival is held the first full weekend of June and includes a car show, carnival rides, 5k race, flea market, and parade.

== Education ==
Barryton has one elementary school, Barryton Elementary. The original school was built in 1935 (with a new one completed in 2020) and has about 260 students from preschool to fourth grade. The school is part of Chippewa Hills School District.
