= Freeman Township, Michigan =

- Civil township
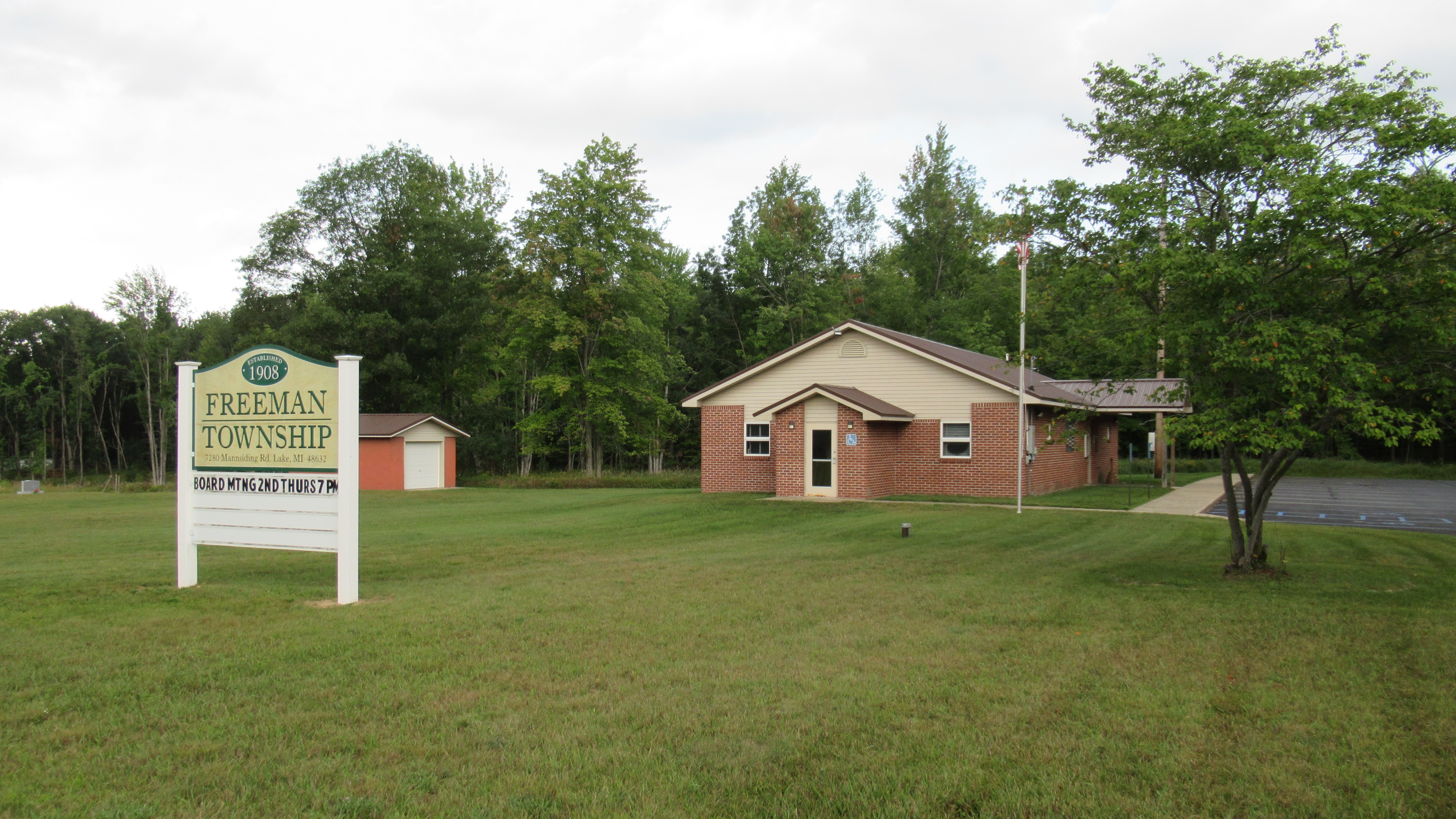
- Freeman Township Hall

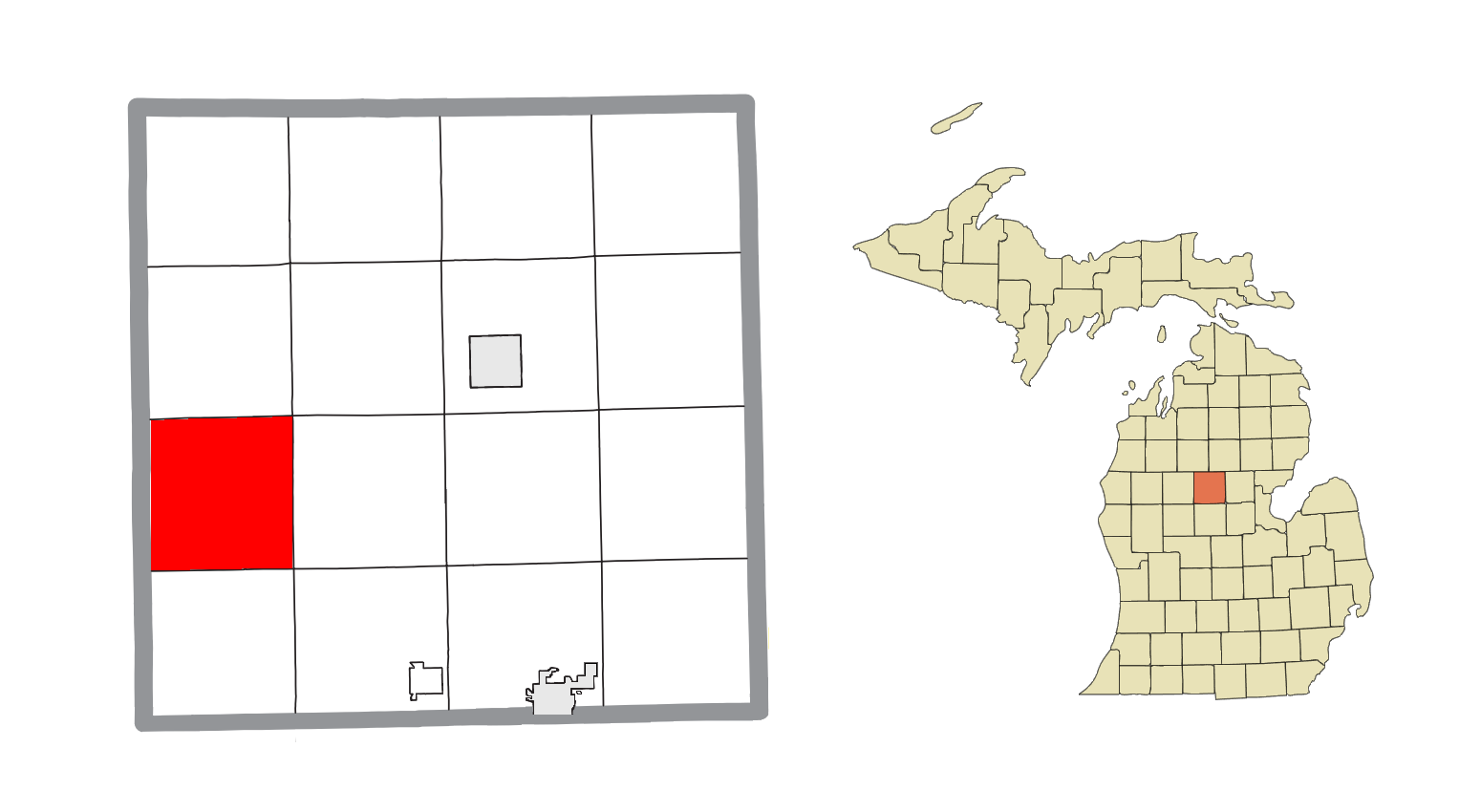
- Location within Clare County

- Location within the state of Michigan Location within the United States
- Coordinates: 43°56′32″N 85°01′28″W
- Country: United States
- State: Michigan
- County: Clare
- Established: 1908

Government
  - Supervisor: Alan Housler
  - Clerk: Lacinda LaFave

Area
  - Total: 35.80 sq mi (92.72 km^{2})
  - Land: 34.58 sq mi (89.56 km^{2})
  - Water: 1.22 sq mi (3.16 km^{2})
- Elevation: 1,056 ft (322 m)

Population (2020)
  - Total: 1,125
  - Density: 32.5/sq mi (12.5/km^{2})
- Time zone: UTC-5 (Eastern (EST))
  - Summer (DST): UTC-4 (EDT)
- ZIP code(s): 48632 (Lake); 49665 (Marion)
- Area code: 989
- FIPS code: 26-30560
- GNIS feature ID: 1626314
- Website: Official website

Freeman Township is a civil township of Clare County in the U.S. state of Michigan. The population was 1,125 at the 2020 census.

== Geography ==
According to the U.S. Census Bureau, the township has a total area of 35.80 square miles (92.72 km^{2}), of which 34.58 square miles (89.56 km^{2}) is land and 1.22 square miles (3.16 km^{2}) (3.41%) is water.

The township contains numerous small lakes, including Doc and Tom Lake, Windover Lake, and Big Norway Lake.

=== Major highways ===
- M-115 (Cadillac Drive) runs diagonally southeast–southwest through the township.

== Demographics ==
As of the census of 2000, there were 1,118 people, 469 households, and 347 families residing in the township. The population density was 32.3 inhabitants per square mile (12.5/km^{2}). There were 933 housing units at an average density of 27.0 per square mile (10.4/km^{2}). The racial makeup of the township was 97.94% White, 1.43% Native American, 0.09% Pacific Islander, and 0.54% from two or more races. Hispanic or Latino of any race were 1.34% of the population.

There were 469 households, out of which 20.7% had children under the age of 18 living with them, 63.3% were married couples living together, 6.6% had a female householder with no husband present, and 26.0% were non-families. 20.0% of all households were made up of individuals, and 8.7% had someone living alone who was 65 years of age or older. The average household size was 2.38 and the average family size was 2.70.

In the township the population was spread out, with 20.8% under the age of 18, 4.8% from 18 to 24, 19.7% from 25 to 44, 33.0% from 45 to 64, and 21.7% who were 65 years of age or older. The median age was 49 years. For every 100 females, there were 102.5 males. For every 100 females age 18 and over, there were 102.7 males.

The median income for a household in the township was $30,398, and the median income for a family was $33,333. Males had a median income of $28,036 versus $21,696 for females. The per capita income for the township was $14,624. About 10.5% of families and 13.0% of the population were below the poverty line, including 16.9% of those under age 18 and 7.1% of those age 65 or over.

== Education ==
The entire township is served by Harrison Community Schools to the southwest in Harrison.
