= Lake George, Michigan =

- Unincorporated community
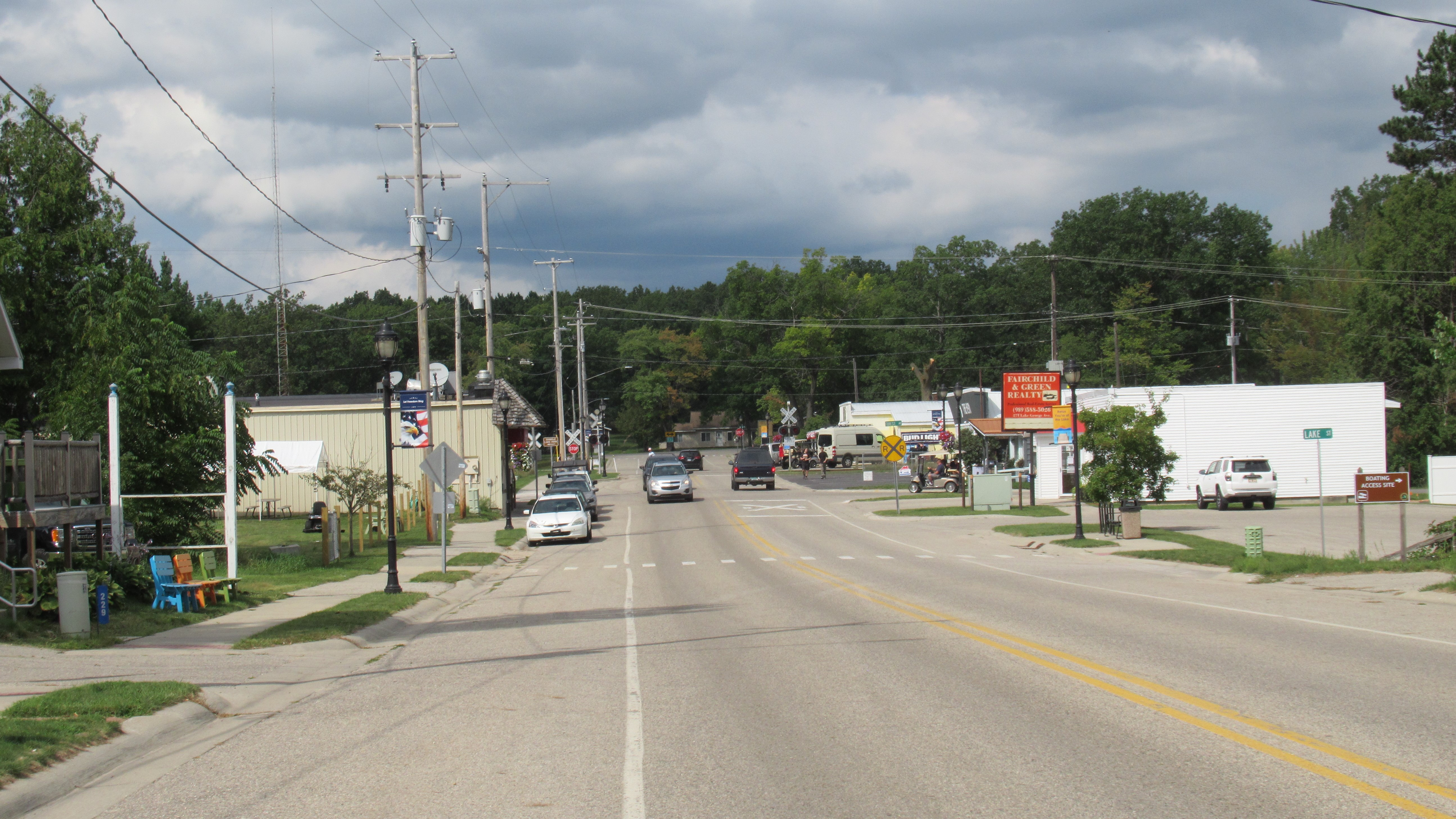
- Looking north along Lake George Street

- Location within the state of Michigan Location within the United States
- Coordinates: 43°57′48″N 84°56′49″W
- Country: United States
- State: Michigan
- County: Clare
- Township: Lincoln
- Established: 1899
- Elevation: 1,112 ft (339 m)
- Time zone: UTC-5 (Eastern (EST))
  - Summer (DST): UTC-4 (EDT)
- ZIP code(s): 48633
- Area code: 989
- GNIS feature ID: 629975

Lake George is an unincorporated community in Lincoln Township, Clare County in the U.S. state of Michigan. The town is at the northern end of Lake George at 43°57′48″N 84°56′49″W. The ZIP code for Lake George, is 48633 and provides P.O. Box service to an area on the northern side of Lake George. A post office was established on December 8, 1899. As of 2021, the 48633 ZIP Code Tabulation Area had a population of 107.

Lake George was originally founded as a lumber settlement by George Lake. It was a station on the Toledo, Ann Arbor and North Michigan Railway.

Winfield Scott Gerrish is credited with revolutionizing lumbering in Michigan by building a seven-mile-long logging railroad from Lake George to the Muskegon River in Clare County.

The area is mostly wooded land with a variety of wildlife including white-tail deer, wild turkey, pheasant, and other game animals. Fishing is very popular in the area with numerous lakes (10 within a 10-mile radius) containing largemouth bass, perch, bluegill, sunfish, pike, musky, bullhead catfish, and rock bass.

The population of the area is somewhat mixed. It mainly consists of the original pioneer families and the tourists who stay there during the summer season.

There was a train depot (no longer standing) where two trains crashed on July 19, 1925.

The current "Depot" party store was originally built in 1937 by John Seats Sr. The post office was also inside the grocery store, run by Lula Seats. The store was in the Seats' family until 1973, and three generations of the family worked there.

== Images ==
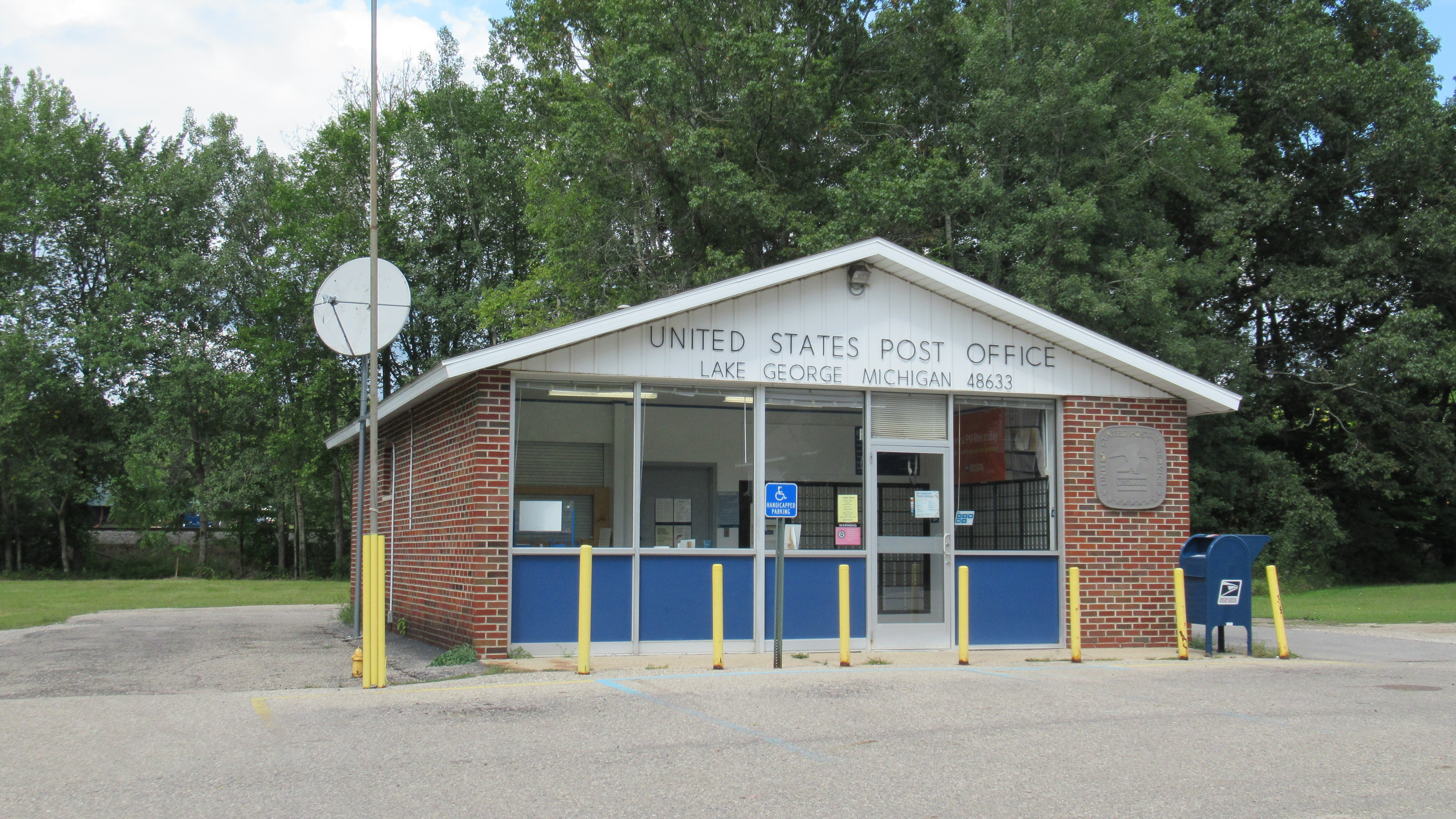
U.S. Post Office in Lake George

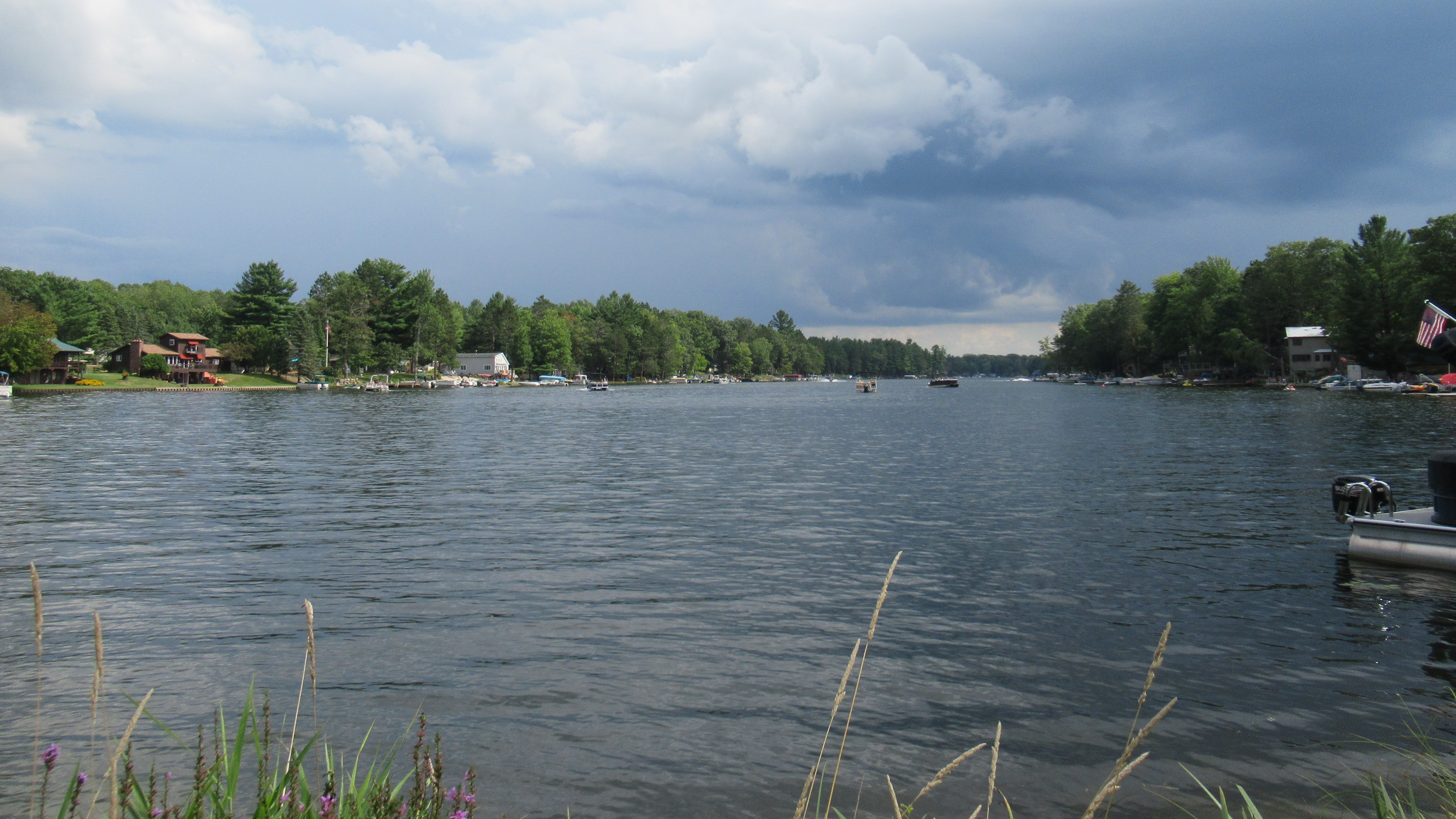
View of Lake George

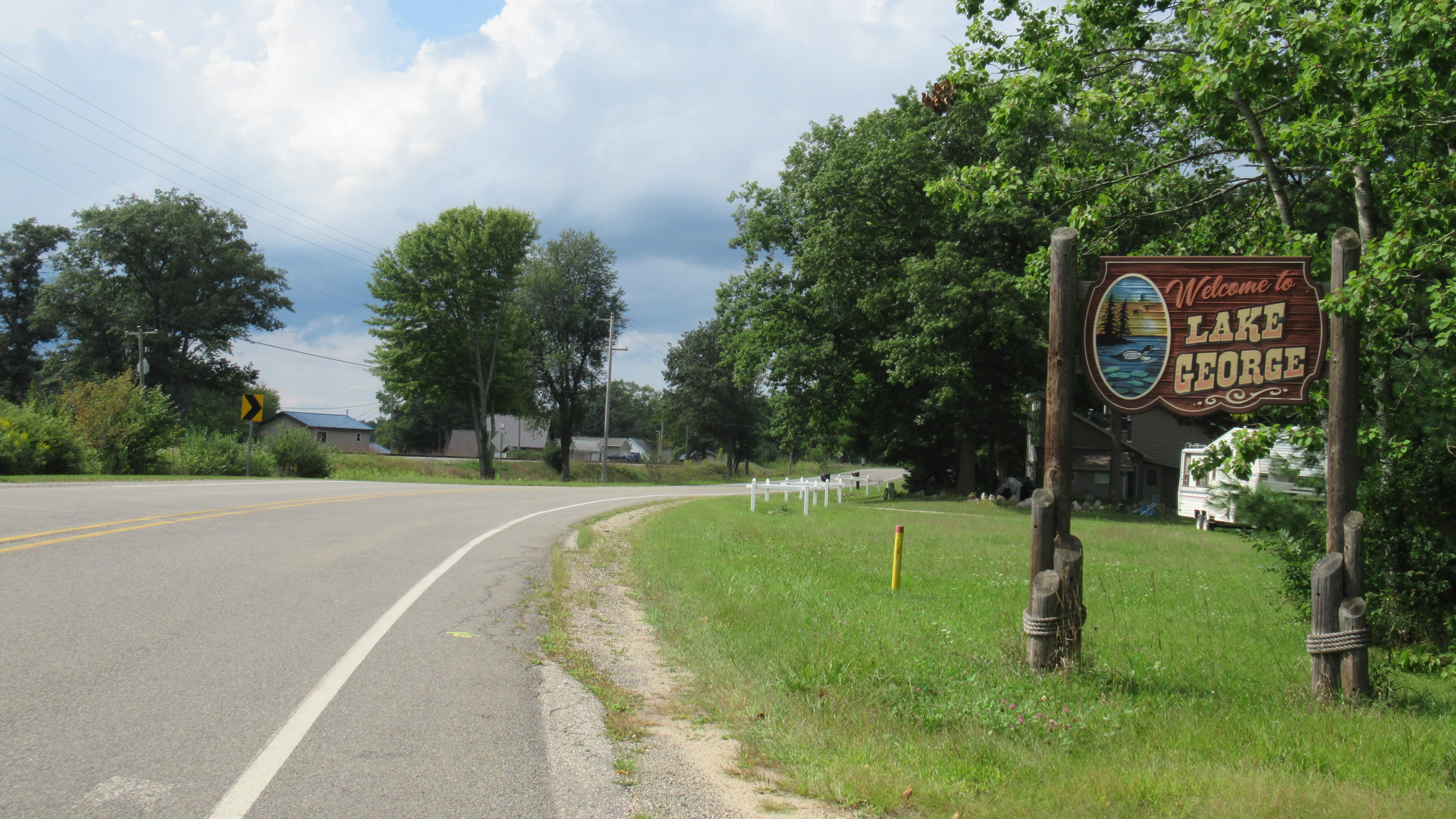
Road signage along Mannsiding Road
