= Garfield Township, Clare County, Michigan =

Garfield Township, Michigan
- Civil township
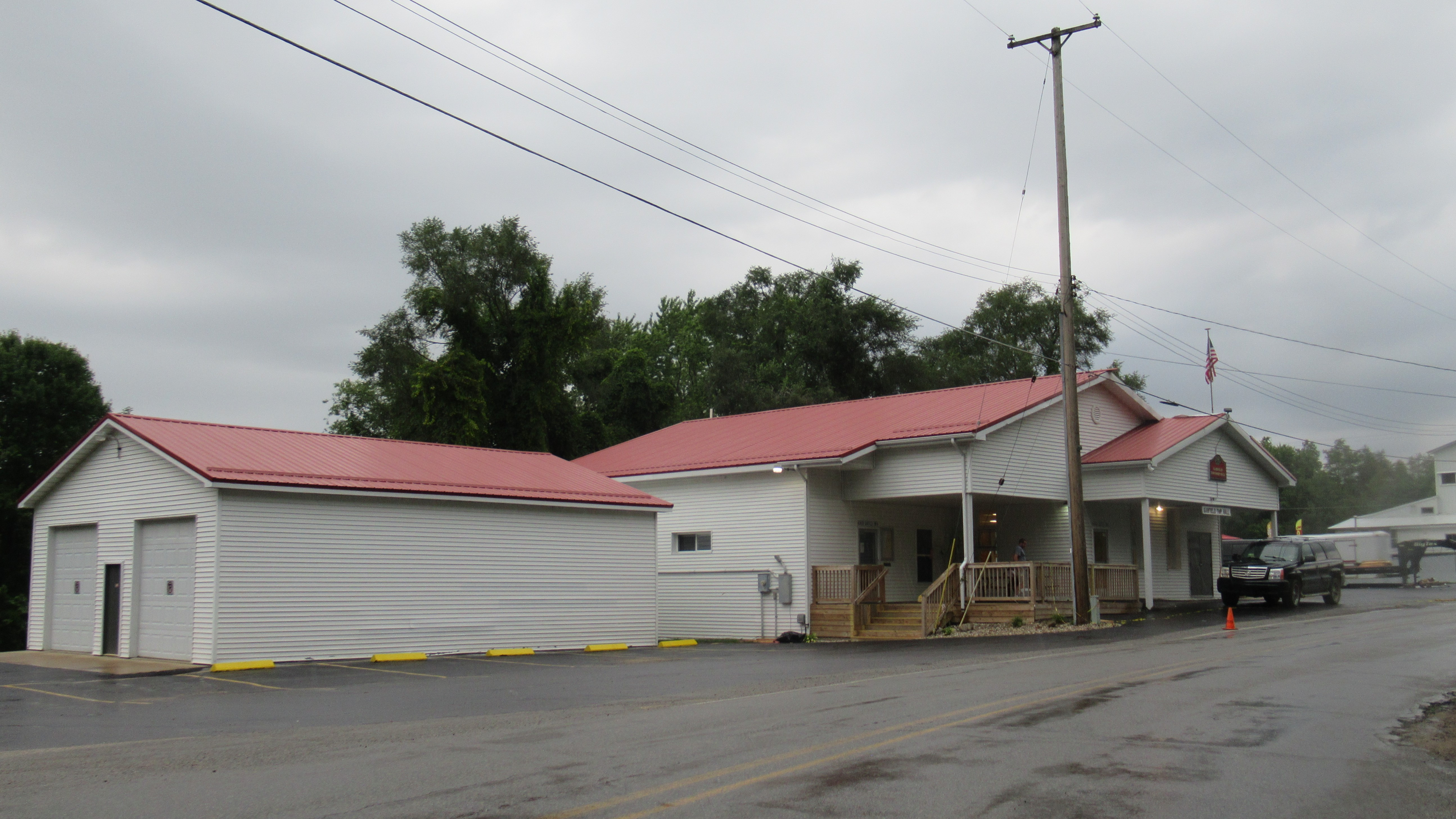
- Garfield Township Hall in Lake

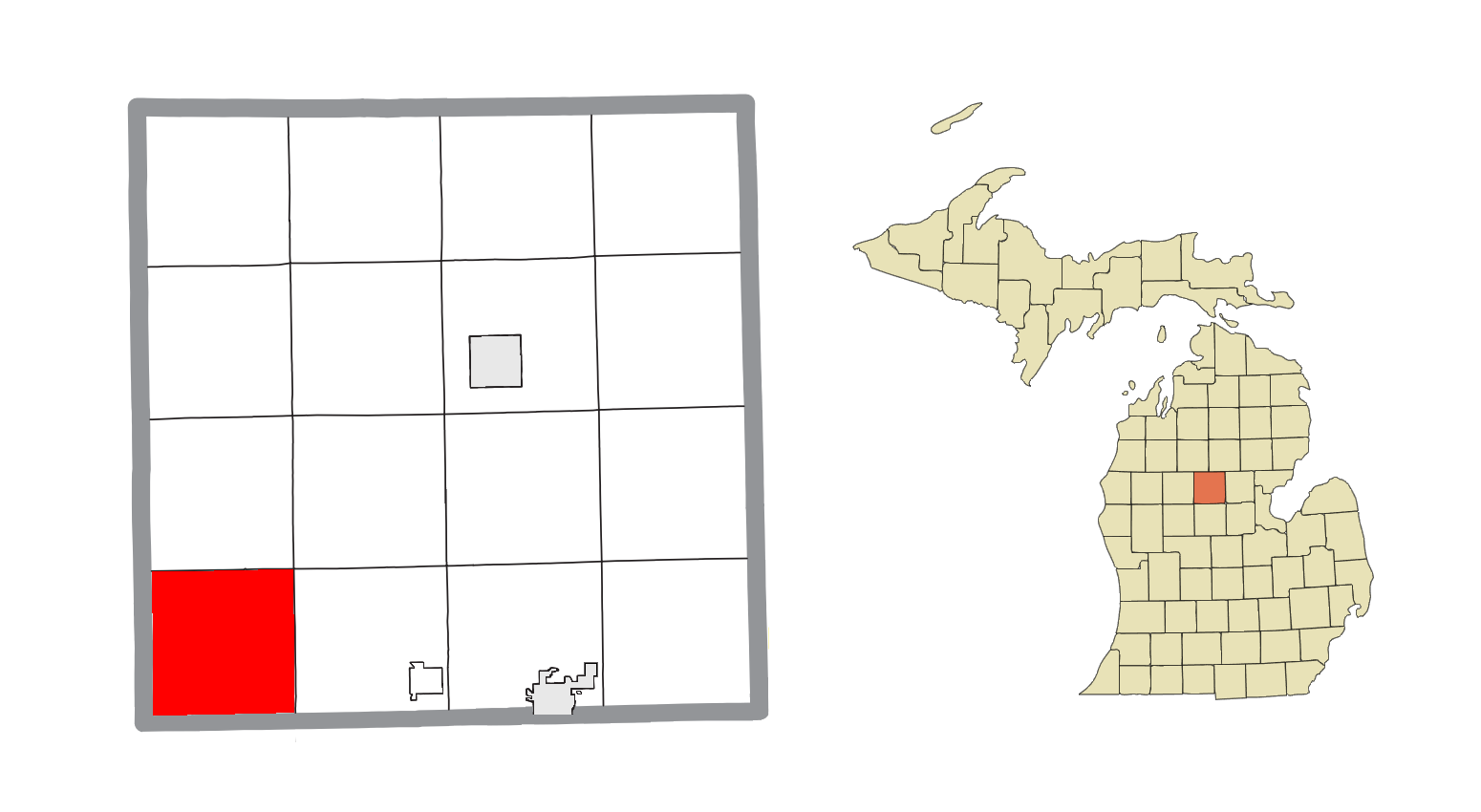
- Location within Clare County

- Location within the state of Michigan Location within the United States
- Coordinates: 43°51′37″N 85°01′34″W
- Country: United States
- State: Michigan
- County: Clare
- Established: 1897

Government
  - Supervisor: David Byl
  - Clerk: Janet Clayton

Area
  - Total: 35.77 sq mi (92.64 km^{2})
  - Land: 33.39 sq mi (86.48 km^{2})
  - Water: 2.38 sq mi (6.16 km^{2})
- Elevation: 1,063 ft (324 m)

Population (2020)
  - Total: 1,807
  - Density: 54.1/sq mi (20.9/km^{2})
- Time zone: UTC-5 (Eastern (EST))
  - Summer (DST): UTC-4 (EDT)
- ZIP code(s): 48622 (Farwell); 48632 (Lake)
- Area code: 989
- FIPS code: 26-31560
- GNIS feature ID: 1626336
- Website: Official website

Garfield Township is a civil township of Clare County in the U.S. state of Michigan. The population was 1,807 at the 2020 census.

== Communities ==
- Lake is an unincorporated community within the township near U.S Route 10 at 43°51′07″N 85°00′19″W. The Lake 48632 ZIP Code serves the majority of the township, as well as portions of several surrounding townships in multiple counties.

== Geography ==
According to the U.S. Census Bureau, the township has a total area of 35.77 square miles (92.64 km^{2}), of which 33.39 square miles (86.48 km^{2}) is land and 2.38 square miles (6.16 km^{2}) (6.65%) is water.

=== Major highways ===
- US 10 (W. Ludington Drive) runs west–east through the center of the township.
- M-115 (W. Cadillac Drive) runs very briefly through the northeast corner of the township.

== Demographics ==
As of the census of 2000, there were 1,968 people, 852 households, and 581 families residing in the township. The population density was 58.9 inhabitants per square mile (22.7/km^{2}). There were 1,936 housing units at an average density of 58.0 per square mile (22.4/km^{2}). The racial makeup of the township was 98.07% White, 0.66% Native American, 0.05% Asian, 0.20% from other races, and 1.02% from two or more races. Hispanic or Latino of any race were 0.86% of the population.

There were 852 households, out of which 23.5% had children under the age of 18 living with them, 54.8% were married couples living together, 8.5% had a female householder with no husband present, and 31.7% were non-families. 26.5% of all households were made up of individuals, and 12.6% had someone living alone who was 65 years of age or older. The average household size was 2.29 and the average family size was 2.68.

In the township the population was spread out, with 21.4% under the age of 18, 6.7% from 18 to 24, 24.1% from 25 to 44, 27.7% from 45 to 64, and 20.1% who were 65 years of age or older. The median age was 43 years. For every 100 females, there were 99.0 males. For every 100 females age 18 and over, there were 99.0 males.

The median income for a household in the township was $29,038, and the median income for a family was $32,813. Males had a median income of $26,357 versus $19,000 for females. The per capita income for the township was $17,209. About 6.7% of families and 12.7% of the population were below the poverty line, including 20.1% of those under age 18 and 6.8% of those age 65 or over.

== Education ==
The entire township is served by Farwell Area Schools to the east in the village of Farwell.
