= Farwell, Michigan =

- Village
- Village of Farwell
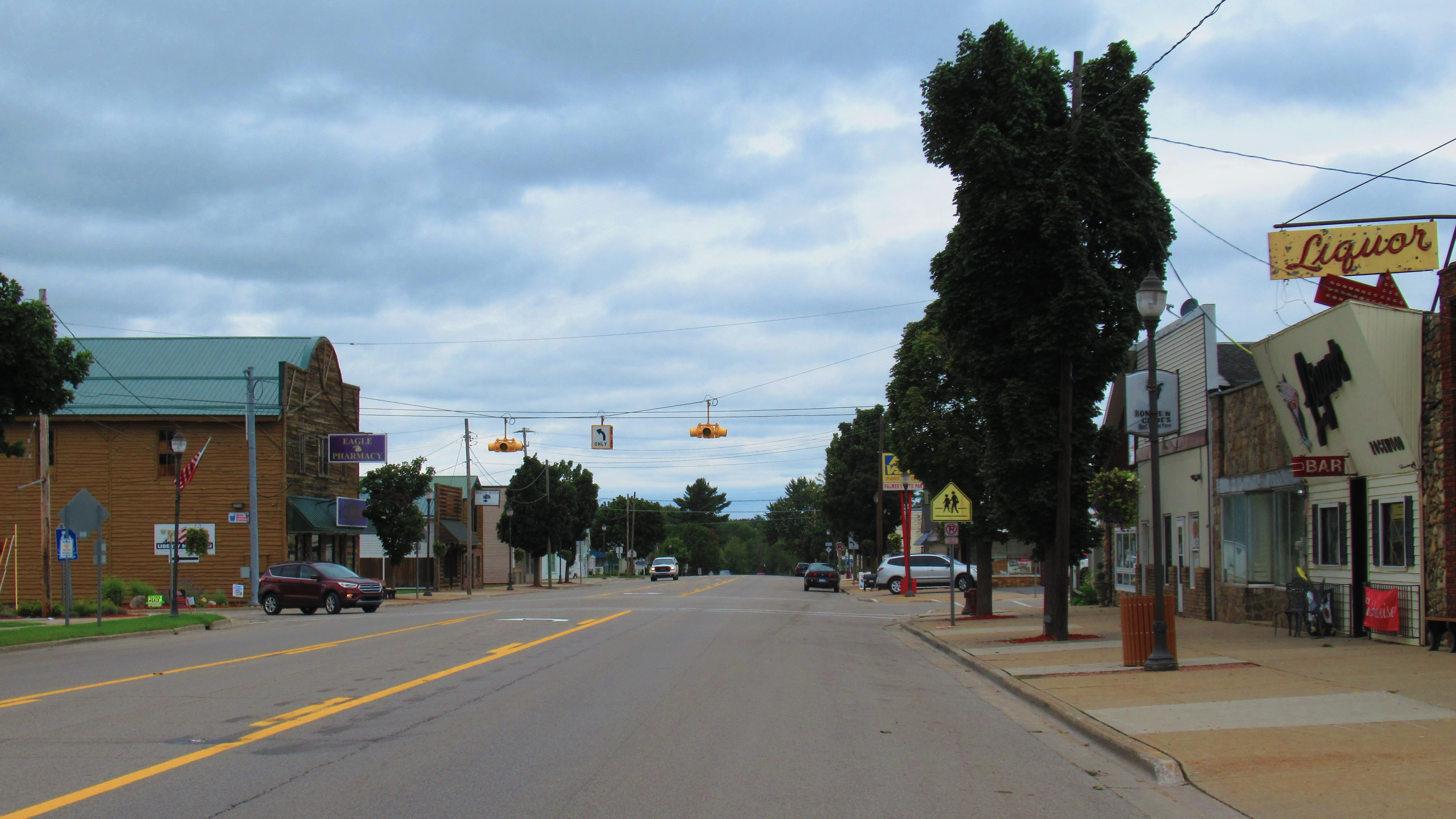
- Looking east along Main Street (M-115)

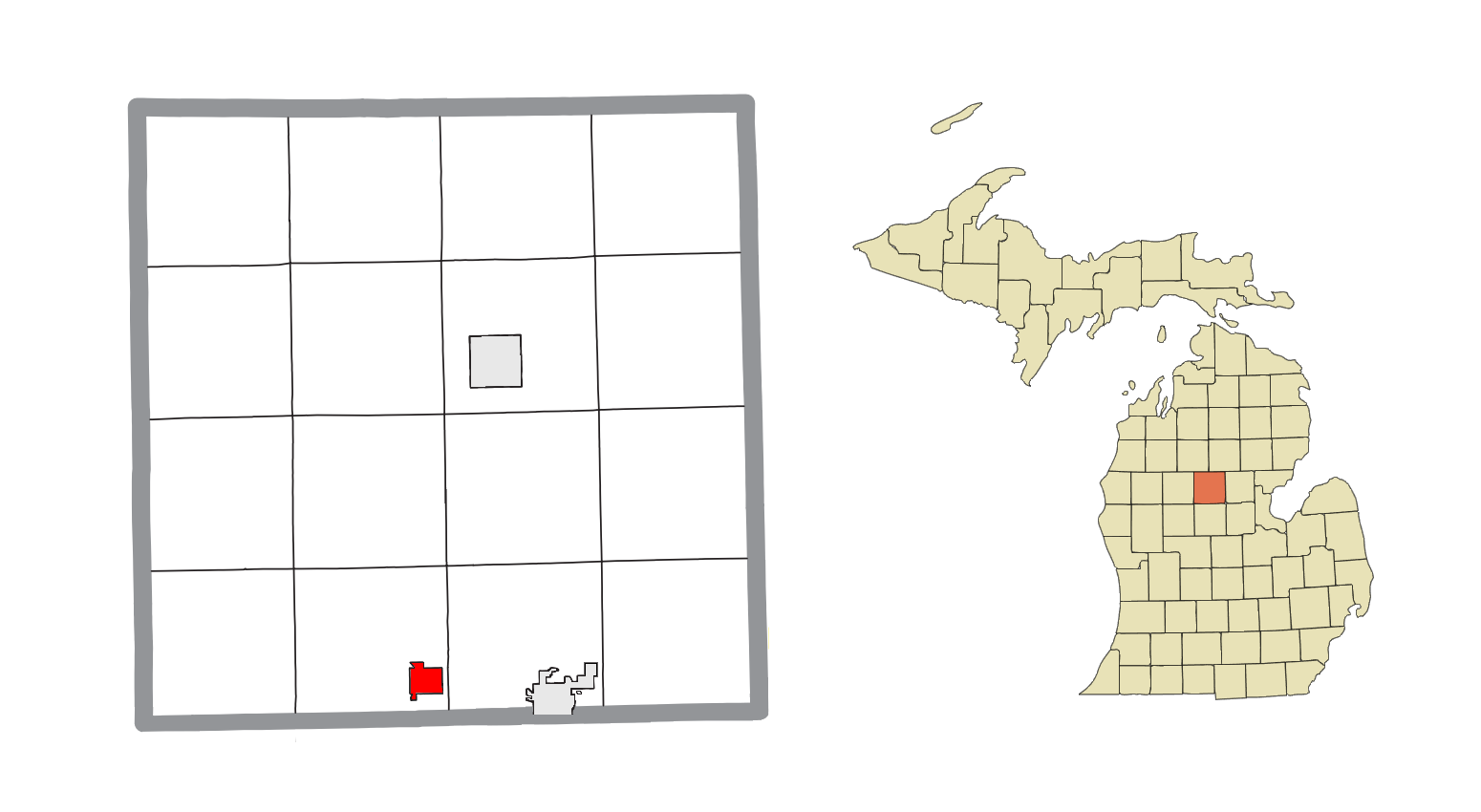
- Location within Clare County

- Location within the state of Michigan Location within the United States
- Coordinates: 43°50′08″N 84°52′04″W
- Country: United States
- State: Michigan
- County: Clare
- Township: Surrey
- Settled: 1870
- Incorporated: 1879

Government
  - Type: Village council
  - President: Tracey Jackson
  - Clerk: Ross Wilson

Area
  - Total: 1.41 sq mi (3.65 km^{2})
  - Land: 1.37 sq mi (3.55 km^{2})
  - Water: 0.039 sq mi (0.10 km^{2})
- Elevation: 928 ft (283 m)

Population (2020)
  - Total: 880
  - Density: 644.3/sq mi (248.77/km^{2})
- Time zone: UTC-5 (Eastern (EST))
  - Summer (DST): UTC-4 (EDT)
- ZIP code(s): 48622
- Area code: 989
- FIPS code: 26-27500
- GNIS feature ID: 0625851
- Website: villageoffarwellmi.gov

Farwell is a village in Clare County in the U.S. state of Michigan. The population was 880 at the 2020 census. The village is located within Surrey Township about 4.0 miles (6.4 km) west of the city of Clare.

== Geography ==
According to the U.S. Census Bureau, the village has a total area of 1.41 square miles (3.65 km^{2}), of which 1.37 square miles (3.55 km^{2}) is land and 0.04 square miles (0.10 km^{2}) (2.84) is water.

The south branch of the Tobacco River flows through the village and contains the Mill Pond reservoir.

=== Major highways ===
- M-115 (Main Street) runs west–east through the center of the village.

== History ==
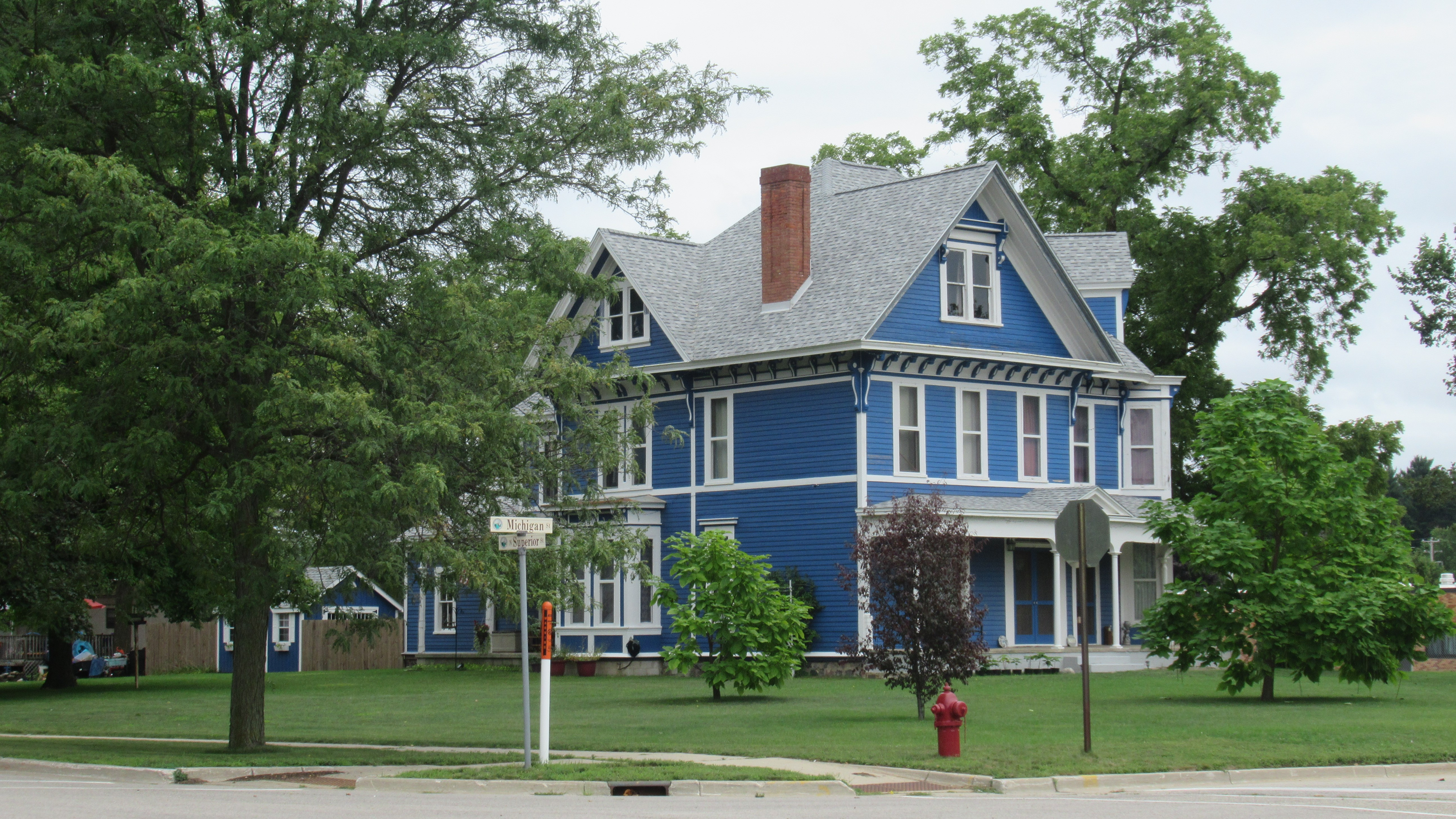
The George and Martha Hitchcock House was built in 1885. It is listed on the National Register of Historic Places and is also a Michigan State Historic Site.

Farwell was founded in 1870 by Edmund Hall, John Van Riper, and George Hitchcock. The Farwell post office opened on January 20, 1871, with George Hitchcock serving as the first postmaster. It was informally platted in 1871 and officially platted the following year by Josiah Littlefield of Ann Arbor. The Flint and Pere Marquette Railroad had plans of expanding into the area on a new route connecting Saginaw to Ludington, which was completed by the end of the decade. The new community was named after New York native Samuel Farwell, who had an interest in the railroad and was a construction contractor. In 1871, Farwell became the first county seat of Clare County but lost the seat of government to Harrison in 1879 after the Farwell courthouse burned down two years earlier. Farwell incorporated as a village in 1879.

In 1982, the Rock Road massacre occurred to the west of Farwell in Garfield Township. Due to its proximity to the village, it became known as the "Farwell Murders" and brought national attention to the area. In 2021, a woman named Judy Boyer, shot and killed 4 people in the same county. It became one of the worst murders the town had seen in decades. She pled guilty to the murders and was sentenced to life in prison without the possibility of parole.

== Demographics ==
Historical population
Census	Pop.	Note	%±
1880	521		—
1890	584		12.1%
1900	535		−8.4%
1910	522		−2.4%
1920	449		−14.0%
1930	422		−6.0%
1940	538		27.5%
1950	694		29.0%
1960	737		6.2%
1970	777		5.4%
1980	804		3.5%
1990	851		5.8%
2000	855		0.5%
2010	871		1.9%
2020	880		1.0%
U.S. Decennial Census

=== 2010 census ===
As of the census of 2010, there were 871 people, 373 households, and 229 families residing in the village. The population density was 645.2 inhabitants per square mile (249.1/km^{2}). There were 411 housing units at an average density of 304.4 per square mile (117.5/km^{2}). The racial makeup of the village was 97.8% White, 0.6% African American, 0.7% Native American, 0.1% Asian, 0.1% Pacific Islander, 0.1% from other races, and 0.6% from two or more races. Hispanic or Latino of any race were 1.8% of the population.

There were 373 households, of which 28.2% had children under the age of 18 living with them, 41.3% were married couples living together, 15.3% had a female householder with no husband present, 4.8% had a male householder with no wife present, and 38.6% were non-families. 33.0% of all households were made up of individuals, and 16.4% had someone living alone who was 65 years of age or older. The average household size was 2.30 and the average family size was 2.85.

The median age in the village was 40.4 years. 22% of residents were under the age of 18; 8.8% were between the ages of 18 and 24; 23.6% were from 25 to 44; 27.2% were from 45 to 64; and 18.4% were 65 years of age or older. The gender makeup of the village was 48.2% male and 51.8% female.

=== 2000 census ===
As of the census of 2000, there were 855 people, 369 households, and 214 families residing in the village. The population density was 620.5 inhabitants per square mile (239.6/km^{2}). There were 404 housing units at an average density of 293.2 per square mile (113.2/km^{2}). The racial makeup of the village was 97.08% White, 0.58% African American, 1.52% Native American, 0.12% Asian, and 0.70% from two or more races. Hispanic or Latino of any race were 0.35% of the population.

There were 369 households out of which 27.9% had children under the age of 18 living with them, 41.2% were married couples living together, 13.6% had a female householder with no husband present, and 42.0% were non-families. 34.7% of all households were made up of individuals and 18.4% had someone living alone who was 65 years of age or older. The average household size was 2.28 and the average family size was 2.94.

In the village the population was spread out with 24.6% under the age of 18, 7.6% from 18 to 24, 27.7% from 25 to 44, 22.7% from 45 to 64, and 17.4% who were 65 years of age or older. The median age was 40 years. For every 100 females there were 83.1 males. For every 100 females age 18 and over, there were 75.3 males.

The median income for a household in the village was $24,583, and the median income for a family was $32,917. Males had a median income of $29,063 versus $20,329 for females. The per capita income for the village was $19,870. About 7.2% of families and 13.3% of the population were below the poverty line, including 13.5% of those under age 18 and 9.9% of those age 65 or over.

== Education ==
Farwell is served by its own school district, Farwell Area Schools, which is centralized in the village and also serves several adjacent townships in both Clare and Isabella County.

== Images ==
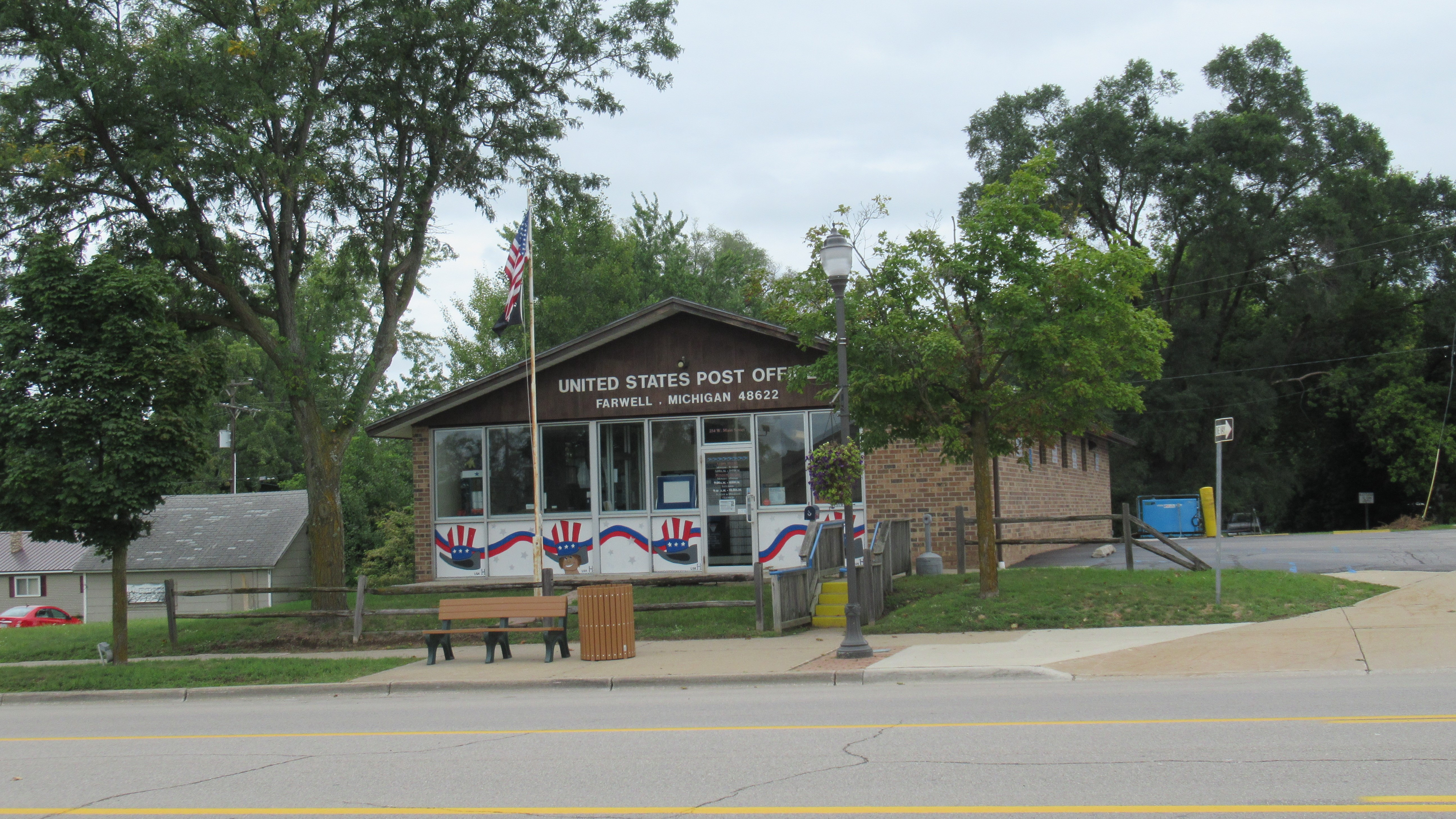
U.S. Post Office in Farwell

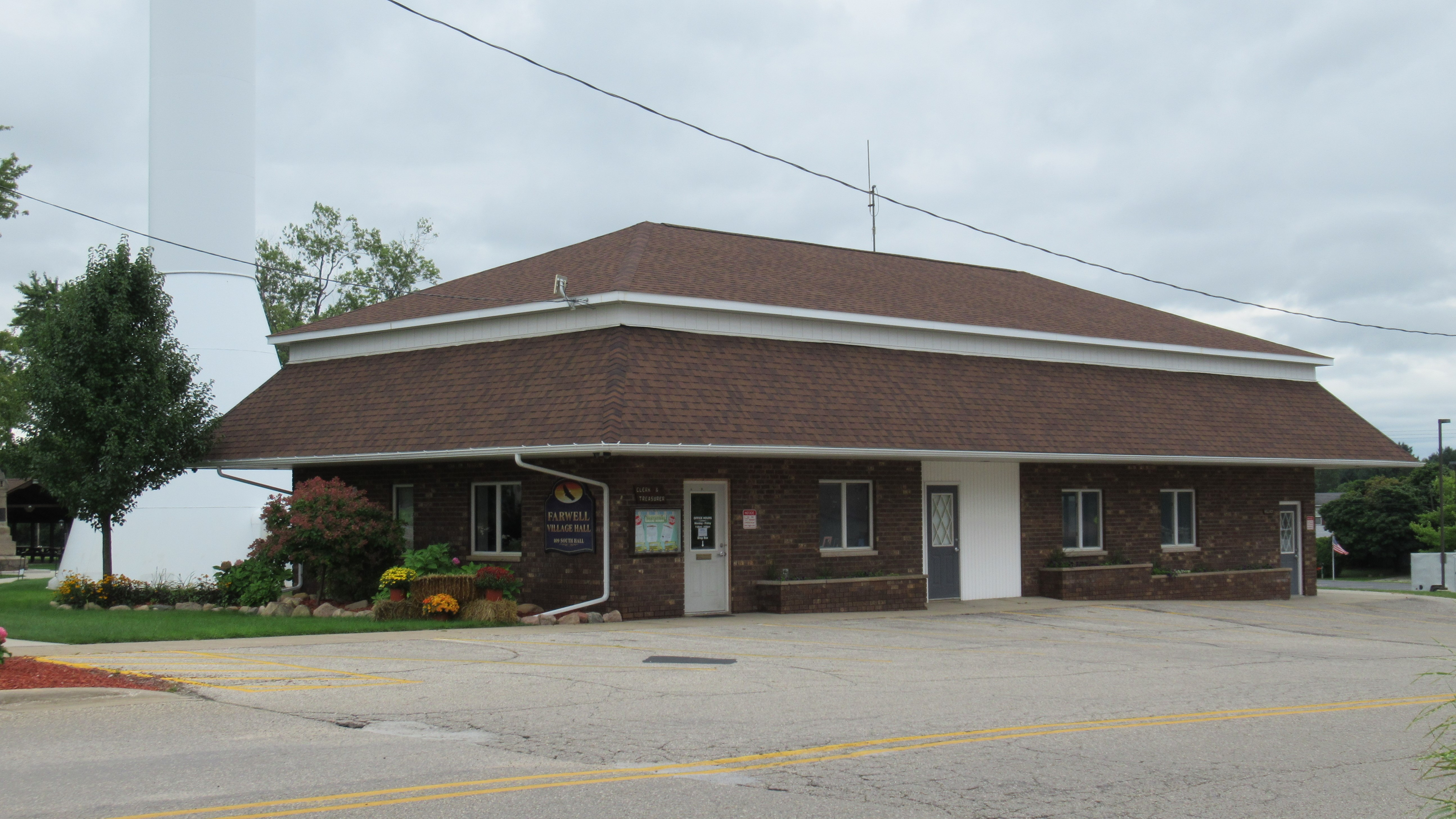
Farwell Village Hall

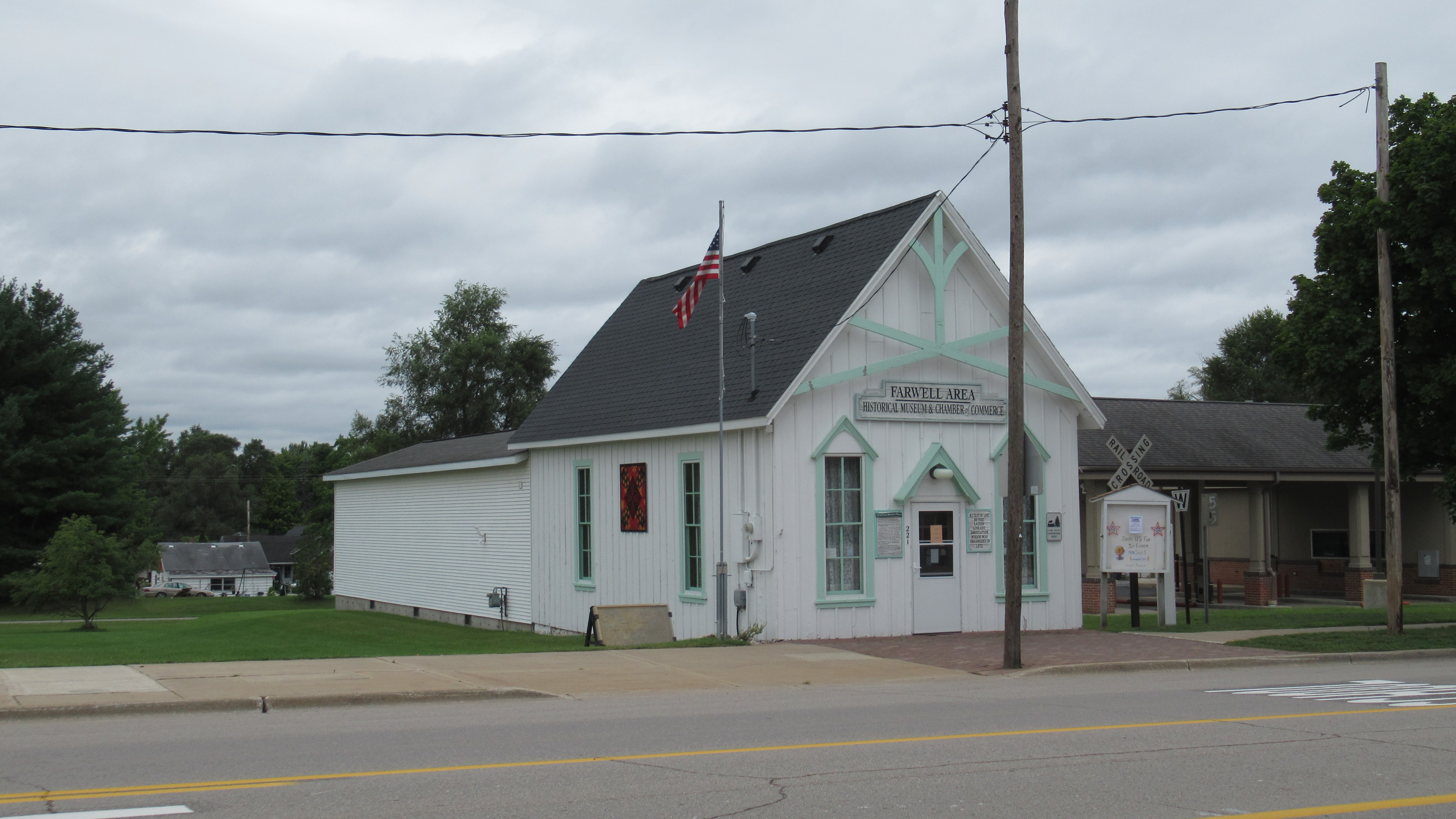
Ladies' Library Association of Farwell

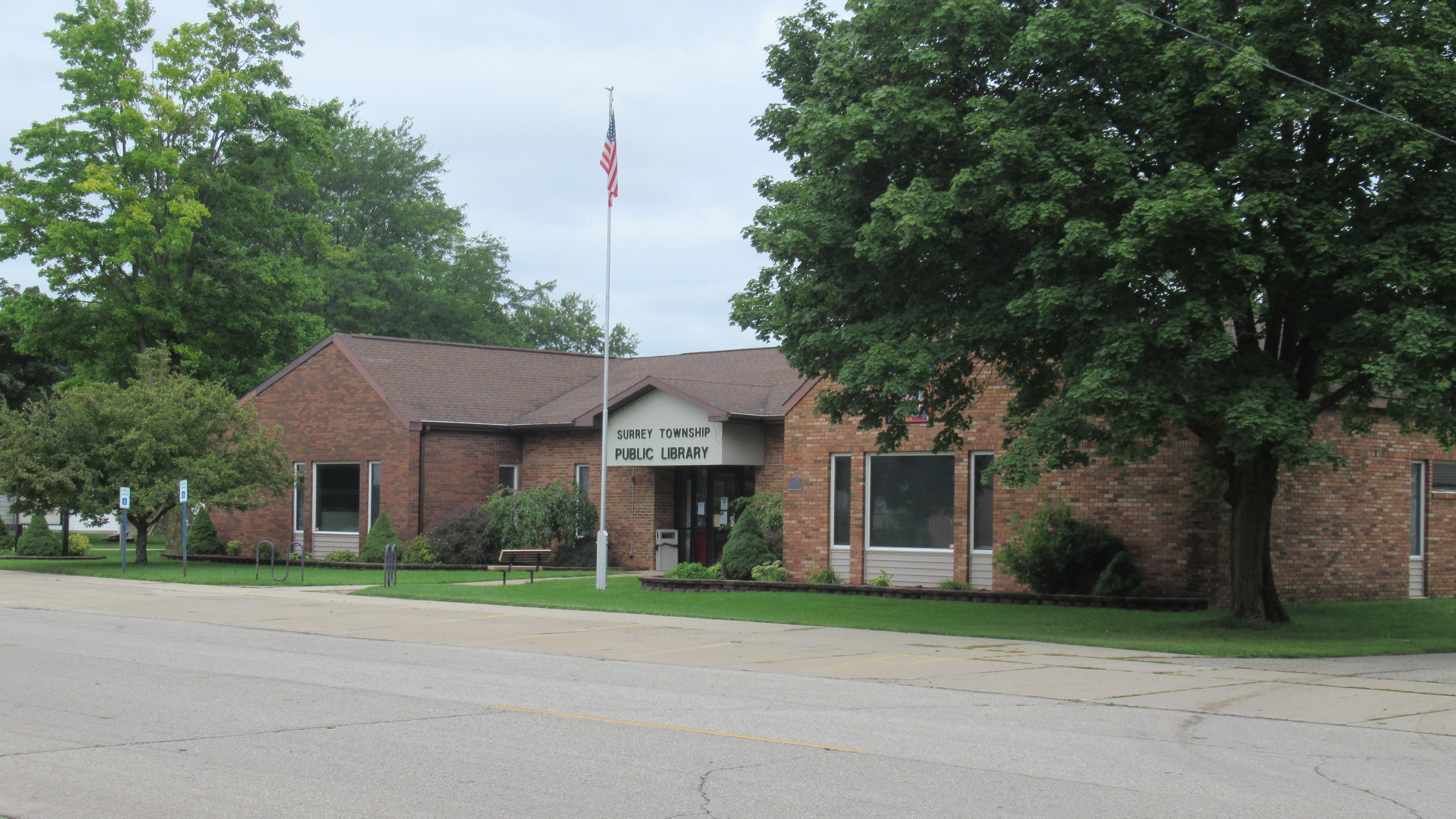
Farwell–Surrey Township Public Library
