= Business routes of U.S. Route 127 in Michigan =

Routes of a highway in Michigan

Business US Highway 127
- Business routes of US 127 highlighted

Location
- Country: United States
- State: Michigan

Highway system
- United States Numbered Highway System; List; Special; Divided; Michigan State Trunkline Highway System; Interstate; US; State; Byways
← US 127	→ M-129

There have been 10 business routes of US Highway 127 in the state of Michigan. The business routes are all sections of state trunkline highway that run through the central business districts of their respective towns connecting them to the mainline highway outside of those downtown areas. These various business routes were formerly part of the routing of US Highway 127 (US 127) or its predecessor in Central Michigan, US 27, before the construction of highway bypasses. The southern two, in Jackson and Mason were previously parts of US 127, while seven of the northern eight (Lansing, St. Johns, Ithaca, St. Louis, Mount Pleasant, Clare and Harrison) were originally part of US 27, a highway which was replaced on its northern end by US 127 in 2002. The business loop through Alma was once numbered US 27A.

In the late 1920s, US 27 was shifted to run through St. Louis instead of Alma, and the former route was renumbered US 27A. US 127 was realigned near Mason in the mid-1940s, and a business loop was created out of the former routing there. A similar bypass of Jackson in the late 1950s also spawned a business loop. In the early 1960s, a new expressway (later freeway) for US 27 through Central Michigan led to the creation of several business loops. Other bypasses opened in the 1980s and 1990s and created the last two business loops. The 2002 extension of US 127 to replace US 27 also led to the redesignation of business loops to their current monikers.

== Jackson ==
Business US Highway 127
- Location: Jackson
- Length: 6.443 mi (10.369 km)
- Existed: c. 1959–present

Business US Highway 127 (Bus. US 127) is a business loop of US 127 through Jackson that is wholly concurrent with M-50. Its southern end is at an interchange in a rural section of Summit Township. From exit 34 on US 127, the business loop runs north and northwesterly, crossing the Grand River. North of the river, the roadway is bounded by businesses as it runs along Cooper Street through residential areas on the southeastern side of Jackson. In the downtown area, Bus. US 127/M-50 merges with Business Loop Interstate 94 (BL I-94) and splits to follow a one-way pairing of streets that form a loop through downtown. Northbound traffic continues along the eastern side of this loop on Cooper Street and crosses the Grand River again. At the intersection with Michigan Avenue, BL I-94/Bus. US 127/M-50 turns westward onto Louis Glick Highway around the northern side of downtown. The business loop crosses the Grand River a third and final time along Louis Glick. On the western side of downtown, the business loop angles southwesterly as Louis Glick Highway merges into Michigan Avenue. (At the same time, the southern half of the one-way loop, Washington Street, also splits from Michigan Avenue.) BL I-94/Bus. US 127/M-50 follows Michigan Avenue westward through residential neighborhoods to an intersection with West Avenue, where Bus. US 127/M-50 turns northward, separating from BL I-94 (Michigan Avenue). As the business loop approaches its parent highway, it transitions into a commercial area. The northern terminus of Bus. US 127 is at the same interchange northwest of Jackson in Blackman Township where the US 127 and I-94 freeways merge.

Jackson was first bypassed on its eastern side around 1959 with a new US 127 freeway. At that time, the former routing of US 127 through downtown was redesignated Bus. US 127. In 1964, several changes were made to the business routes in downtown Jackson. Southbound Bus. US 127 traffic was shifted off Michigan Avenue along Blackstone Street to Washington Avenue, and from there it ran along Washington to Francis Street and back to Michigan Avenue. The northbound traffic was shifted north at Mechanic Street to Pearl Street, continuing until turning south at Blackstone back to Michigan Avenue. The eastern end was updated further in 1968 to use Louis Glick Highway to connect to the northern half of the loop around downtown to Michigan Avenue. A set of connector streets on the western side of the downtown loop opened in November 1969 to streamline the flow of traffic further resulting in the last changes to the BL I-94 routing in Jackson. Southbound traffic was redirected to the connector on Michigan Avenue just east of Third Street. This connector curved south then east to Washington Avenue near First Street. Louis Glick Highway was extended west from Blackstone curving south to merge into Michigan.

Major intersections
The entire highway is in Jackson County.

Location	mi	km	Destinations	Notes
Summit Township	0.000	0.000	US 127 M-50 east – Monroe	Southern end of M-50 concurrency; exit 34 on US 127
Jackson	3.315– 3.480	5.335– 5.601	BL I-94 east (Michigan Avenue) M-106 north (Cooper Street)	Eastern end of BL I-94 concurrency; southern terminus of M-106
Jackson	4.697	7.559	BL I-94 west (Michigan Avenue)	Western end of BL I-94 concurrency
Blackman Township	6.443	10.369	I-94 / US 127 south US 127 north / M-50 north – Lansing, Charlotte	Northern end of M-50 concurrency; exit 138 on I-94 and exit 43 on US 127; roadway continues northward as US 127/M-50 freeway
1.000 mi = 1.609 km; 1.000 km = 0.621 mi: Concurrency terminus

== Mason ==
Business US Highway 127
- Location: Mason
- Length: 2.369 mi (3.813 km)
- Existed: c. 1946–1964

Business US Highway 127 (Bus. US 127) was a business loop that ran through downtown Mason. It started at an intersection on the southern edge of the city where US 127 split from Hull Road to bypass downtown Mason to the west. From there, the business loop ran northward along Hull Road, becoming Jefferson Street. At the intersection with M-36 (Ash Street), Bus. US 127 turned westward and ran concurrently with M-36. After four blocks and a crossing of the Sycamore Creek, Bus. US 127/M-36 turned northward on Cedar Street to Columbia Avenue and then turned westward along Columbia to an intersection with US 127 west of downtown.

The state bypassed Mason around 1946, building a new highway to the west of downtown, and the former route of US 127 through downtown was redesignated Bus. US 127. This business loop existed until 1964. At that time, the bypass around Mason was upgraded to a full freeway with an interchange at Cedar Street northwest of downtown. Two segments of highway were turned over to local control at this time: the southern half of Bus. US 127 along Hull Road and Jefferson Street as well as the section of Bus. US 127/M-36 along Columbia Avenue. M-36 was extended northward along Cedar Street to the new interchange, and the Bus. US 127 designation was decommissioned.

Major intersections
The entire highway was in Mason, Ingham County.

mi	km	Destinations	Notes
0.000	0.000	US 127 – Jackson, Lansing	
1.292	2.079	M-36 east – Pinckney	Eastern end of M-36 concurrency
2.369	3.813	US 127 – Jackson, Lansing M-36 east	Western end of M-36 concurrency; western terminus of M-36
1.000 mi = 1.609 km; 1.000 km = 0.621 mi: Concurrency terminus

== Lansing ==
Business US Highway 127
- Location: Lansing
- Length: 4.725 mi (7.604 km)
- Existed: 2002–present
- History: Never signed as Bus. US 127

Business US Highway 127 (Bus. US 127) is a business route in Lansing that is unsigned. The trunkline starts at an intersection with Business Loop Interstate 96 (BL I-96) at the corner of Cedar and North streets in the northern part of the city. Marked as Old US 27 on maps, the business route follows Cedar Street northeasterly and transitions onto East Street. The highway runs through residential areas on the north side of Lansing. Along the route of Bus. US 127, the highway is immediately bounded by some commercial businesses. At Sheridan Road, the highway crosses from Ingham County into Clinton County and continues as a road named Old US 27. Bus. US 127 continues through suburban southern Clinton County, still bordered by businesses and residential neighborhoods, northward to an interchange with I-69 in DeWitt Township.

In 1984, part of the northern freeway bypass of Lansing opened as I-69. At that time, US 27 was rerouted to follow the new freeway. The former routing of US 27 through downtown Lansing was redesignated Bus. US 27 as a business loop along Lansing Road, I-496 and BL I-96 at this time. Eight years later, the last section of I-69 was completed in Michigan. Afterwards, Bus. US 27 was truncated to the interchange between BL I-96/Capitol Loop and I-496, and the state reconfigured it into a business spur into downtown Lansing from the north.

In 1999, MDOT petitioned the American Association of State Highway and Transportation Officials to decommission the US 27 designation in the state; the change was approved on April 16, 1999. The state waited until 2002 to make the change. After the change was implemented, Bus. US 27 was renumbered to Bus. US 127 as with all of the other similar business routes in the state. However, unlike the other new Bus. US 127s, this one had no connection to US 127, its new parent highway. MDOT has retained the business route as an unsigned trunkline designation ever since.

Major intersections

County	Location	mi	km	Destinations	Notes
Ingham	Lansing	0.000	0.000	BL I-96 (Cedar Street, North Street)	
Clinton	DeWitt Township	4.700– 4.725	7.564– 7.604	I-69 – Fort Wayne, Flint; Old US 27 north – St. Johns	Exit 87 on I-69
1.000 mi = 1.609 km; 1.000 km = 0.621 mi

== St. Johns ==
Business US Highway 127
- Location: St. Johns
- Length: 8.808 mi (14.175 km)
- Existed: 2002–present

Business US Highway 127 (Bus. US 127) starts at the Price Road interchange along US 127 south of St. Johns. From here, Bus. US 127 follows Price Road to the former US 27 and turns north along South Old US 27. In the city of St Johns, it is known as Whittemore Street and intersects M-21 (State Street). Bus. US 127 continues north on North Old US 27 to its northern terminus. The northern terminus of Bus. US 127 nearly coincides with the northern end of the existing US 127 freeway in Clinton County. Approximately one-half mile (0.8 km) north of the Bus. US 127 interchange north of St. Johns, the US 127 freeway merges back onto its former alignment to proceed northerly into Gratiot County.

The St. Johns Bypass on US 27 opened on August 31, 1998, and the former route of the highway through downtown was redesignated Bus. US 27 afterward. In 1999, MDOT petitioned AASHTO to decommission the US 27 designation in the state; the change was approved on April 16, 1999. The state waited until 2002 to make the change. After the change was implemented, Bus. US 27 was renumbered to Bus. US 127 as with all of the other similar business routes in the state to reflect the new parent highway designation.

Major intersections
The entire highway is in Clinton County.

Location	mi	km	Destinations	Notes
Olive Township	0.000	0.000	US 127 – Clare, Lansing	
St. Johns	7.419	11.940	M-21 (State Street) – Ionia, Flint	
Bingham Township	8.808	14.175	US 127 – Clare, Lansing	
1.000 mi = 1.609 km; 1.000 km = 0.621 mi

== Ithaca ==
Business US Highway 127
- Location: Ithaca
- Length: 3.745 mi (6.027 km)
- Existed: 2002–present

Business US Highway 127 (Bus. US 127) is a business loop that runs from an interchange on US 127 on the southern Ithaca city limits through downtown and back to the freeway north of the city. The southern end is at exit 117 on US 127, and from there, the business loop runs westward along Center Street through a cluster of businesses adjacent to the freeway interchange. Further west, Bus. US 127 passes through residential neighborhoods to enter downtown Ithaca. At Main Street, the business loop turns northward one block to Emerson, then turns westward one block along Emerson to Pine River Street, bypassing downtown Ithaca. From there, Bus. US 127 turns northward along the former route of US 27 through town. North of downtown, the highway passes through another residential area before exiting Ithaca. North of town, the business loop passes a golf course before turning eastward a short distance along Polk Road to connect to the freeway.

An expressway through Gratiot County opened in late 1961, and US 27 was rerouted to follow it, bypassing Ithaca to the east. The former route of US 27 along Center and Pine River streets in Ithaca was designated Bus. US 27 at this time. On April 26, 1973, the state transferred control over one block of Center Street west of Main Street and one block of Pine River Street south of Emerson Street. At the same time, the city transferred control of one block each of Main and Emerson streets. In 1999, MDOT petitioned AASHTO to decommission the US 27 designation in the state; the change was approved on April 16, 1999. The state waited until 2002 to make the change. After the change was implemented, Bus. US 27 was renumbered to Bus. US 127 as with all of the other similar business routes in the state to reflect the new parent highway designation.

Major intersections
The entire highway is in Gratiot County.

Location	mi	km	Destinations	Notes
Ithaca–North Star Township line	0.000	0.000	US 127 – Clare, Lansing	Exit 117 on US 127
Emerson Township	3.745	6.027	US 127 – Clare, Lansing	Exit 119 on US 127
1.000 mi = 1.609 km; 1.000 km = 0.621 mi

== Alma ==
Business US Highway 127
- Location: Alma
- Length: 5.631 mi (9.062 km)
- Existed: 2002–present

Business US Highway 127 (Bus. US 127) is a business loop through Alma. The highway starts at a partial interchange for exit 123 on US 127 in a rural area east of Alma. There are a few businesses adjacent to the interchange and an intersection with State Road, which provides access to another partial interchange with US 127 as well as the Bus. US 127 for St. Louis. Continuing westward along Lincoln Road, the landscape along the southern leg of Bus. US 127 comprises farm land. Once the highway enters Alma, the street name changes to Superior Street. Bus. US 127 crosses the Pine River and runs through residential neighborhoods on the eastern side of Alma before entering the downtown area. At an intersection with Wright Avenue to the east of the campus of Alma College, Bus. US 127 turns northward. North of downtown, the business loop crosses another residential area before passed the hospital and more commercial properties. In Pine River Township north of the city, Bus. US 127 intersects M-46 (Monroe Road). M-46 connects the Alma business loop to the St. Louis business loop and a partial interchange with US 127, while the Alma business loop continues less than half a mile (0.6 km) to the partial interchange with US 127 that serves as the business loop's northern terminus.

When the state highway system was initially signposted in 1919, the highway running north–south through the Alma area was numbered M-14. In 1926, this highway was renumbered as part of US 27. The new highway designation was supposed to pass through St. Louis instead of Alma, but US 27 initially followed the routing of M-14. By the end of 1929, the mainline of US 27 was shifted to its desired routing through St. Louis, and the former route of it through Alma became US 27A.

An expressway through Gratiot County opened in late 1961, and US 27 was rerouted to follow it, bypassing Alma to the east. The former route of US 27A along Lincoln Road/Superior Street and Wright Avenue/Alger Road) in Alger was designated Bus. US 27 at this time. In 1999, MDOT petitioned AASHTO to decommission the US 27 designation in the state; the change was approved on April 16, 1999. The state waited until 2002 to make the change. After the change was implemented, Bus. US 27 was renumbered to Bus. US 127 as with all of the other similar business routes in the state to reflect the new parent highway designation.

Major intersections
The entire highway is in Gratiot County.

Location	mi	km	Destinations	Notes
Emerson–Bethany township line	0.000	0.000	US 127 south – Lansing; Lincoln Road east	Exit 123 on US 127; southbound entrance to and northbound exit from US 127 only, additional access to US 127 is through State Road
Emerson–Bethany–Arcada–Pine River township quadri-point	0.297	0.478	State Road to US 127 north	State Road north provides access to exit 124 on US 127 and Bus. US 127 in St. Louis
Pine River Township	5.255	8.457	M-46 to US 127 south (Monroe Road) – Howard City, Saginaw, Lansing	M-46 east provides access to exit 127A on US 127
Pine River Township	5.631	9.062	US 127 north – Clare	Exit 127B on US 127; northbound entrance to and southbound exit from US 127 only, additional access to US 127 is through M-46
1.000 mi = 1.609 km; 1.000 km = 0.621 mi: Incomplete access

== St. Louis ==
Business US Highway 127
- Location: St. Louis
- Length: 4.711 mi (7.582 km)
- Existed: 2002–present

Business US Highway 127 (Bus. US 127) is a business loop through St. Louis. The highway starts at an interchange with US 127 south of St. Louis at exit 124. From there, it follows State Road northward through farmland into the southern edge of town. There, Bus. US 127 follows Main Street through residential areas into downtown. At the intersection with M-46 (Washington Street), the business loop turns westerly along the other highway, running concurrently. The combined highway crosses the Pine River and runs through residential areas as it exits the town. As Bus. US 127/M-46 approaches US 127, it passes several businesses. The business loop terminates at exit 127A near the northern terminus of the Bus. US 127 for Alma.

An expressway through Gratiot County opened in late 1961, and US 27 was rerouted to follow it, bypassing St. Louis to the west. The former route of US 27 along State Road/Main Street and M-46 (Washington Street/Monroe Road) in St. Louis was designated Bus. US 27 at this time. In 1999, MDOT petitioned AASHTO to decommission the US 27 designation in the state; the change was approved on April 16, 1999. The state waited until 2002 to make the change. After the change was implemented, Bus. US 27 was renumbered to Bus. US 127 as with all of the other similar business routes in the state to reflect the new parent highway designation.

Major intersections
The entire highway is in Gratiot County.

Location	mi	km	Destinations	Notes
Pine River–Bethany township line	0.00	0.00	US 127 – Clare, Lansing; State Road south	Exit 124 on US 127; also provides access to Bus. US 127 in Alma via State Road
St. Louis	2.009	3.233	M-46 east (Washington Street) – Saginaw; Main Street north	Eastern end of M-46 concurrency
Pine River Township	4.711	7.582	US 127 – Clare, Lansing M-46 west (Monroe Road) – Alma	Western end of M-46 concurrency; exit 127A on US 127;
1.000 mi = 1.609 km; 1.000 km = 0.621 mi: Concurrency terminus

== Mount Pleasant ==
Business US Highway 127
- Location: Mount Pleasant
- Length: 5.688 mi (9.154 km)
- Existed: 2002–present

Business US Highway 127 (Bus. US 127) in Mount Pleasant runs along a former section of US 27 in the city. The business loop starts at a partial interchange with US 127 at exit 139 in Union Township south of town. The exit ramp from the northbound direction of the freeway exits from the left and forms the northbound lanes of the business loop while the southbound lanes of the business loop merge into the southbound direction of the freeway. Bus. US 127 runs to the west as a four-lane divided highway parallel to tracks of the Great Lakes Central Railroad. Near the south end of the city's commercial strip in the township, the two directions of the business loop merge as an undivided highway and follow Mission Street. Mission runs on the eastern edge of the campus of Central Michigan University, including running past Kelly/Shorts Stadium, home field of the Central Michigan Chippewas football team. North of Bellows Street, the blocks to either side of Mission Street takes on a more residential character while the main street continues to be lined with retail and commercial establishments. M-20 merges in from the west at High Street to run concurrently along the business loop. At Pickard Street, M-20 turns east and Bus. US 127 continues through the north end of town. North of Corporate Way in Union Township, the business loop leaves Mission Street and returns to a divided highway, veering northeasterly to connect to exit 144on US 127. This is also a partial interchange as the northbound lanes from the business loop merge into the northbound lanes of the freeway from the left and the southbound lanes of the business loop are formed from the exit ramp off US 127. The total length of Bus. US 127 in the Mount Pleasant area is 5.688 miles (9.154 km).

In early 1961, a divided highway section for US 27 was opened in Gratiot and Isabella counties; this routing connected into the former US 27 alignment south of Mount Pleasant at Mission Street. By the end of 1961, the US 27 freeway through Isabella County was completed and the divided highway was upgraded to full freeway status. With this project completed, the connector between the freeway and Mission Street south of Mount Pleasant and the former routing along Mission in town was rechristened Bus. US 27. A new divided highway connector on the north end of town was built to complete the business route. In 2002, when US 127 replaced US 27 north of Lansing, the Mount Pleasant business loop was given its current moniker to match.

Major intersections
The entire highway is in Isabella County.

Location	mi	km	Destinations	Notes
Union Township	0.000	0.000	US 127 south – Lansing	Southbound entrance to and northbound left exit from US 127 exit 139
Mount Pleasant	3.578	5.758	M-20 west (High Street) – Big Rapids	Southern end of M-20 concurrency
Mount Pleasant	4.587	7.382	M-20 east (Pickard Street) – Midland	Northern end of M-20 concurrency
Union Township	5.688	9.154	US 127 north – Clare	Northbound left entrance to and southbound exit from US 127 exit 144
1.000 mi = 1.609 km; 1.000 km = 0.621 mi: Concurrency terminus; Incomplete access

== Clare ==
Business US Highway 127
- Location: Clare
- Length: 3.374 mi (5.430 km)
- Existed: 2002–present

Business US Highway 127 (Bus. US 127) is a business loop in Clare. The northern half of the route of the highway is shared with Bus. US 10, running concurrently through downtown. The southern end is at a directional interchange with US 127 south of Clare in Isabella County. This interchange provides access to northbound Bus. US 127 from northbound US 127 only, and traffic from the southbound business loop must enter the southbound freeway only. The business loop runs northwesterly away from the freeway to a roundabout intersection with Mission Road. Bus. US 127 turns northward on Mission Road, crossing into Clare County and following McEwan Street through residential areas on the south side of Clare. At the intersection with 5th Street in downtown, Bus. US 10 merges in from the east and M-115 terminates from the west. Bus. US 127/Bus. US 10 passes through a residential area on the north side of the city and crosses the South Branch of the Tobacco River. As the business loop approaches US 127/U.S. Route 10 in Michigan, it follows Clare Avenue past several businesses before terminating at a full interchange with the freeway.

An expressway through Isabella and Clare counties opened in late 1961, and US 27 was rerouted to follow it, bypassing Clare to the east. The former route of US 27 along McEwan Street and Clare Avenue was designated Bus. US 27 at this time. A freeway bypass north of Clare and Farwell opened in 1975, and US 10 was rerouted along the US 27 freeway to connect from the new bypass to the existing freeway east of the city, bypassing both cities. The section of US 10 in downtown Clare was designated Bus. US 10 at this time, running along Bus. US 27 to connect to US 27/US 10 north of downtown. In 1999, MDOT petitioned AASHTO to decommission the US 27 designation in the state; the change was approved on April 16, 1999. The state waited until 2002 to make the change. After the change was implemented, Bus. US 27 was renumbered to Bus. US 127 as with all of the other similar business routes in the state.

Major intersections

County	Location	mi	km	Destinations	Notes
Isabella	Vernon Township	0.000	0.000	US 127 south – Lansing	Southbound exit to and northbound entrance from US 127 exit 156
Clare	Clare	1.658	2.668	Bus. US 10 east (5th Street) – Midland M-115 north (5th Street) – Farwell	Southern end of BUS US 10 concurrency; southern terminus of M-115
Clare	Grant–Sheridan township line	3.374	5.430	US 127 / US 10 – Mackinac Bridge, Lansing, Midland Bus. US 10 ends Clare Avenue north	Common terminus of Bus. US 127 and BUS US 10 at exit 160 on US 127/US 10
1.000 mi = 1.609 km; 1.000 km = 0.621 mi: Concurrency terminus; Incomplete access

== Harrison ==
Business US Highway 127
- Location: Harrison
- Length: 6.903 mi (11.109 km)
- Existed: 2002–present

Business US Highway 127 (Bus. US 127) is a business loop running through downtown Harrison. The southern end starts at exit 170 on US 127 and runs concurrently northwesterly and northward along M-61 through rural woodland away from the freeway. The business loop passes through the unincorporated community of Allendale as Park Street and turns northwesterly near the southern end of Budd Lake. Now named 1st Street, Bus. US 127/M-61 enters Harrison and turns northward through residential areas into downtown. At the intersection with Main Street, M-61 separates to the west, and the business loop continues northwesterly parallel to the shore of Budd Lake. Bus. US 127 turns northward and exits Harrison hear the Clare County Fairgrounds. North of town, the business loop runs through the unincorporated community of Ash Acres in Hayes Township before passing the Clare County Airport. Bus. US 127 turns northeasterly through woodland north of the airport and terminates at exit 176 on US 127.

An expressway through Clare County opened in late 1961, and US 27 was rerouted to follow it, bypassing Harrison to the east. The former route of US 27 along M-61 and 1st Street/Clare Avenue in Harrison was designated Bus. US 27 at this time. In 1999, MDOT petitioned AASHTO to decommission the US 27 designation in the state; the change was approved on April 16, 1999. The state waited until 2002 to make the change. After the change was implemented, Bus. US 27 was renumbered to Bus. US 127 as with all of the other similar business routes in the state to reflect the new parent highway designation.

Major intersections
The entire highway is in Clare County.

Location	mi	km	Destinations	Notes
Hayes Township	0.000	0.000	US 127 – Clare, Mackinac Bridge M-61 east (Clare Avenue) – Gladwin	Southern end of M-61 concurrency; exit 170 on US 127
Harrison	2.689	4.328	M-61 west (Main Street) – Marion	Northern end of M-61 concurrency
Hayes Township	6.903	11.109	US 127 – Clare, Mackinac Bridge; Clare Avenue north	Exit 176 on US 127
1.000 mi = 1.609 km; 1.000 km = 0.621 mi: Concurrency terminus
