= Frost, Michigan =

Frost may refer to the following places in the U.S. state of Michigan:

- Frost, Houghton County, Michigan, in Laird Township
- Frost, Saginaw County, Michigan, in Thomas Township
- Frost Township, Michigan, in Clare County
