= Summerfield Township, Michigan =

Summerfield Township is the name of some places in the U.S. state of Michigan:

- Summerfield Township, Clare County, Michigan
- Summerfield Township, Monroe County, Michigan
