= Allendale, Michigan (disambiguation) =

Allendale, Michigan may refer to:

- Allendale Charter Township, Michigan, a town
  - Allendale, Michigan, a census-designated place within the town
- Allendale, an unincorporated community of Hayes Township, Clare County, Michigan
