= Winterfield Township, Michigan =

- Civil township
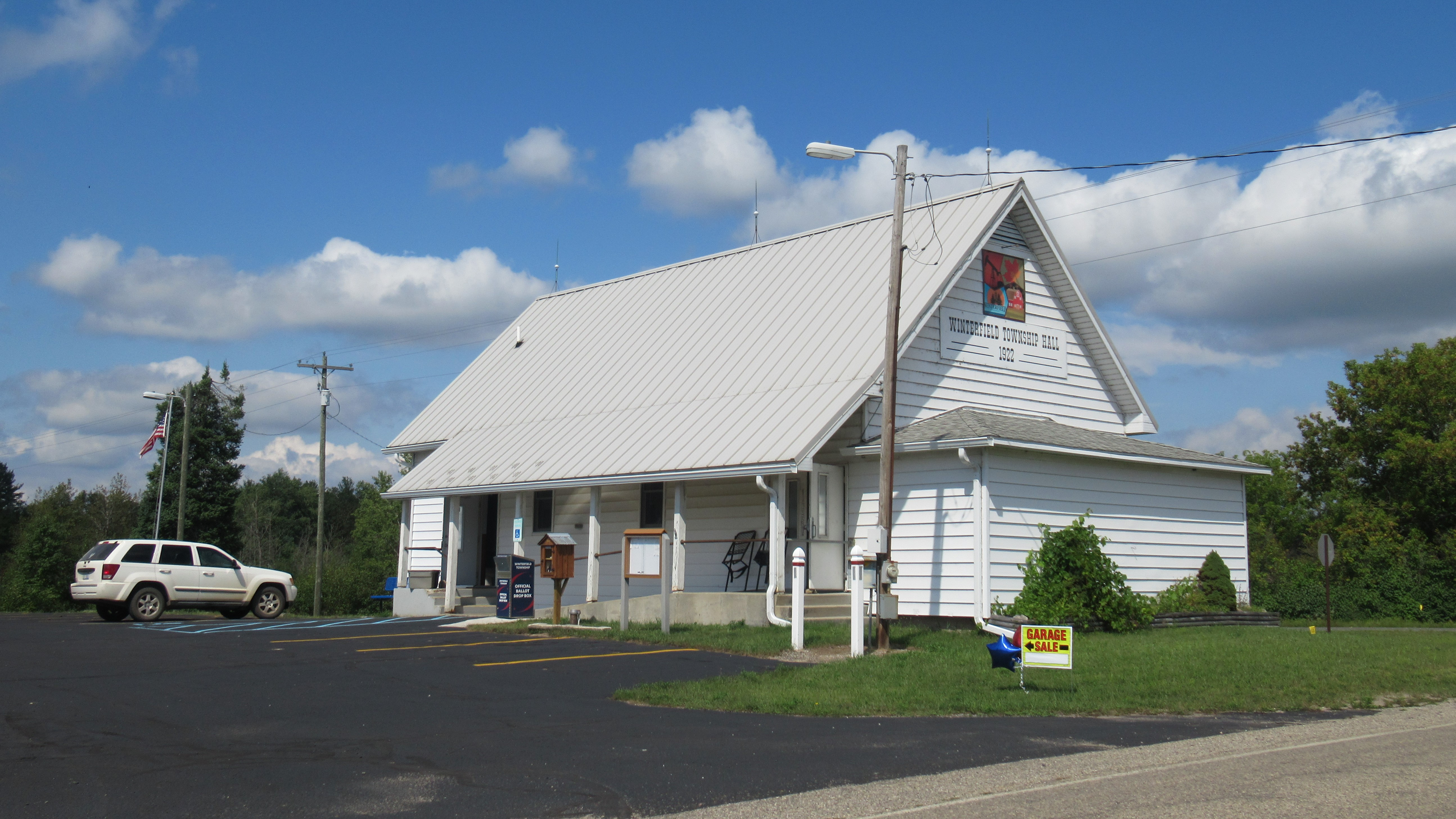
- Winterfield Township Hall

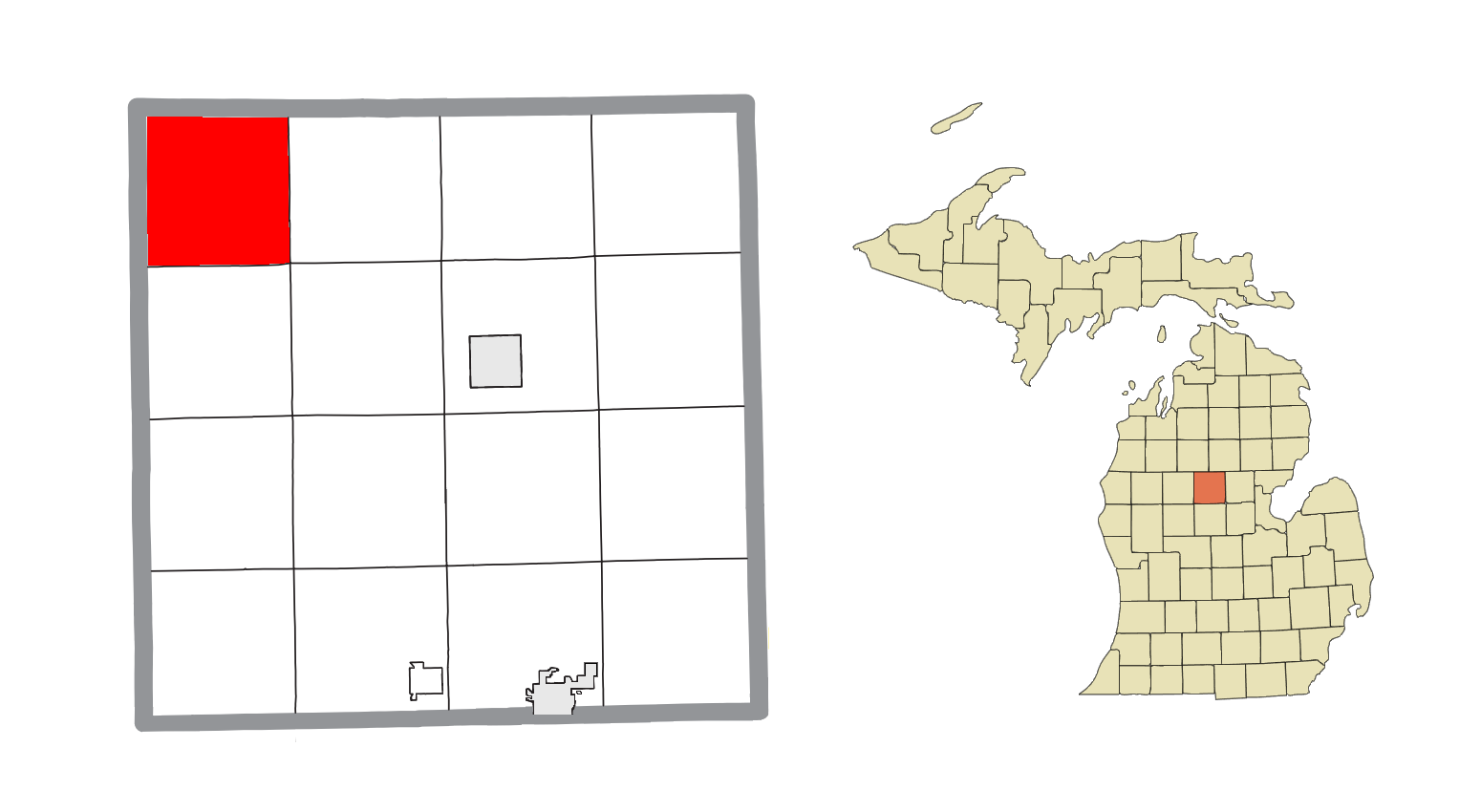
- Location within Clare County

- Location within the state of Michigan Location within the United States
- Coordinates: 44°06′50″N 85°01′52″W
- Country: United States
- State: Michigan
- County: Clare
- Established: 1871

Government
  - Supervisor: Mark Hammar
  - Clerk: Bonnie Blackledge

Area
  - Total: 36.61 sq mi (94.82 km^{2})
  - Land: 36.05 sq mi (93.37 km^{2})
  - Water: 0.56 sq mi (1.45 km^{2})
- Elevation: 1,076 ft (328 m)

Population (2020)
  - Total: 460
  - Density: 12.8/sq mi (4.9/km^{2})
- Time zone: UTC-5 (Eastern (EST))
  - Summer (DST): UTC-4 (EDT)
- ZIP code(s): 49665 (Marion)
- Area code: 989
- FIPS code: 26-87980
- GNIS feature ID: 1627282
- Website: Official website

Winterfield Township is a civil township of Clare County in the U.S. state of Michigan. The population was 460 at the 2020 census.

== Geography ==
According to the U.S. Census Bureau, the township has a total area of 36.61 square miles (94.82 km^{2}), of which 36.05 square miles (93.37 km^{2}) is land and 0.56 square miles (1.45 km^{2}) (1.53%) is water.

The Muskegon River runs through the southeast portion of the township, while the Clam River enters from the north as a tributary to the Muskegon River.

== Demographics ==
As of the census of 2000, there were 483 people, 184 households, and 142 families residing in the township. The population density was 13.2 per square mile (5.1/km^{2}). There were 386 housing units at an average density of 10.6 per square mile (4.1/km^{2}). The racial makeup of the township was 95.86% White, 1.04% Native American, 1.66% from other races, and 1.45% from two or more races. Hispanic or Latino of any race were 1.04% of the population.

There were 184 households, out of which 29.9% had children under the age of 18 living with them, 59.8% were married couples living together, 13.0% had a female householder with no husband present, and 22.3% were non-families. 17.9% of all households were made up of individuals, and 10.3% had someone living alone who was 65 years of age or older. The average household size was 2.63 and the average family size was 2.94.

In the township the population was spread out, with 26.7% under the age of 18, 7.7% from 18 to 24, 21.7% from 25 to 44, 27.7% from 45 to 64, and 16.1% who were 65 years of age or older. The median age was 40 years. For every 100 females, there were 105.5 males. For every 100 females age 18 and over, there were 98.9 males.

The median income for a household in the township was $26,953, and the median income for a family was $30,455. Males had a median income of $32,500 versus $22,813 for females. The per capita income for the township was $14,322. About 18.8% of families and 22.5% of the population were below the poverty line, including 31.0% of those under age 18 and 13.7% of those age 65 or over.

== Education ==
The township is served by three separate public school districts. The majority of the township is served by Marion Public Schools to the west in the village of Marion in Osceola County. The southeast corner of the township is served by Harrison Community Schools to the southeast in the city of Harrison, while a very small northern portion of the township is served by McBain Rural Agricultural Schools to the north in the city of McBain in Missaukee County.
