= Clare Public Schools =

School district in Michigan, United States

Address
- 201 E State Street Clare, Clare County, Michigan, 48617; United States
- Coordinates: 43°49′25″N 84°45′51.8″W

District information
- Type: Public School District
- Motto: "A Great Place to Live and Learn"
- Grades: Pre-Kindergarten-12
- Superintendent: Matthew Forsberg
- School board: Loren Cole - President John Miller - Vice-President Samantha Sharp - Secretary Jennifer Dancer - Treasurer Susan Atwood - Trustee Kelly Luplow - Trustee Jason MacDonald - Trustee
- Schools: 4
- Budget: $22,750,000 2022-2023 expenditures
- NCES District ID: 2609750

Students and staff
- Students: 1,554 (2024-2025)
- Teachers: 92.73 (on an FTE basis) (2024-2025)
- Staff: 201.5 FTE (2024-2025)
- Student–teacher ratio: 16.76 (2024-2025)
- District mascot: Pioneers
- Colors: Green and White

Other information
- Website: clare.k12.mi.us

Clare Public Schools is a public school district in Central Michigan. In Clare County, it serves Clare, Sheridan Township, and parts of the townships of Arthur, Grant, and Hatton. It also serves parts of Vernon Township and Wise Township in Isabella County.

== History ==
The first class graduated from Clare High School in 1887.

A fire destroyed one of Clare's first school buildings on September 26, 1900. It was rebuilt and opened by early 1901. The new building was described in the Clare Sentinel newspaper: "A nine room, red brick building with a high school seating over 100. The woodwork is oak finish, the walls are tinted green with cream ceilings, the halls being tinted with a soft shade of pink. All rooms are equipped with slate blackboards, wired for electric lights, electric bells for the passing of classes, chipped glass in inside doors, fan furnace heat, lavatories in an annex to the basement."

This school also burned. After a May 15, 1921 fire, the brick walls were all that remained. As in the 1900-1901 school year, classes were held in area churches and meeting halls until Clare Public School opened in fall 1922.

The district's schools share a campus north of downtown Clare. Clare Public School, now Clare Middle School, is the oldest building on the campus still standing. J.D. Butterworth of Lansing was the architect.

A bond issue passed in 1957 funded construction of the current high school. The architect was Clark R. Ackley of Lansing. The building opened on September 21, 1959, one week behind schedule. In 1962, voters approved a bond issue to build additions containing ten classrooms and two music rooms at the high school and make fire safety improvements at the elementary school, which was housed in the 1922 building at the time. The wing currently housing Clare Primary School was built in 1973.

== Clare Middle School Murals ==
The Federal Art Project, part of the New Deal-era Works Progress Administration, funded the painting of four murals in Clare Public School's auditorium in 1938. They illustrate the industries of Clare and the studies of Clare's students.

The 2023 bond issue request including demolition of the building due to its obsolescence. Voters denied the bond issue at the time. Although the district would prefer the murals be saved, they are owned by the Federal Government, and funding for their removal and preservation is beyond the district.

== Schools ==
Schools in Clare Public Schools district
School	Address	Notes
Clare Primary School	205 E. Wheaton, Clare	Grades PreK-4. Built 1973.
Clare Middle School	209 E State St., Clare	Grades 5-8. Built 1922.
Clare High School	306 Schoolcrest, Clare	Grades 9-12. Built 1959.
Pioneer High School	670 Ann Arbor Trail, Clare	Grades 9-12. Alternative education

== Notable alumni ==
- Gloria Sickal Gaither—composer of Christian music; member of the Bill Gaither Trio
- Debbie Stabenow—United States Senator from Michigan since 2001.
