= Clare County, Michigan =

County in Michigan, United States

- County
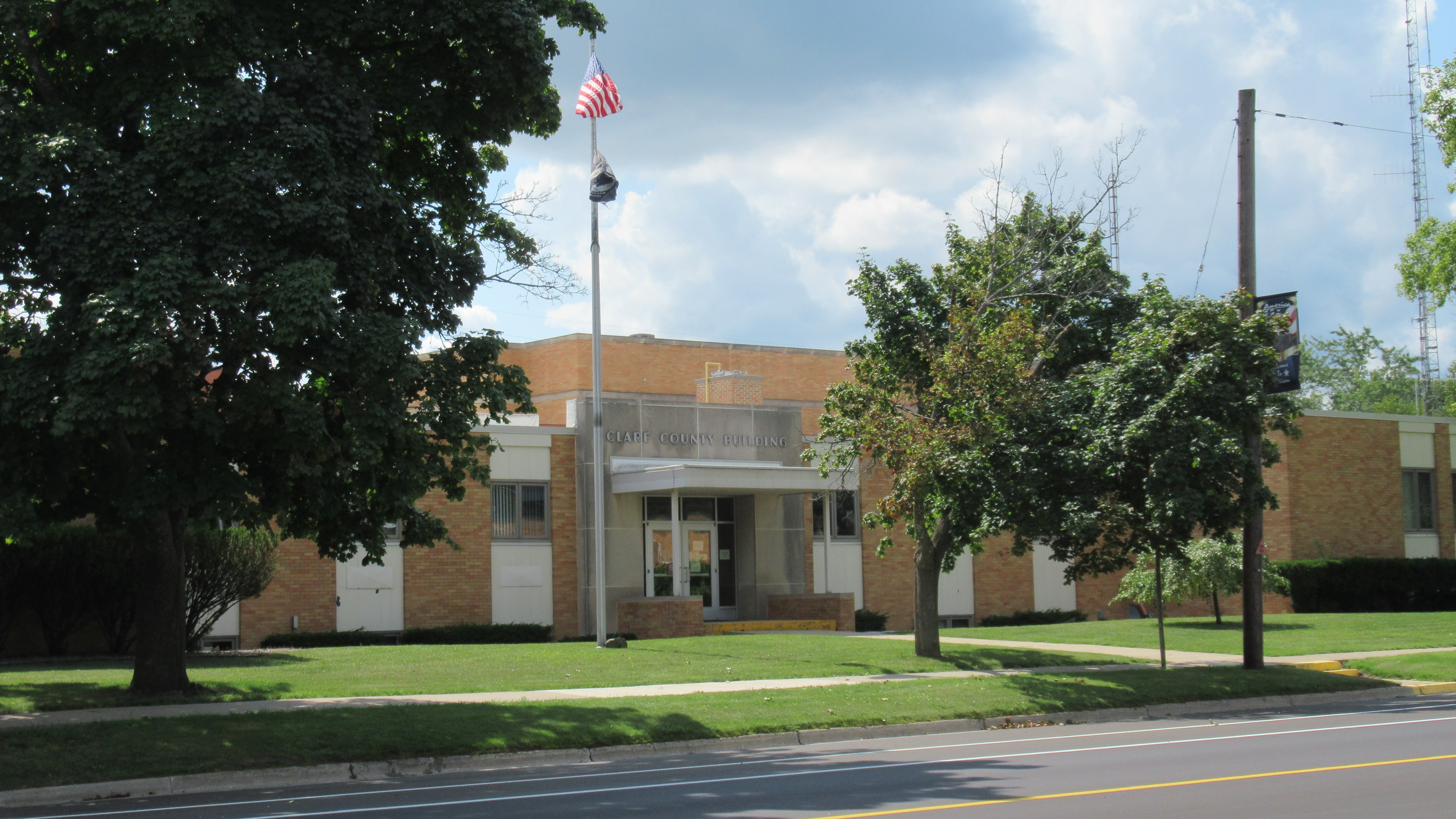
- Clare County District Court in Harrison

- Seal

- Location within the U.S. state of Michigan
- Coordinates: 43°59′N 84°50′W
- Country: United States
- State: Michigan
- Established: 1840
- Organized: 1871
- Named for: County Clare, Ireland
- Seat: Harrison
- Largest city: Clare

Area
  - Total: 575 sq mi (1,490 km^{2})
  - Land: 564 sq mi (1,460 km^{2})
  - Water: 11 sq mi (28 km^{2}) 1.9%

Population (2020)
  - Total: 30,856
  - Estimate (2025): 31,543 ▲
  - Density: 56/sq mi (22/km^{2})
- Time zone: UTC−5 (Eastern)
  - Summer (DST): UTC−4 (EDT)
- Congressional district: 2nd
- Website: clareco.net

Clare County is a county in the U.S. state of Michigan. As of the 2020 Census, the population was 30,856. The county seat is Harrison.

== History ==
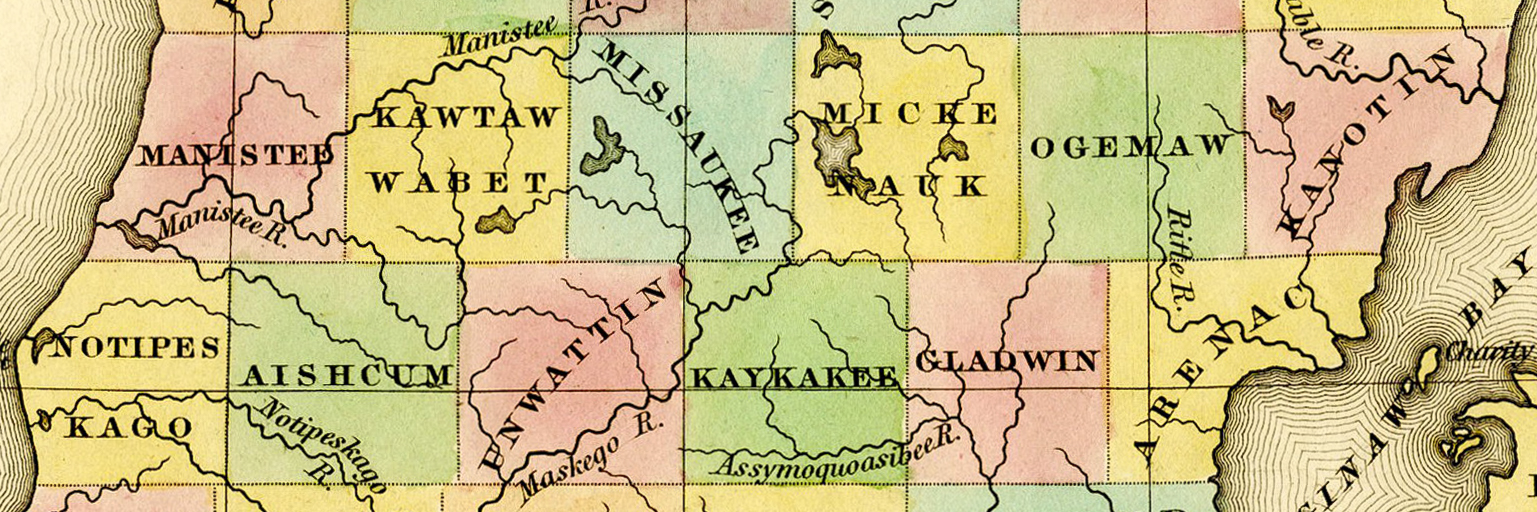
A detail from A New Map of Michigan with its Canals, Roads & Distances (1842) by Henry Schenck Tanner, showing Clare County as Kaykakee, the county's name from 1840 to 1843; several nearby counties are also shown with names that would later be changed

The county was created by the Michigan Legislature from part of Michilimackinac County in 1840, named Kaykakee County after a Sauk Indian Chief, and renamed Clare County in 1843 after County Clare in Ireland. The county was administered by a succession of other Michigan counties prior to the organization of county government in 1871. (Note: For more details on Michigan county names and etymologies, see List of counties in Michigan.) Farwell was the first county seat; in 1877 the county seat was moved to Harrison.

== Geography ==
According to the US Census Bureau, the county has a total area of 575 square miles (1,490 km^{2}), of which 564 square miles (1,460 km^{2}) is land and 11 square miles (28 km^{2}) (1.9%) is water. It is considered to be part of both Northern Michigan and Central Michigan.

=== Features ===
- Au Sable State Forest

=== Major highways ===
- US 10 runs east–west through the bottom of the county. It enters west county line at 3.7 miles (6.0 km) north of SW corner of county. It runs easterly to intersection with US127 at 2.8 miles (4.5 km) north of Clare.
- Bus. US 10 runs through Clare with Bus. US 127 until they meet M-115, where Bus. US 10 runs eastward to US 10.
- US 127 runs north–south through eastern middle of county, passing Harrison and Clare.
- Bus. US 127 runs through Clare with Bus. US 10 until the two meet M-115, where Bus. US 10 turns eastward while Bus. US 127 continues southward to US 127.
- Bus. US 127 runs from US 127 and goes through Harrison. Bus. US 127 intersects M-61, and the two have a concurrency with each other until they both intersect US 127, where Bus. US 127 ends with M-61 continues eastward to Gladwin.
- M-18 runs along east line of county, from the northeast corner for 3.5 miles (5.6 km), then turns east into Gladwin County.
- M-61 runs east–west through middle of county, entering the west line from Osceola County and running east to intersection with US 127 at Harrison.
- M-115 runs southeast and east across bottom of county. It enters the west line from Osceola County at nine miles (14 km) above the southwest corner of county and goes to an intersection with Bus. US 127/Bus. US 10 at Clare.

=== Adjacent counties ===
- Missaukee County – northwest
- Roscommon County – northeast
- Gladwin County – east
- Midland County – southeast
- Isabella County – south
- Mecosta County – southwest
- Osceola County – west

== Demographics ==
Historical population
Census	Pop.	Note	%±
1870	366		—
1880	4,187		1,044.0%
1890	7,558		80.5%
1900	8,360		10.6%
1910	9,240		10.5%
1920	8,250		−10.7%
1930	7,032		−14.8%
1940	9,163		30.3%
1950	10,253		11.9%
1960	11,647		13.6%
1970	16,695		43.3%
1980	23,822		42.7%
1990	24,952		4.7%
2000	31,252		25.2%
2010	30,926		−1.0%
2020	30,856		−0.2%
2025 (est.)	31,543	▲	2.2%
US Decennial Census; 1790-1960 1900-90; 1990-2000 2010 2025

=== Racial and ethnic composition ===
Clare County, Michigan – Racial and ethnic composition Note: the US Census treats Hispanic/Latino as an ethnic category. This table excludes Latinos from the racial categories and assigns them to a separate category. Hispanics/Latinos may be of any race.
Race / Ethnicity (NH = Non-Hispanic)	Pop 1980	Pop 1990	Pop 2000	Pop 2010	Pop 2020	% 1980	% 1990	% 2000	% 2010	% 2020
White alone (NH)	23,543	24,569	30,210	29,612	28,628	98.83%	98.47%	96.67%	95.75%	92.78%
Black or African American alone (NH)	8	39	100	145	140	0.03%	0.16%	0.32%	0.47%	0.45%
Native American or Alaska Native alone (NH)	139	156	214	188	181	0.58%	0.63%	0.68%	0.61%	0.59%
Asian alone (NH)	20	53	78	90	72	0.08%	0.21%	0.25%	0.29%	0.23%
Native Hawaiian or Pacific Islander alone (NH)	x	x	2	8	0	x	x	0.01%	0.03%	0.00%
Other race alone (NH)	16	3	20	13	88	0.07%	0.01%	0.06%	0.04%	0.29%
Mixed race or Multiracial (NH)	x	x	288	406	1,126	x	x	0.92%	1.31%	3.65%
Hispanic or Latino (any race)	96	132	340	464	621	0.40%	0.53%	1.09%	1.50%	2.01%
Total	23,822	24,952	31,252	30,926	30,856	100.00%	100.00%	100.00%	100.00%	100.00%

=== 2020 census ===
As of the 2020 census, the county had a population of 30,856. The median age was 48.0 years. 20.0% of residents were under the age of 18 and 24.2% of residents were 65 years of age or older. For every 100 females there were 100.6 males, and for every 100 females age 18 and over there were 100.2 males age 18 and over.

The racial makeup of the county was 93.6% White, 0.5% Black or African American, 0.7% American Indian and Alaska Native, 0.2% Asian, <0.1% Native Hawaiian and Pacific Islander, 0.7% from some other race, and 4.3% from two or more races. Hispanic or Latino residents of any race comprised 2.0% of the population. 12.3% of residents lived in urban areas, while 87.7% lived in rural areas.

There were 13,279 households in the county, of which 23.3% had children under the age of 18 living in them. Of all households, 45.3% were married-couple households, 21.7% were households with a male householder and no spouse or partner present, and 24.1% were households with a female householder and no spouse or partner present. About 31.8% of all households were made up of individuals and 15.8% had someone living alone who was 65 years of age or older. There were 21,818 housing units, of which 39.1% were vacant. Among occupied housing units, 79.4% were owner-occupied and 20.6% were renter-occupied. The homeowner vacancy rate was 2.8% and the rental vacancy rate was 5.9%.

=== 2010 census ===
As of the 2010 census, Clare County had a population of 30,926, a decrease of 326 people from the 2000 census. In 2010 there were 12,966 households and 8,584 families in the county. The population density was 54.8 per square mile (21.2/km^{2}). There were 23,233 housing units at an average density of 41.2 per square mile (15.9/km^{2}). The racial and ethnic makeup of the county was 95.8% White, 0.5% Black or African American, 0.6% Native American, 0.3% Asian, 1.5% Hispanic or Latino, 0.1% from other races, and 1.3% from two or more races.

There were 12,966 households, out of which 25.3% had children under the age of 18 living with them, 51.0% were husband and wife families, 10.0% had a female householder with no husband present, 33.8% were non-families, and 28.0% were made up of individuals. The average household size was 2.36 and the average family size was 2.83.

The county population contained 20.9% under age of 18, 7.9% from 18 to 24, 20.8% from 25 to 44, 30.4% from 45 to 64, and 19.9% who were 65 years of age or older. The median age was 45 years. For every 100 females there were 99.7 males. For every 100 females age 18 and over, there were 97.9 males.

=== 2010 American Community Survey ===
The 2010 American Community Survey 3-year estimate indicates that the median income for a household in the county was $33,338 and the median income for a family was $40,983. Males had a median income of $24,220 versus $13,587 for females. The per capita income for the county was $18,516. About 2.3% of families and 23.1% of the population were below the poverty line, including 36.8% of those under the age 18 and 8.5% of those age 65 or over.

=== Religion ===
- The Roman Catholic Diocese of Saginaw is the controlling regional body for the Catholic Church.
- The Church of Jesus Christ of Latter-day Saints has one meetinghouse in the county, in Harrison.

== Government ==
Clare County voters tend to vote Republican; they have selected the Republican Party nominee in 72% of national elections (26 of 36).

United States presidential election results for Clare County, Michigan
Year	Republican		Democratic		Third party(ies)	
Year	No.	%	No.	%	No.	%
1884	622	46.21%	685	50.89%	39	2.90%
1888	905	47.99%	912	48.36%	69	3.66%
1892	719	41.90%	811	47.26%	186	10.84%
1896	886	53.09%	723	43.32%	60	3.59%
1900	1,182	63.62%	640	34.45%	36	1.94%
1904	1,453	70.91%	519	25.33%	77	3.76%
1908	1,345	68.14%	567	28.72%	62	3.14%
1912	563	30.99%	435	23.94%	819	45.07%
1916	1,049	54.38%	769	39.87%	111	5.75%
1920	1,762	73.48%	511	21.31%	125	5.21%
1924	1,920	77.67%	358	14.48%	194	7.85%
1928	1,920	82.62%	381	16.39%	23	0.99%
1932	1,474	44.34%	1,741	52.38%	109	3.28%
1936	1,979	53.37%	1,494	40.29%	235	6.34%
1940	3,004	69.86%	1,277	29.70%	19	0.44%
1944	2,636	70.58%	1,078	28.86%	21	0.56%
1948	2,512	66.02%	1,197	31.46%	96	2.52%
1952	3,529	76.22%	1,059	22.87%	42	0.91%
1956	3,721	75.51%	1,194	24.23%	13	0.26%
1960	3,616	70.49%	1,507	29.38%	7	0.14%
1964	2,258	43.45%	2,927	56.32%	12	0.23%
1968	3,315	56.85%	1,909	32.74%	607	10.41%
1972	4,402	62.99%	2,434	34.83%	152	2.18%
1976	4,879	53.46%	4,153	45.51%	94	1.03%
1980	5,719	53.36%	4,164	38.85%	835	7.79%
1984	6,587	63.26%	3,764	36.15%	61	0.59%
1988	5,661	54.18%	4,710	45.08%	77	0.74%
1992	3,916	32.20%	5,346	43.95%	2,901	23.85%
1996	3,742	32.03%	6,311	54.02%	1,630	13.95%
2000	5,937	47.09%	6,287	49.87%	383	3.04%
2004	7,088	49.82%	6,984	49.09%	154	1.08%
2008	6,793	46.51%	7,496	51.32%	316	2.16%
2012	6,988	51.63%	6,338	46.83%	209	1.54%
2016	8,505	63.24%	4,249	31.59%	695	5.17%
2020	10,861	66.65%	5,199	31.91%	235	1.44%
2024	11,772	68.09%	5,273	30.50%	243	1.41%

United States Senate election results for Clare County, Michigan1
Year	Republican		Democratic		Third party(ies)	
Year	No.	%	No.	%	No.	%
2024	11,146	65.59%	5,285	31.10%	562	3.31%

Michigan Gubernatorial election results for Clare County
Year	Republican		Democratic		Third party(ies)	
Year	No.	%	No.	%	No.	%
2022	7,850	59.48%	5,057	38.32%	291	2.20%

The county government operates the jail, maintains rural roads, operates the major local courts, records deeds, mortgages, and vital records, administers public health regulations, and participates with the state in the provision of social services. The county board of commissioners controls the budget and has limited authority to make laws or ordinances. In Michigan, most local government functions— police and fire, building and zoning, tax assessment, street maintenance, etc.—are the responsibility of individual cities and townships.

=== Elected officials ===
- County Commission: Marlene Hausler; Dale Majewski; Jacob Gross; Jeff Haskell; David Hoefling; Jack Kleinhardt; Gabe Ambrozaitis; George Gilmore; Rickie Fancon
- Prosecuting Attorney: Andrew Santini
- Sheriff: John Wilson
- County Clerk/Register of Deeds: Lori Mott
- County Treasurer: Jenny Beemer-Fritzinger
- Drain Commissioner: Bill Faber
- County Surveyor: Paul A. Lapham
- Road Commission: Dave Coker; Tim Haskin; Karen Hulliberger; Bill Simpson; Max Schunk
- State Representative: Mike Hoadley (99th District); Tom Kunse (100th District)
- State Senator: Roger Hauck (34th District)

(information as of June 2025)

== Attractions ==
Clare County is in the middle of large state forests. Wildlife, including bear, deer, eagles, Kirtland's warblers, and turkeys, are located nearby. Local attractions include:

- Kirtland's Warbler Habitat and Festival
- The Michigan Shore-to-Shore Trail passes through the area, running from Empire to Oscoda and points beyond. It is a 500-mile interconnected system of trails.

Activities include:

- Birding
- Boating
- Fishing
- Hiking
- Hunting
- Nordic skiing
- ORV and groomed snowmobile trails.
- Paddling (canoe and kayak)

== Communities ==
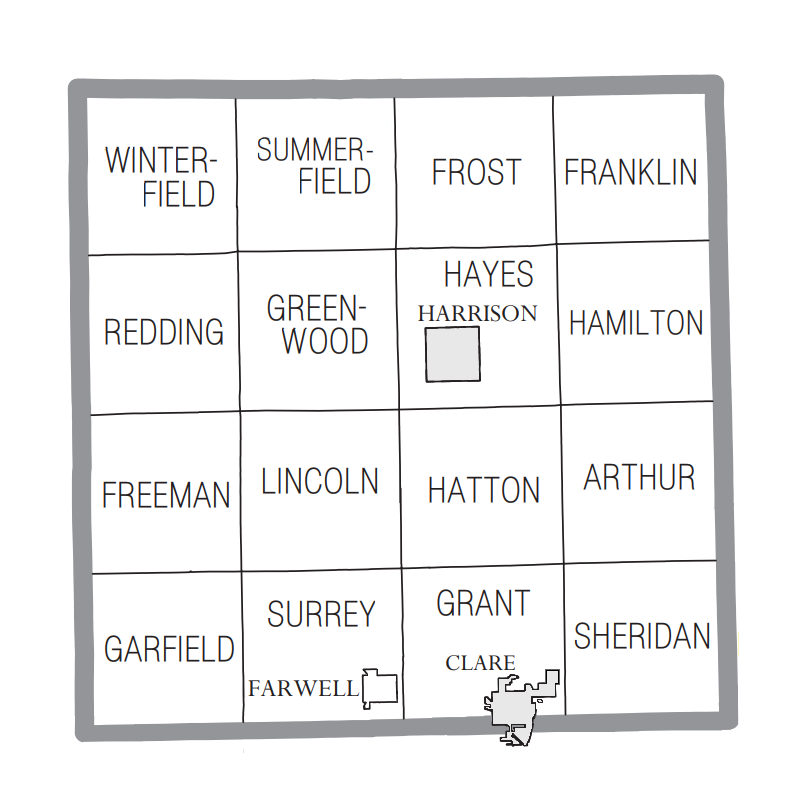
U.S. Census data map showing local municipal boundaries within Clare County; shaded areas represent incorporated cities

=== Cities ===
- Clare (partial)
- Harrison (county seat)

=== Village ===
- Farwell

=== Civil townships ===
- Arthur Township
- Franklin Township
- Freeman Township
- Frost Township
- Garfield Township
- Grant Township
- Greenwood Township
- Hamilton Township
- Hatton Township
- Hayes Township
- Lincoln Township
- Redding Township
- Sheridan Township
- Summerfield Township
- Surrey Township
- Winterfield Township

=== Unincorporated communities ===
- Airport Forest
- Allendale
- Ash Acres
- Buck Trails
- Colonville
- Cooperton
- Dover
- Hatton
- Lake
- Lake George
- Leota
- Long Lake Heights
- Meredith (partial)
- Phelps
- Piney Woods
- Rainbow Bend
- Temple

=== Ghost town ===
- Clarence

== Education ==
The Clare-Gladwin Regional Education Service District, based in Clare, services the students in the county in addition to those of Gladwin County. The intermediate school district offers regional special education services, early education and after-school programs, and technical career pathways for students of the district.

Clare County is served by the following public school districts:

- Clare Public Schools
- Farwell Area Schools
- Harrison Community Schools

Clare County has these private schools:

- East Dover School (Amish)
- Great Lakes Mennonite School (Mennonite)
- Shady Lawn Amish Parochial School (Amish)

== See also ==
- List of Michigan State Historic Sites in Clare County, Michigan
- National Register of Historic Places listings in Clare County, Michigan
