= Hatton Township, Michigan =

- Civil township
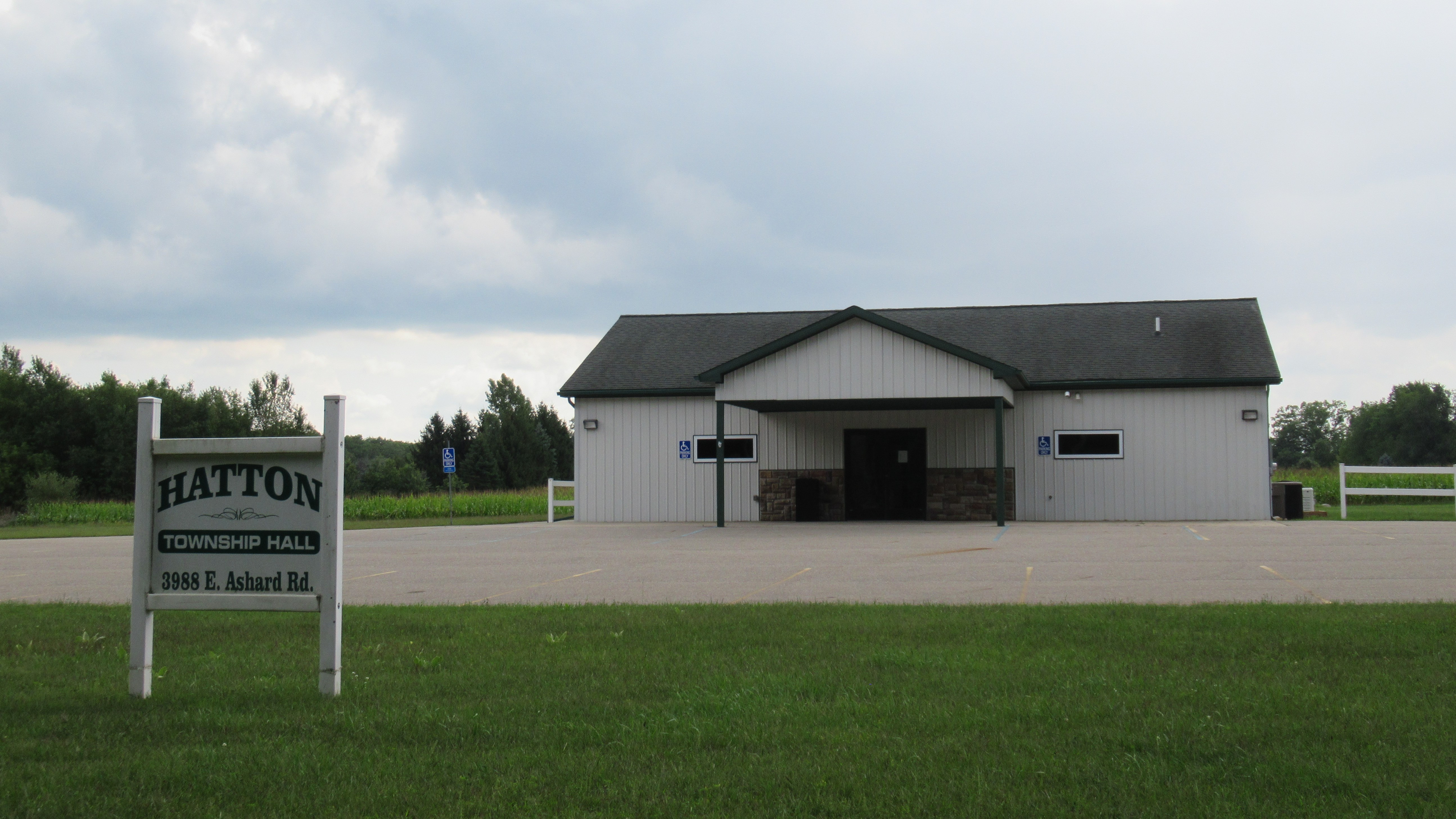
- Hatton Township Hall

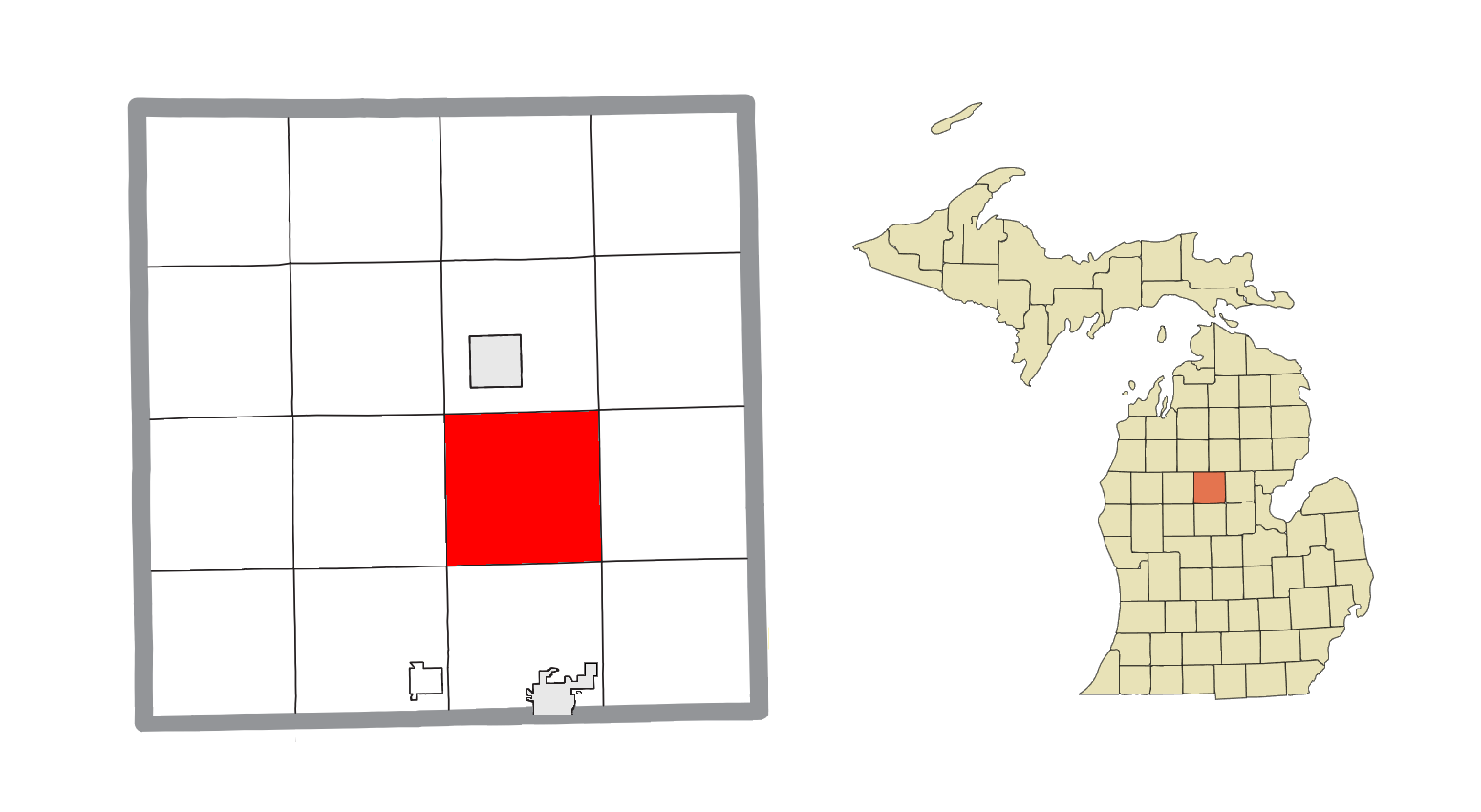
- Location within Clare County

- Location within the state of Michigan Location within the United States
- Coordinates: 43°56′30″N 84°46′33″W
- Country: United States
- State: Michigan
- County: Clare
- Established: 1886

Government
  - Supervisor: Bill Hileman
  - Clerk: Linda McClain

Area
  - Total: 36.14 sq mi (93.60 km^{2})
  - Land: 35.89 sq mi (92.95 km^{2})
  - Water: 0.25 sq mi (0.65 km^{2})
- Elevation: 1,106 ft (337 m)

Population (2020)
  - Total: 893
  - Density: 24.9/sq mi (9.6/km^{2})
- Time zone: UTC-5 (Eastern (EST))
  - Summer (DST): UTC-4 (EDT)
- ZIP code(s): 48617 (Clare); 48622 (Farwell); 48625 (Harrison)
- Area code: 989
- FIPS code: 26-37160
- GNIS feature ID: 1626450
- Website: Official website

Hatton Township is a civil township of Clare County in the U.S. state of Michigan. The population was 893 at the 2020 census.

== Communities ==
- Hatton is an unincorporated community in the southwest portion of the township at 43°55′22″N 84°49′07″W. The community began as a station along Pere Marquette Railway in 1881. A post office in Hatton began operating on May 18, 1882 until the community was destroyed by a fire in 1910.

== Geography ==
According to the U.S. Census Bureau, the township has a total area of 36.14 square miles (93.60 km^{2}), of which 35.89 square miles (92.95 km^{2}) is land and 0.25 square miles (0.65 km^{2}) (0.69%) is water.

=== Major highways ===
- US 127 runs south–north through the center of the township.
- M-61 (E. Gladwin Road) runs briefly along the northeast border of the township.

== Demographics ==
As of the census of 2000, there were 923 people, 333 households, and 245 families residing in the township. The population density was 25.7 inhabitants per square mile (9.9/km^{2}). There were 466 housing units at an average density of 13.0 per square mile (5.0/km^{2}). The racial makeup of the township was 97.29% White, 0.65% Native American, 0.65% Asian, 0.11% from other races, and 1.30% from two or more races. Hispanic or Latino of any race were 0.76% of the population.

There were 333 households, out of which 36.3% had children under the age of 18 living with them, 61.0% were married couples living together, 6.0% had a female householder with no husband present, and 26.4% were non-families. 20.1% of all households were made up of individuals, and 7.2% had someone living alone who was 65 years of age or older. The average household size was 2.77 and the average family size was 3.16.

In the township the population was spread out, with 31.2% under the age of 18, 6.6% from 18 to 24, 25.1% from 25 to 44, 25.5% from 45 to 64, and 11.6% who were 65 years of age or older. The median age was 35 years. For every 100 females, there were 101.5 males. For every 100 females age 18 and over, there were 102.9 males.

The median income for a household in the township was $30,461, and the median income for a family was $33,229. Males had a median income of $36,000 versus $19,583 for females. The per capita income for the township was $15,848. About 10.2% of families and 11.3% of the population were below the poverty line, including 12.3% of those under age 18 and 12.6% of those age 65 or over.

== Education ==
The township is served by two separate public school district. The majority of the township is served by Harrison Community Schools to the north in Harrison. The eastern portion of the township is served by Clare Public Schools to the south in the city of Clare.
