= Grant Township, Clare County, Michigan =

Grant Township, Michigan
- Civil township
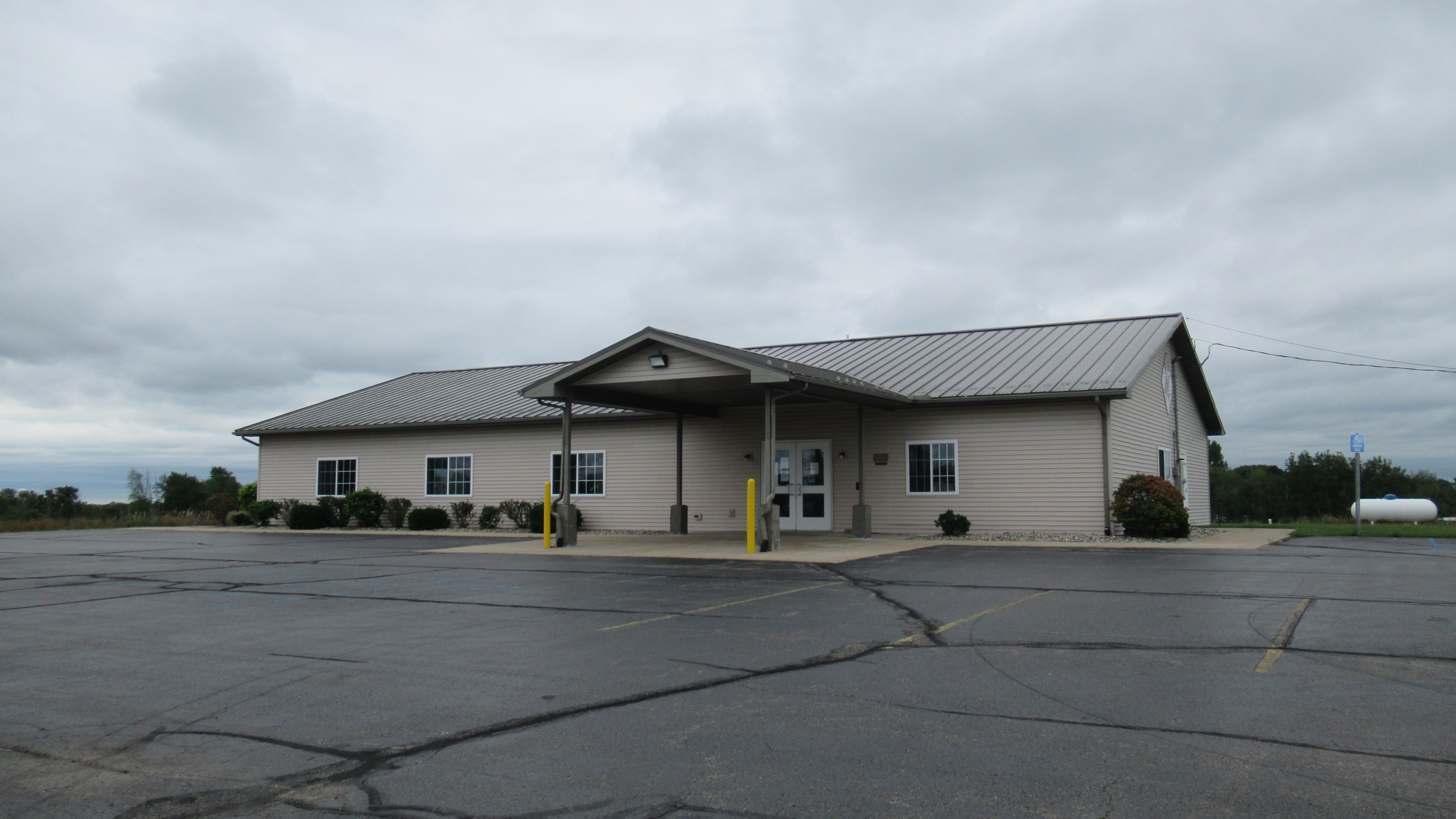
- Grant Township Hall

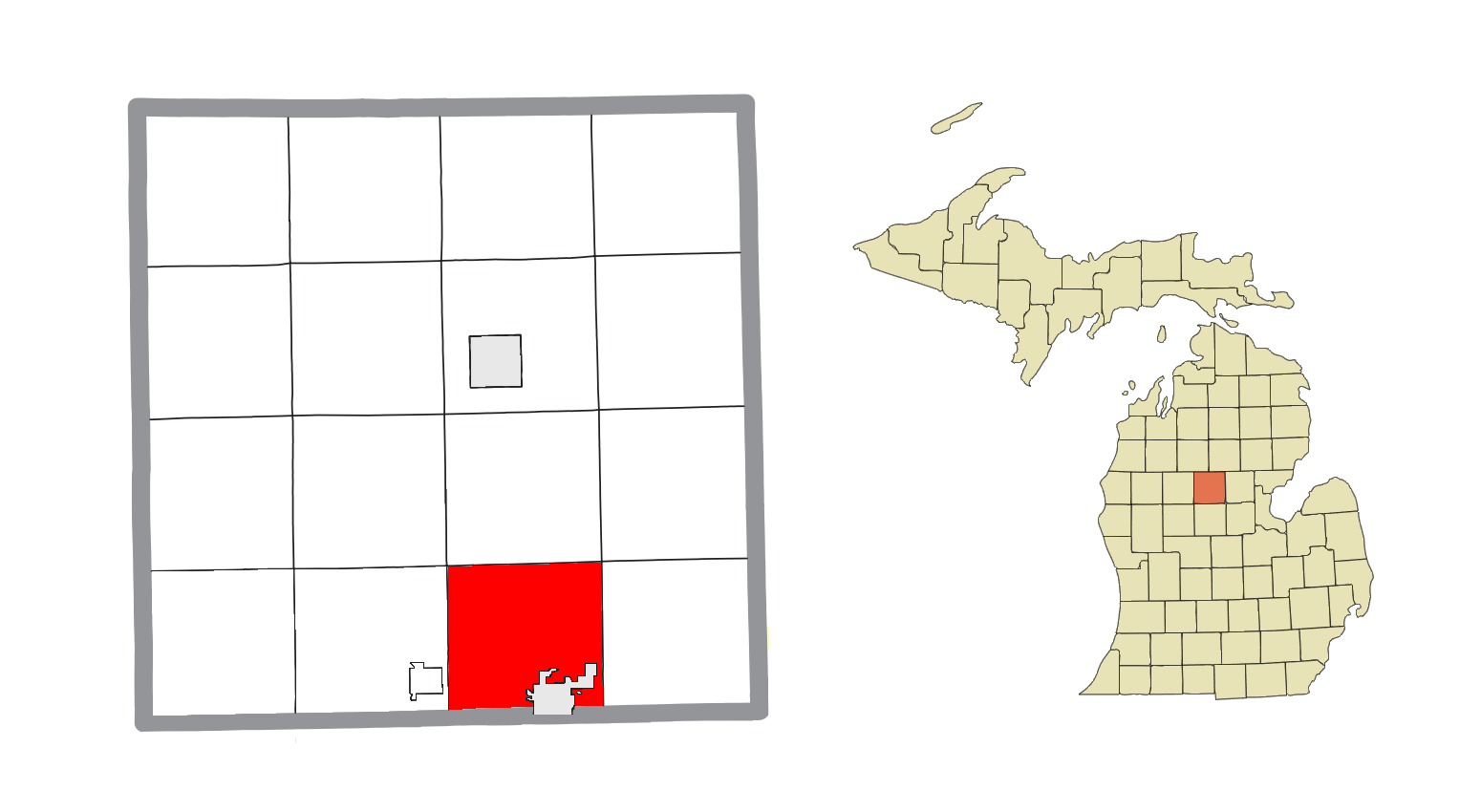
- Location within Clare County

- Location within the state of Michigan Location within the United States
- Coordinates: 43°51′55″N 84°47′52″W
- Country: United States
- State: Michigan
- County: Clare
- Established: 1896

Government
  - Supervisor: Dan Dysinger
  - Clerk: Tammy Teall

Area
  - Total: 33.25 sq mi (86.1 km^{2})
  - Land: 32.76 sq mi (84.8 km^{2})
  - Water: 0.49 sq mi (1.3 km^{2})
- Elevation: 925 ft (282 m)

Population (2020)
  - Total: 3,360
  - Density: 102.6/sq mi (39.6/km^{2})
- Time zone: UTC-5 (Eastern (EST))
  - Summer (DST): UTC-4 (EDT)
- ZIP code(s): 48617 (Clare); 48622 (Farwell)
- Area code: 989
- FIPS code: 26-34220
- GNIS feature ID: 1626377
- Website: Official website

Grant Township is a civil township of Clare County in the U.S. state of Michigan. The population was 3,360 at the 2020 census.

== Communities ==
- Dover is an unincorporated community located in the northeast portion of the township at 43°53′15″N 84°44′52″W. William Crawford, who was one of the first settlers in the county, moved here with his family in 1866. A post office in Dover operated from April 24, 1882, until February 15, 1905.

== Geography ==
According to the U.S. Census Bureau, the township has a total area of 33.25 square miles (86.12 km^{2}), of which 32.76 square miles (84.85 km^{2}) is land 0.49 square miles (1.27 km^{2}) (1.47%) is water.

=== Major highways ===
- US 10 enters through the township from the west and briefly runs concurrently with US 127.
- US 127 runs south–north through the center of the township.
- Bus. US 10 is a business loop route that runs briefly north out of the city of Clare.
- Bus. US 127 is a business loop route that has portions concurrent with Bus. US 10.
- M-115 runs through the southwestern portion of the township.

== Demographics ==
As of the census of 2000, there were 3,034 people, 1,151 households, and 874 families residing in the township. The population density was 91.3 inhabitants per square mile (35.3/km^{2}). There were 1,367 housing units at an average density of 41.1 per square mile (15.9/km^{2}). The racial makeup of the township was 97.33% White, 0.13% African American, 0.59% Native American, 0.36% Asian, 0.40% from other races, and 1.19% from two or more races. Hispanic or Latino of any race were 0.53% of the population.

There were 1,151 households, out of which 32.9% had children under the age of 18 living with them, 64.1% were married couples living together, 7.4% had a female householder with no husband present, and 24.0% were non-families. 20.3% of all households were made up of individuals, and 8.6% had someone living alone who was 65 years of age or older. The average household size was 2.62 and the average family size was 3.02.

In the township the population was spread out, with 25.7% under the age of 18, 7.7% from 18 to 24, 26.3% from 25 to 44, 26.0% from 45 to 64, and 14.3% who were 65 years of age or older. The median age was 39 years. For every 100 females, there were 102.0 males. For every 100 females age 18 and over, there were 101.8 males.

The median income for a household in the township was $35,245, and the median income for a family was $41,607. Males had a median income of $31,193 versus $21,400 for females. The per capita income for the township was $17,597. About 8.3% of families and 11.1% of the population were below the poverty line, including 16.2% of those under age 18 and 10.0% of those age 65 or over.

== Education ==
The township is served by two separate public school districts. Most of the township is served by Clare Public Schools. The western portion of the township is served by Farwell Area Schools to the west in the village of Farwell.
