= Frost Township, Michigan =

- Civil township
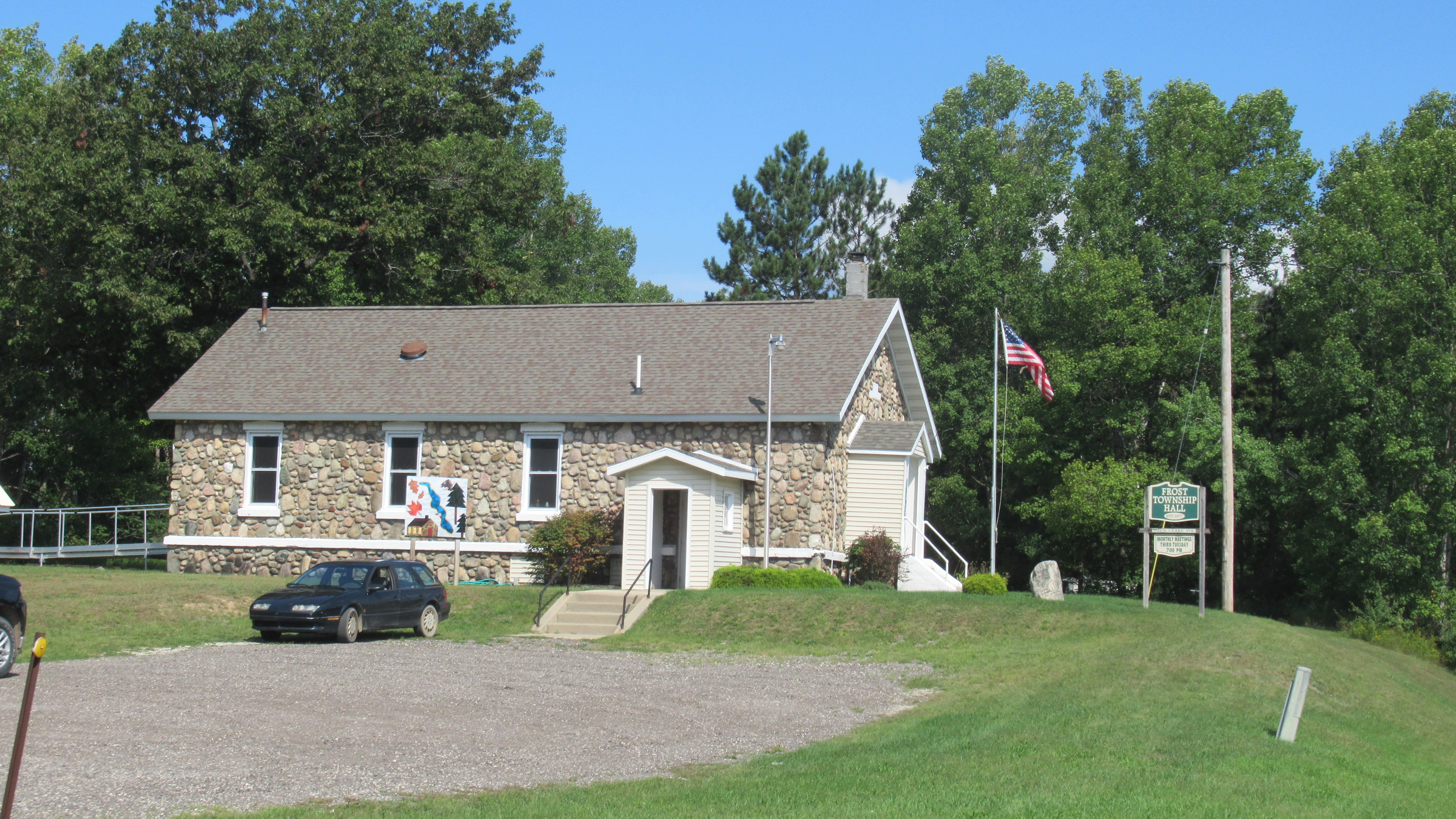
- Frost Township Hall

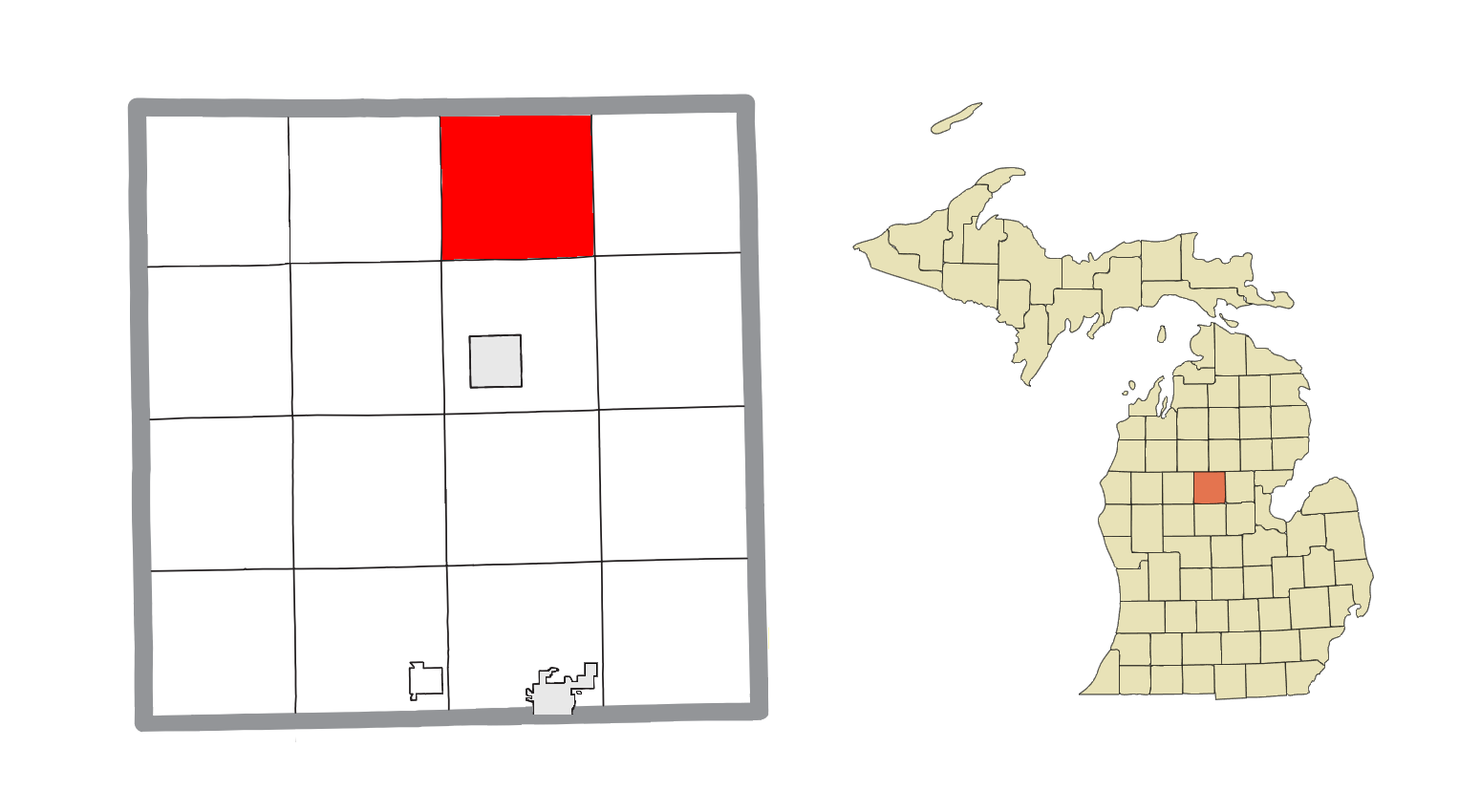
- Location within Clare County

- Location within the state of Michigan Location within the United States
- Coordinates: 44°07′06″N 84°47′49″W
- Country: United States
- State: Michigan
- County: Clare
- Established: 1877

Government
  - Supervisor: Marion Coon
  - Clerk: Joan Rattray

Area
  - Total: 35.52 sq mi (92.0 km^{2})
  - Land: 34.95 sq mi (90.5 km^{2})
  - Water: 0.57 sq mi (1.5 km^{2})
- Elevation: 1,142 ft (348 m)

Population (2020)
  - Total: 1,038
  - Density: 29.7/sq mi (11.5/km^{2})
- Time zone: UTC-5 (Eastern (EST))
  - Summer (DST): UTC-4 (EDT)
- ZIP code(s): 48625 (Harrison)
- Area code: 989
- FIPS code: 26-30900
- GNIS feature ID: 1626323
- Website: Official website

Frost Township is a civil township of Clare County in the U.S. state of Michigan. The population was 1,038 at the 2020 census.

== Communities ==
- Cooperton is an unincorporated community located along Old US Highway 27 in the northern portion of the township at 44°09′27″N 84°47′09″W.
- Long Lake Heights is an unincorporated community on the northern shores of Long Lake at 44°05′57″N 84°46′28″W. The community had its own rural post office named Longlake from June 20, 1899, to May 15, 1912.
- Piney Woods is an unincorporated community along the southern boundary of the township at 44°04′24″N 84°48′30″W. Most of the communities is located to the south in Hayes Township.

== Geography ==
According to the U.S. Census Bureau, the township has a total area of 35.52 square miles (92.00 km^{2}), of which 34.95 square miles (90.52 km^{2}) is land and 0.57 square miles (1.48 km^{2}) (1.60%) is water.

=== Major highways ===
- US 127 runs south–north through the center of the township.

== Demographics ==
As of the census of 2000, there were 1,159 people, 495 households, and 325 families residing in the township. The population density was 33.1 inhabitants per square mile (12.8/km^{2}). There were 1,190 housing units at an average density of 34.0 per square mile (13.1/km^{2}). The racial makeup of the township was 96.38% White, 0.69% African American, 0.95% Native American, 0.17% Asian, 0.09% Pacific Islander, 0.09% from other races, and 1.64% from two or more races. Hispanic or Latino of any race were 1.47% of the population.

There were 495 households, out of which 21.6% had children under the age of 18 living with them, 53.9% were married couples living together, 6.5% had a female householder with no husband present, and 34.3% were non-families. 26.7% of all households were made up of individuals, and 12.1% had someone living alone who was 65 years of age or older. The average household size was 2.33 and the average family size was 2.75.

In the township the population was spread out, with 21.6% under the age of 18, 4.8% from 18 to 24, 22.9% from 25 to 44, 31.2% from 45 to 64, and 19.5% who were 65 years of age or older. The median age was 45 years. For every 100 females, there were 103.3 males. For every 100 females age 18 and over, there were 102.9 males.

The median income for a household in the township was $27,243, and the median income for a family was $32,768. Males had a median income of $27,250 versus $22,386 for females. The per capita income for the township was $16,387. About 13.1% of families and 16.9% of the population were below the poverty line, including 23.5% of those under age 18 and 10.3% of those age 65 or over.

== Education ==
The entire township is served by Harrison Community Schools to the south in Harrison.
