= Greenwood Township, Clare County, Michigan =

Greenwood Township, Michigan
- Civil township
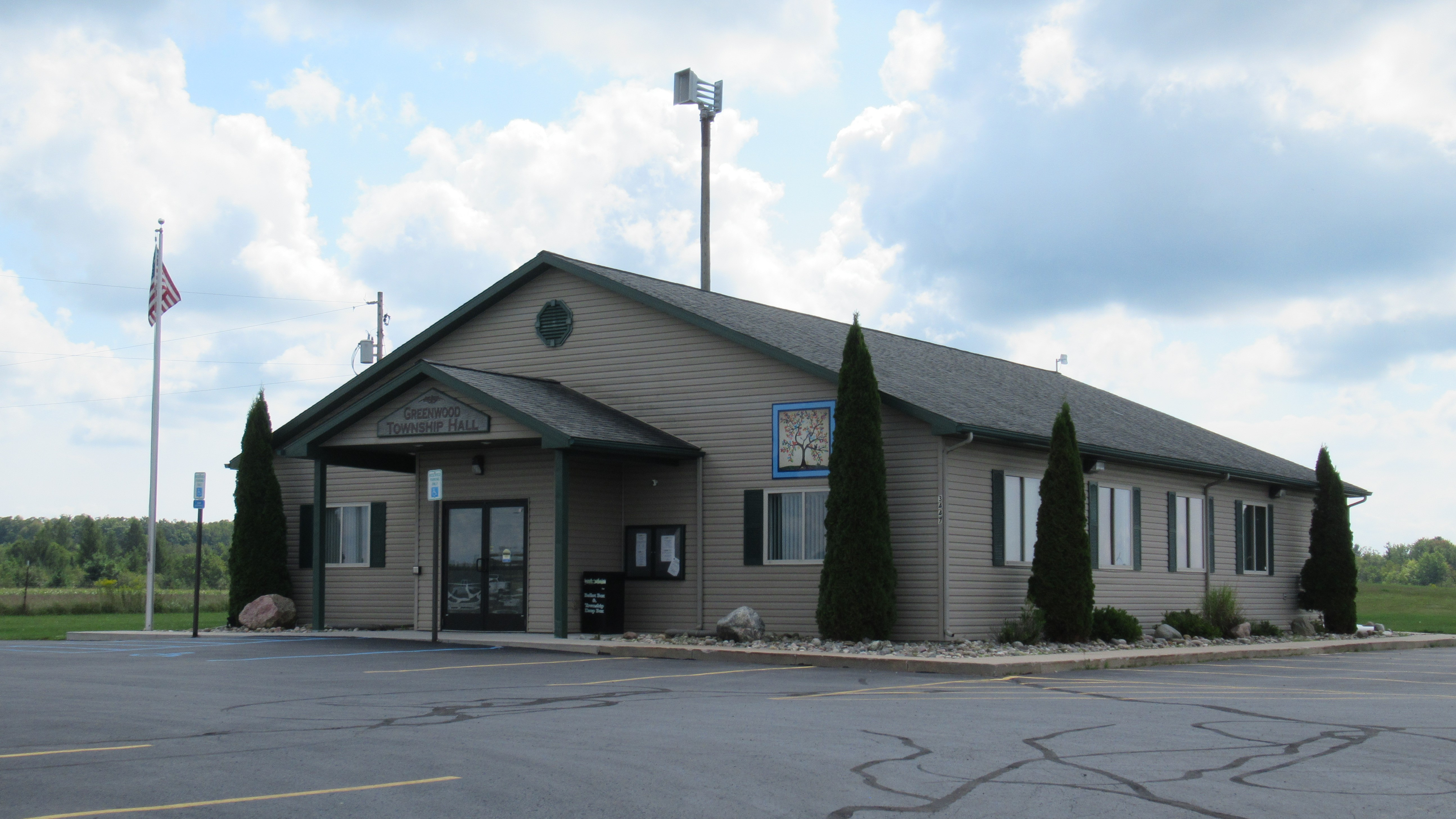
- Greedwood Township Hall

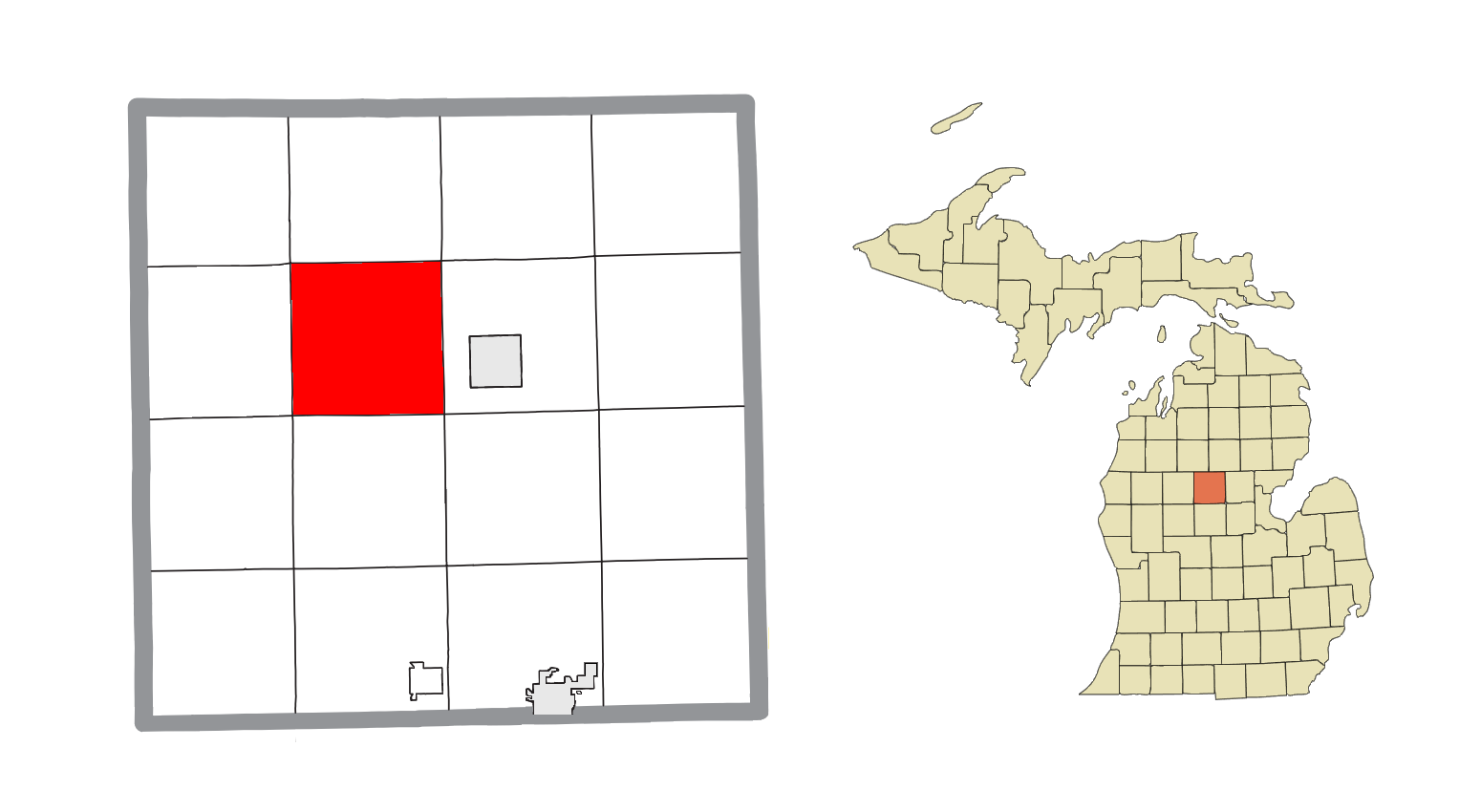
- Location within Clare County

- Location within the state of Michigan Location within the United States
- Coordinates: 44°01′26″N 84°55′20″W
- Country: United States
- State: Michigan
- County: Clare
- Established: 1884

Government
  - Supervisor: Jess McClaughry
  - Clerk: Rachel Mackson

Area
  - Total: 35.50 sq mi (91.94 km^{2})
  - Land: 35.20 sq mi (91.17 km^{2})
  - Water: 0.20 sq mi (0.52 km^{2})
- Elevation: 1,165 ft (355 m)

Population (2020)
  - Total: 1,108
  - Density: 31.4/sq mi (12.1/km^{2})
- Time zone: UTC-5 (Eastern (EST))
  - Summer (DST): UTC-4 (EDT)
- ZIP code(s): 48625 (Harrison)
- Area code: 989
- FIPS code: 26-35120
- GNIS feature ID: 1626402
- Website: Official website

Greenwood Township is a civil township of Clare County in the U.S. state of Michigan. The population was 1,108 at the 2020 census.

== Geography ==
According to the U.S. Census Bureau, the township has a total area of 35.50 square miles (91.94 km^{2}), of which 35.20 square miles (91.17 km^{2}) is land and 0.20 square miles (0.52 km^{2}) (0.56%) is water.

=== Major highways ===
- M-61 runs east–west through the center of the township.

== Demographics ==
As of the census of 2000, there were 1,059 people, 438 households, and 328 families residing in the township. The population density was 30.1 inhabitants per square mile (11.6/km^{2}). There were 861 housing units at an average density of 24.5 per square mile (9.5/km^{2}). The racial makeup of the township was 98.39% White, 0.57% Native American, 0.19% from other races, and 0.85% from two or more races. Hispanic or Latino of any race were 0.47% of the population.

There were 438 households, out of which 24.7% had children under the age of 18 living with them, 61.9% were married couples living together, 8.2% had a female householder with no husband present, and 25.1% were non-families. 20.3% of all households were made up of individuals, and 6.6% had someone living alone who was 65 years of age or older. The average household size was 2.42 and the average family size was 2.71.

In the township the population was spread out, with 21.2% under the age of 18, 6.2% from 18 to 24, 22.8% from 25 to 44, 32.1% from 45 to 64, and 17.8% who were 65 years of age or older. The median age was 45 years. For every 100 females, there were 100.9 males. For every 100 females age 18 and over, there were 102.2 males.

The median income for a household in the township was $32,228, and the median income for a family was $35,703. Males had a median income of $31,161 versus $19,706 for females. The per capita income for the township was $17,283. About 9.6% of families and 16.0% of the population were below the poverty line, including 21.1% of those under age 18 and 14.8% of those age 65 or over.

== Education ==
The township is served entirely by Harrison Community Schools to the east in the city of Harrison.
