= Redding Township, Michigan =

- Civil township
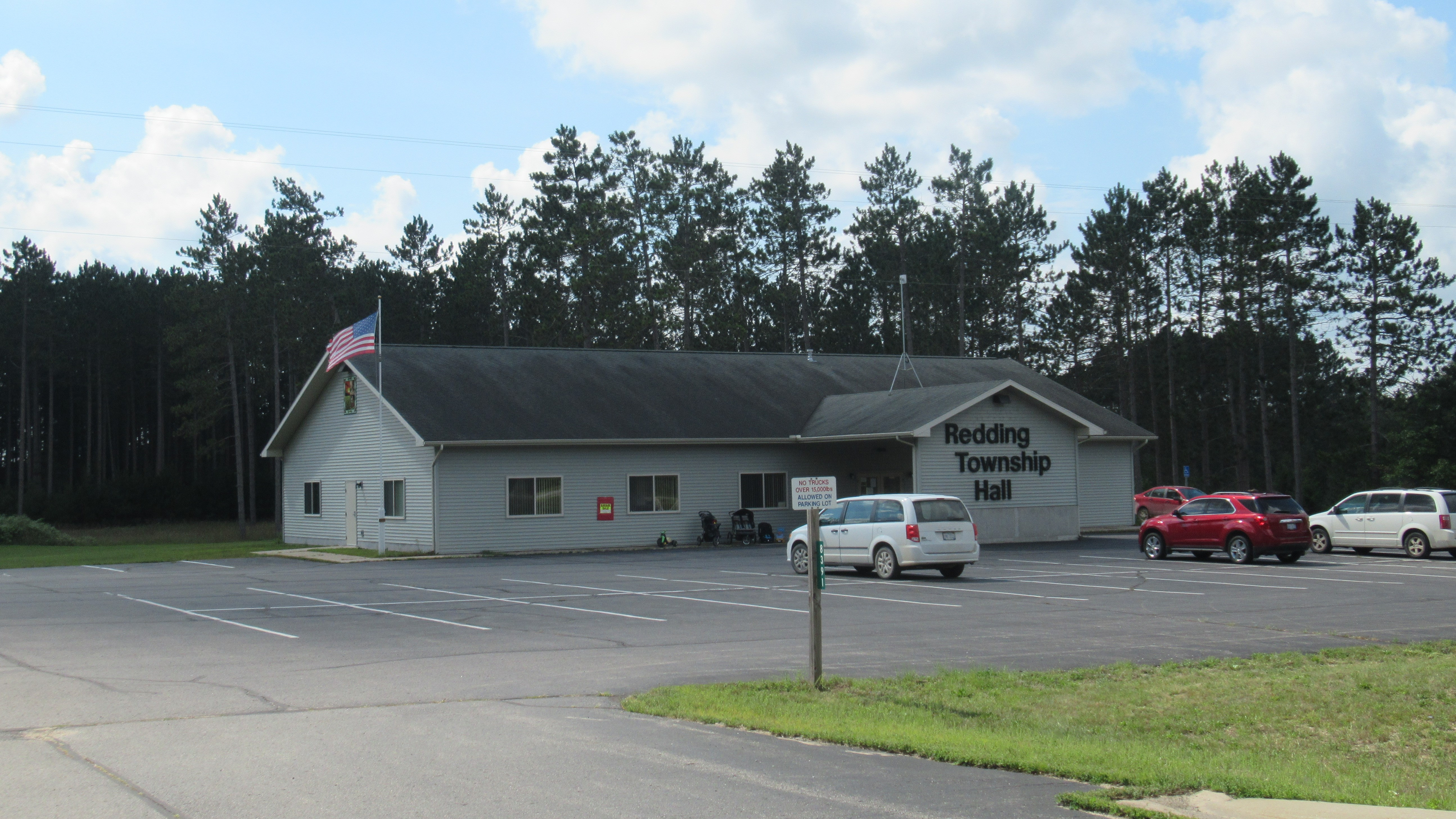
- Redding Township Hall

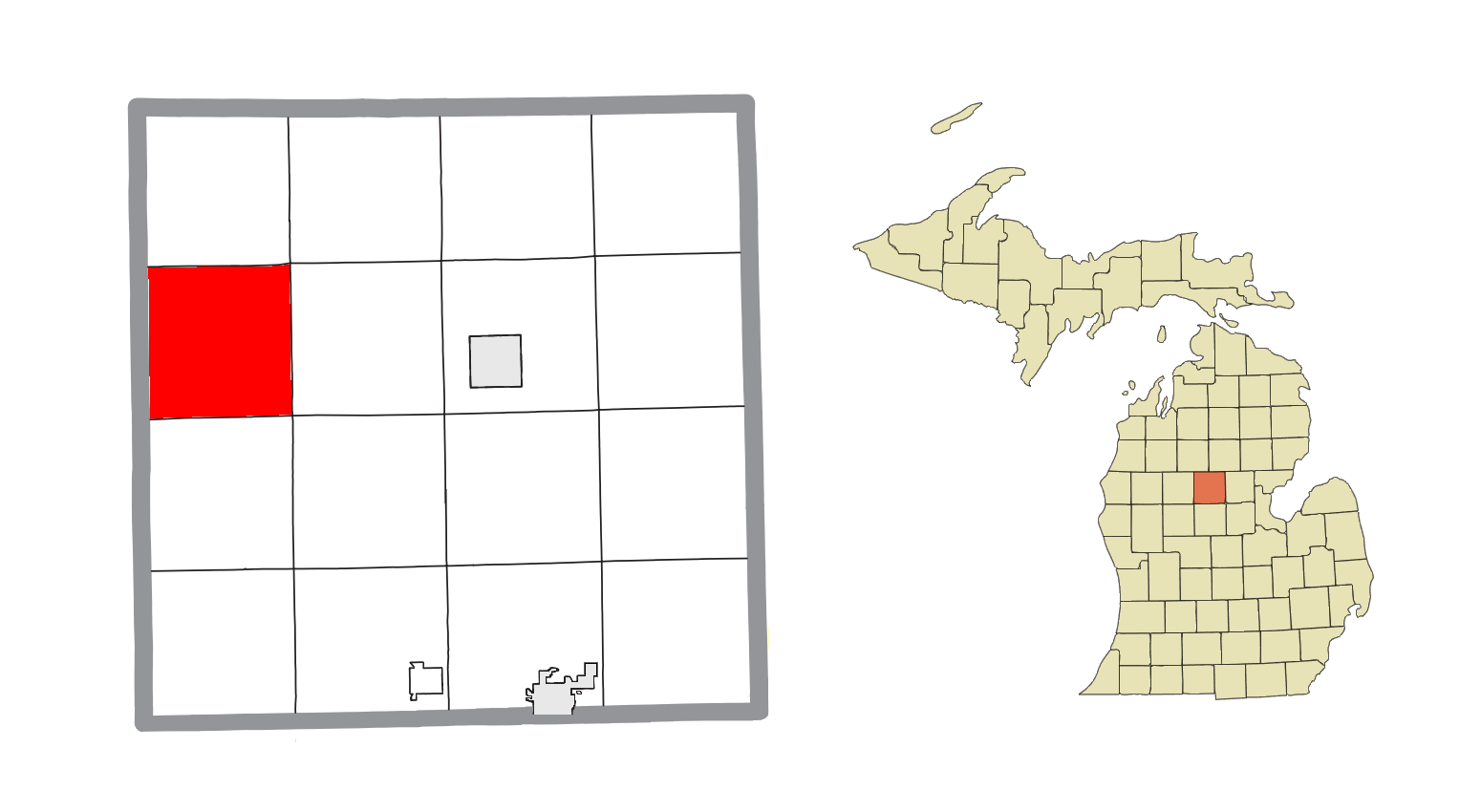
- Location within Clare County

- Location within the state of Michigan Location within the United States
- Coordinates: 44°01′53″N 85°01′38″W
- Country: United States
- State: Michigan
- County: Clare
- Established: 1891

Government
  - Supervisor: Bruce Scarbrough
  - Clerk: Susie Brower

Area
  - Total: 35.43 sq mi (91.76 km^{2})
  - Land: 34.90 sq mi (90.39 km^{2})
  - Water: 0.53 sq mi (1.37 km^{2})
- Elevation: 1,053 ft (321 m)

Population (2020)
  - Total: 459
  - Density: 13.2/sq mi (5.1/km^{2})
- Time zone: UTC-5 (Eastern (EST))
  - Summer (DST): UTC-4 (EDT)
- ZIP code(s): 48625 (Harrison); 48632 (Lake); 49665 (Marion)
- Area code: 989
- FIPS code: 26-67600
- GNIS feature ID: 1626959
- Website: https://reddingtownship.net/

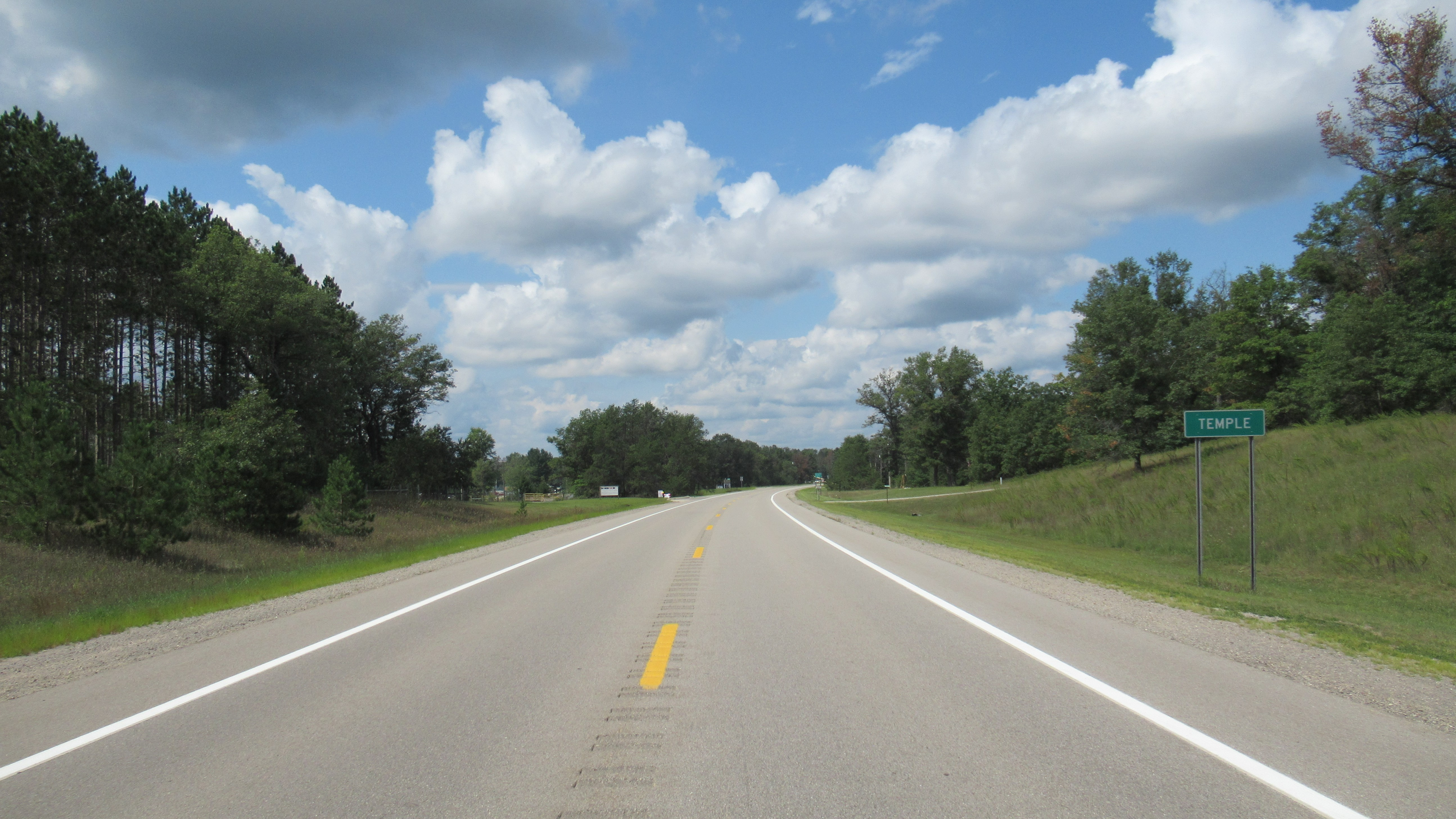
Community of Temple along M-61

Redding Township is a civil township of Clare County in the U.S. state of Michigan. The population was 459 at the 2020 census.

== Communities ==
- Clarence is a former settlement located along the Toledo and Ann Arbor Railroad. It was settled around 1888 around a mill operated by the Clarence Lumber Company. A now-defunct post office opened on January 12, 1893.
- Temple is an unincorporated community located along M-61 in the center of the township at 44°01′51″N 85°01′42″W. It was settled in 1889 as a station along the Toledo, Ann Arbor, and Northern Michigan Railroad, which was succeeded in 1895 by the Ann Arbor Railroad. The hamlet was settled on land given by Mary Campbell, and the community was originally called Campbell City. A post office opened on April 21, 1890, and was named Temple after local resident Martin Temple. The post office operated until August 12, 1966. Temple became a busy location for milling lumber, but lost business in the first decades of the 20th century to larger towns.

== Geography ==
According to the U.S. Census Bureau, the township has a total area of 35.43 square miles (91.76 km^{2}), of which 34.90 square miles (90.39 km^{2}) is land and 0.53 square miles (1.37 km^{2}) (1.50%) is water.

The Muskegon River flows southwest through the center of the township.

=== Major highways ===
- M-61 (Temple Drive) runs east–west through the center of the township.
- M-115 runs just outside the southwest corner of the township.

== Demographics ==
As of the census of 2000, there were 526 people, 219 households, and 153 families residing in the township. The population density was 14.9 per square mile (5.8/km^{2}). There were 497 housing units at an average density of 14.1 per square mile (5.4/km^{2}). The racial makeup of the township was 97.15% White, 0.57% African American, 0.38% Asian, 0.38% from other races, and 1.52% from two or more races. Hispanic or Latino of any race were 0.57% of the population.

There were 219 households, out of which 26.0% had children under the age of 18 living with them, 53.4% were married couples living together, 6.8% had a female householder with no husband present, and 30.1% were non-families. 24.7% of all households were made up of individuals, and 11.0% had someone living alone who was 65 years of age or older. The average household size was 2.40 and the average family size was 2.79.

In the township the population was spread out, with 24.1% under the age of 18, 6.7% from 18 to 24, 25.9% from 25 to 44, 27.8% from 45 to 64, and 15.6% who were 65 years of age or older. The median age was 42 years. For every 100 females, there were 104.7 males. For every 100 females age 18 and over, there were 108.9 males.

The median income for a household in the township was $24,438, and the median income for a family was $28,864. Males had a median income of $25,469 versus $26,000 for females. The per capita income for the township was $14,687. About 16.5% of families and 19.4% of the population were below the poverty line, including 20.2% of those under age 18 and 11.7% of those age 65 or over.

== Education ==
The entire township is served by Marion Public Schools to the northwest in the village of Marion in Osceola Township.

== Sources ==
- Romig, Walter (October 1, 1986) [1973]. Michigan Place Names: The History of the Founding and the Naming of More Than Five Thousand Past and Present Michigan Communities (Paperback). Great Lakes Books Series. Detroit, Michigan: Wayne State University Press. pp. 184, 220, 403, 581, 588. ISBN 978-0-8143-1838-6.
