= Sheridan Township, Clare County, Michigan =

Sheridan Township, Michigan
- Civil township
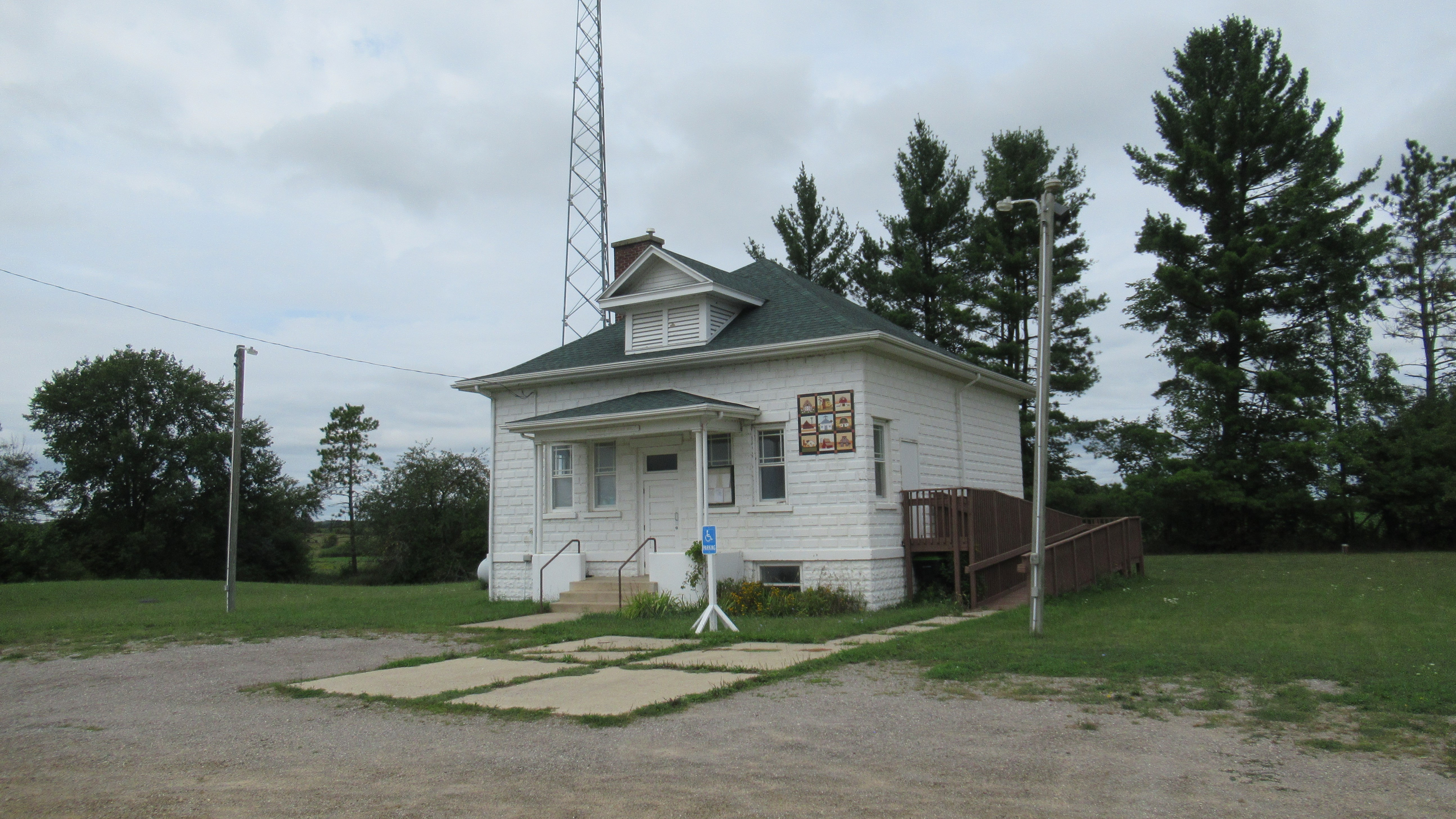
- Sheridan Township Hall

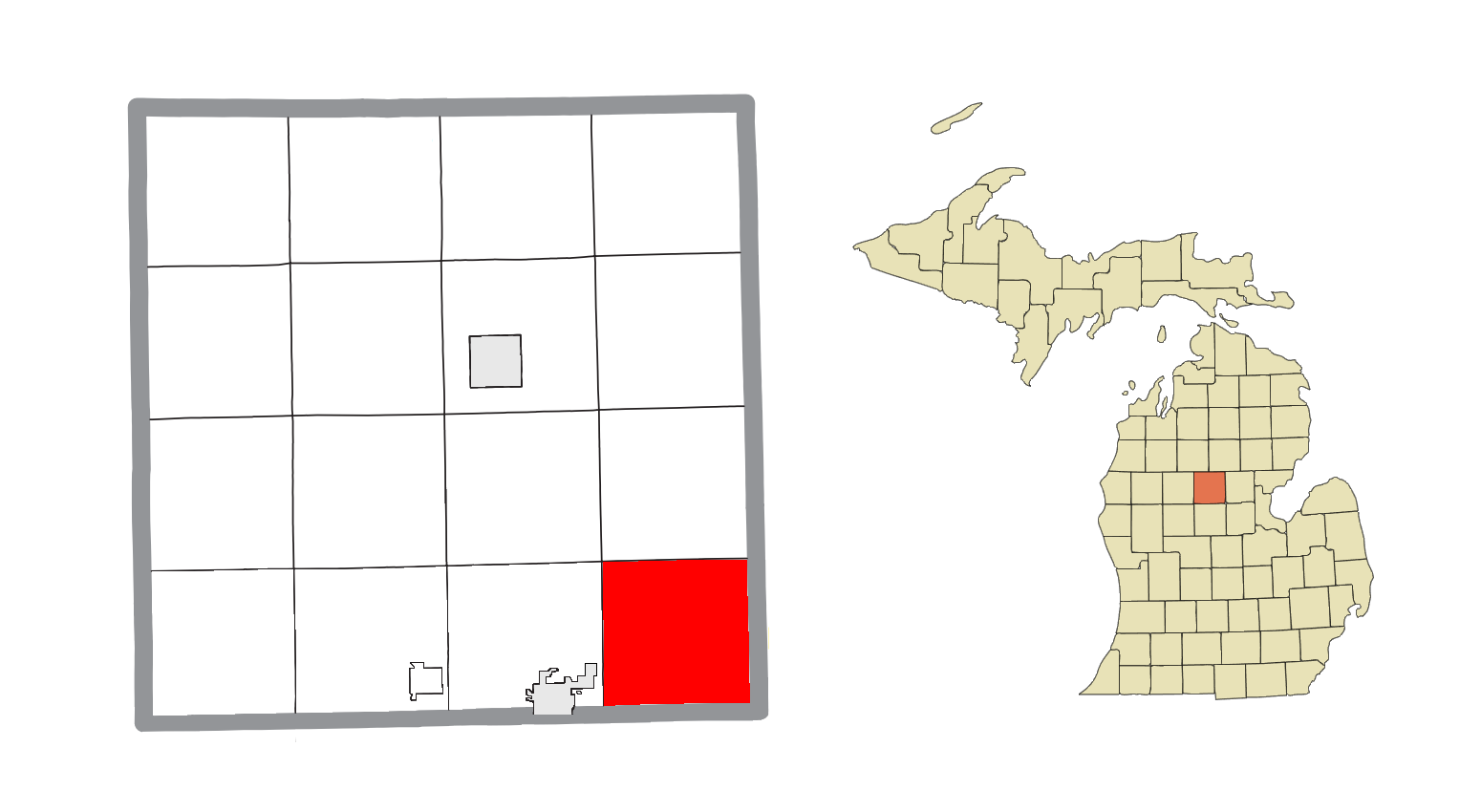
- Location within Clare County

- Location within the state of Michigan Location within the United States
- Coordinates: 43°51′44″N 84°39′50″W
- Country: United States
- State: Michigan
- County: Clare
- Established: 1870

Government
  - Supervisor: William Strouse
  - Clerk: Leane Strouse

Area
  - Total: 36.50 sq mi (94.53 km^{2})
  - Land: 36.15 sq mi (93.63 km^{2})
  - Water: 0.35 sq mi (0.91 km^{2})
- Elevation: 791 ft (241 m)

Population (2020)
  - Total: 1,548
  - Density: 42.8/sq mi (16.5/km^{2})
- Time zone: UTC-5 (Eastern (EST))
  - Summer (DST): UTC-4 (EDT)
- ZIP code(s): 48617 (Clare)
- Area code: 989
- FIPS code: 26-73000
- GNIS feature ID: 1627065
- Website: Official website

Sheridan Township is a civil township of Clare County in the U.S. state of Michigan. The population was 1,548 at the 2020 census.

== Communities ==
- Colonville is an unincorporated community located within the township at 43°50′39″N 84°42′21″W. The community began with a rural post office established on December 4, 1894 with storekeeper Curtis Palmer serving as the first postmaster. The post office operated until January 15, 1904.

== Geography ==
According to the U.S. Census Bureau, the township has a total area of 36.50 square miles (94.53 km^{2}), of which 36.15 square miles (93.63 km^{2}) is land and 0.35 square miles (0.91 km^{2}) (0.96%) is water.

The South Branch of the Tobacco River flows through the southern portion of the township.

== Demographics ==
As of the census of 2000, there were 1,588 people, 482 households, and 382 families residing in the township. The population density was 43.7 inhabitants per square mile (16.9/km^{2}). There were 569 housing units at an average density of 15.7 per square mile (6.0/km^{2}). The racial makeup of the township was 97.61% White, 0.57% African American, 0.76% Native American, 0.06% Asian, 0.06% from other races, and 0.94% from two or more races. Hispanic or Latino of any race were 0.88% of the population.

There were 482 households, out of which 45.2% had children under the age of 18 living with them, 66.0% were married couples living together, 8.7% had a female householder with no husband present, and 20.7% were non-families. 16.8% of all households were made up of individuals, and 6.8% had someone living alone who was 65 years of age or older. The average household size was 3.28 and the average family size was 3.72.

In the township the population was spread out, with 37.0% under the age of 18, 9.3% from 18 to 24, 28.4% from 25 to 44, 17.5% from 45 to 64, and 7.8% who were 65 years of age or older. The median age was 29 years. For every 100 females, there were 94.6 males. For every 100 females age 18 and over, there were 95.3 males.

The median income for a household in the township was $32,069, and the median income for a family was $34,107. Males had a median income of $28,300 versus $22,841 for females. The per capita income for the township was $12,163. About 17.9% of families and 22.2% of the population were below the poverty line, including 31.7% of those under age 18 and 24.6% of those age 65 or over.

== Education ==
The entire township is served by Clare Public Schools to the west in the city of Clare.
