= Summerfield Township, Clare County, Michigan =

Summerfield Township, Michigan
- Civil township
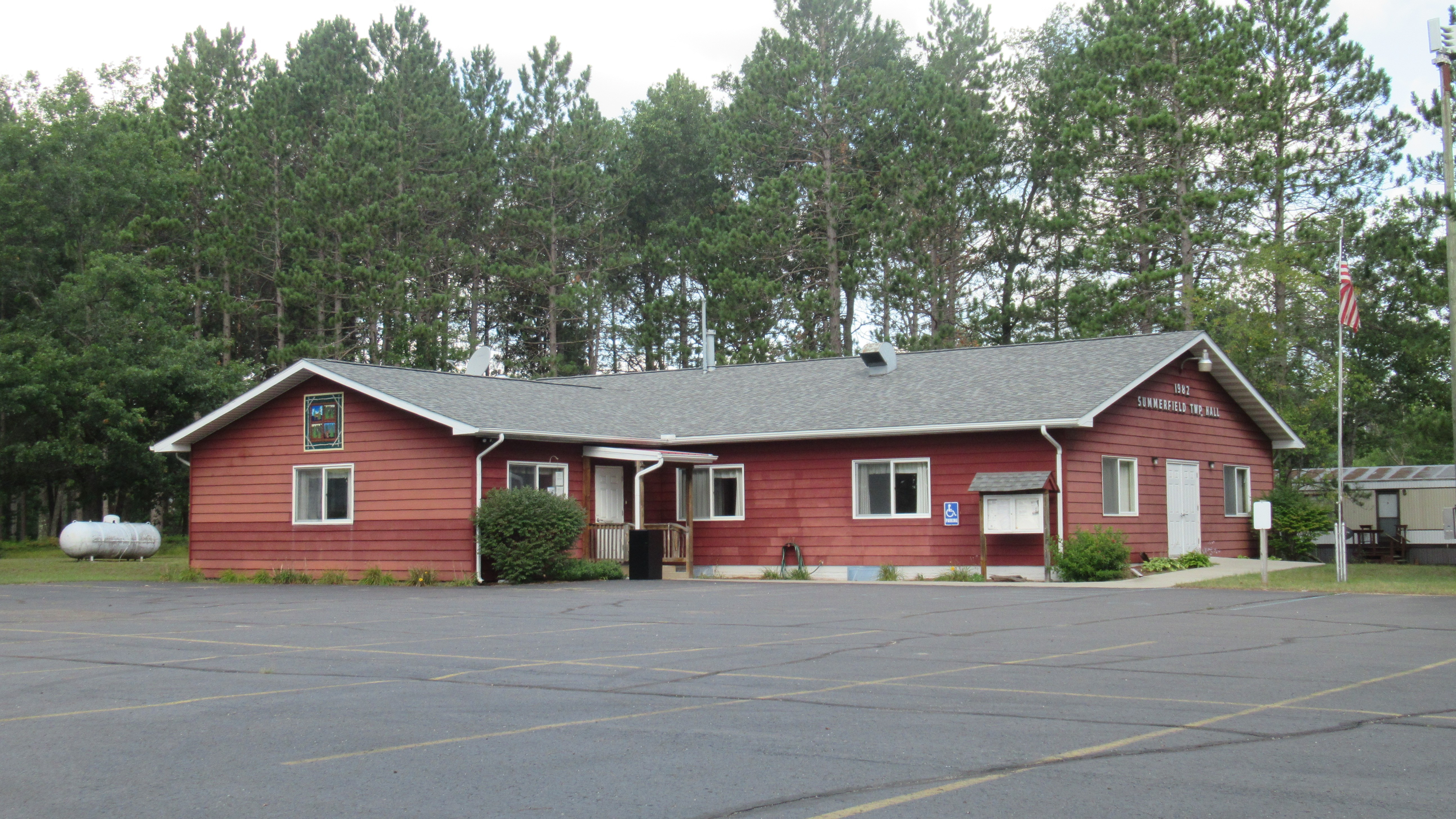
- Summerfield Township Hall

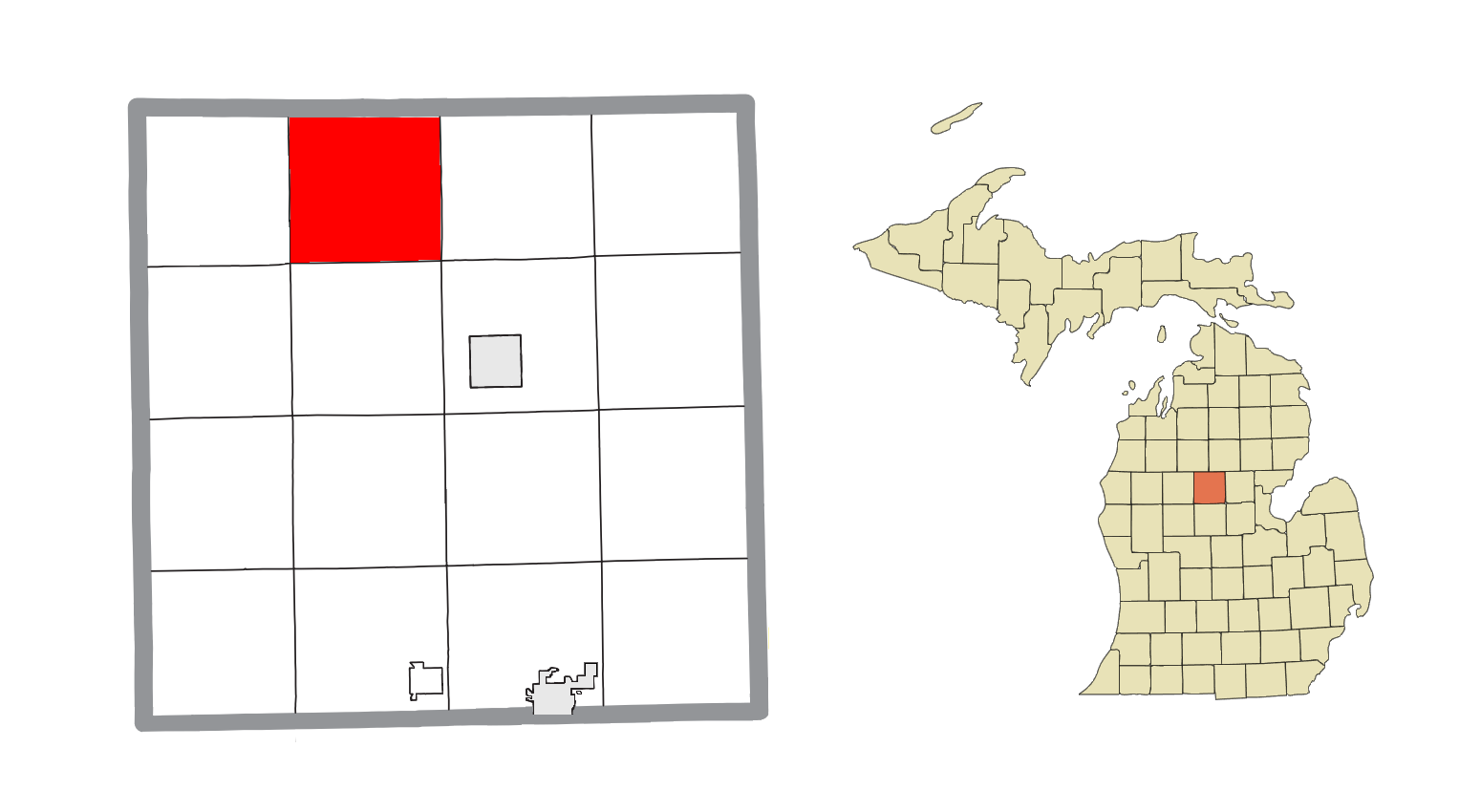
- Location within Clare County

- Location within the state of Michigan Summerfield Township (the United States)
- Coordinates: 44°07′38″N 84°55′05″W
- Country: United States
- State: Michigan
- County: Clare
- Established: 1873

Government
  - Supervisor: Dave Wilhelm
  - Clerk: Jaclyn Hall

Area
  - Total: 35.90 sq mi (92.98 km^{2})
  - Land: 35.20 sq mi (91.17 km^{2})
  - Water: 0.70 sq mi (1.81 km^{2})
- Elevation: 1,096 ft (334 m)

Population (2010)
  - Total: 456
  - Density: 13/sq mi (5.0/km^{2})
- Time zone: UTC-5 (Eastern (EST))
  - Summer (DST): UTC-4 (EDT)
- ZIP code(s): 48625 (Harrison); 49632 (Falmouth)
- Area code: 989
- FIPS code: 26-77120
- GNIS feature ID: 1627133
- Website: Official website

Summerfield Township is a civil township of Clare County in the U.S. state of Michigan. The population was 459 at the 2020 census.

== Communities ==
- Buck Trails is an unincorporated community located in the southeast portion of the township at 44°06′05″N 84°51′28″W.
- Leota is an unincorporated community in the northern portion of the township along the Muskegon River at 44°08′22″N 84°53′22″W. Located about 12.0 miles (19.3 km) north of Harrison, a now-defunct post office was established here on June 15, 1899.
- Rainbow Bend is an unincorporated community within the township along the Muskegon River at 44°07′43″N 84°55′18″W.

== Geography ==
According to the U.S. Census Bureau, the township has a total area of 35.90 square miles (92.98 km^{2}), of which 35.20 square miles (91.17 km^{2}) is land and 0.70 square miles (1.81 km^{2}) (1.95%) is water.

The Muskegon River flows through the township.

== Demographics ==
As of the census of 2000, there were 453 people, 217 households, and 134 families residing in the township. The population density was 12.7 per square mile (4.9/km^{2}). There were 639 housing units at an average density of 17.9 per square mile (6.9/km^{2}). The racial makeup of the township was 98.68% White, 0.44% Native American, and 0.88% from two or more races. Hispanic or Latino of any race were 0.88% of the population.

There were 217 households, out of which 16.1% had children under the age of 18 living with them, 52.5% were married couples living together, 5.1% had a female householder with no husband present, and 37.8% were non-families. 31.3% of all households were made up of individuals, and 14.3% had someone living alone who was 65 years of age or older. The average household size was 2.09 and the average family size was 2.53.

In the township the population was spread out, with 15.5% under the age of 18, 4.9% from 18 to 24, 22.3% from 25 to 44, 33.6% from 45 to 64, and 23.8% who were 65 years of age or older. The median age was 49 years. For every 100 females, there were 99.6 males. For every 100 females age 18 and over, there were 102.6 males.

The median income for a household in the township was $21,250, and the median income for a family was $25,000. Males had a median income of $30,000 versus $17,500 for females. The per capita income for the township was $15,912. About 18.3% of families and 19.3% of the population were below the poverty line, including 36.5% of those under age 18 and 15.5% of those age 65 or over.

== Education ==
The township is served entirely by Harrison Community Schools to the southeast in the city of Harrison.
