= Hayes Township, Clare County, Michigan =

Hayes Township, Michigan
- Civil township
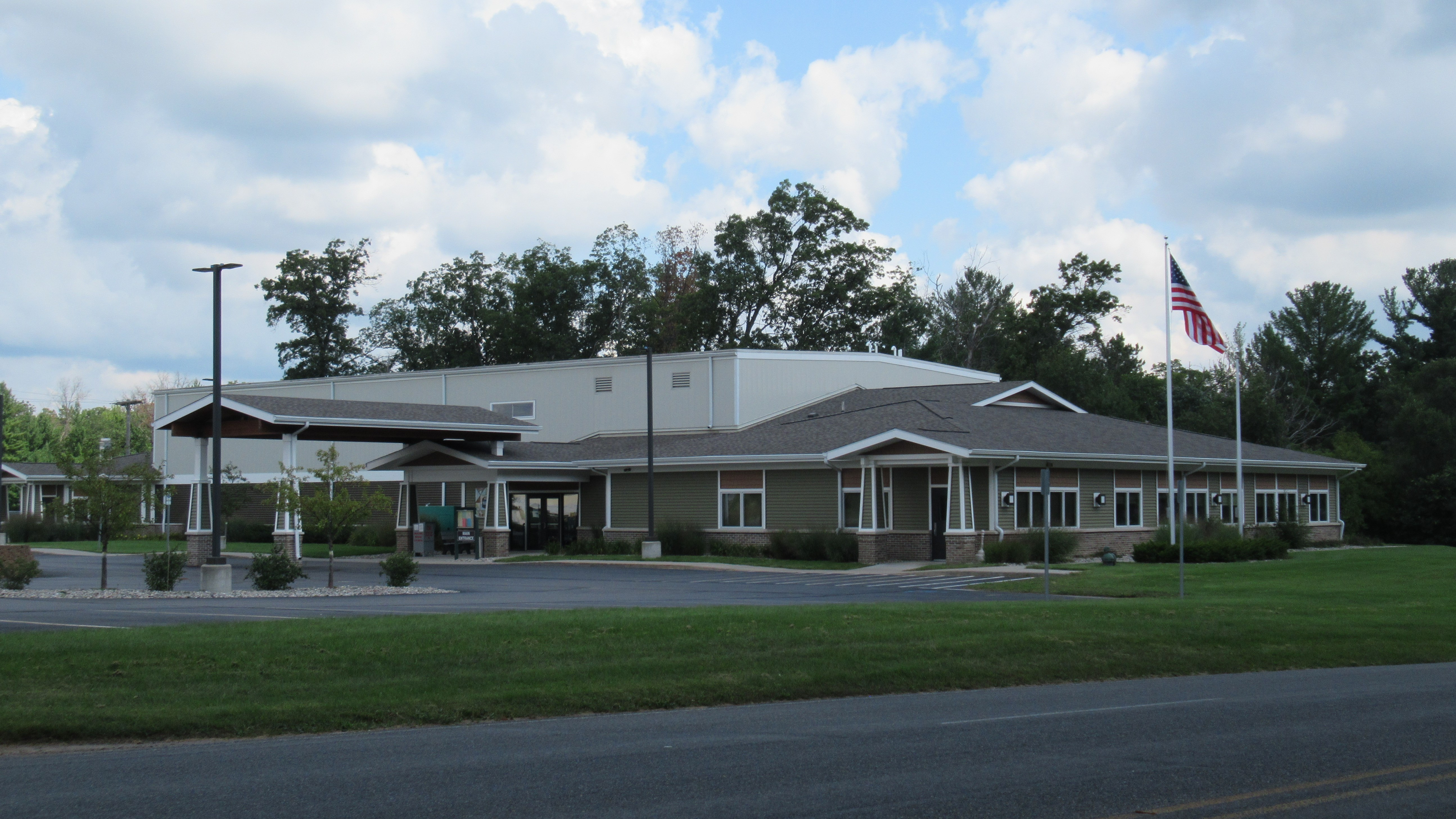
- Hayes Township Hall

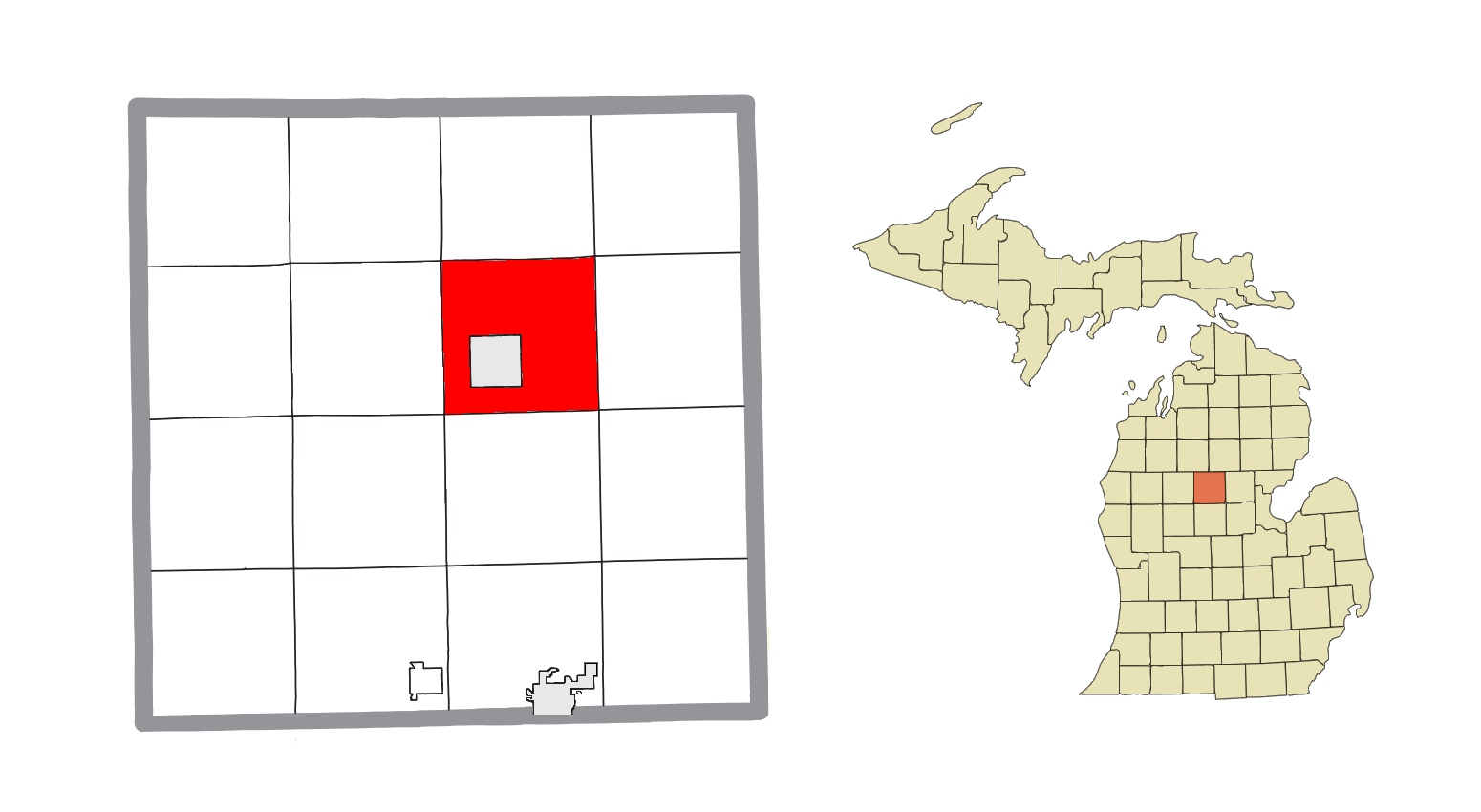
- Location within Clare County

- Location within the state of Michigan Location within the United States
- Coordinates: 44°01′49″N 84°47′12″W
- Country: United States
- State: Michigan
- County: Clare
- Established: 1877

Government
  - Supervisor: Rick Jones
  - Clerk: Debra Hoyt

Area
  - Total: 32.17 sq mi (83.32 km^{2})
  - Land: 31.28 sq mi (81.01 km^{2})
  - Water: 0.89 sq mi (2.31 km^{2})
- Elevation: 1,152 ft (351 m)

Population (2020)
  - Total: 4,642
  - Density: 148.4/sq mi (57.3/km^{2})
- Time zone: UTC-5 (Eastern (EST))
  - Summer (DST): UTC-4 (EDT)
- ZIP code(s): 48625 (Harrison)
- Area code: 989
- FIPS code: 26-37340
- GNIS feature ID: 1626454
- Website: Official website

Hayes Township is a civil township of Clare County in the U.S. state of Michigan. The population was 4,642 at the 2020 census.

== Communities ==
- Airport Forest is an unincorporated community just east of Clare County Airport in the northwest part of the township at 44°03′23″N 84°48′06″W
- Allendale is an unincorporated community southeast of Harrison at 44°00′19″N 84°47′05″W
- Ash Acres is an unincorporated community just north of Harrison at 44°02′16″N 84°48′43″W
- Piney Woods is an unincorporated community near the northern border of the township at 44°04′24″N 84°48′30″W

== Geography ==
According to the U.S. Census Bureau, the township has a total area of 32.17 square miles (83.32 km^{2}), of which 31.28 square miles (81.01 km^{2}) is land and 0.89 square miles (2.31 km^{2}) (2.77%) is water.

The township includes numerous lakes, including portions of Budd Lake and Little Long Lake, as well as Arnold Lake, Caner Lakes, Cranberry Lake, Deer Lake, McWatty Lake, Sutherland Lake, and Townline Lake.

=== Major highways ===
- US 127 runs south–north through the center of the township.
- Bus. US 127 is a business route of US 127 that runs through the township and the city of Harrison.
- M-61 runs east–west through the southern portion of the township.

== Demographics ==
As of the census of 2000, there were 4,916 people, 2,014 households, and 1,391 families residing in the township. The population density was 156.3 inhabitants per square mile (60.3/km^{2}). There were 3,898 housing units at an average density of 123.9 per square mile (47.8/km^{2}). The racial makeup of the township was 97.36% White, 0.12% African American, 0.79% Native American, 0.18% Asian, 0.02% Pacific Islander, 0.53% from other races, and 1.00% from two or more races. Hispanic or Latino of any race were 1.40% of the population.

There were 2,014 households, out of which 28.7% had children under the age of 18 living with them, 53.7% were married couples living together, 10.9% had a female householder with no husband present, and 30.9% were non-families. 25.4% of all households were made up of individuals, and 11.0% had someone living alone who was 65 years of age or older. The average household size was 2.44 and the average family size was 2.87.

In the township the population was spread out, with 25.5% under the age of 18, 6.2% from 18 to 24, 25.8% from 25 to 44, 26.1% from 45 to 64, and 16.3% who were 65 years of age or older. The median age was 39 years. For every 100 females, there were 99.3 males. For every 100 females age 18 and over, there were 97.5 males.

The median income for a household in the township was $26,495, and the median income for a family was $31,343. Males had a median income of $29,755 versus $20,698 for females. The per capita income for the township was $14,394. About 16.7% of families and 20.3% of the population were below the poverty line, including 29.1% of those under age 18 and 10.4% of those age 65 or over.

== Education ==
The township is served entirely by Harrison Community Schools in the city of Harrison.
