= Wise Township, Michigan =

- Civil township
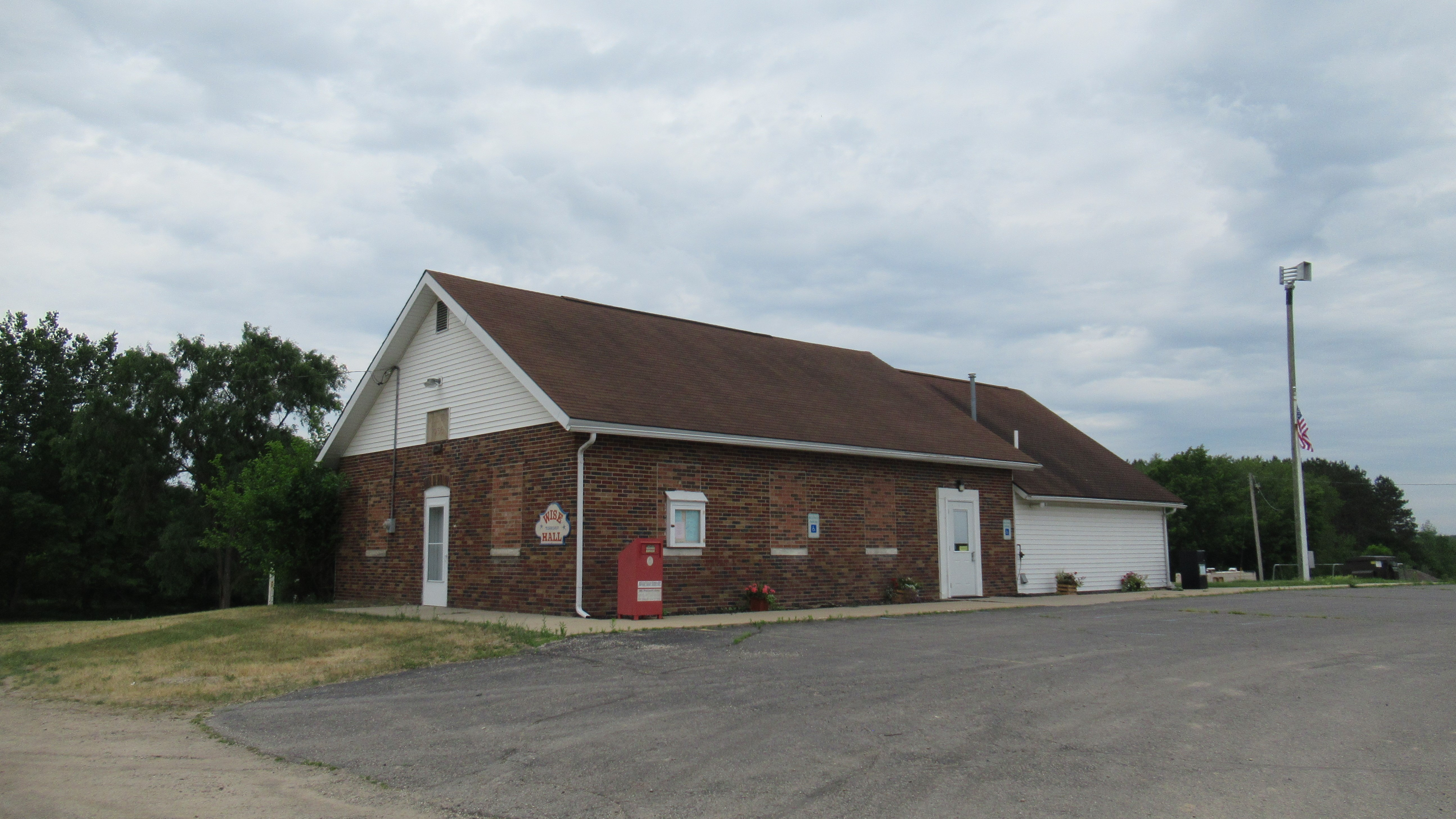
- Wise Township Hall in Loomis

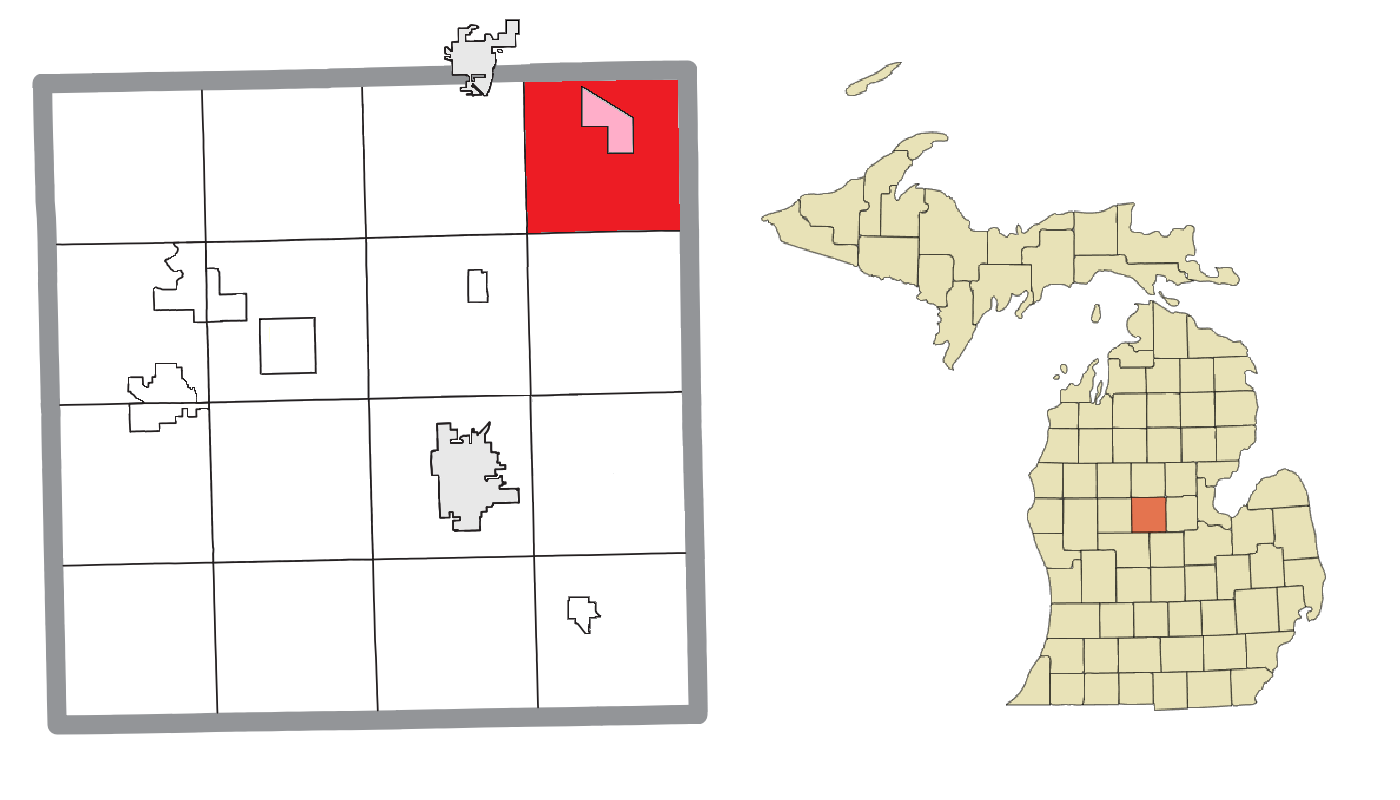
- Location within Isabella County (red) and the administered CDP of Loomis (pink)

- Location within the state of Michigan Location within the United States
- Coordinates: 43°46′18″N 84°40′29″W
- Country: United States
- State: Michigan
- County: Isabella
- Established: 1872

Government
  - Supervisor: Robert Moore
  - Clerk: Doris Methner

Area
  - Total: 36.59 sq mi (94.77 km^{2})
  - Land: 36.50 sq mi (94.53 km^{2})
  - Water: 0.089 sq mi (0.23 km^{2})
- Elevation: 764 ft (233 m)

Population (2020)
  - Total: 1,355
  - Density: 37.1/sq mi (14.3/km^{2})
- Time zone: UTC-5 (Eastern (EST))
  - Summer (DST): UTC-4 (EDT)
- ZIP code(s): 48617 (Clare); 48618 (Coleman); 48878 (Rosebush)
- Area code: 989
- FIPS code: 26-88040
- GNIS feature ID: 1627283
- Website: Official website

Wise Township is a civil township of Isabella County in the U.S. state of Michigan. The population was 1,355 at the 2020 census.

== History ==
Wise Township was established on January 24, 1872. It was named after George Wise, who was one of the first settlers to the area in the community of Loomis. Originally, Wise Township occupied two 36-square-mile survey townships in the northeast corner of Isabella County. The original boundaries of the township can be seen on an 1873 county map. The southern half of Wise Township was set aside as Denver Township in 1876.

== Geography ==
According to the U.S. Census Bureau, the township has a total area of 36.59 square miles (94.77 km^{2}), of which 36.50 square miles (94.53 km^{2}) is land and 0.09 square miles (0.23 km^{2}) (0.25%) is water.

The Pere Marquette Rail-Trail runs through the township. The entire township is within the boundaries of the Isabella Indian Reservation.

=== Major highways ===
- US 10 runs east–west along the northern portion of the city.
- Bus. US 10 is a business loop that enters very briefly in the northwest corner of the township and connects to US 10.

== Demographics ==
As of the census of 2000, there were 1,301 people, 464 households, and 360 families residing in the township. The population density was 35.5 inhabitants per square mile (13.7/km^{2}). There were 517 housing units at an average density of 14.1 per square mile (5.4/km^{2}). The racial makeup of the township was 93.62% White, 0.08% African American, 4.38% Native American, 0.23% Asian, 0.31% from other races, and 1.38% from two or more races. Hispanic or Latino of any race were 1.54% of the population.

There were 464 households, out of which 37.1% had children under the age of 18 living with them, 62.3% were married couples living together, 9.1% had a female householder with no husband present, and 22.4% were non-families. 18.1% of all households were made up of individuals, and 6.3% had someone living alone who was 65 years of age or older. The average household size was 2.80 and the average family size was 3.17.

In the township the population was spread out, with 29.6% under the age of 18, 7.8% from 18 to 24, 29.3% from 25 to 44, 22.0% from 45 to 64, and 11.3% who were 65 years of age or older. The median age was 35 years. For every 100 females, there were 99.8 males. For every 100 females age 18 and over, there were 104.0 males.

The median income for a household in the township was $41,333, and the median income for a family was $45,208. Males had a median income of $32,500 versus $21,111 for females. The per capita income for the township was $16,346. About 5.5% of families and 7.8% of the population were below the poverty line, including 8.3% of those under age 18 and 13.1% of those age 65 or over.

== Education ==
Wise Township is served by three separate public school districts. The northern portion of the township is served by Clare Public Schools to the northwest in the city of Clare. The southeast portion of the township is served by Coleman Community School District to the west in the city of Coleman in Midland County. A small portion of the southwest corner of the township is served by Mount Pleasant Public Schools much further to the south in the city of Mount Pleasant.
