= U.S. Route 10 in Michigan =

U.S. Highway in Michigan

US Highway 10
- US 10 highlighted in red, the ferry connection in blue

Route information
- Maintained by MDOT
- Length: 139.656 mi (224.755 km)
- Existed: November 11, 1926–present
- Tourist routes: Lake Michigan Circle Tour and Spur; West Michigan Pike Pure Michigan Byway

Major junctions
- West end: SS Badger at Ludington
- US 31 near Ludington; US 131 near Reed City; M-115 near Farwell; US 127 near Clare; M-47 near Midland
- East end: I-75 / US 23 / M-25 / BS I-75 in Bay City

Location
- Country: United States
- State: Michigan
- Counties: Mason, Lake, Osceola, Clare, Isabella, Midland, Bay

Highway system
- United States Numbered Highway System; List; Special; Divided; Michigan State Trunkline Highway System; Interstate; US; State; Byways
← M-9	→ Bus. US 10

US Highway 10 (US 10) is a part of the United States Numbered Highway System that runs from West Fargo, North Dakota, to the Lower Peninsula of the US state of Michigan. The highway enters Michigan on SS Badger, which crosses Lake Michigan between Manitowoc, Wisconsin, and Ludington. As the highway crosses the state, it is a two-lane undivided highway between Ludington and Farwell and a freeway from Farwell east to the highway's terminus in Bay City. US 10 runs concurrently with US 127 in the Clare area along a section of freeway that includes a welcome center in the median. Outside of the Clare and Midland areas, US 10 runs through rural areas of West and Central Michigan in a section of the Manistee National Forest as well as farmfields.

As part of the original US Numbered Highway System, US 10 was first designated in Michigan in 1926. It replaced three state trunkline highways of the day: M-20, M-24, and M-10, running between Ludington on Lake Michigan and downtown Detroit. It also ran concurrently with US 23 between Saginaw and Flint. The highway has been realigned several times during the construction of Interstate 75 (I-75) in southeast Michigan, even being temporarily designated "TO I-75" to connect segments of the I-75 freeway. The US 10 freeway between Clare and Midland was opened in the early 1960s. The Michigan Department of Transportation (MDOT) truncated the highway to Bay City in 1986, removing it from I-75 and the Lodge Freeway.

== Route description ==
Through the Lower Peninsula, US 10 is both an undivided highway and a freeway maintained by MDOT. The entire 140-mile (230 km) length has been listed on the National Highway System, a network of roads important to the country's economy, defense, and mobility. US 10 is also one of only two highways in the state that utilizes a car ferry, the other being M-134 in the Upper Peninsula.

=== Undivided highway ===
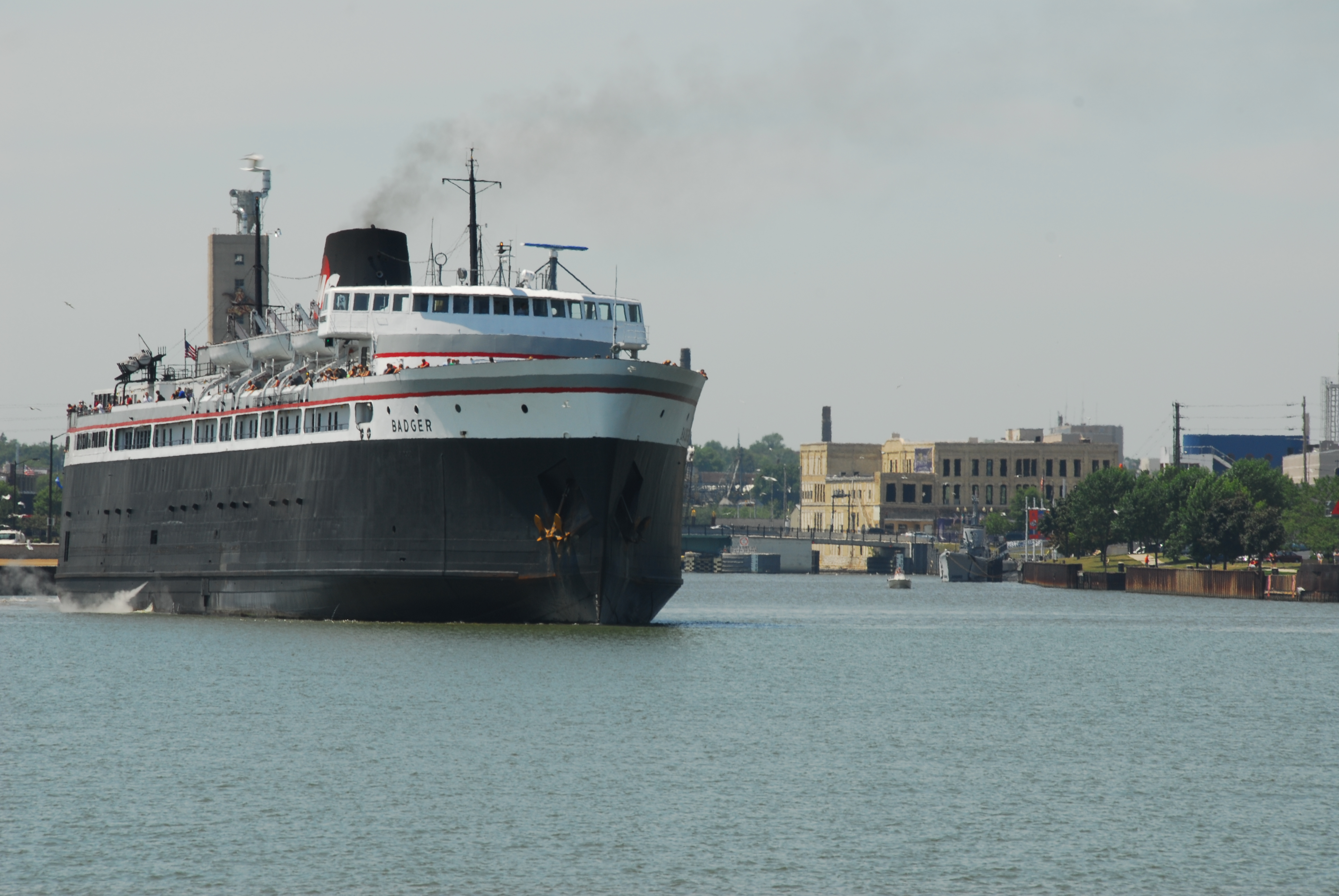
SS Badger connects the Wisconsin and Michigan segments of US 10

US 10 enters the state after it crosses Lake Michigan from Manitowoc, Wisconsin, to Ludington. Traffic is carried across the lake during the summer months on SS Badger, a privately owned car ferry. Heading eastward from the ferry, the highway runs along Pere Marquette Lake and then northward through a light industrial area along James Street in Ludington. At the intersection with Ludington Avenue in the downtown business area, the trunkline turns to the east. US 10 runs through commercial and residential areas on its course out of town. Near Mason County Airport, the highway intersects the northern end of Business US 31 (Bus. US 31; Pere Marquette Highway). About a mile and a half (2.4 km) east of that intersection, US 10 meets the interchange that marks the northern end of the US 31 freeway in the state. From here to Scottville, the two highways run concurrently together through a mix of rural fields and forests. On the west side of town, US 31 turns northward along the Scottville Bypass, and US 10 continues through the middle of town on State Street. The road heads eastward roughly parallel to the Pere Marquette River. Near Custer, US 10 crosses into the Manistee National Forest.

The trunkline continues eastward through the forest passing north of the community of Walhalla. At Branch, it crosses out of Mason County and enters Lake County, jogging to the southeast through town. South of Long Lake, the roadway returns to a due easterly course. North of Baldwin, US 10 turns southerly and merges with M-37. The two highways run together for about three miles (4.8 km) into town on Pine Street before separating. US 10 follows Washington Street easterly and exits town. The roadway passes near several small lakes near Idlewild and turns southeasterly into Chase. The highway exits the Manistee National Forest and runs through farm fields as it continues across the county line into Osceola County.

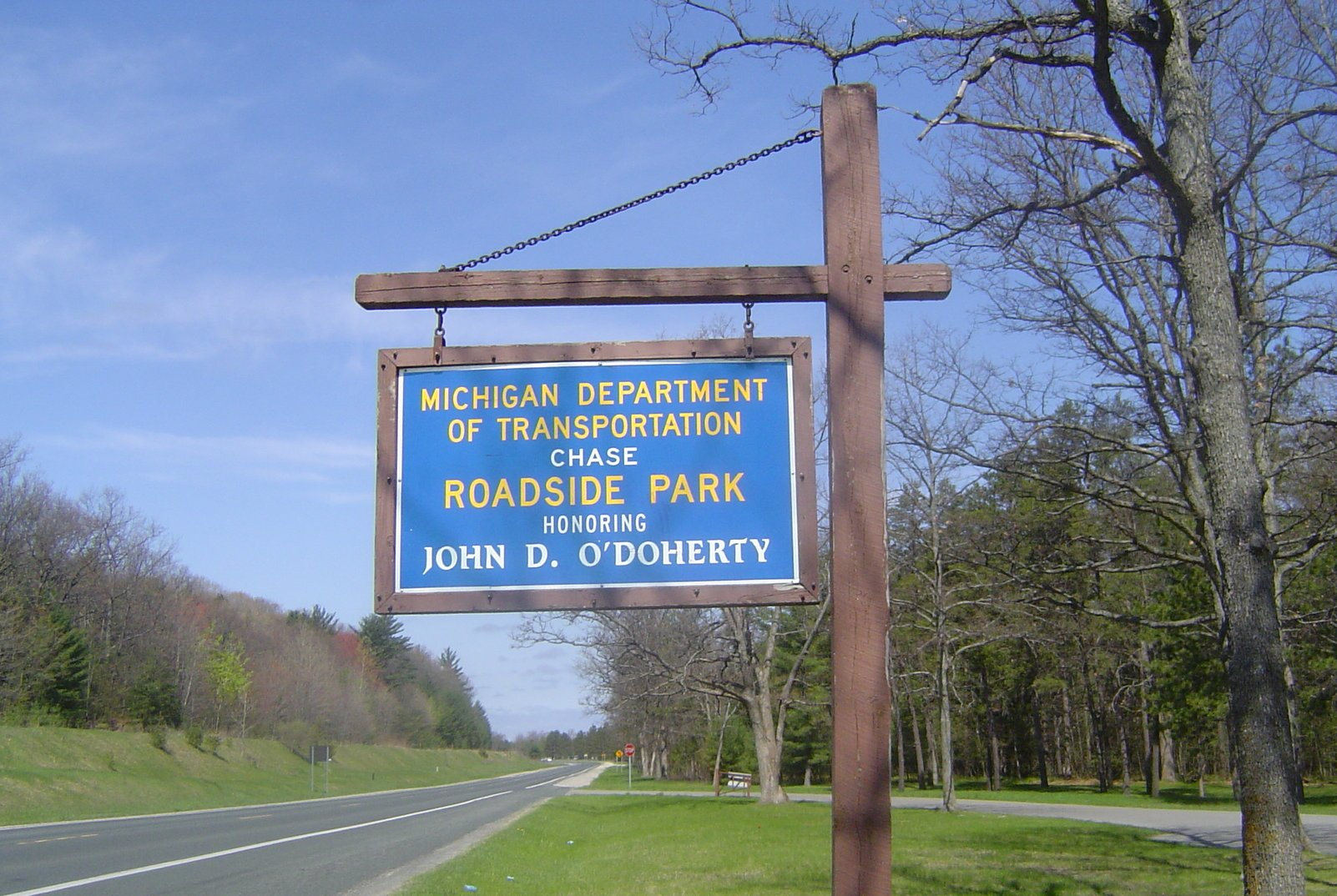
Roadside park east of Baldwin

Northwest of Reed City, US 10 meets the US 131 freeway before curving around the north side of town. The highway passes to the south of Nartron Field near the intersection with Bus. US 10. The highway crosses Fred Meijer White Pine Trail State Park, a rail trail that runs north through the area. US 10 continues east around the north side of town and runs parallel to the Pere Marquette State Trail, an east–west rail trail that follows the Ludington Division of the Pere Marquette Railway. The highway intersects the business loop on the east side of town and exits Reed City. US 10 continues east and northeasterly though rural fields in Osceola County. The highway passes to the north of Evart Municipal Airport and enters the city of Evart. It runs along 7th Street through downtown before and crossing the Muskegon River and exiting the city. The trunkline runs parallel to the rail trail through rural country side to north of the small community of Sears before turning to the southeast. US 10 passes between Big Mud, Big Cranberry, and Mystic lakes as it crosses into Clare County. The highway continues to the east, and, near Farwell, it transitions to a full freeway.

=== Freeway routing ===
Immediately after the traffic lanes spread apart to form the separate carriageways of the freeway, US 10 has an interchange with M-115. There is another interchange near Lake Thirteen for Old State Avenue that provides access to Farwell. About five miles (8.0 km) east of here, US 10 meets US 127 north of Clare. These two freeways merge and run south toward Clare, using the mileposting and exit numbering of US 127 along the concurrency. Near a curve to the southeast, there is an MDOT Welcome Center located in the median between the two halves of the freeway. Past this facility is an interchange that connects to Bus. US 127/Bus. US 10 which provides access to downtown Clare. The freeway turns to the south between Lake Shamrock and Clare Municipal Airport. US 10 separates from US 127 at a partial interchange south of the airport using a left exit southbound to continue on eastbound US 10. The connections for westbound US 10 to southbound US 127 or northbound US 127 to eastbound US 10 are made using the business routes through downtown.

The interchange that marks the southern end of the US 127/US 10 concurrency is also the place where US 10 crosses into the northeastern corner of Isabella County. About three miles (4.8 km) east of there, US 10 has its partial interchange with the eastern end of the Clare business loop. The freeway continues southeasterly now parallel to the Pere Marquette Rail-Trail, another former rail line of the Pere Marquette Railway. US 10 bypasses the community of Loomis to the north before crossing into Midland County near Coleman. The landscape through this area is dominated by farms. US 10 bypasses North Bradley connecting with an interchange that marks the southern terminus of M-18. Further along, the freeway crosses the southern end of Sanford Lake on a set of bridges; on the eastern shore, there is an interchange with M-30 (Meridian Road) that connects to Sanford.

After crossing the lake, the freeway runs southeasterly roughly parallel to the Tittabawassee River for about three miles (4.8 km) until the interchange with Stark Road. US 10 turns to run due east between Airport Road to the north and Wackerly Street to the south. The freeway passes Jack Barstow Municipal Airport as it enters Midland. At the interchange with Eastman Avenue, the city's business loop departs to connect to downtown, and the freeway passes near Midland Mall and the Midland County Fairgrounds. Two miles (3.2 km) further east, US 10 turns to the southeast, bordered by residential subdivisions of the city of Midland to its south and vacant fields to its north. There is a partial interchange that straddles the Midland–Bay county line that provides access to the eastern end of Bus. US 10/M-20, which is also a freeway on this side of town. Traffic exiting the business loop freeway is forced onto US 10 eastbound, and only westbound US 10 traffic and enter the westbound direction of Bus. US 10/M-20; the other connections are possible by using the adjoining Bay City Road interchange on US 10 and the Waldo Avenue interchange on the business loop.

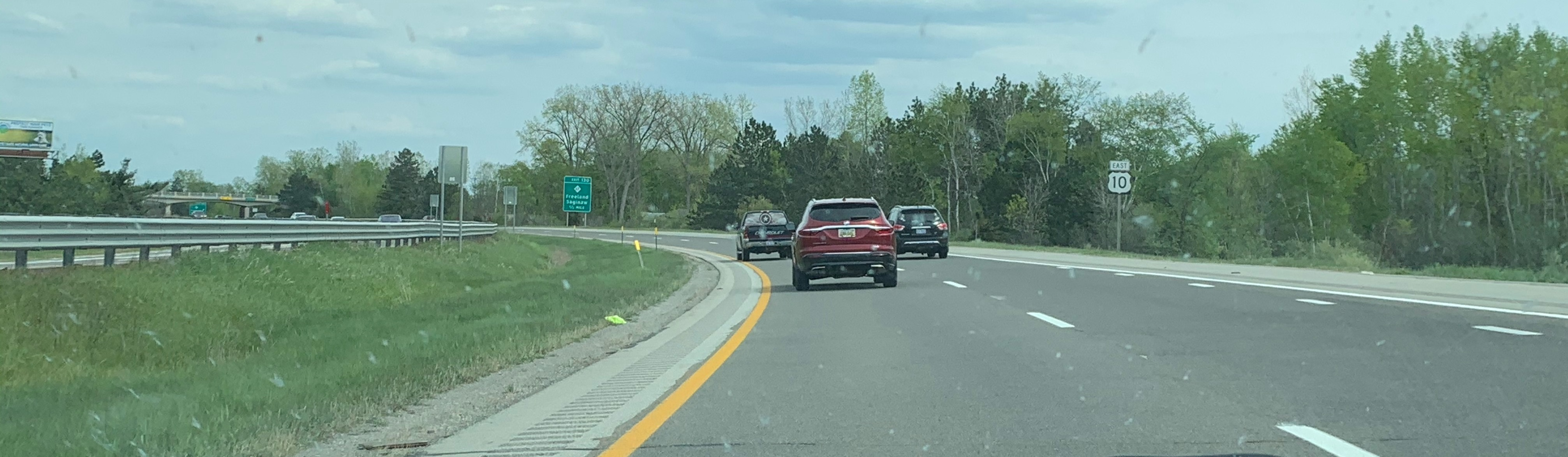
US 10 looking eastbound on the border of Midland and Bay counties

Past the Bay City Road interchange, US 10 continues due east through Bay County. It intersects the northern end of the M-47 freeway. Further east, there are a pair of interchanges for Auburn as the freeway runs through a landscape that is a mix of suburban residential subdivisions and farmfields. The freeway is paralleled to the south by segments of Fisher Road in spots; about a half mile (0.80 km) north is Midland Road. There is one last interchange for Mackinaw Road along the freeway before US 10 ends at the cloverleaf interchange with I-75/US 23 and M-25 on the west side of Bay City. This junction is both the eastern terminus of US 10 both in the state of Michigan and nationally.

== History ==
Historical US 10 route markers

1926 design

1948 design

The first state trunkline highways designated along the original path of US 10 were M-20, M-24, and M-10 as far back as 1919. When the US Numbered Highway System was announced on November 11, 1926, US 10 replaced these designations. The highway started in Ludington and ran east replacing M-20 to Midland, M-24 to Saginaw, and M-10 to Detroit. Between Saginaw and Flint, US 10 and US 23 were routed concurrently.

Two changes were made in the routing of US 10 by 1929. As shown on the maps of the time, US 10 was rerouted to bypass Flint. The former routing through the city was redesignated M-10. A second change moved the highway to its present routing west of Baldwin to the Lake–Mason county line. A bypass of downtown Midland was opened in 1934. The previous routing through town was initially renumbered US 10A. A rerouting project in Osceola County started in 1936. By the end of the year, a new roadway was opened between Sears and M-66. Until the second segment of the project was completed two years later, US 10 was routed concurrently with M-66. When the new routing between M-66 and Lake in Clare County was opened, that concurrency was eliminated and all the previous routings were transferred to local control.

By 1942, the M-10 designation in Flint was renumbered Bus. US 10, eliminating the second M-10 designation from the maps. The last segments of US 10 that were gravel-surfaced were paved by 1948. The last section paved was between Chase and Reed City.

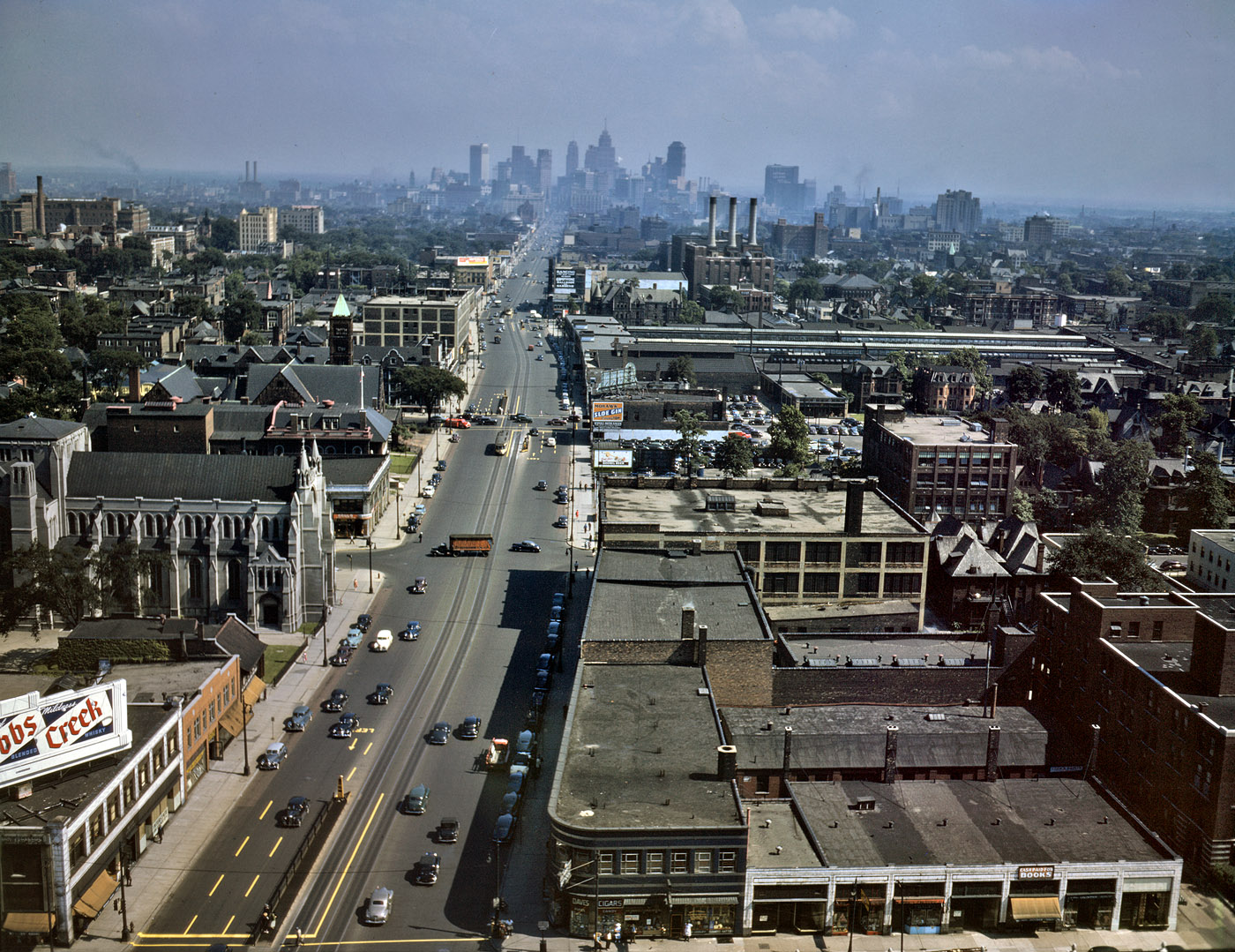
Woodward Avenue in Detroit in 1942, then part of US 10

A bypass of Saginaw was completed by 1953. This new roadway was designated as US 23 alone. The highway through downtown Saginaw was numbered US 10/Bus. US 23. The Fenton–Clio Expressway was completed in 1957 from Birch Run past Flint. The new expressway was numbered US 23, leaving the former highway through Flint as just US 10. A bypass of Reed City opened by 1960; the former routing was renumbered Bus. US 10.

Many changes were made in 1960 to the routing of US 10. A new freeway opened for I-75/US 10/US 23 between M-13 northeast of Saginaw and the M-20 freeway in Bay City. US 10 replaced the M-20 designation on the freeway between Midland and Bay City. M-47 replaced US 10 between Midland and Saginaw, and M-81 replaced US 10 in the city of Saginaw. An addition segment of US 10 between Saginaw and Bridgeport was renumbered BL I-75. The US 10A designation previously in use in Midland was changed to Bus. US 10 at this time as well.

Additional freeway was built in 1961, relocating US 10/US 23 between Birch Run and M-13 to the new I-75. The freeway between Midland and the US 27 freeway at Clare was completed in the same year. US 10 was signed as "TO I-75" to route traffic between the completed freeways at Bay City and Grayling by way of Clare. Changes made in the Pontiac area moved US 10 to the former routing of M-58. The former highway through town was redesignated as Bus. US 10. More I-75 freeway was completed in 1962 between Flint and Pontiac. US 10 was transferred to the new freeway while the old routing was renumbered M-54. The former Bus. US 10 became Bus. M-54. These changes made all of US 10 from Clare east to Clarkston freeway.

Until 1970, US 10 followed Woodward Avenue between Detroit and Pontiac. That year, Woodward Avenue was redesignated M-1 and US 10 was moved to the Lodge Freeway and Telegraph Road. The TO I-75 designation was removed in 1973 when the last segments of I-75 were completed between West Branch and Roscommon. Farwell and Clare were bypassed on their northern side in 1975 by a new freeway section of US 10/M-115. The previous routing was partially numbered Bus. US 10 while the remainder was unsigned.

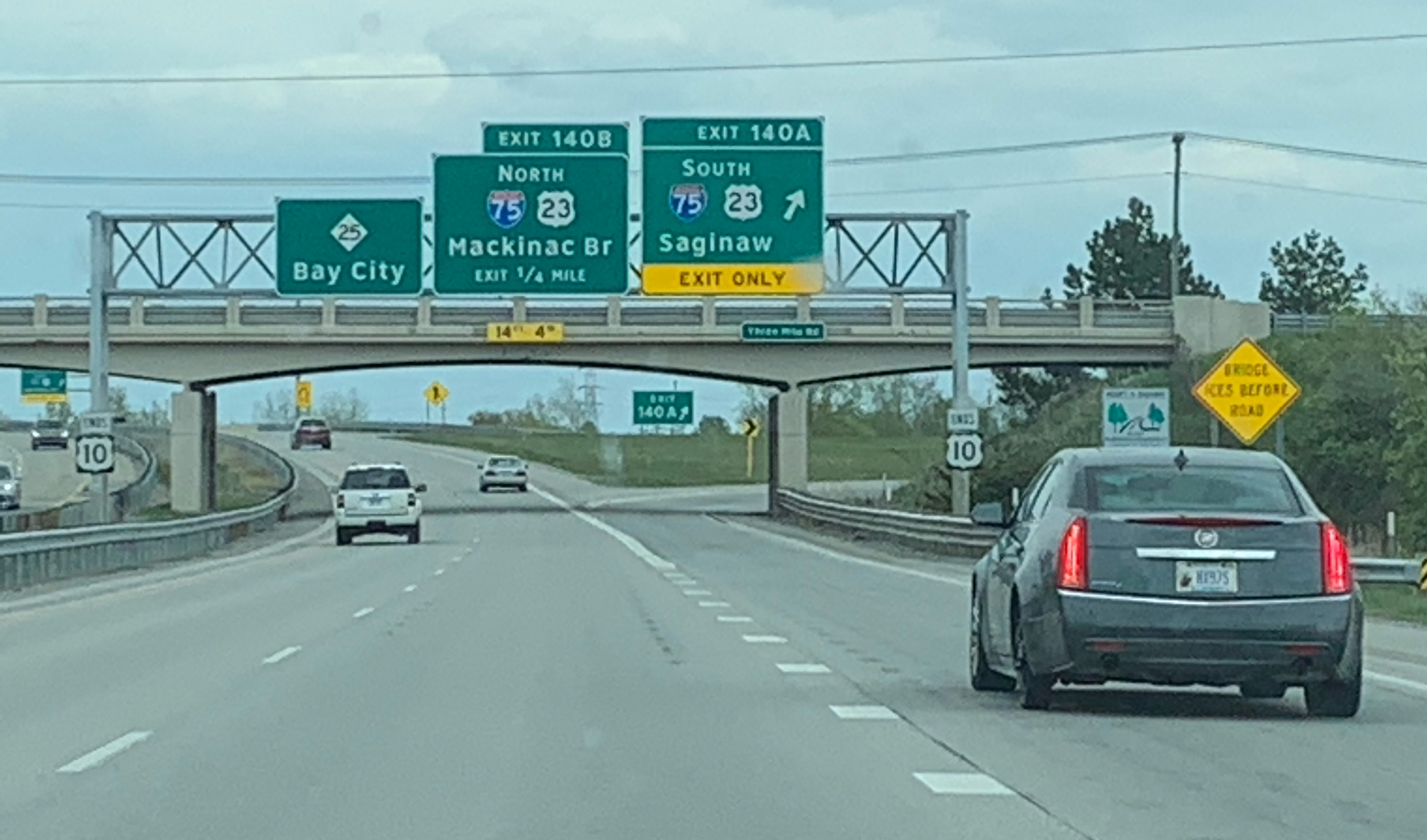
The eastern terminus of US 10 in Monitor Township, looking east. From this point onward, the road continues as M-25.

MDOT truncated the US 10 designation from Detroit to Bay City in 1986. The US 10 designation was removed from its concurrencies with I-75 and US 23. The section along Dixie Highway and Telegraph Road between Pontiac and Southfield was redesignated as an extension of US 24. The Lodge Freeway was given the M-10 designation and Bus. US 10 in Pontiac was renumbered as Bus. US 24. M-115 was transferred off the US 10 freeway in the Clare area in 1989 back to its previous routing before the 1975 changes. The last change made to the routing of the highway came in 1998 in Ludington. Reconfiguration of the carferry docks and parking lot moved US 10 along James Street instead of William Street. The three blocks of Ludington Avenue affected by the change were given the M-116 designation. At their Spring Meeting in 2015, the American Association of State Highway and Transportation Officials official extended US 10 to include the route of SS Badger between Ludington and Manitowoc.

In 2016, the section of US 10 between the Bus. US 31 and US 31 junctions at Ludington was designated as part of the West Michigan Pike Pure Michigan Byway.

== Major intersections ==
County	Location	mi	km	Exit	Destinations	Notes
Lake Michigan		0.000	0.000		SS Badger	Car ferry to Manitowoc (tolled), connection to US 10 in Wisconsin
Mason	Ludington	0.581	0.935		M-116 north (Ludington Avenue) – Ludington State Park	Southern terminus of M-116
Mason	Pere Marquette Township	2.214	3.563		Bus. US 31 south to US 31	Northern terminus of Bus. US 31
Mason	Amber Township	3.749	6.033		US 31 south / LMCT – Muskegon	Western end of US 31 concurrency; western end of LMCT concurrency; exit 170 on US 31
Mason	Amber Township	8.361	13.456		US 31 north / LMCT – Manistee	Eastern end of US 31/LMCT concurrency
Lake	Webber Township	30.550	49.165		M-37 north – Traverse City	Northern end of M-37 concurrency
Lake	Baldwin	33.504	53.919		M-37 south – Grand Rapids	Southern end of M-37 concurrency
Osceola	Richmond Township	49.835– 49.858	80.202– 80.239		US 131 – Cadillac, Grand Rapids	Exit 153 on US 131
Osceola	Reed City	50.748	81.671		Bus. US 10 east (Chestnut Street)	Western terminus of Bus. US 10
Osceola	Reed City	51.963	83.626		Bus. US 10 west (Church Avenue)	Eastern terminus of Bus. US 10
Osceola	Sylvan Township	69.606	112.020		M-66 – Ionia, Lake City	
Clare	Surrey Township	81.790	131.628	Western end of freeway		
Clare	Surrey Township	82.487	132.750	82	M-115 – Cadillac, Farwell	
Clare	Surrey Township	84.923	136.670	85	Old State Avenue – Farwell, Lake George	
Clare	Grant Township	89.585	144.173	89	US 127 north – Mackinac Bridge	Northern end of US 127 concurrency; exit 162 on US 127
Clare	Grant Township	91.014– 91.505	146.473– 147.263	Michigan Welcome Center		
Clare	Clare	91.975	148.019	160	Bus. US 127 south / Bus. US 10 east – Clare	Exit number follows US 127; northern terminus of Bus. US 127; western terminus of Bus. US 10
Clare	Clare	93.479	150.440	158	US 127 south – Mount Pleasant, Lansing	Southern end of US 127 concurrency; eastbound exit and westbound entrance
Isabella	Wise Township	95.775	154.135	95	Bus. US 10 west – Clare	Westbound exit and eastbound entrance
Isabella	Loomis	98.320	158.231	98	Loomis	Connects to Loomis Road
Midland	Coleman	102.990	165.746	103	Coleman	Connects to Coleman Road
Midland	Warren–Edenville township line	108.801	175.098	109	M-18 north – Beaverton, Gladwin	Southern terminus of M-18
Midland	Sanford	114.432	184.160	114	West River Road	
Midland	Sanford	115.769	186.312	116	M-30 – West Branch, Sanford	
Midland	Midland	119.337	192.054	119	Stark Road	
Midland	Midland	122.488	197.125	122	Bus. US 10 east (Eastman Avenue) – Midland	Western terminus of Bus. US 10; indirect eastbound access via Wackerly Street
Midland	Midland	125.936	202.674	126	Waldo Avenue	Eastbound exit and westbound entrance
Midland–Bay county line	Midland	128.161	206.255	128	Bus. US 10 west / M-20 west – Downtown Midland	Westbound exit and eastbound entrance; eastern terminus of both Bus. US 10 and M-20
Bay	Midland	128.716	207.148	129	Bay City Road	Bay City Road becomes Midland Road immediately east of exit; converted from westbound exit and eastbound entrance to full interchange December 2000
Bay	Williams Township	130.061– 130.077	209.313– 209.339	130	M-47 south – Freeland, Saginaw	Northern terminus of M-47; Saginaw signed eastbound only
Bay	Auburn	132.577	213.362	132	Garfield Road – Auburn	Access to MBS International Airport; Auburn signed eastbound only
Bay	Auburn	133.568	214.957	134	9 Mile Road – Auburn	Westbound exit and eastbound entrance
Bay	Monitor Township	137.438	221.185	137	Mackinaw Road	
Bay	Monitor Township	139.599– 139.656	224.663– 224.755	140	I-75 / US 23 – Mackinac Bridge, Saginaw M-25 east (BS I-75) – Bay City	Eastern terminus of US 10; roadway continues east as M-25/BS I-75; signed as exits 140A (south) and 140B (north); exit 162 on I-75/US 23
1.000 mi = 1.609 km; 1.000 km = 0.621 mi: Concurrency terminus; Incomplete access; Tolled

== Business loops ==
There are currently three business loops of US 10 in the state of Michigan, and two that were previously designated. The three currently designated are in Reed City, Clare, and Midland. The business route that existed in Flint has been decommissioned while the one in Pontiac has been renumbered.

== See also ==
US Highway 10
Previous state: Wisconsin	Michigan	Next state: Terminus
