= Clare Downtown Historic District =

Historic district in Michigan, United States

- U.S. National Register of Historic Places
- U.S. Historic district
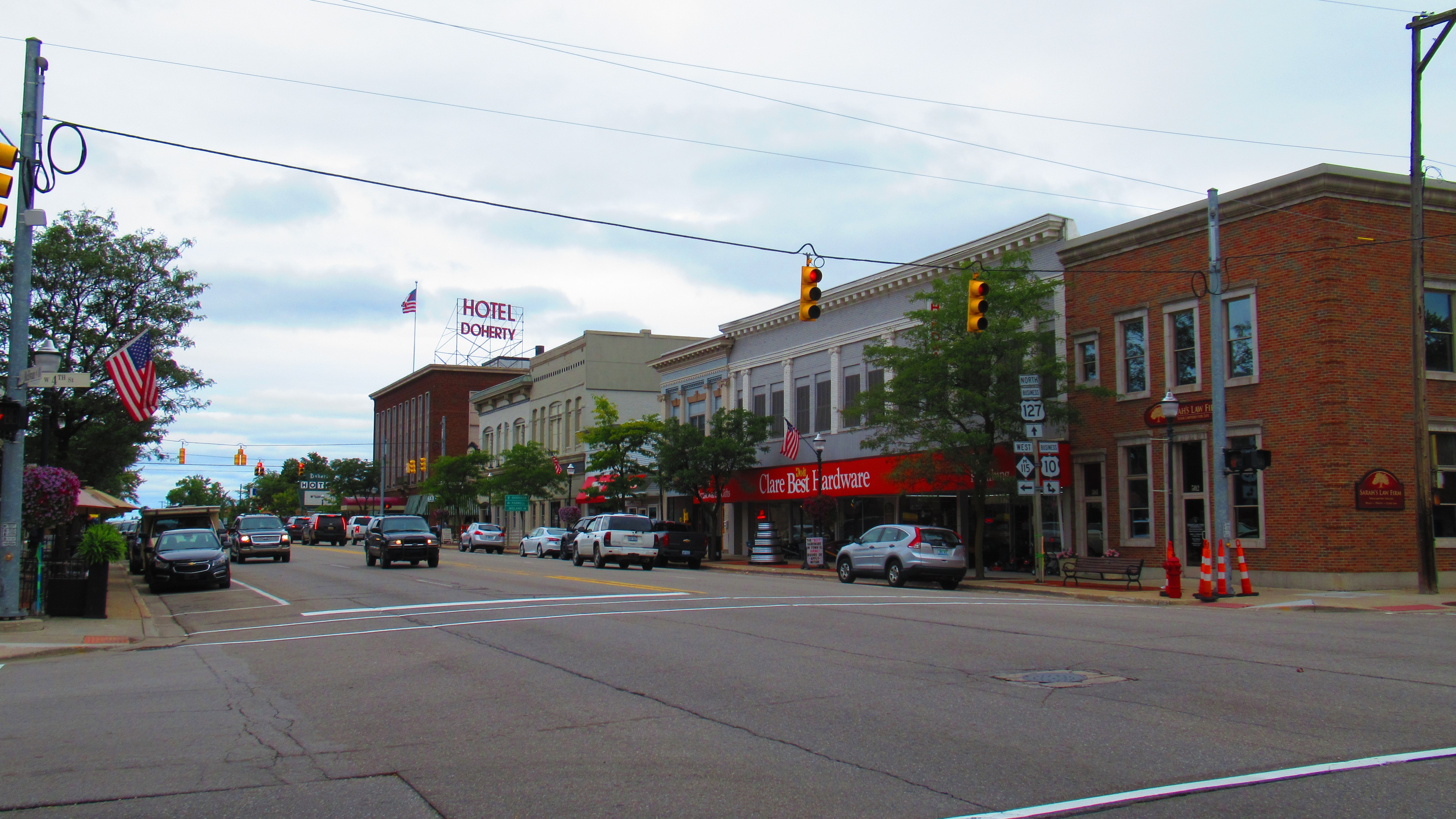
- Looking north along McEwan Street

- Location within Michigan Location within the United States
- Interactive map
- Location: 114-120 E. Fifth St., 102-202 W. Fifth St., 112-115 E. Fourth St., 112-124 W. Fourth St., 307, 321-622 N. McEwan, Clare, Michigan
- Coordinates: 43°49′9″N 84°46′6″W
- Architectural style: Neoclassical and Commercial Brick
- NRHP reference No.: 16000178
- Added to NRHP: April 19, 2016

The Clare Downtown Historic District is a collection of 51 buildings located along four blocks of North McEwan Street in Clare, Michigan, along with adjacent portions of East and West Fourth Street and East and West Fifth Street. Street addresses of the structures run from 307 to 622 North McEwan, 114-120 East Fifth Street, 102-202 West Fifth Street, 112-115 East Fourth Street, and 112-124 West Fourth Street. The district was listed on the National Register of Historic Places in 2016.

== History ==
In 1864, Bay City lumberman William McEwan purchased the acreage around the area that is now downtown Clare. In 1868, he established a logging camp just south of what is now the city, and began clearing timber. In 1870, the Flint and Pere Marquette Railroad extended their tracks through the area, crossing what was then known as the Isabella-Tobacco River State Road near McEwan's lumber camp. McEwen took this opportunity to plat out a city near the crossing, and by the end of 1870, a small collection of buildings had been erected in Clare, including boarding houses, a store, and a few private houses.

The commercial district grew rapidly in the 1870s. In 1878, Clare had 700 residents, over 30 commercial establishments, two churches, and more industrial employers. In 1881, an opera house opened, and in 1885 the first brick building in the city was constructed. Public water mains and telephone lines were soon installed, and bu 1891 there were nearly 1200 residents in Clare, and it was incorporated as a city. Electrical service was introduced in 1894, and a number of important commercial brick structures were built in the downtown in the 1890s, culminating in Clare's largest commercial building, Alfred Doherty's no longer extant six-storefront on McEwen.

In the early 1900s, two significant fires in 1904 and 1907 destroyed a number of buildings in the downtown area, most constructed of wood. However, the buildings were quickly replaced, and from that point on, all further construction was of brick. Additional smaller fires occurred throughout the rest of the 20th century, resulting in a steady trickle of new construction of individual buildings from the 1920s through until the 1990s. Further construction occurred in the 1930s along West Fifth Street, following the construction of the Clare City Hall Building. The downtown as a whole prospered until the 1960s, when the freeway bypassed the city. However, despite economic struggles, the downtown area has retained a substantial amount of business activity.

== Description ==
The Clare Downtown Historic District is located in the commercial center of the city, along four blocks of North McEwan Street with adjacent portions of East and West Fourth and Fifth Streets. There are 51 buildings in the district, along with two additional structures and two other sites. Construction dates of the buildings range from 1873 to 2000; most are two stories, but heights range from one to four stories. The buildings are predominantly Neoclassical and Commercial Brick, with some Late Victorian, Mid-century modern, and later 20th century architectural styles.

The southernmost portion of the district, on McEwen just south of the railroad tracks, includes a large elevator building. North of this, the heart of the district runs along McEwen between Third Street (where the railroad also crosses McEwen) and Sixth Street. The buildings along these three blocks are nearly all one- and two-story commercial buildings, standing side-by-side and fronting directly on the sidewalk. On the corner of McEwen and Fifth stands the Doherty Hotel, built in 1924, and the only four-story structure in the district. The original Doherty Hotel, along with its associated parking lot and modern addition, occupies the entire city block between Fifth and Sixth and between McEwen and Pine. North of the district, along McEwen, sits a large modern hospital complex.

The district extends in both directions along Fifth Street. To the east, it includes the 1882 Herrick House, and upright-and-wing house now converted to commercial purposes. To the west, the district extends to encompass the US Post Office, Clare City Hall, and Clare Congregational Church (the last being independently listed in the National Register). The district also extends west along Fourth Street to encompass a group of commercial buildings.

== Gallery ==
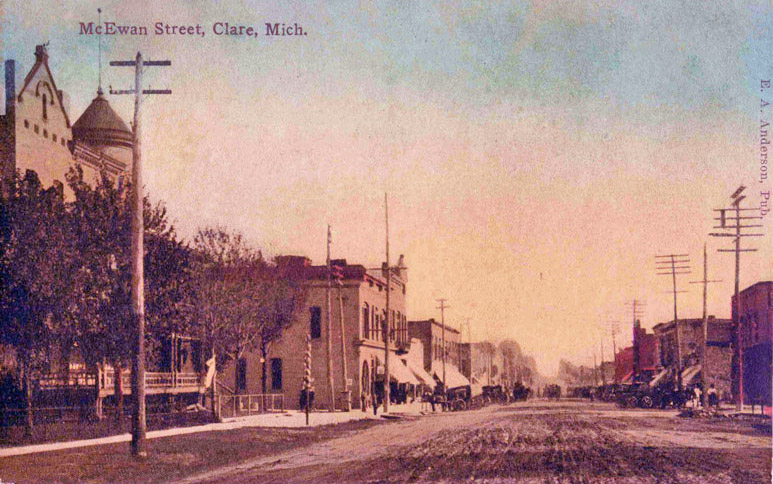
McEwan Street, looking south from the present location of the Doherty Hotel, c. 1909

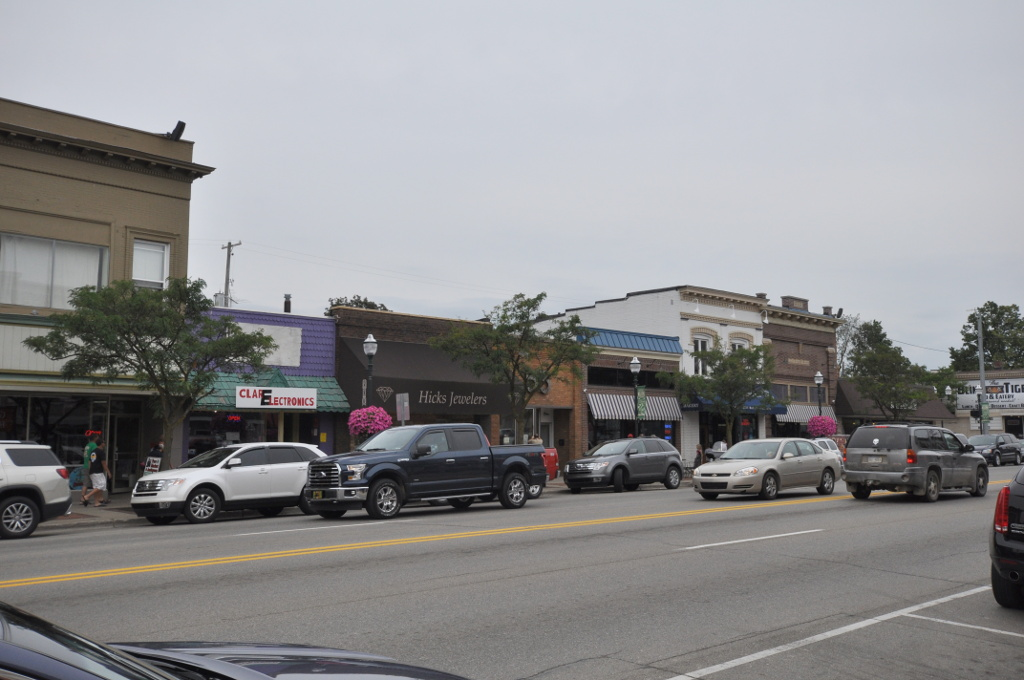
West side of McEwen, 2017

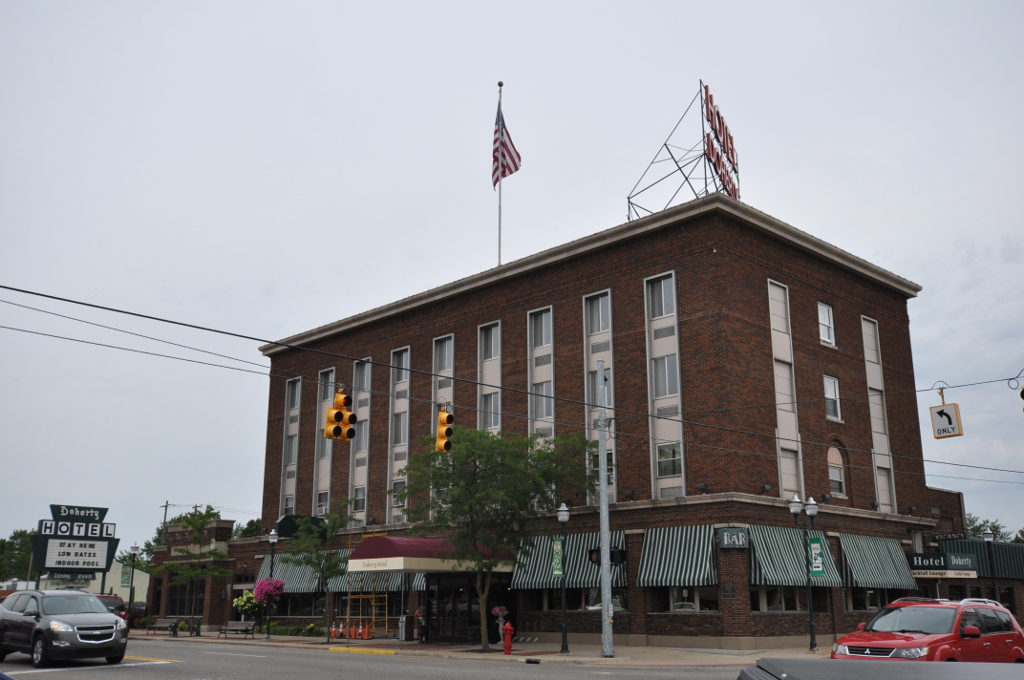
Doherty Hotel, 2017

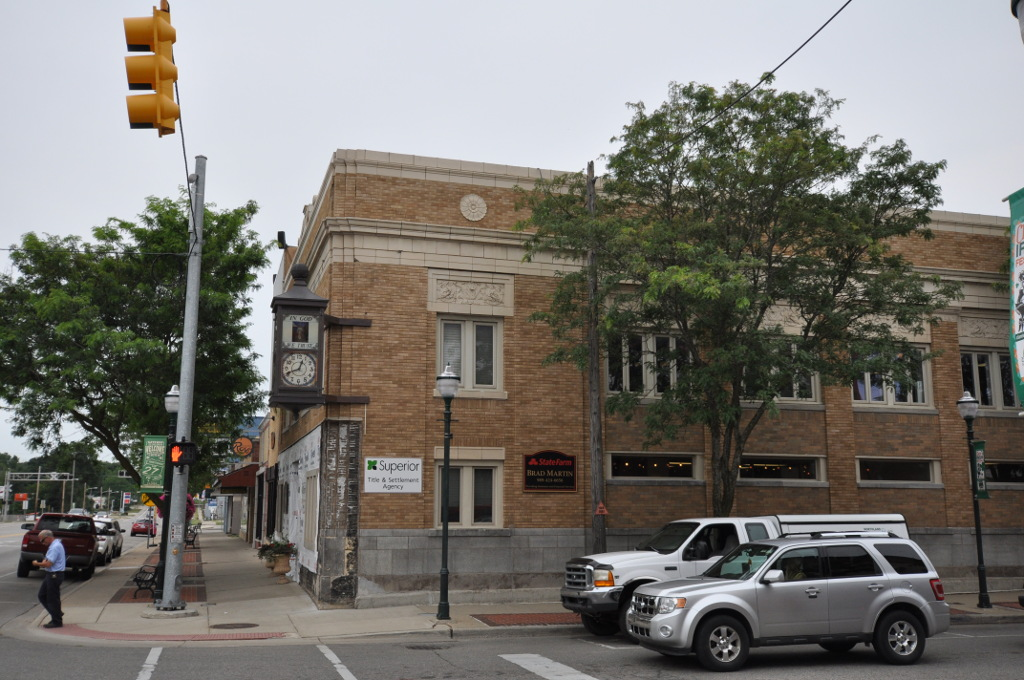
McEwan and Fourth, 2017

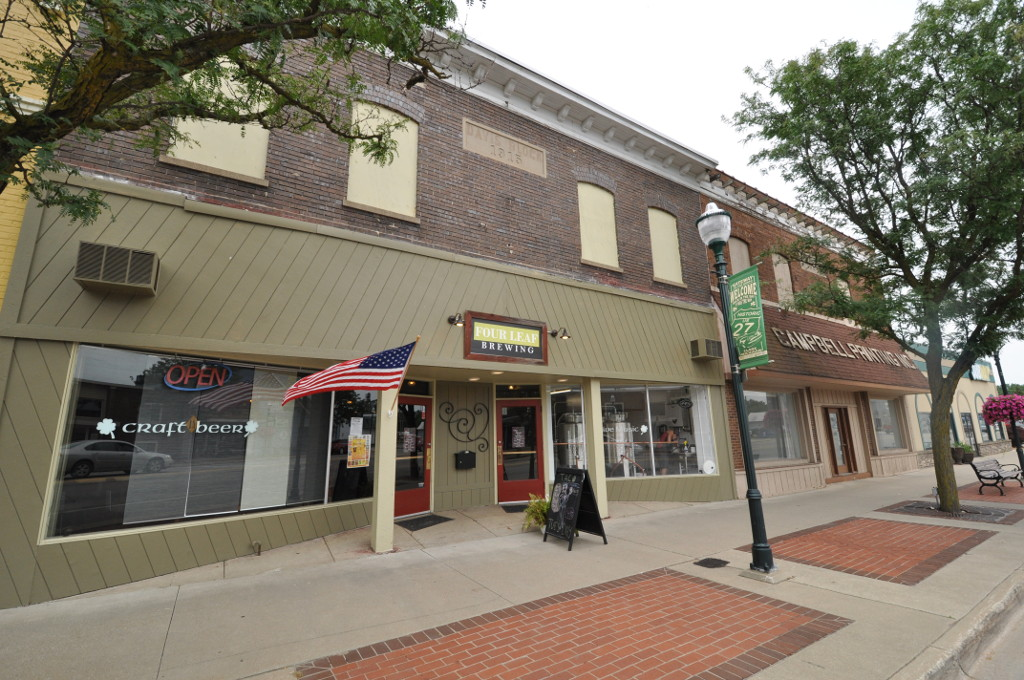
East Side of McEwan, 2017
