= Loomis, Michigan =

- Census-designated place (CDP) & unincorporated community
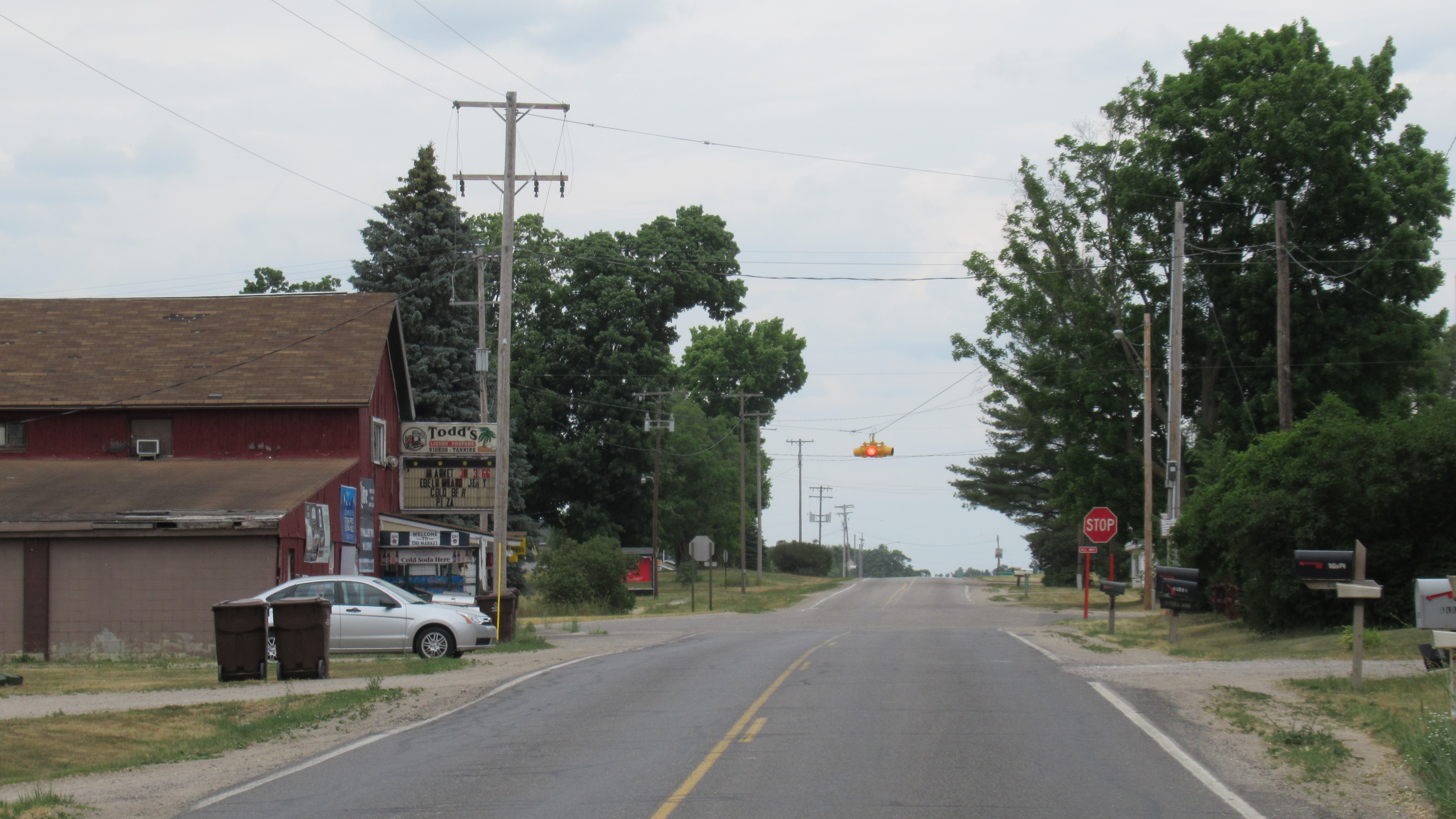
- Intersection of Saginaw and Loomis Road

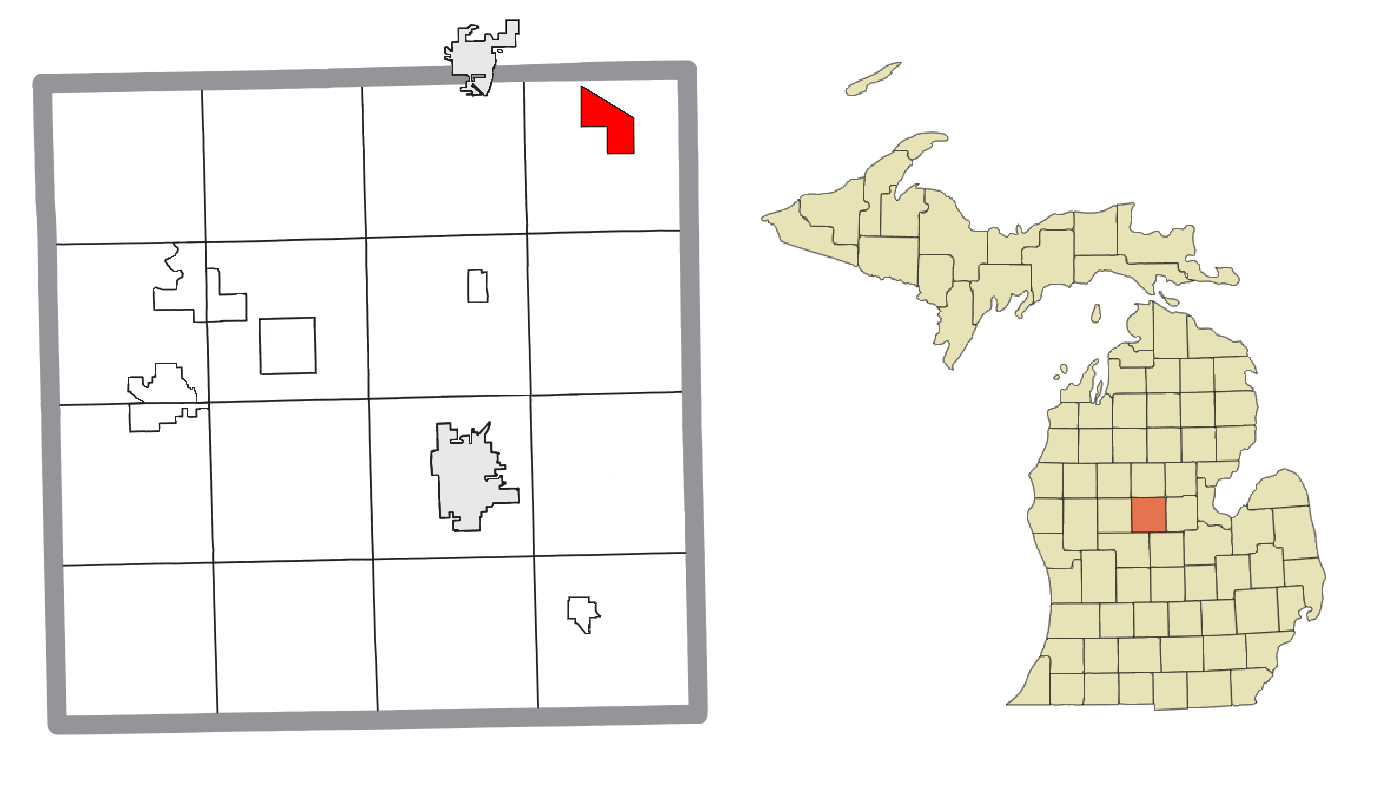
- Location within Isabella County

- Location within the state of Michigan Location within the United States
- Coordinates: 43°47′36″N 84°40′00″W
- Country: United States
- State: Michigan
- County: Isabella
- Township: Wise
- Settled: 1871

Area
  - Total: 2.82 sq mi (7.30 km^{2})
  - Land: 2.80 sq mi (7.25 km^{2})
  - Water: 0.019 sq mi (0.05 km^{2})
- Elevation: 805 ft (245 m)

Population (2020)
  - Total: 194
  - Density: 69.29/sq mi (26.75/km^{2})
- Time zone: UTC-5 (Eastern (EST))
  - Summer (DST): UTC-4 (EDT)
- ZIP code(s): 48617 (Clare)
- Area code: 989
- GNIS feature ID: 631028

Loomis is an unincorporated community and census-designated place (CDP) in Isabella County in the U.S. state of Michigan. The population of the CDP was 194 at the 2020 census. The community is located within Wise Township, and is also located within the Isabella Indian Reservation, home to the federally-recognized Saginaw Chippewa Tribal Nation.

== History ==
The community was first settled as early as 1871 by Erastus Loomis, George Wise, and E. F. Gould, who built a sawmill and a general store. The same year, it received a train depot along the Flint and Pere Marquette Railroad and also received a post office under the name Buchtel on May 1, 1871. Wise served as the first postmaster. The post office was renamed to Loomis on December 8, 1871. When the area was organized as a new township on January 24, 1872, it was named Wise Township. The community first appeared on an 1873 map of Isabella County, in which Wise Township then occupied two survey townships in the northeast portion of the county.

Located about 16.0 miles (25.7 km) north of Mount Pleasant, the community grew quickly. In 1877, Loomis recorded a population of around 350 and included several sawmills, general stores, churches, and two hotels. During the height of the lumber and railroad industry, the area population may have been as high as 800. The railway served the community until about 1960 when the lines were removed. With the expansion of U.S. Route 10 in the early 1960s, the highway bypassed Loomis to the north, which prevented any direct traffic to the dwindling community. In 1970, Loomis may have had as few as 15 families, a gas station, the market, and the town hall. The oldest structure in the community is Patrick Holden's hotel, which was one of the original structures when the community was settled in 1871. The structure remains and is now a market and antique shop.

At the 2010 census, Loomis was listed as a new census-designated place and recorded a population of 213. The Loomis post office is no longer in operation, and the community is served by the Clare 48617 ZIP Code.

== Geography ==
According to the U.S. Census Bureau, the Loomis CDP has a total area of 2.82 square miles (7.30 km^{2}), of which 2.80 square miles (7.25 km^{2}) is land and 0.02 square miles (0.05 km^{2}) (0.71%) is water.

U.S Route 10 passes through the community and is accessible via Loomis Road exit 98. The Pere Marquette Rail-Trail passes through the community along the former railway line. The community is also within the boundaries of the Isabella Indian Reservation.

The community is served by Clare Public Schools, which is located to the northwest in the city of Clare.

== Demographics ==
Historical population
Census	Pop.	Note	%±
2010	213		—
2020	194		−8.9%
U.S. Decennial Census
