= Business routes of U.S. Route 10 in Michigan =

Routes of a highway in Michigan

Business US Highway 10
- Business routes of US 10 highlighted in red, former routes highlighted in purple

Location
- Country: United States
- State: Michigan

Highway system
- United States Numbered Highway System; List; Special; Divided; Michigan State Trunkline Highway System; Interstate; US; State; Byways
← US 10	→ M-10

There are three business routes of US Highway 10 (US 10) in the state of Michigan. They serve as connections from the main highway into Reed City, Clare, and Midland. Additionally, there were another two business routes that connected US 10 to the downtowns of Flint and Pontiac. All these business routes are, or were, former sections of US 10 that were marked Business US Highway 10 (Bus. US 10) after the main highway was realigned to bypass the downtowns of the cities.

The Reed City Bus. US 10 was created by 1960 to follow Chestnut and Church streets into the community's central business district and through adjacent residential areas. In 1975 when US 10 was rerouted to follow the freeways around Clare, the former routing through downtown on McEwan and Fifth streets was redesignated as a business loop; it was also signed to provide connections between US 10 and what is now US 127 because of an incomplete interchange between those two freeways. The Midland business loop dates back to 1961 and follows Eastman Avenue and two sets of one-way streets before completing its routing as a freeway. The two business loops created for Flint and Pontiac were designated in 1941 and 1961, respectively. They followed streets that were once part of US 10, but, after additional changes to US 10's routing in Michigan, they were renumbered as business loops of other highways in 1962 and 1986, respectively. Near Flint, part of US 10 was replaced by M-54 when the US Highway was moved to a freeway, and, near Pontiac, it was replaced by US 24 after US 10 was truncated in the state.

== Reed City ==
Business US Highway 10
- Location: Reed City
- Length: 2.095 mi (3.372 km)
- Existed: By 1960–present

Business US Highway 10 (Bus. US 10) is an east–west business loop running for about 2.1 miles (3.4 km) in Reed City. Running eastbound, the business loop starts at the corner of US 10 and Chestnut Street and runs southward along the latter into downtown. Chestnut Street is old US 131 and passes through some residential neighborhoods. It also crosses the Hersey River and the Pere Marquette State Trail while running parallel to the White Pine Trail along its western half. At the intersection with Church Street near Reed City High School, Bus. US 10 turns eastward. The business loop continues easterly out of downtown and angles northeasterly before crossing the Hersey River and the Pere Marquette State Trail again. Immediately to the northeast of the river crossing, Bus. US 10 intersects its parent highway and terminates. The entire route of the highway follows two-lane streets through town. According to the Michigan Department of Transportation (MDOT), the agency which maintains the roadway, between 1,949 and 5,499 vehicles per day used the business loop on average daily in 2013.

In 1919 when the state highway system was first numbered, the east–west highway running through Reed City was numbered M-20, and it was renumbered to US 10 seven years later when the US Numbered Highway System was created. The business loop was created after US 10 was moved to bypass downtown Reed City in the late 1950s. This realignment was completed, and the business loop commissioned, by 1960. Until 1986, the western half of the loop along Chestnut Street ran concurrently with US 131 until that highway was moved to its current freeway routing.

Major intersections
The entire highway is in Reed City, Osceola County.

mi	km	Destinations	Notes
0.000	0.000	US 10 – Ludington, Clare; Old US 131 north	Roadway continues northward as Old US 131
0.227	0.365	Mackinac Trail	Connector from westbound Bus. US 10 to eastbound US 10
1.011	1.627	Chestnut Street south Church Street west	Bus. US 10 transitions between Chestnut and Church streets; Chestnut Street south is old US 131
2.095	3.372	US 10 – Ludington, Clare	
1.000 mi = 1.609 km; 1.000 km = 0.621 mi

== Clare ==
Business US Highway 10
- Location: Clare
- Length: 5.002 mi (8.050 km)
- Existed: 1975–present

Business US Highway 10 (Bus. US 10) is a business loop in Clare that is just over 5.0 miles (8.0 km) long. From its western end, it branches off its parent highway, US 10, and runs southward into the city of Clare. Because US 10 runs concurrently with US 127 on the northern and eastern sides of Clare, Bus. US 10 is also concurrent with Bus. US 127 on its western leg. Bus. US 10/Bus. US 127 follows McEwan Street southward over the South Branch of the Tobacco River and through a residential area on the north side of the city. Several blocks further south, the highway enters the downtown district and turns onto Fifth Street, separating from Bus. US 127.

Fifth Street continues eastward and then southeasterly out of downtown and through residential areas. At Clarabella Road, the business loop crosses from Clare County into Isabella County before passing under the US 127 freeway without an interchange. Bus. US 10 runs parallel to the Pere Marquette Rail-Trail on Saginaw Road in a rural section of Isabella County before terminating at an interchange that connects it to eastbound US 10 in Wise Township. Through the city, the business loop has four lanes for traffic, but the rural segment in Isabella County has two. According to MDOT, the agency which maintains the roadway, between 4,035 and 6,540 vehicles per day used the business loop on average daily in 2013.

In 1919 when the state highway system was first numbered, the east–west highway running through Clare was numbered M-20, and it was renumbered to US 10 seven years later when the United States Numbered Highway System was created. In late 1961, the US 10 freeway east of the city to Midland was finished, but the route through downtown remained part of US 10. A freeway bypass north of Clare and Farwell opened in 1975, and US 10 was rerouted along the then-US 27 freeway to connect from the new bypass to the existing freeway east of the city, bypassing both cities. The section of US 10 in downtown Clare was designated Bus. US 10 at this time, running along then-Bus. US 27 to connect to US 27/US 10 north of downtown. The section of former US 10 between Farwell and Clare became an extended M-115 in 1989. In 2002, US 27 in Michigan was renumbered to US 127, and the business loops were renumbered accordingly.

Major intersections

County	Location	mi	km	Destinations	Notes
Clare	Grant–Sheridan township line	0.000	0.000	US 127 / US 10 – Mackinac Bridge, Lansing, Midland Bus. US 127 south Clare Avenue north	Common terminus for both Bus. US 127 and Bus. US 10; exit 160 on US 127/US 10; roadway continues northward as Clare Avenue
Clare	Clare	1.716	2.762	Bus. US 127 south (McEwan Street) – Lansing M-115 west (5th Street) – Farwell	Southern end of Bus. US 127 concurrency; eastern terminus of M-115
Isabella	Wise Township	5.002	8.050	US 10 east – Midland; Pere Marquette Road east	Eastbound exit and westbound entrance only
1.000 mi = 1.609 km; 1.000 km = 0.621 mi: Concurrency terminus; Incomplete access

== Midland ==
Business US Highway 10
- Location: Midland
- Length: 7.200 mi (11.587 km)
- Existed: c. 1961–present

Business US Highway 10 (Bus. US 10) is a business loop running for 7.2 miles (11.6 km) in Midland in Midland County. The highway starts at exit 122 on US 10 north of downtown near Midland Mall. The business loop runs southward along the four lanes of Eastman Avenue through residential neighborhoods and past the Midland Country Club and Midland Center for the Arts. Further south, the business loop splits to follow the one-way pairing of Buttles Street (eastbound) and Indian Street (westbound); these two streets run northwest-to-southeast parallel to the Tittabawassee River. At Jerome Street, M-20 merges onto the business loop. The two highways run concurrently from this point eastward. On the eastern edge of downtown, Bus. US 10/M-20 passes Dow Diamond, home of the Great Lakes Loons, a Minor League Baseball team, and then the highway turns northeasterly. East of Jefferson Avenue, Bus. US 10/M-20 turns east–west along the one-way pairing of Lyon Road (eastbound) and Patrick Road (westbound).

East of Washington Street and Saginaw Road, the highway transitions from one-way streets to a freeway; the transition between the eastbound freeway and Patrick Road passes through a roundabout in the Saginaw Road interchange. As the freeway continues eastward, there is a partial interchange for Waldo Road, and then the highway crosses into the section of Midland that is located in Bay County. Immediately east of the county line, Bus. US 10 and M-20 jointly terminate at a directional interchange with US 10; traffic on the eastbound business loop defaults onto eastbound US 10, and traffic on the westbound business loop originates on westbound US 10. According to MDOT, the agency which maintains the roadway, between 7,317 and 23,733 vehicles per day used the business loop on average daily in 2013. The section of Bus. US 10 that runs concurrently with M-20 has been listed on the National Highway System, a network of roads important to the country's economy, defense, and mobility.

In 1919 when the state highway system was first numbered, the east–west highways connecting at Midland were numbered M-20 and M-24. M-20 to the northwest of the city along with M-24 to the southeast (along what is today M-47) were renumbered to US 10 seven years later when the US Numbered Highway System was created. Afterward, M-24 west of Midland became part of M-20. By the middle of the 1930s, US 10 was shifted to bypass downtown Midland, and the former route on the west side of town was numbered US 10A. At the end of the 1950s, M-20 east of Midland to Bay City was converted to a freeway, By the middle of 1961, the freeway bypass of Midland was completed, and the business loop was designated along the former US 10A and part of M-20; at the same time, US 10 was rerouted to replace M-20 east of Midland to Bay City

Major intersections
The entire highway is in Midland. All exits are unnumbered.

County	mi	km	Destinations	Notes
Midland	0.000– 0.117	0.000– 0.188	US 10 – Clare, Bay City	
Midland	2.853	4.591	M-20 west (Jerome Street) – Mt. Pleasant	Western end of M-20 concurrency
Midland	4.595	7.395	Western end of freeway	
Midland	4.866	7.831	Saginaw Road	Eastbound exit and westbound entrance are via roundabout with Patrick Road, which replaced an existing intersection in mid-2014
Midland	6.037	9.716	Waldo Avenue	Westbound exit and eastbound entrance only
Bay	7.200	11.587	M-20 west US 10 – Bay City	Eastern terminus of Bus. US 10 and M-20; westbound exit and eastbound entrance only
1.000 mi = 1.609 km; 1.000 km = 0.621 mi: Concurrency terminus; Incomplete access

== Flint ==
Business US Highway 10
- Location: Grand Blanc–Mount Morris
- Length: 14.767 mi (23.765 km)
- Existed: 1941–1962

Business US Highway 10 (Bus. US 10 ) was a business loop in the Flint area. It ran for about 14.8 miles (23.8 km) along Saginaw Road, which was also called Saginaw Street in the city of Flint. The highway connected to its parent in Mount Morris Township and ran southerly along Saginaw Road through Mount Morris. From there, the business loop paralleled what is now I-475 into the city of Flint on Saginaw Street. In downtown, the loop crossed the Flint River. There were intersections with both directions of M-21; eastbound M-21 was routed on 5th Street while westbound traffic followed Court Street one block north. South of downtown, Bus. US 10 turned southeasterly to run through suburban Burton before terminating at an intersection with US 10 (Dort Highway) near Grand Blanc in Grand Blanc Township. Saginaw Road was a multilane undivided street for its length at the time it was Bus. US 10

Originally, Saginaw Road in the Flint area was a part of the Saginaw Trail, a Native-American footpath in the area. When the state signed its highway system in 1919, Saginaw Road was part of M-10. Later, it was used as a section of US 10 in 1926. By 1930, the main highway was moved eastward to follow Dort Highway, and the route through the city was designated M-10. It was renumbered to Bus. US 10 in 1941. Later, in 1962, US 10 was moved again to follow the recently completed I-75 freeway; the former route of US 10 was redesignated M-54, and its business loop was renumbered to match.

Major intersections
The entire highway was in Genesee County.

Location	mi	km	Destinations	Notes
Mount Morris Township	0.000	0.000	US 10 (Dort Highway)	
Flint	9.675	15.570	M-21 west (Court Street) – Grand Rapids, Lansing	Westbound half of a one-way pairing for M-21
Flint	9.756	15.701	M-21 east (5th Street) – Port Huron	Eastbound half of a one-way pairing for M-21
Grand Blanc Township	14.767	23.765	US 10 (Dort Highway)	
1.000 mi = 1.609 km; 1.000 km = 0.621 mi

== Pontiac ==
Business US Highway 10
- Location: Pontiac
- Length: 6.925 mi (11.145 km)
- Existed: c. 1961–1986

Business US Highway 10 (Bus. US 10) was an approximately 6.9-mile-long (11.1 km) business loop running in Pontiac. It was redesignated in 1986 as a business route of US 24 after US 10 was truncated to Bay City. The roadways it used were at four lanes where they carried two-way traffic, and two or three lanes where they carried one-way traffic through the area.

Bus. US 10 started northwest of downtown at the intersection of Telegraph Road and Dixie Highway in Waterford Township before crossing into the city of Pontiac. From there, the highway followed Dixie Highway southeasterly bordered by residential neighborhoods to the north and rail yards to the south of the four-lane street. From the intersection with Montcalm Street southward, the eastbound direction branched off to follow Cass Avenue two blocks to the south of Oakland Avenue. At the northern end of downtown, Bus. US 10 merged onto a loop formed by Wide Track Drive around the downtown core southward to Saginaw Street. The loop is shaped like an upside-down tear drop that is about four blocks wide at the northern end tapering to a single intersection at the south. Wide Track Drive also carried the two directions of Business Loop Interstate 75 (BL I-75) around downtown Pontiac between Saginaw Street and Perry Street. The two directions of BL I-75/Bus. US 10 intersected M-59 on opposite sides of the central business district at Huron Street. The business loop continued southward along Wide Track Drive to the intersection of Saginaw Street. From there, BL I-75/Bus. US 10 followed Saginaw south toward South Boulevard, which marked the southern end of Saginaw and the northern end of Woodward Avenue, and from there past the hospital and out of the city of Pontiac. South of the city limits, the roadway was bordered by residential subdivisions. At Square Lake Road, Bus. US 10 turned westward, BL I-75 turned eastward and M-1 continued south on Woodward Avenue. Bus. US 10 followed Square Lake Road for about 1.3 miles (2.1 km) before terminating at an intersection with US 10 (Telegraph Road).

In 1919 when the state highway system was first numbered, the north–south highway through Pontiac was numbered M-10, and it was renumbered to US 10 seven years later when the US Numbered Highway System was created. A number of highway designation and routing changes in the Pontiac were made when US 10 was shifted out of downtown to replace M-58 along Telegraph Road west of downtown by the middle of 1961. Before the change, US 10 followed Dixie Highway and Oakland Avenue southeast into Pontiac to Perry Street and then Perry Street to Saginaw to Woodward Avenue while M-58 was routed along Telegraph and Square Lake roads. After the change, US 10 turned south from Dixie Highway onto Telegraph Road and then east onto Square Lake Road to connect back to Woodward Avenue. The old route through downtown was assigned the Bus. US 10 moniker and M-58 was decommissioned as a highway designation. Nine years later, US 10 was moved off Woodward Avenue between Pontiac and Detroit to follow the Lodge Freeway and Telegraph Road. Bus. US 10 was extended westward along Square Lake Road from the intersection of Woodward Avenue to the junction with Telegraph Road so that it would continue to connect with its parent highway on the southern end. In 1985, MDOT received permission from the American Association of State Highway and Transportation Officials to truncate US 10 to Bay City, and, when the change was made the following year, US 24 replaced US 10 on Telegraph Road north of Square Lake Road, and Bus. US 10 through downtown was redesignated Bus. US 24.

Major intersections
The entire highway was in Oakland County.

Location	mi	km	Destinations	Notes
Waterford Township	0.000	0.000	US 10 (Dixie Highway, Telegraph Road)	Roadway continued as US 10 on Dixie Highway
Pontiac	2.390	3.846	BL I-75 (Wide Track Drive)	Northern end of BL I-75 concurrency around the one-way Wide Track Drive
Pontiac	2.804	4.513	M-59 (Huron Street)	
Pontiac	3.483	5.605	Southern end of Wide Track Drive	
Pontiac	4.350	7.001	South Boulevard	Southern end of Saginaw Street; northern end of Woodward Avenue
Bloomfield Township	5.638	9.073	BL I-75 south (Square Lake Road east) M-1 south (Woodward Avenue) – Detroit	Southern end of BL I-75 concurrency; northern terminus of M-1
Bloomfield Township	6.925	11.145	US 10 / US 24 south (Telegraph Road)	
1.000 mi = 1.609 km; 1.000 km = 0.621 mi: Concurrency terminus
