= Fred C. Reger =

American politician

Fred C. Reger (April 14, 1916 – September 12, 1994) was a member of the Wisconsin State Assembly.

== Biography ==
Reger was born in Clare, Michigan. He later moved to Merrill, Wisconsin.

== Career ==
Reger was elected to the Assembly in 1962. From 1946 to 1948, he served as Mayor of Merrill. Additionally, he was a member of the Merrill City Council, eventually serving as its president, and the Lincoln County, Wisconsin Board. He was a Republican.
