= Cops & Doughnuts =

Bakery in Clare, Michigan, US

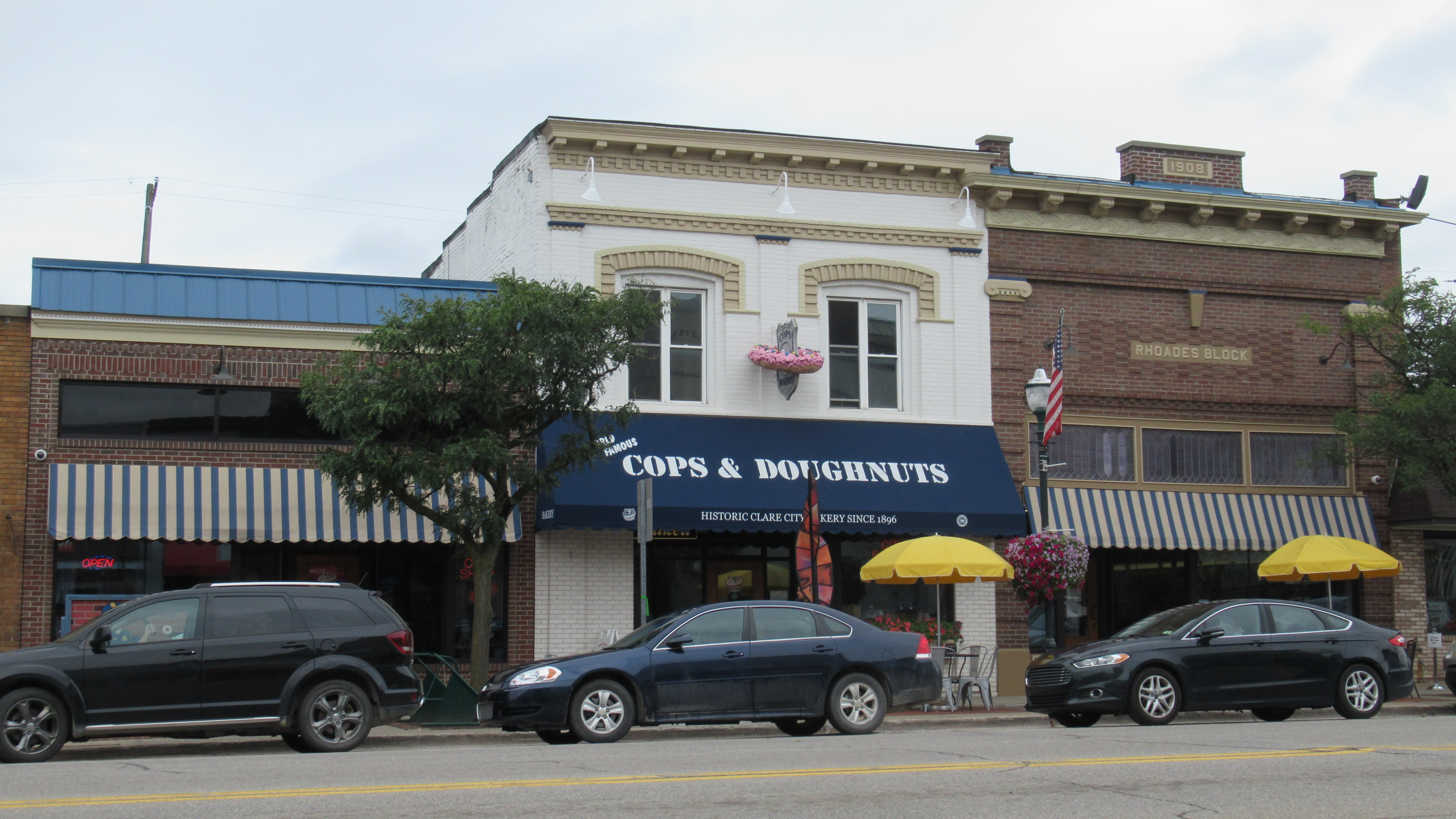
- Main bakery location in downtown Clare
- Interactive map of Cops & Doughnuts

Restaurant information
- Established: 1896 (as Clare City Bakery); 2009 (as Cops & Doughnuts)
- Owners: Greg Rynearson, Alan White, Brian Gregory, John Pedjac, David Saad, Greg Kolhoff, Richard Ward, Dwayne Miedzianowski, Jeremy McGraw
- Food type: Doughnuts, Coffee, multiple baked goods
- Location: 521 North McEwan Street, Clare, Michigan, 48617, United States
- Coordinates: 43°49′10″N 84°46′07″W
- Other locations: Bay City, Gaylord, Mount Pleasant
- Website: Official website

Cops & Doughnuts is a bakery in Clare, Michigan, United States. Opened in 2009 in the former Clare City Bakery, the shop is notable for being owned by members of the city's police department.

== History ==
Cops & Doughnuts first opened in 2009 when nine officers in the police department of Clare purchased the Clare City Bakery, which was about to go out of business due to the economic decline at the time. Greg Rynearson, one of the officers, retired to focus on the bakery full time. In addition to a full-scale bakery serving coffee and doughnuts, the store also features a diner and gift shop which sells police officer-related merchandise.

In 2015, the store had more than 500,000 visitors. The owners also began distributing their doughnuts and coffee to other local retailers, including a "precinct" inside the Jay's Sporting Goods store in Gaylord. Plans were announced to open a third location in Bay City.

The bakery has been publicized for the novelty of a doughnut shop being owned by police officers.

During the 2020 coronavirus pandemic, the store gained attention during the eNASCAR iRacing Pro Invitational Series when Mike Joy asked motorsport fans who knew of local shops that sponsored race cars to send him information on local racers sponsored by local shops for him to profile those stores during the post-race “Time to Make the Doughnuts” segment. At the Dover round, Joy profiled a local Street Stock racer sponsored by the store and the store itself after the race.
