= Clare Congregational Church =

Historic church in Michigan, United States

- Clare Congregational Church

Clergy
- Pastor: Connie Bongard
- Clare Congregational Church
- U.S. National Register of Historic Places
- Michigan State Historic Site
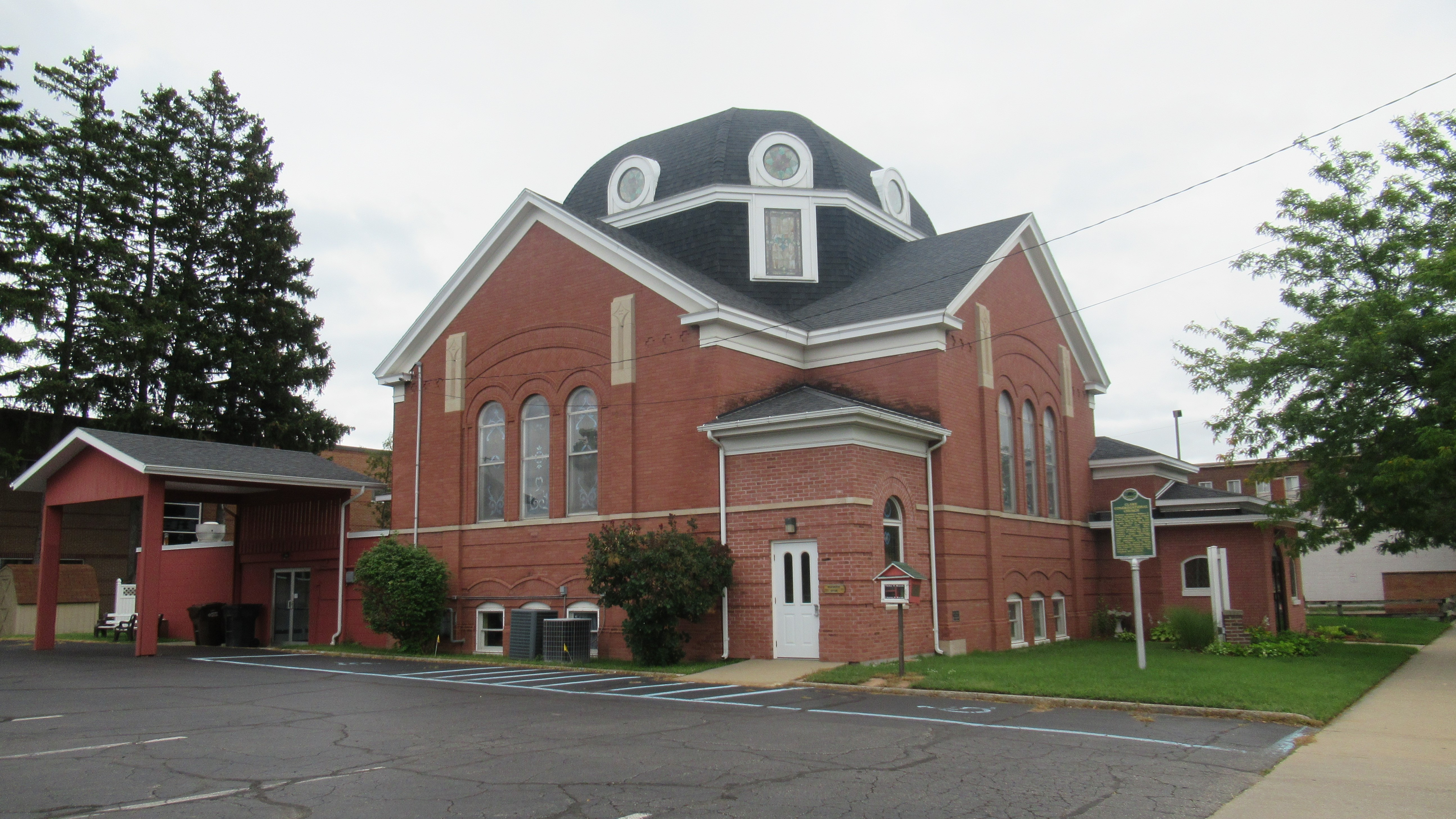
- View of the church in September 2022

- Location within Michigan Location within the United States
- Location: 110 W. Fifth St., Clare, Michigan
- Coordinates: 43°49′11″N 84°46′10″W
- Area: less than one acre
- Built: 1908
- Architect: William T. Cooper
- Architectural style: Early Christian Revival
- NRHP reference No.: 94001424

Significant dates
- Added to NRHP: December 9, 1994
- Designated MSHS: March 17, 1994

The Clare Congregational Church, also known as the Clare Congregational United Church of Christ, is a church located at 110 West Fifth Street in Clare, Michigan. It was designated a Michigan State Historic Site and listed on the National Register of Historic Places in 1994.

== History ==
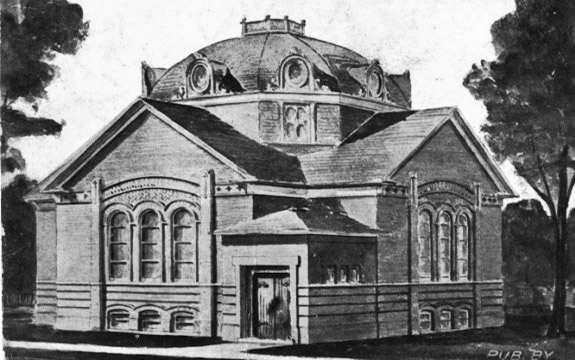
Clare Congregational Church, 1909

The village of Clare was established in 1870−71. The Rev. Austin H. Norris arrived in 1872, and organized the Clare Congregational Church. The congregation first met in a school house, but in 1873 work was begun on a small frame church, which was completed in 1874.

In 1907, the congregation determined that a new church building was required. The original church was moved to the rear of the lot, and in 1908 the church commissioned Saginaw architect William T. Cooper to design the new building. Construction was completed in 1909.

In 1961, the Clare Congregational Church merged with the United Church of Christ, and the combined congregation was known as the Clare Congregational United Church of Christ. The building was extensively renovated in 1994, and is still used by the congregation.

== Description ==
The Clare Congregational Church is a red brick building with limestone trim on a concrete foundation, built in a cross-shape with an octagonal dome. Each of the four facades features a limestone beltcourse above the high basement, and broad central area containing three windows flanked by shallow piers with limestone trim. The main entrance to the church is a small hip roof structure located at one corner. The central dome is pierced by stained glass windows. Stained glass in the remainder of the church was originally installed in the earlier 1874 building.

A single-story addition was constructed at the rear of the church in 1958.

The interior consists of a semi-circular sanctuary, decorated with patterns from European-designed stencils. The church is significant as one of the few in Michigan that reflect the architectural adoption by early twentieth-century Protestants of the Early Christian central plan churches of the 5th and 6th centuries.
