= Clare Municipal Airport =

Airport in Michigan, United States

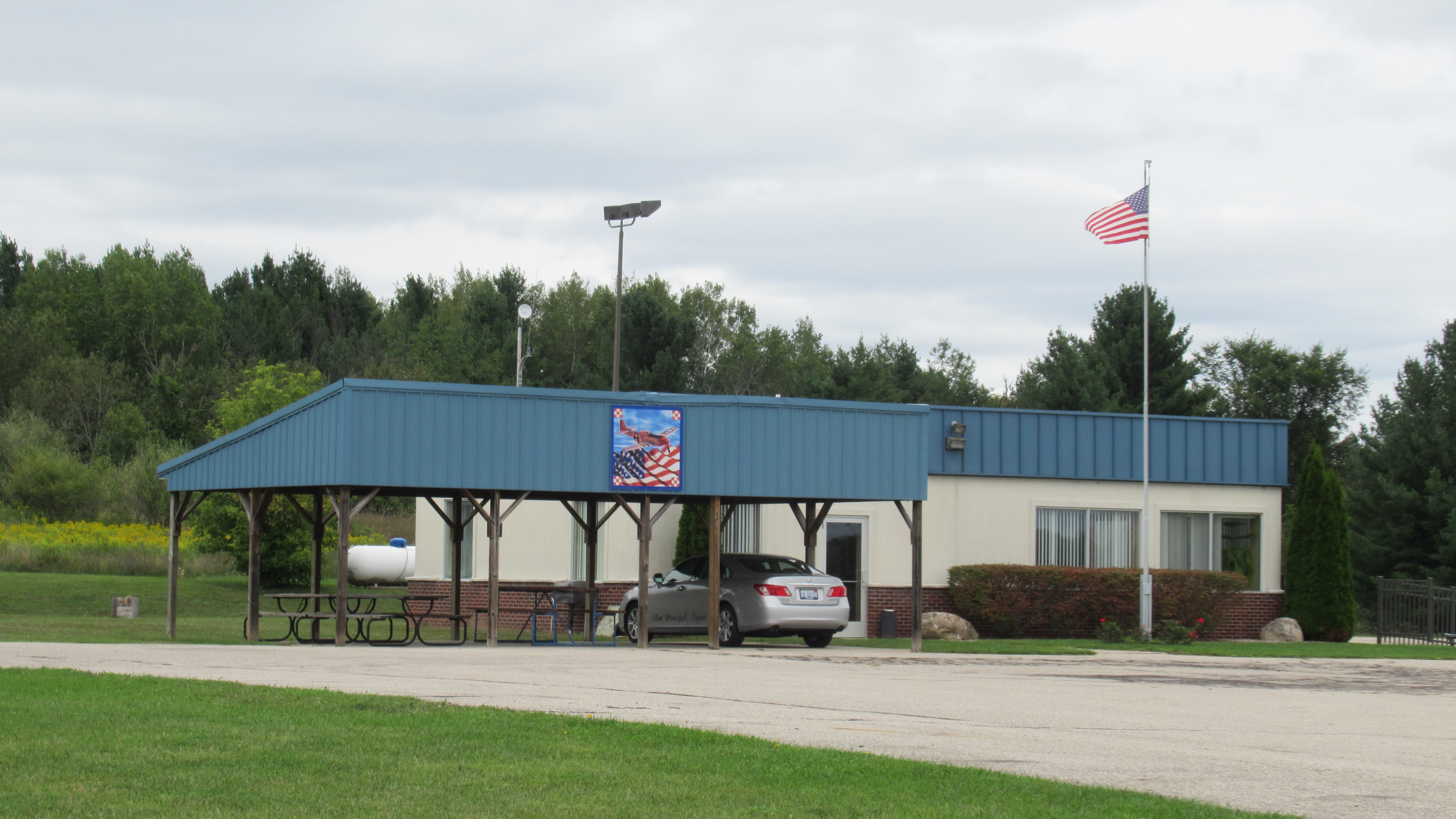
- IATA: none; ICAO: none; FAA LID: 48D

Summary
- Airport type: Public
- Owner: City of Clare
- Location: Clare, Michigan
- Elevation AMSL: 857 ft (261 m)
- Coordinates: 43°50′04″N 084°44′25″W
- Website: www.clare48d.com

Map
- Location of airport in Michigan 48D (the United States)

Runways
Direction	Length		Surface
Direction	ft	m	Surface
4/22	3,500	1,067	Asphalt
9/27	2,500	762	Asphalt

Statistics (2019)
- Aircraft operations: 8,030
- Based aircraft: 34
- Source: Federal Aviation Administration

Clare Municipal Airport (FAA LID: 48D) is a public airport located one mile (2 km) east of downtown Clare, a city in Clare County, Michigan, United States. The airport became active in 1941. It serves general aviation for Clare and the surrounding area. It is included in the Federal Aviation Administration (FAA) National Plan of Integrated Airport Systems for 2017–2021, in which it is categorized as a local general aviation facility.

The airport is home to a flight school as well as a commercial pipeline inspection company. The airport hosts a number of annual community events such as an Easter Egg drop, an ice cream social, a chili cook-off, and an RC Jet event.

During Hurricane Dorian in 2019, the airport made its spare parking spaces available to affected aircraft owners who wanted to move the planes for safekeeping during the storm. Up to 60 places were available.

== Facilities and aircraft ==
Clare Municipal Airport covers an area of 200 acres (81 ha) which contains two asphalt paved runways: 4/22 measuring 3,500 x 75 ft (1,067 x 23 m) and 9/27 measuring 2,500 x 75 ft (762 x 23 m).

The airport has a fixed-base operator that offers fuel, courtesy transportation, conference rooms, a crew lounge, showers, and more.

For the 12-month period ending December 31, 2019, the airport had 8,030 general aviation aircraft operations, an average of 22 per day. There are 34 aircraft based at this airport: 34 single-engine and 2 multi-engine airplanes as well as 1 ultralight.

== Accidents and incidents ==
- On February 14, 2003, a Cessna 172 Skyhawk veered off the runway and impacted a snowbank during takeoff at the airport. The student pilot aboard, who was uninjured, said she rotated too soon, and the plane veered left as she tried to lower it again. She tried retarding the throttle but was unable to prevent the aircraft from departing the runway and impacting the snowbank. The probable cause was found to be the student pilot's failure to maintain directional control of the airplane during takeoff roll.
- On August 7, 2013, a Piper PA-28 Cherokee crashed on landing at Clare Airport. The flight instructor aboard the aircraft was low, slow, and drifting left during the approach. He took control and attempted a go-around, but the aircraft was pushed off the runway by a gust of wind and settled into the grass next to the runway. The aircraft touched down and bounced and subsequently impacted the side of a ditch bank. The probable cause was found to be the flight instructor's failure to adequately monitor the landing approach, his delayed corrective action and his failure to maintain directional control that resulted in the airplane's collision with a ditch adjacent to the runway with the student pilot's failure to maintain a proper glidepath contributing to the accident.

== See also ==
- List of airports in Michigan
