= Clare, Michigan =

- City
- City of Clare
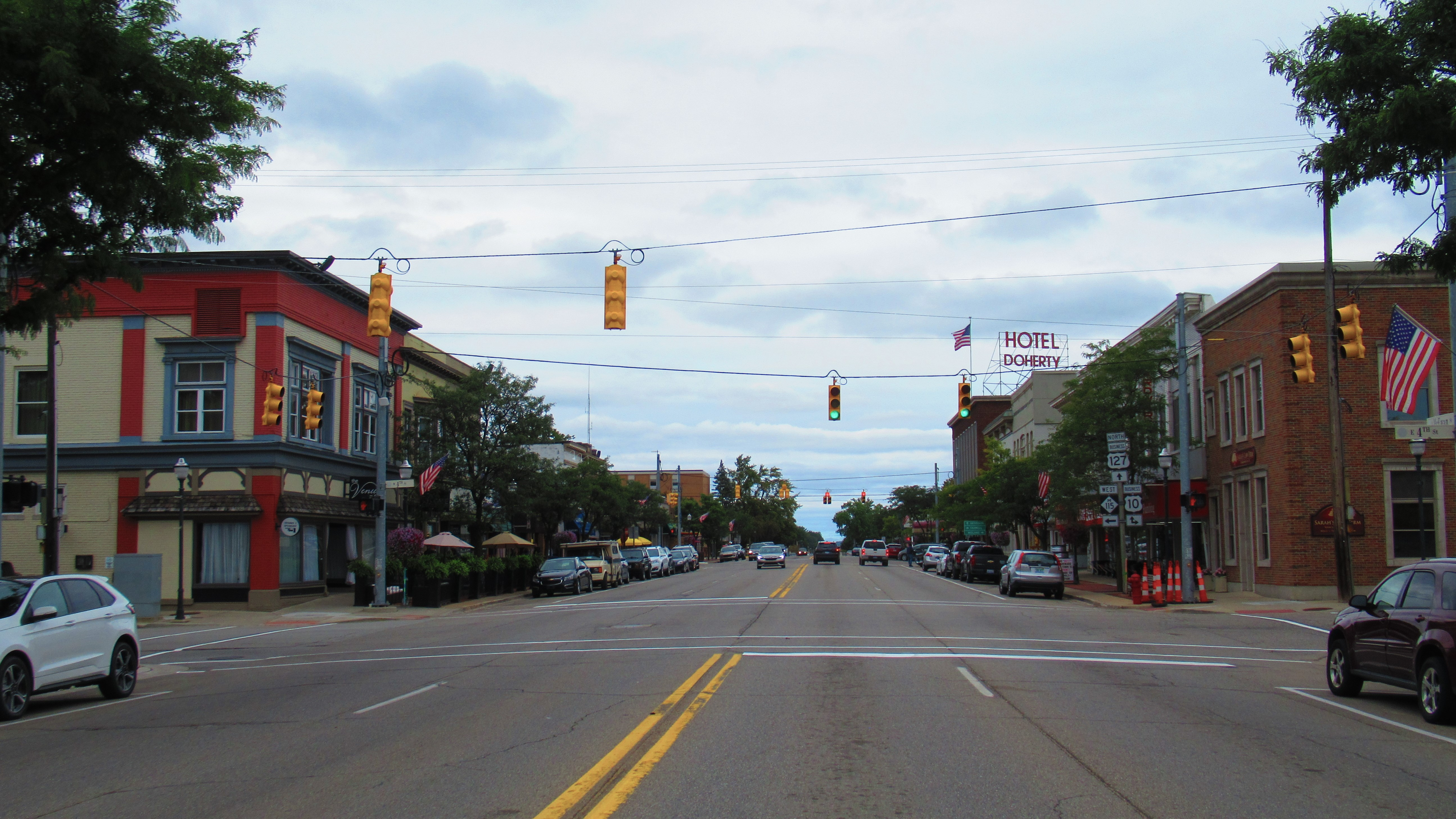
- Downtown Clare along Bus. US 10 / 127
- Nicknames: "The Crossroads of Michigan", "Gateway to the North", "City of Festivals"
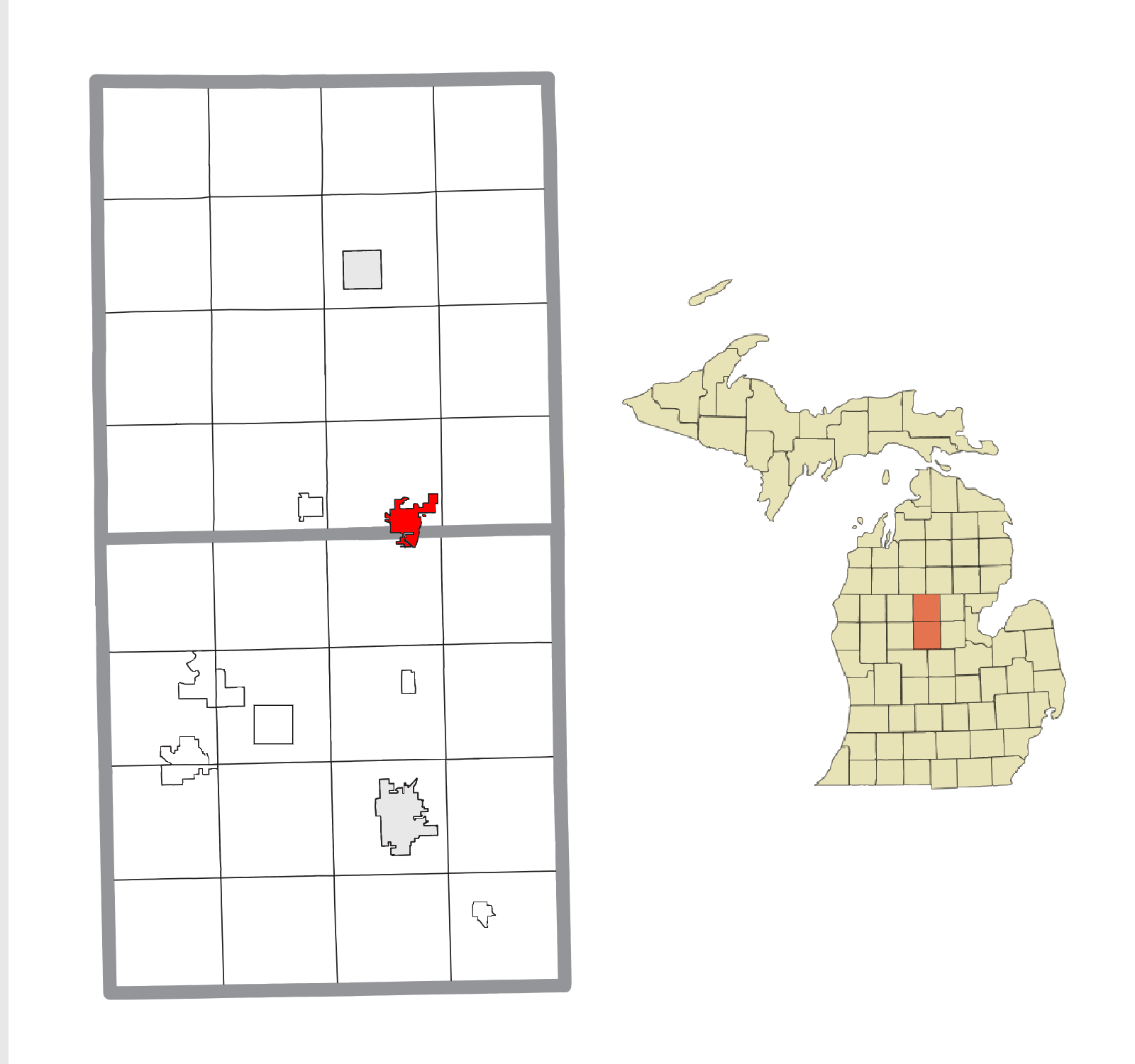
- Location within Clare County (top) and Isabella County (bottom)

- Location within the state of Michigan Location within the United States
- Coordinates: 43°49′10″N 84°46′07″W
- Country: United States
- State: Michigan
- Counties: Clare and Isabella
- Founded: 1870
- Incorporated: 1885 (village); 1891 (city)

Government
  - Type: City commission
  - Mayor: Pat Humphrey
  - Clerk: Diane Lyon
  - Manager: Jeremy Howard

Area
  - Total: 3.83 sq mi (9.92 km^{2})
  - Land: 3.72 sq mi (9.63 km^{2})
  - Water: 0.11 sq mi (0.28 km^{2})
- Elevation: 837 ft (255 m)

Population (2020)
  - Total: 3,254
  - Density: 874.2/sq mi (337.53/km^{2})
- Time zone: UTC-5 (Eastern (EST))
  - Summer (DST): UTC-4 (EDT)
- ZIP code(s): 48617
- Area code: 989
- FIPS code: 26-15920
- GNIS feature ID: 0623335
- Website: cityofclare.gov

Clare is a city in the U.S. state of Michigan. Located near the center of Michigan's Lower Peninsula, the city is located mostly in Clare County, while a small portion extends south into Isabella County. The city had a population of 3,254 at the 2020 census.

Clare was settled as early as 1870 and contains two listings on the National Register of Historic Places: the Clare Downtown Historic District and the Clare Congregational Church. The city is located along the junction of U.S. Route 10 and U.S. Route 127, and each highway has a business route (Bus. 10 and Bus. US 127) through the downtown area. M-115 also runs through the city. The convergence of these highways as well as the historic junction of the Ann Arbor and Pere Marquette railroads has led to the city being nicknamed the "Crossroads of Michigan". The city is also nicknamed the "Gateway to the North" and the "City of Festivals".

== History ==
Clare was founded with the coming of the Pere Marquette Railroad in 1870. It was named after the county, which was named after County Clare in Ireland. The Clare post office opened on January 20, 1871. It incorporated as a village in 1879 and as a city in 1891.

Cops & Doughnuts is a bakery that opened in 2009 in the former Clare City Bakery that dates back to 1896.

== Geography ==
According to the U.S. Census Bureau, the city has a total area of 3.83 square miles (9.92 km^{2}), of which 3.72 square miles (9.63 km^{2}) is land and 0.11 square miles (0.28 km^{2}) (2.87%) is water.

The south branch of the Tobacco River flows through the city and also contains Lake Shamrock.

=== Climate ===
This climatic region is typified by large seasonal temperature differences, with warm to hot (and often humid) summers and cold (sometimes severely cold) winters. According to the Köppen Climate Classification system, Clare has a humid continental climate, abbreviated "Dfb" on climate maps.

== Demographics ==
Historical population
Census	Pop.	Note	%±
1880	502		—
1890	1,174		133.9%
1900	1,326		12.9%
1910	1,350		1.8%
1920	1,462		8.3%
1930	1,491		2.0%
1940	1,844		23.7%
1950	2,440		32.3%
1960	2,442		0.1%
1970	2,639		8.1%
1980	3,300		25.0%
1990	3,021		−8.5%
2000	3,173		5.0%
2010	3,118		−1.7%
2020	3,254		4.4%
U.S. Decennial Census

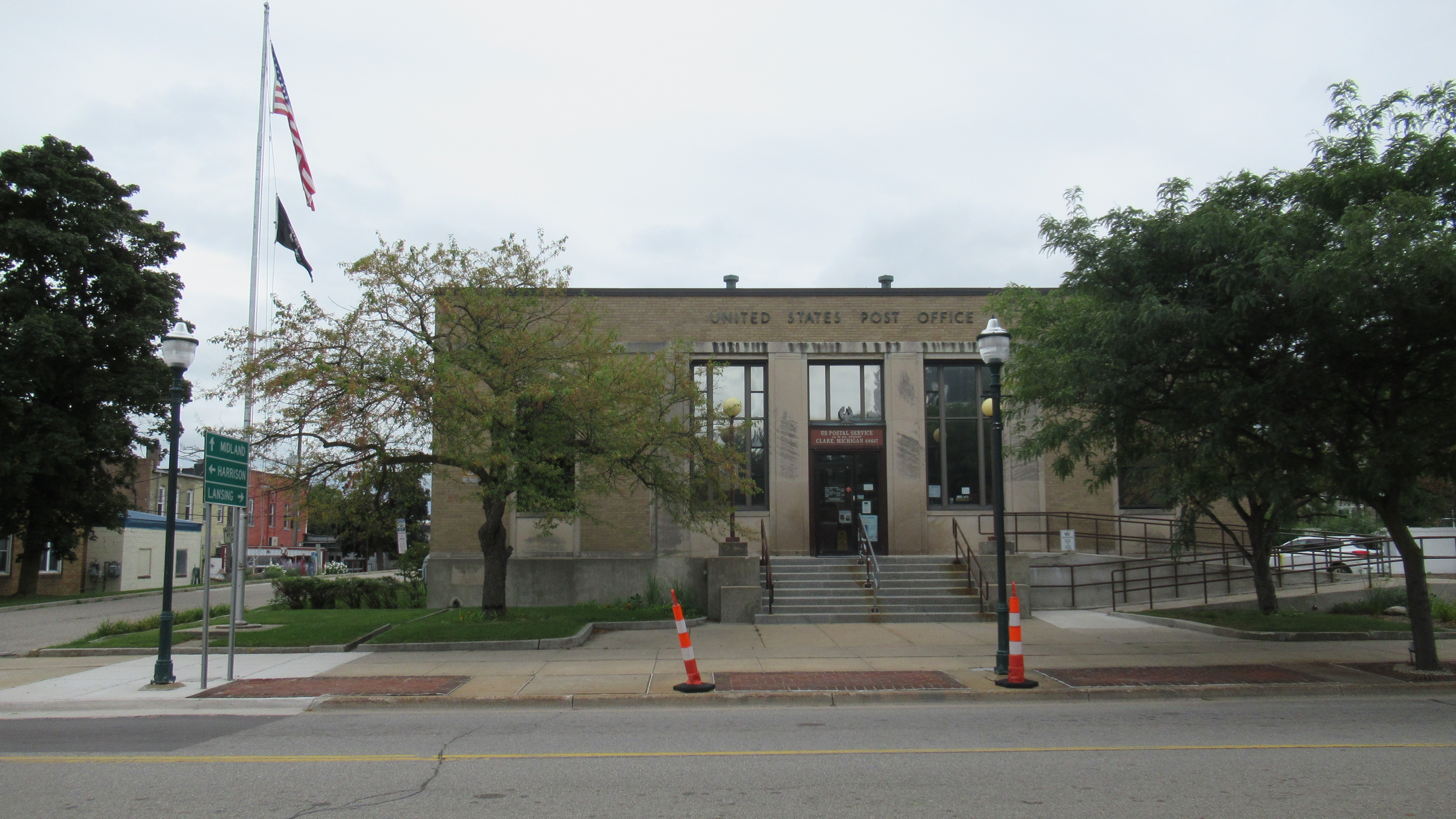
Post Office

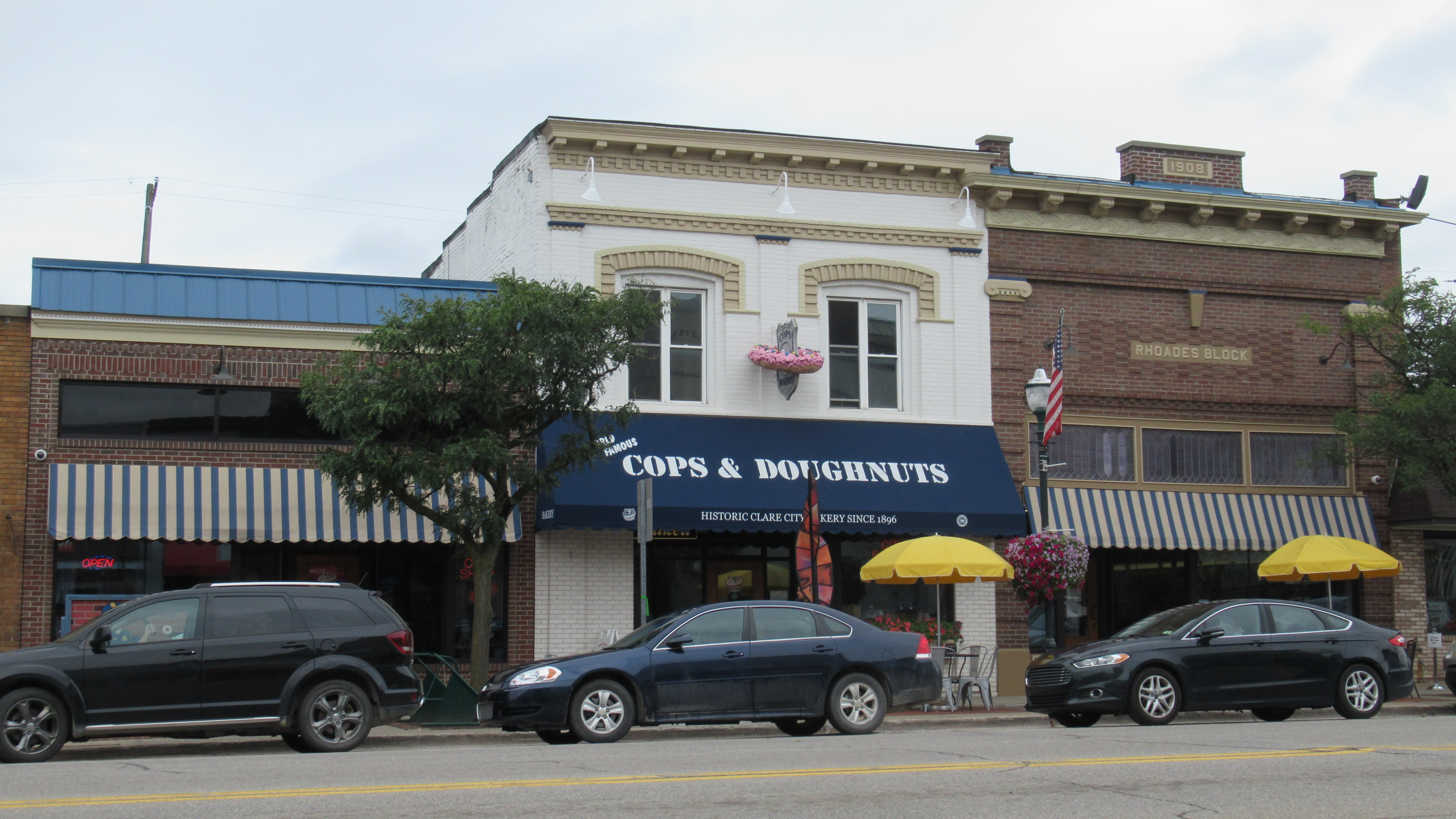
Cops & Doughnuts

=== 2020 census ===
As of the 2020 census, Clare had a population of 3,254. The median age was 38.3 years. 25.2% of residents were under the age of 18 and 20.1% of residents were 65 years of age or older. For every 100 females there were 85.7 males, and for every 100 females age 18 and over there were 79.8 males age 18 and over.

0.0% of residents lived in urban areas, while 100.0% lived in rural areas.

There were 1,433 households in Clare, of which 31.6% had children under the age of 18 living in them. Of all households, 34.6% were married-couple households, 20.7% were households with a male householder and no spouse or partner present, and 35.7% were households with a female householder and no spouse or partner present. About 39.4% of all households were made up of individuals and 18.7% had someone living alone who was 65 years of age or older.

There were 1,546 housing units, of which 7.3% were vacant. The homeowner vacancy rate was 0.9% and the rental vacancy rate was 6.8%.

Racial composition as of the 2020 census
Race	Number	Percent
White	2,955	90.8%
Black or African American	32	1.0%
American Indian and Alaska Native	26	0.8%
Asian	21	0.6%
Native Hawaiian and Other Pacific Islander	0	0.0%
Some other race	34	1.0%
Two or more races	186	5.7%
Hispanic or Latino (of any race)	78	2.4%

=== 2010 census ===
As of the census of 2010, there were 3,118 people, 1,354 households, and 764 families residing in the city. The population density was 919.8 inhabitants per square mile (355.1/km^{2}). There were 1,534 housing units at an average density of 452.5 per square mile (174.7/km^{2}). The racial makeup of the city was 85.0% White, 4.7% African American, 0.9% Native American, 6.1% Asian, 1.5% from other races, and 1.8% from two or more races. Hispanic or Latino of any race were 6.5% of the population.

There were 1,354 households, of which 31.7% had children under the age of 18 living with them, 36.0% were married couples living together, 15.7% had a female householder with no husband present, 4.7% had a male householder with no wife present, and 43.6% were non-families. 36.9% of all households were made up of individuals, and 13.1% had someone living alone who was 65 years of age or older. The average household size was 2.22 and the average family size was 2.88.

The median age in the city was 36.1 years. 23.9% of residents were under the age of 18; 11.9% were between the ages of 18 and 24; 24.3% were from 25 to 44; 22.9% were from 45 to 64; and 16.9% were 65 years of age or older. The gender makeup of the city was 45.2% male and 54.8% female.

=== 2000 census ===
As of the census of 2000, there were 3,173 people, 1,380 households, and 783 families residing in the city. The population density was 2,016.7 inhabitants per square mile (778.7/km^{2}). There were 1,487 housing units at an average density of 476.5 per square mile (184.0/km^{2}). The racial makeup of the city was 89.35% White, 8.25% African American, 0.60% Native American, 0.50% Asian, 0.41% from other races, and 0.88% from two or more races. Hispanic or Latino of any race were 9.58% of the population.

There were 1,380 households out of which 29.4% had children under the age of 18 living with them, 40.9% were married couples living together, 13.0% had a female householder with no husband present, and 43.2% were non-families. 38.0% of all households were made up of individuals and 17.8% had someone living alone who was 65 years of age or older. The average household size was 2.20 and the average family size was 2.92.

In the city the population was spread out with 24.7% under the age of 18, 10.1% from 18 to 24, 25.3% from 25 to 44, 19.4% from 45 to 64, and 20.5% who were 65 years of age or older. The median age was 37 years. For every 100 females there were 78.1 males. For every 100 females age 18 and over, there were 72.1 males.

The median income for a household in the city was $27,299, and the median income for a family was $36,194. Males had a median income of $28,365 versus $19,861 for females. The per capita income for the city was $18,006. About 10.6% of families and 16.0% of the population were below the poverty line, including 16.3% of those under age 18 and 13.3% of those age 65 or over.

== Parks and recreation ==
Trails include:

- Pere Marquette Rail-Trail is a rail trail that has its western terminus in Clare.
- Pere Marquette State Trail is a bicycle and multi-use trail that runs through the city.

== Education ==
The city of Clare is served entirely by its own school district, Clare Public Schools, which is centrally located within the city and serves the southeastern portion of the Clare County and the northeastern portion of Isabella County.

== Infrastructure ==
=== Transportation ===
==== Major highways ====
- U.S. Route 10 in Michigan
- U.S. Route 127 in Michigan
- U.S. Route 10 Business Route
- M-115

==== Airport ====
- Clare Municipal Airport

==== Bus ====
- Indian Trails has a station in Clare that provides daily intercity bus service between St. Ignace and East Lansing.

== Notable people ==
- Fred C. Reger, Wisconsin state politician, born in Clare
- Debbie Stabenow, politician who served in the U.S. Senate from 2001 to 2025, grew up in Clare
- Wayne Terwilliger, World War II veteran and Major League Baseball player, born in Clare
- Cody Vance, Professional wrestler currently wrestling under the name of Cody Preston for AEW, who graduated from Clare High School in 2010.
- Glenn Douglas Packard, dancer, reality television star, recording artist and film director, born in Clare
