= Pere Marquette Rail-Trail =

Rail trail in Michigan

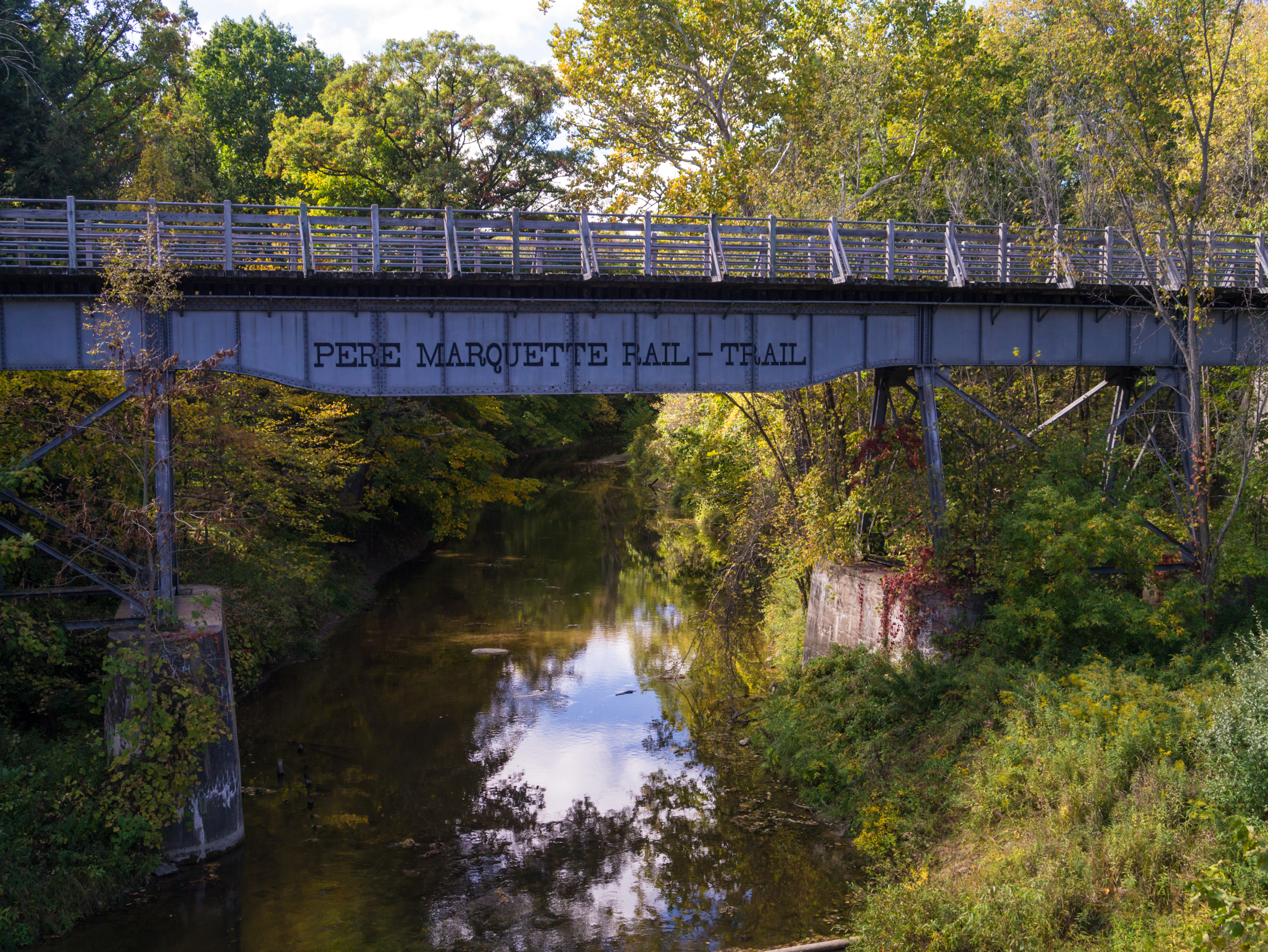
- Length: 28 mi (45 km)
- Location: Clare, Isabella, and Midland Counties, Michigan
- Trailheads: Clare, Michigan; Loomis, Michigan; Coleman, Michigan; Sanford, Michigan; Midland, Michigan
- Use: Walking, running, biking, rollerblading
- Difficulty: Easy
- Surface: Asphalt
Trail map

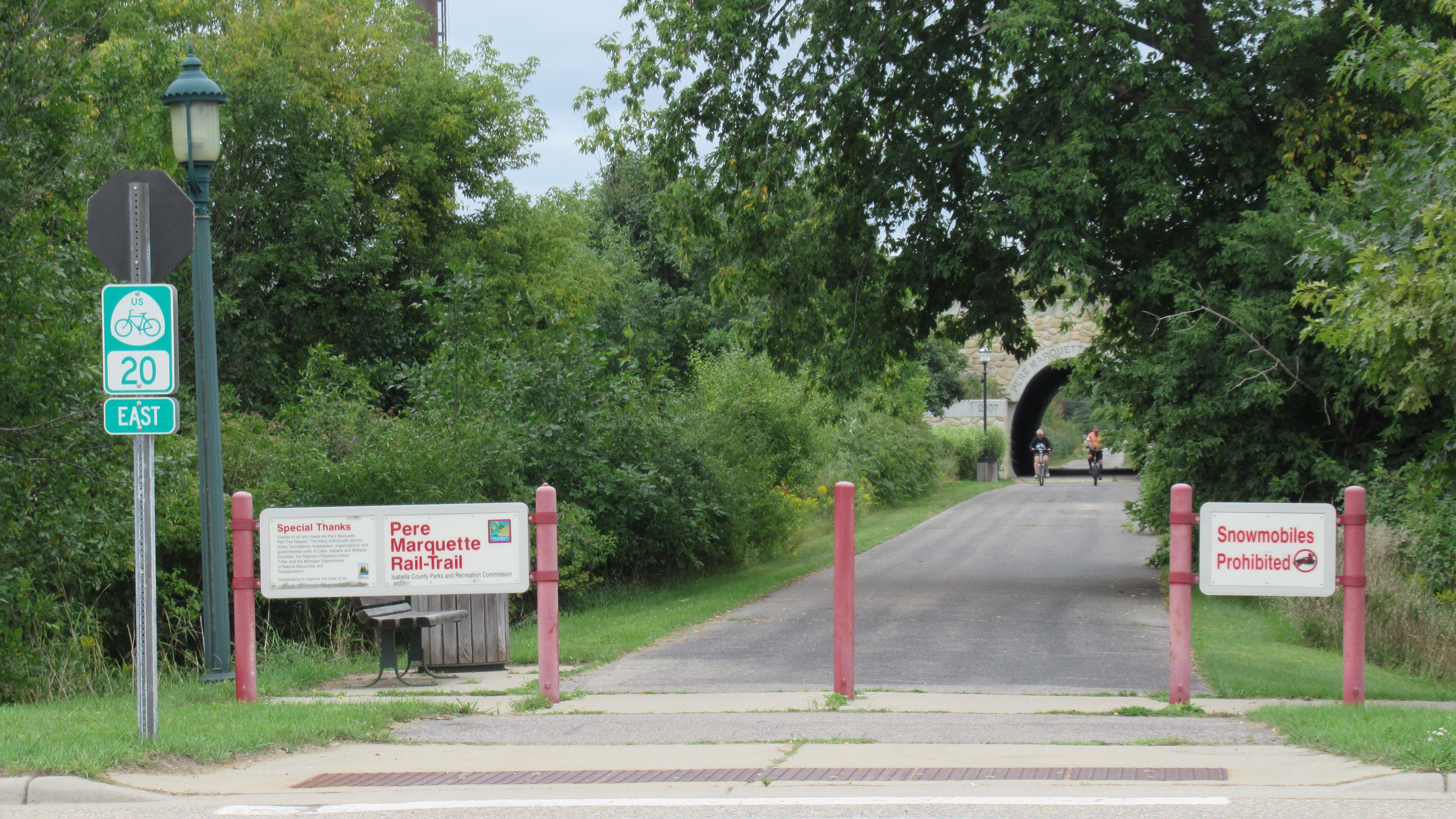
The trail in Clare passing underneath U.S. Route 127

The Pere Marquette Rail-Trail (PMRT) is a rail trail in Michigan occupying a 28-mile (45 km) abandoned CSX railroad corridor in Midland County and Isabella County that was once part of the Flint and Pere Marquette Railroad. In 1874, the tracks stretched from Ludington to Flint, transporting supplies to the timber industry in southern Michigan's mills. It is currently a Michigan Rails to Trails Conservancy Hall of Fame trail.

== History ==
In the late 1980s, William C. Gibson and Paul D. Pounders worked with the County of Midland's Parks and Recreation Department and were at the forefront of the creation of the trail.

The trail is named after the Flint and Pere Marquette Railroad, named after Jacques Marquette, a French Jesuit missionary who founded Michigan's first European settlement at Sault Ste. Marie. Père is the French word for father; ergo, Father Marquette.

The first portion of the trail opened in June 1993. This portion was almost wholly contained in the city of Midland and started at The Tridge.

== Location ==
Pere Marquette Rail-Trail
Location	Coordinates
Midland (The Tridge)	43°36′39.8″N 84°14′55.3″W
Clare (Fourth St. and Pine St.)	43°49′07.7″N 84°45′58.9″W

== See also ==
- The Tridge
