= Long Lake =

Long Lake may refer to:

== Cities, towns, places ==
=== Canada ===
- Long Lake, Alberta, hamlet
- Long Lake (oil sands), an oil sands upgrader project in Alberta
- Long Lake Provincial Park (Alberta)
- Long Lake Provincial Park (Nova Scotia)
- Long Lake, Frontenac County, Ontario, a community
- Long Lake, Thunder Bay District, Ontario, a first nations community
- Long Lake (electoral district), Saskatchewan

=== United States ===
- Long Lake, Illinois
  - Long Lake station
- Long Lake, Grand Traverse County, Michigan
- Long Lake, Iosco County, Michigan
- Long Lake, Minnesota
- Long Lake, New York, a town in Hamilton County
  - Long Lake (CDP), New York, a census-designated place in the town
- Long Lake, South Dakota
- Long Lake, Florence County, Wisconsin, a town
  - Long Lake (community), Florence County, Wisconsin, an unincorporated community in the town
- Long Lake, Washburn County, Wisconsin, a town
- Long Lake Township, Michigan
- Long Lake Township, Crow Wing County, Minnesota
- Long Lake Township, Watonwan County, Minnesota

== Lakes ==
=== Canada ===
- Long Lake (Athabasca County), Alberta
- Long Lake (Thorhild County), Alberta
- Long Lake (British Columbia), several lakes, including:
  - Long Lake (Smith Inlet)
  - Long Lake (Vancouver Island)
- Long Lake (Nova Scotia), several lakes
- Long Lake (Ontario), several lakes, including:
  - Long Lake (East Ferris, Ontario)
  - Long Lake (Kearney, Nipissing District, Ontario)
  - Long Lake (Lanark County)
  - Long Lake (Sharpe Township, Ontario)
- Long Lake, near Yellowknife, Northwest Territories, site of Fred Henne Territorial Park
- Long Lake (Saint-Alban), a tributary of the Noire River in Saint-Alban, Quebec
- Last Mountain Lake, Saskatchewan, also known as Long Lake

=== United States ===
- Long Lake (Arizona)
- Long Lake (Arkansas County, Arkansas), a lake in Arkansas County, Arkansas
- Long Lake (Calhoun County, Arkansas), a lake in Calhoun County, Arkansas
- Long Lake (Chicot County, Arkansas), a lake in Chicot County, Arkansas
- Long Lake (Clay County, Arkansas), a lake in Clay County, Arkansas
- Long Lake (Crittenden County, Arkansas), a lake in Crittenden County, Arkansas
- Long Lake (Dallas County, Arkansas), a lake in Dallas County, Arkansas
- Long Lake (Desha County, Arkansas), a lake in Desha County, Arkansas
- Long Lake (Independence County, Arkansas), a lake in Independence County, Arkansas
- Long Lake (Jefferson County, Arkansas), a lake in Jefferson County, Arkansas
- Long Lake (Illinois), a Superfund sites in Lake County, Illinois
- Long Lake (Indiana)
- Long Lake (Maine), in southern Maine
- Long Lake (Fish River), in northern Maine's Fish River chain of Lakes
- Long Lake (Michigan), index list
- Long Lake (Grant County, Minnesota)
- Long Lake in Beaverhead County, Montana
- Long Lake in Sheridan County, Montana
- Long Lake in Toole County, Montana
- Long Lake (Hamilton County, New York), a lake in Hamilton County
- Long Lake (Oneida County, New York), a lake on Oneida County
- Long Lake (Fine, St. Lawrence County, New York), a lake in St. Lawrence County
- Long Lake (Pitcairn, St. Lawrence County, New York), a lake in St. Lawrence County
- Long Lake (Codington County, South Dakota)
- Long Lake (Jerauld County, South Dakota)
- Long Lake (Lake County, South Dakota)
- Long Lake (Marshall County, South Dakota)
- Long Lake (McPherson County, South Dakota)
- Long Lake (Kitsap County, Washington)
- Long Lake (Thurston County, Washington)
- Long Lake (Wisconsin), a lake in Florence and Forest counties
- Long Lake Recreation Area, a lake and associated state park in Fond du Lac County, Wisconsin
- John D. Long Lake in South Carolina

== Fictional places ==
- Long Lake (Middle-earth), a lake south of the Lonely Mountain in J. R. R. Tolkien's fictional world of Middle-earth

== See also ==
- Rural Municipality of Longlaketon No. 219, Saskatchewan, Canada
- Lake Rotoroa (disambiguation) (Maori: "long lake"), various New Zealand lakes
- Long's Lake, Texas, artificial lake built by Benjamin Long
