= Long Lake (Alberta) =

Long Lake may refer to several lakes in Alberta:

- Long Lake (Athabasca County), a lake in Athabasca County, Alberta, Canada
- Long Lake (oil sands), an oil sands upgrader project in northeast Alberta, Canada
- Long Lake (Thorhild County), a lake in Thorhild County, Alberta, Canada
- Long Lake, Alberta, a hamlet in Thorhild County, Alberta, Canada
- Long Lake Provincial Park (Alberta), provincial park in Thorhild County, Alberta, Canada

== See also ==
- Long Lake (disambiguation)
