= Farry =

Farry may refer to:

== Places ==
- Farry Island, largest island in Long Lake in Lanark County in eastern Ontario, Canada

== People with the surname ==
- Anthony Farry, field hockey coach
- Eithne Farry, British editor
- Frank Farry (born 1972), American politician
- Gabriel Farry (1927–2017), Mayor of Gore, New Zealand
- Jackie Farry (1966–2025), American music manager and television host
- Jim Farry (1954–2010), Scottish football executive
- John Farry (born 1959), Northern Ireland singer and songwriter
- Marc Farry (born 1959), French golfer
- Stephen Farry (born 1971), Northern Ireland politician

== See also ==
- Farey (disambiguation)
- Fary (disambiguation)
