= Farey =

Farey is a surname. Notable people with the surname include:

- Cyril Farey (1888–1954), British architect and architectural illustrator
- John Farey Sr. (1766–1826), English geologist
- John Farey Jr. (1791–1851), English mechanical engineer, son of John Farey Sr.
- Joseph Farey (1796–1829), English mechanical engineer and draughtsman, son of John Farey Sr.
- Lizzie Farey (born 1962), Scottish artist

== See also ==
- Farey sequence, a mathematical construct named after John Farey Sr.
