= John Farey =

John Farey may refer to:

- John Farey Sr. (1766–1826), English geologist
- John Farey Jr. (1791–1851), his son, mechanical engineer

== See also ==
- John G. Fary, U.S. representative from Illinois
- John Farry, Northern Irish singer/songwriter
