= Long Lake, Ontario =

Long Lake, Ontario, may refer to:

- Long Lake, Thunder Bay District, Ontario
- Long Lake, Frontenac County, Ontario
- Long Lake (Ontario) (Lake)
