= Long Lake, Michigan =

Long Lake is the name of some unincorporated communities in the U.S. state of Michigan:

- Long Lake, Grand Traverse County, Michigan
- Long Lake, Iosco County, Michigan

== See also ==
- Long Lake (Michigan), for lakes of the same name
- Long Lake Township, Michigan, a township in Grand Traverse County.
