= Rotoroa =

Rotoroa may refer to:

- Rotoroa, Tasman, New Zealand
- Rotoroa Island, New Zealand

== See also ==
- Lake Rotoroa (disambiguation)
