= Clare County Airport =

Public use airport in Michigan, United States

- IATA: none; ICAO: none; FAA LID: 80D

Summary
- Owner/Operator: Clare County, Michigan
- Serves: Harrison, Michigan
- Location: Clare County, Michigan
- Time zone: UTC−05:00 (-5)
  - Summer (DST): UTC−04:00 (-4)
- Elevation AMSL: 1,142 ft (348 m)
- Coordinates: 44°03′09″N 084°48′47″W
- Interactive map of Clare County Airport

Runways
Direction	Length		Surface
Direction	ft	m	Surface
18/36	2,978	908	Asphalt
9/27	2,403	732	Turf

Statistics (2019)
- Aircraft Movements: 4,992

Clare County Airport (FAA LID: 80D) is a publicly owned, public use airport located two miles (3.2 km) northwest of Harrison in Clare County, Michigan. The airport sits on 80 acres (32 ha) at an elevation of 1,142 feet (348 m).

The airport plays host to a variety of community events, most notably the Dirt Dash Extreme Sport Races, which involves racing ATVs. It has also hosted military training exercises which allow community members close access to military aircraft and crewmembers, as well as easter festivities.

In early 2024, airport commissioners discussed whether to close the airport during the wintertime – due to the county's inability to clear snow – or whether doing so would harm airport businesses, such as the restaurant on airport property, too greatly.

== Facilities and aircraft ==
The airport has two runways. Runway 18/36 is the only one paved with asphalt. It measures 2,978 by 50 feet (908 m × 15 m). Runway 9/27 measures 2,403 by 100 feet (732 m × 30 m) and is also turf.

For the 12-month period ending December 31, 2019, the airport had 4,992 aircraft operations, an average of 96 per week, entirely general aviation. For the same time period, there were eight aircraft based at the airport, all single-engine airplanes.

=== Airport upgrades ===
In late 2014 and early 2015, when work on the pilot's lounge first began, the terminal's ductwork system was designed and constructed by students at the college technical center in Harrison.

In 2021, significant upgrades were made at the airport. The airport approved money for upgrades and the completion of a pilot's lounge at the airport. Upgrades to lighting at the airport were originally begun years earlier, but work on the pilot's lounge were paused because the hangar housing it is low-lying and therefore prone to flooding. Governing authorities waited for five years for a cost assessment on what extra repairs and building projects would cost.

In 2022, funds were approved to perform work on the airport's runway. However, the approved crack sealing was not fully completed by the third party contractor hired by the county to complete the work.

In 2024, the airport received a grant to remove trees from airport property to ensure a clear flight path for aircraft using the airport. Additional work is planned for the spring of 2024, including repairing the airport's rotating beacon, windsock, and turf runways.

In 2025, the airport received a grant to remove the old outdated runway lights and replace them with FAA approved lights. This grant however, was held from the airport for several months while multiple Clare County Commissioners argued over if they wanted to keep the airport open. However, on May 21st 2025, with a 7:2 vote, the board accepted the grant. Also in 2025, 5 servicemen from the Michigan Army National Guard 107th Engineer Battalion spent 5 days of their summer Guard training week conducting a survey of the airport property as part of an Innovative Readiness Training. IRT is a Department of Defense program that enables Guard members to work on enduring projects which benefit communities while simultaneously creating joint training opportunities to increase deployment readiness.

== Accidents and incidents ==
- On January 22, 2006, a Cessna 172 Skyhawk collided with the terrain following a loss of control near the Clair County Airport. Witnesses reported seeing the airplane flying low just above the trees near his house, which is about 1 mile north of the airport. This witness reported that the engine did not sound like it was running at full power, but it also didn't sound like the pilot was having any problems. A pilot who was at 80D reported that a Cessna 172 made a normal approach and touched down on runway 18 between 1430 and 1445. A medical examination after the crash found marijuana in the pilot's body, blood, and urine. The probable cause of the accident was found to be the pilot's failure to maintain adequate airspeed which resulted in an inadvertent stall. A factor associated with the accident was the pilot's impairment due to drugs.
- On November 5, 2021, a Vans RV-6 crashed 1 mile south of the approach end of Clare County's Runway 36. The aircraft had departed Oakland County International Airport in Pontiac and was in cruise flight when it crashed.

== See also ==
- List of airports in Michigan
