= Little Long Lake (Clare County, Michigan) =

Lake in the state of Michigan, United States

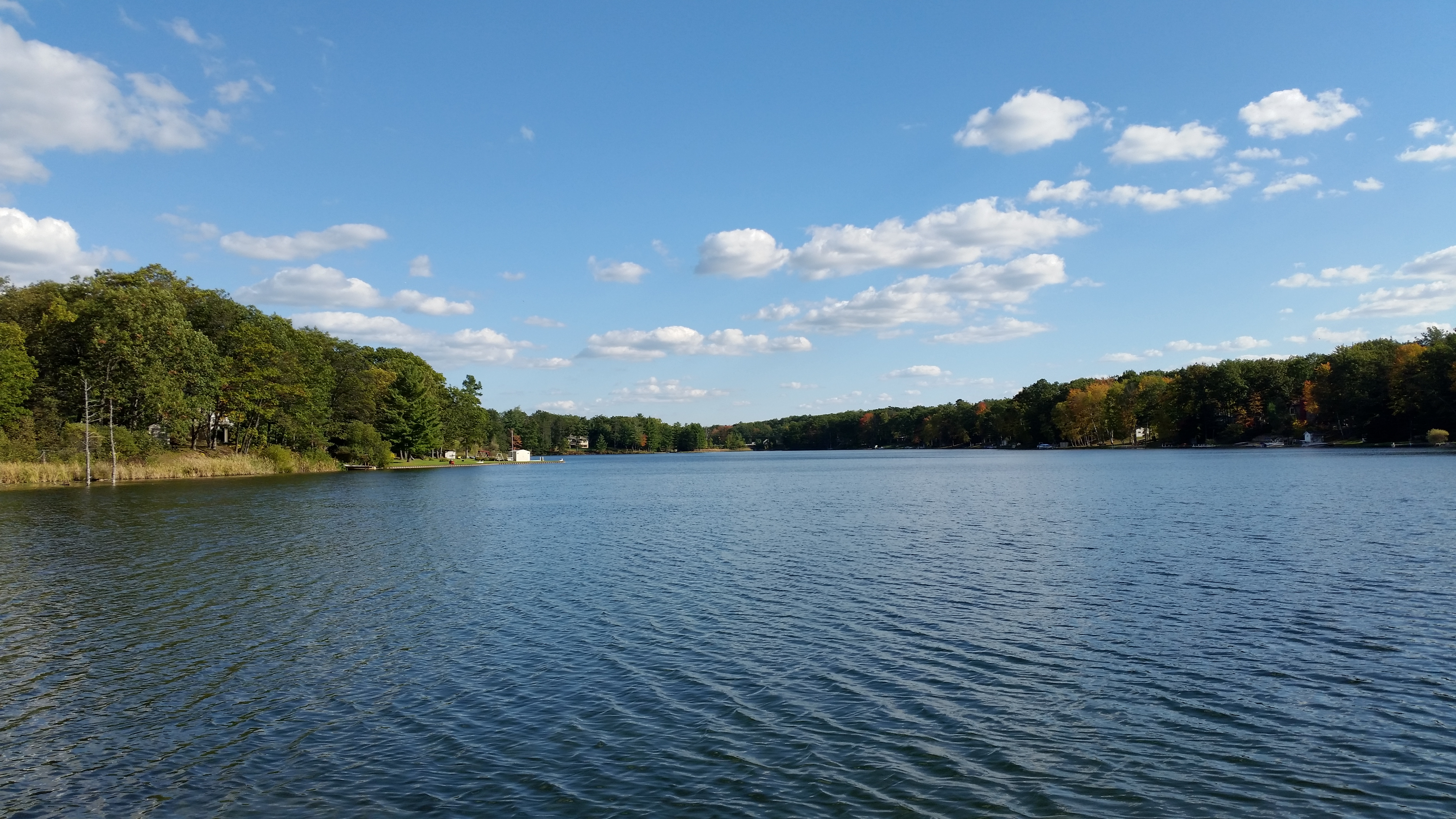
- View from the boating access site

- Location within the state of Michigan
- Location: Clare County, Michigan
- Coordinates: 44°01′36″N 84°47′06″W
- Type: Fresh water
- Basin countries: United States
- Surface area: 43 acres (17 ha)
- Max. depth: 50 feet (15.2 m)
- Surface elevation: 1,102 feet (336 m)
- Islands: none
- Settlements: Harrison, Hayes Township

Little Long Lake is a small fresh water lake located in Harrison and Hayes Township in Clare County in the U.S. state of Michigan. The lake encompasses 43 acres (17 ha). Little Long Lake is bisected by U.S. Highway 127, and a small canal travels under the highway to connect the two segments. Budd Lake is to the west, McWatty Lake is to the north, and Sutherland Lake is to the east. However, Little Long Lake does not connect to any other lake. Little Long Lake should not be confused with Long Lake slightly north in Frost Township or any of the other similarly named lakes in Michigan.

While the lake is mostly surrounded by private residences, there is one public access boat launch in the far northwest corner of the lake on Hammond Road. With depths of at least 50 feet (15 m), common fish in the lake include black crappie, brook and brown trout, bluegill, largemouth bass, northern pike, pumpkinseed, rock bass, and yellow perch.
