= Long Lake Provincial Park =

Long Lake Provincial Park may refer to:

- Long Lake Provincial Park (Alberta)
- Long Lake Provincial Park (Nova Scotia)
