= Long Lake (Ontario) =

There are 65 lakes known as Long Lake in Ontario, Canada.

== Algoma ==
- Long Lake (Varley Township, Ontario)
- Long Lake (Albanel Township, Ontario)
- Long Lake (The North Shore, Ontario)
- Long Lake (Fontaine Township, Ontario)
- Long Lake (Sampson Township, Ontario)
- Long Lake (Bruyere Township, Ontario)
- Long Lake (Common Township, Ontario)
- Long Lake (Huron Shores, Ontario)

== Cochrane ==
- Long Lake (Timmins)
- Long Lake (Potter Township, Ontario)

== Frontenac County ==
- Long Lake (South Frontenac, Ontario)
- Long Lake (Central Frontenac, Ontario)

== Greater Sudbury ==
- Long Lake (Eden Township, Ontario)
- Long Lake (Norman Township, Ontario)

== Haliburton County ==
- Long Lake (Highlands East, Ontario)
- Long Lake (Dysart et al, Ontario)

== Kenora ==
- Long Lake (Pelican Township, Ontario)
- Long Lake (Machin, Ontario)
- Long Lake (Kamungish River)
- Long Lake (Redvers Township, Ontario)
- Long Lake (Long Lake River)

== Manitoulin ==
- Long Lake (Central Manitoulin, Ontario)
- Long Lake (Northeastern Manitoulin and the Islands, Ontario)

== Muskoka ==
- Long Lake (Bracebridge, Ontario)
- Long Lake (Wood Township, Ontario) (Muskoka Lakes)
- Long Lake (Cardwell Township, Ontario) (Muskoka Lakes)

== Nipissing ==
- Long Lake (Kearney, Nipissing District, Ontario)
- Long Lake (East Ferris, Ontario)
- Long Lake (Calvin, Ontario)

== Parry Sound ==
- Long Lake (Humphrey Township, Ontario) (Seguin)
- Long Lake (Kearney, Parry Sound District, Ontario)
- Long Lake (Joly, Ontario)
- Long Lake (East Mills Township, Ontario)
- Long Lake (Wilson Township, Ontario)
- Long Lake (Nipissing, Ontario)
- Long Lake (The Archipelago, Ontario)
- Long Lake (Foley Township, Ontario) (Seguin)

== Peterborough County ==
- Long Lake (Douro-Dummer, Ontario)
- Long Lake (Havelock-Belmont-Methuen, Ontario)
- Long Lake (North Kawartha, Ontario)

== Rainy River ==
- Long Lake (Rainy River District, Ontario)

== Renfrew County ==
- Long Lake (Laurentian Valley, Ontario)
- Long Lake (Greater Madawaska, Ontario)
- Long Lake (Wylie Township, Ontario) (Laurentian Hills)
- Long Lake (Rolph Township, Ontario) (Laurentian Hills)

== Sudbury ==
- Long Lake (Sables-Spanish Rivers, Ontario)
- Long Lake (Ermatinger Township, Ontario)
- Long Lake (Kelly Township, Ontario)
- Long Lake (Turner Township, Ontario)

== Timiskaming ==
- Long Lake (Sharpe Township, Ontario)
- Long Lake (Lorrain Township, Ontario)
- Long Lake (Milner Township, Ontario)
- Long Lake (Lebel Township, Ontario)

== Thunder Bay ==
- Long Lake (Little Falls Lake)
- Long Lake (Laberge Township, Ontario)
- Long Lake (Shebandowan Lakes)
- Long Lake (Terrace Bay, Ontario)
- Long Lake (Shuniah, Ontario)
- Long Lake (Athelstane Lake)
- Long Lake (Thunder Bay District) (Longlac, Ojibwe: Ginoogamaa-zaaga’igan)

== Southern Ontario ==
- Long Lake (Lanark County)
- Long Lake (Simcoe County)
- Long Lake (Leeds and Grenville United Counties, Ontario)
- Long Lake (Kawartha Lakes)
- Long Lake (Hastings County)

== See also ==
- List of lakes in Ontario
