= Headbangers Ball =

Heavy metal music television program

- Classic logo
- Genre: Heavy metal; thrash metal; speed metal; black metal; death metal; doom metal; alternative metal; grunge (mid '90s); glam metal
- Presented by: Kevin Seal (1987–1988); Adam Curry (1988–1990); Riki Rachtman (1990–1995, 2021); Alfredo Lewin (1993–1997 in Latin America only); Vanessa Warwick (1990–1997 in Europe only); Jamey Jasta (2003–2007); Jose Mangin (2011–present; website only)
- Country of origin: United States
- Original language: English
- No. of episodes: 410

Production
- Editor: Danny Hinnenkamp
- Running time: 90 mins. (1988–1989); 120 mins. (1989–2008); 60 mins. (2011–present)

Original release
- Network: MTV; MTV2
- Release: April 18, 1987 – September 13, 2012

Related
- Heavy Metal Mania; Superock (1995)

Headbangers Ball is a music television program that consists of heavy metal music videos airing on MTV and its global affiliates. The show began on MTV on April 18, 1987, playing heavy metal music videos.

The show was ultimately canceled in 1995. Over eight years later the program was reintroduced on MTV2. It had remained in varying degrees on the network's website, but by the early 2020s, it was no longer shown on television.

== History ==
=== Hosts ===
"The Ball" replaced Heavy Metal Mania (which began airing monthly in June 1985), helmed by Dee Snider of Twisted Sister. In doing so, MTV expanded the format and added more live interviews with bands. At its premiere it was hosted briefly by Kevin Seal, then by VJ Adam Curry, before ultimately settling on Riki Rachtman.

=== Popularity and influence ===
The name "Headbangers Ball" was originally invented by DJ John Brent of Bury, Greater Manchester, and was used on his rock and metal roadshows from 1980 onwards . John's Headbangers Ball Rock charts were also regularly featured in the pages of Rock publications Kerrang! and Sounds along with multiple features on the show in local periodicals.

For some time in 1988 and 1989, the show was increased to 3 hours. Hard 60 was a daily version that aired for an hour every weekday afternoon.

Its influence was made widespread with the rise of heavy metal in the 1980s and early 1990s. While the program primarily showed videos from the mainstream friendly "hair metal" during the 1980s, it gave time to more aggressive-sounding heavy metal music from the late 1980s and early 1990s.

Three North American tours were presented by Headbangers Ball. The first in 1987 with Helloween, Armored Saint and Grim Reaper, the second (the 1989 tour) with Anthrax, Exodus and Helloween, and in 1992 with Megadeth and Suicidal Tendencies.

Heavier alternative rock acts, spearheaded by the likes of The Cult, Faith No More, Primus and Jane's Addiction, were finding increased residence on Headbangers Ball at the turn of the decade, but it was early into the 1990s that grunge and alternative rock bands like Nirvana, Pearl Jam, Soundgarden and Alice in Chains began to uproot the "hair metal" scene. Bands such as Stone Temple Pilots, White Zombie, Tool and Blind Melon would follow suit, resulting in a major shift in identity for the show, where metal mainstays such as Metallica, Megadeth, Pantera, Testament, Suicidal Tendencies and Dream Theater shared airspace with the new crop of alternative hard rock acts. Several punk rock bands, including the Ramones, The Offspring, Rancid, Bad Religion and Sick of It All, also received airplay on the show, which, by 1995, would continue to focus on less mainstream forms of heavy metal.

=== Road trips ===
Bands would visit the set for interviews, and in some instances, the show would follow bands on trips to assorted locations across the world. Road trip episodes include the Moscow Music Peace Festival with Ozzy Osbourne, Mötley Crüe, Bon Jovi, Skid Row, Cinderella and Gorky Park, Monsters of Rock in Donington, Alice in Chains' trip to Action Water Park, bowling with Soundgarden, skydiving with Megadeth, Oktoberfest in Munich with Danzig, and Van Halen's adventure at Cabo Wabo.

=== Death of The Ball ===
The show remained on the air until January 1995, when MTV canceled the show. The European version, hosted by Vanessa Warwick, was on the air until 1997, but limited to an hour and a half (as opposed to the three hours given in past years).

Host Riki Rachtman was informed of the cancellation when, after filming what would end up being the final episode, he was informed via phone call that he would not have to show up to work the following week.

The demise of The Ball also came in at #4 on VH1's 40 Least Metal Moments in 2005. In mid-February The Ball was replaced by the short-lived Superock, a show featuring videos and interviews with metal, alternative and rap artists.

=== Rebirth ===
Headbangers Ball volume 2 logo

After nearly a decade of the show being off the air, MTV2 started up the series again on Saturday, May 10, 2003, at 11 p.m. The revived Headbangers Ball initially had the same type of playlist as its latter "sister shows" in MTV Europe, as well as interviews with metal artists (current and classic). The debut episode was hosted by Metallica, a trend which continued with various artists. Later on, Hatebreed vocalist Jamey Jasta became a permanent host. However, the show still continued to have guest host artists at times. The show eventually returned to its roots (in types of music) of showing underground music, as well as metalcore, Hardcore death metal and thrash.

During VH1's 40 Least Metal Moments countdown, musicians criticized the 2003 incarnation of Headbangers Ball in comparison with the original, citing its "scripted" studio feel and lack of excitement. The new version mostly shows only music videos and in-studio interviews, which was not true of the original show.

When asked in September 2015 about a possible return of Headbangers Ball, former host Riki Rachtman stated, "It's not gonna happen. I tried, I told them I would do it for free, they never even returned my calls."

Although the show has not been on the air for years, there have been European tours called "MTV Headbangers Ball" since 2016, with the exception of 2020 and 2021 due to the COVID-19 pandemic; this tour package traditionally takes place from late November to mid-December, and features four metal bands. The European "MTV Headbangers Ball" tour has included mostly thrash metal bands such as Exodus, Overkill, Death Angel, Sodom, Vio-lence, Artillery, Xentrix, Whiplash and Suicidal Angels ‒ as well as other acts like Max + Igor Cavalera, Iced Earth, Kataklysm, Insomnium, Ensiferum, Unearth, Deserted Fear, Whitechapel, Fleshgod Apocalypse and Dyscarnate ‒ as a headlining or opening act; the only band so far that has taken part of the tour more than once is Kataklysm. The concept of the MTV Headbangers Ball Tour in Europe was possibly inspired by the 1989 US tour with the same name that included Anthrax, Helloween and Exodus.

==== Removal of the show from Headbangers Ball ====
Since the January 13, 2007, episode, Headbangers Ball simply became the title for a block of metal videos, rather than an actual show. However, the June 23, 2007, episode went behind the scenes of the induction of Pantera guitarist "Dimebag" Darrell Abbott at the Hollywood's RockWalk, including segments covering the event in between music videos. Also, brief interview segments still frequently air before and after commercial breaks, typically re-airing on several consecutive episodes for a long period.

On April 14, 2007, MTV2 began to air the show from 11 p.m. to 1 a.m. and put Saturday Rock the Deuce, a hard rock–alternative show, at 10. The week's episode was also re-aired on Tuesday mornings from 4:00 to 6:00 a.m.

Starting in 2008, Headbangers Ball had been aired erratically, sometimes airing several hours later than its normal airtime or not being aired at all. Its last on-air time slot was Tuesdays 3AM-4AM.

On July 21, 2011, Jose Mangin took over as host of Headbangers Ball, which is now a web-only show.

==== The Ball ====
On March 17, 2021, it was announced that Rachtman would be hosting The Ball, airing on Gimme Metal TV and presented by Knotfest.com. The show has Rachtman playing classic heavy metal music videos from bands like Megadeth, Metallica and Power Trip. The first episode premiered on March 27, 2021.

== Discography ==
Headbangers Ball labeled products, including a guitar tabs book and three CD sets including artists such as Hatebreed, Opeth, DevilDriver, God Forbid, Chimaira, Dirge Within, Sevendust, Lacuna Coil, Atreyu, Mushroomhead, Shadows Fall, Children of Bodom, Lamb of God, A Life Once Lost, Cradle of Filth, Deftones, and Godsmack have also been sold.

Each album has at least one live song. The first Headbangers Ball compilation featured "Raining Blood" by Slayer as its live track, the second compilation used an in-studio performance of "My Tortured Soul" by Probot, and the latest compilation had two live tracks: "A Bid Farewell" by Killswitch Engage and "Now You've Got Something To Die For" by Lamb of God. The earliest-released CD has famous bands, and the second has obscure ones. Songs featuring Slipknot band members Corey Taylor and Joey Jordison appeared on all three CDs through their other bands. Other bands that have appeared on all three compilations include Killswitch Engage, Lamb of God, and In Flames.

- MTV2 Headbangers Ball (2003)
- MTV2 Headbangers Ball Volume 2 (2004)
- MTV2 Headbangers Ball: The Revenge (2006)
