= All Saints' Church, Isleworth =

All Saints' Church
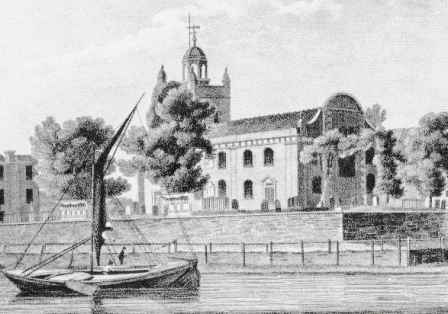
- All Saints in the early 19th century
- All Saints' Church
- 51.4717°N 0.3198°W
- Location: Isleworth
- Country: England
- Denomination: Church of England
- Previous denomination: Roman Catholicism
- Website: allsaints-isleworth.org

Architecture
- Heritage designation: Grade II*
- Designated: 15 June 1951

All Saints' Church is the oldest parish church in Isleworth in the London Borough of Hounslow in southwest London.

Its 14th-century Kentish ragstone tower and foundations are the only pre–20th-century parts to survive. It faces the Thames before Church Street skirts away from the river to pass Syon Park. The parish itself is pre-Norman. A vicar replacing its rector is recorded in 1290 in records associated with Syon Abbey who gave his family £2 and a new robe each year and daily meat and drink at the upper table in the abbey hall, while his servant was to be fed at the grooms' table. The patron of the church became the trustees of St George's Chapel, Windsor, due to the dissolution of the monasteries.

By the end of the 17th century, Sir Christopher Wren was approached to draw plans for a new body of a much-dilapidated building. His project was deemed too expensive until 1705, when Sir Orlando Gee (MP), of Syon Hill in the parish, left £500 towards the work in his will; he is commemorated in a marble monument by Francis Bird. This sum, combined with funds raised through subscriptions, ensured that the work took place (with modifications) in 1705–1706.

The music theorist Marmaduke Overend served as organist from 1760 to 1790. In 1943 a large fire, started by two boys who a few days later set fire to Holy Trinity Church in Hounslow, led to complete internal reconstruction in lighter materials. The inner body of the present church was built in 1970 by the architect Michael Blee, who designed much of Douai Abbey, and the glazier Keith New; the 15th-century stone tower was retained. The Grade II* listed church won a Civic Trust Award in 1973.
