= Marmaduke Overend =

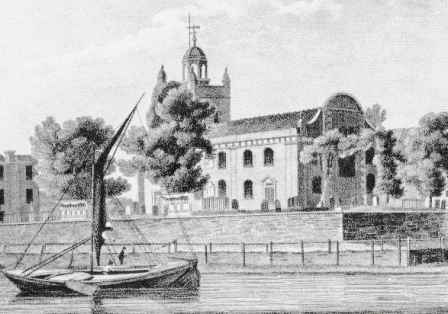
All Saints, Isleworth as Overend knew it

Marmaduke Overend (c. 1730 – 1790) was a Welsh music theorist and organist. He served as Organist at All Saints Church, Isleworth for thirty years.

He was a pupil of William Boyce, (1711–79). Boyce had been a pupil Johann Christoph Pepusch (1666/7–1752), who was greatly interested in Greek music and the music of antiquity: Boyce followed this interest. On Boyce's death, Overend bought his teacher's manuscripts. Overend constructed elaborate mathematical tables noting the relationship between note values, or intervals. He assisted John Hawkins by transcribing early musical examples for inclusion in the latter's History of Music, 1776.

He published in 1781 a prospectus for a series of lectures on the science of music, titled A Brief account of, and an introduction to, eight lectures, in the Science of Music ... . Marmaduke Overend died at Isleworth on 25 June 1790, describing himself in his will as 'Student of Music' (ODNB); Laetitia Matilda Hawkins, described him as the "Scientific Organist of Isleworth".

Following Overend's death, his library was sold in 1791 by Egerton Bros. His manuscript volumes, as well as Boyce's treatise, were bought by John Wall Callcott, (1766–1821) who used these manuscripts as sources for his own work. In 1807, Callcott donated all the manuscripts to the Royal Institution, where they were consulted by John Farey Sr and informed his writings on music theory in Rees's Cyclopædia and the Edinburgh Encyclopaedia: the manuscripts include Farey's MS notes. Farey's writings in the two works comprise more than 350 articles.

The manuscripts were moved in 1972 to the Bodleian Library, Overend MS. Don c.136-42. They comprise now one volume by Boyce, six by Overend and two by Callcott, nine volumes in all, but Farey noted in his article on the Farey Notation, Edinburgh Encyclopaedia, vol 9, p. 274, that he consulted fourteen volumes, so it must be presumed that five have been lost.

A brief life by W. H. Hadow was published in the 2nd edition of Grove. It lists his compositions and mentions his work on musical theory and his manuscripts. It is very similar to the account of him by Louisa M. Middleton in the DNB, updated by K. D. Reynolds in the ODNB and Jamie C. Kassler in the New Grove.

== Compositions ==
- An Epithalaneum for the marriage of the marriage of George III in 1761
- Twelve sonatas for two violins and a violincello, 1779
- A canon for eight voices, Glory be to the Father, was printed by Thomas Warren in a volume of his annual collection of Catches, Canons and Glees. (1763–1794)
- A Hunting Cantata (c. 1780)
