= Wilson State Park (Michigan) =

State Park in Clare County, Michigan

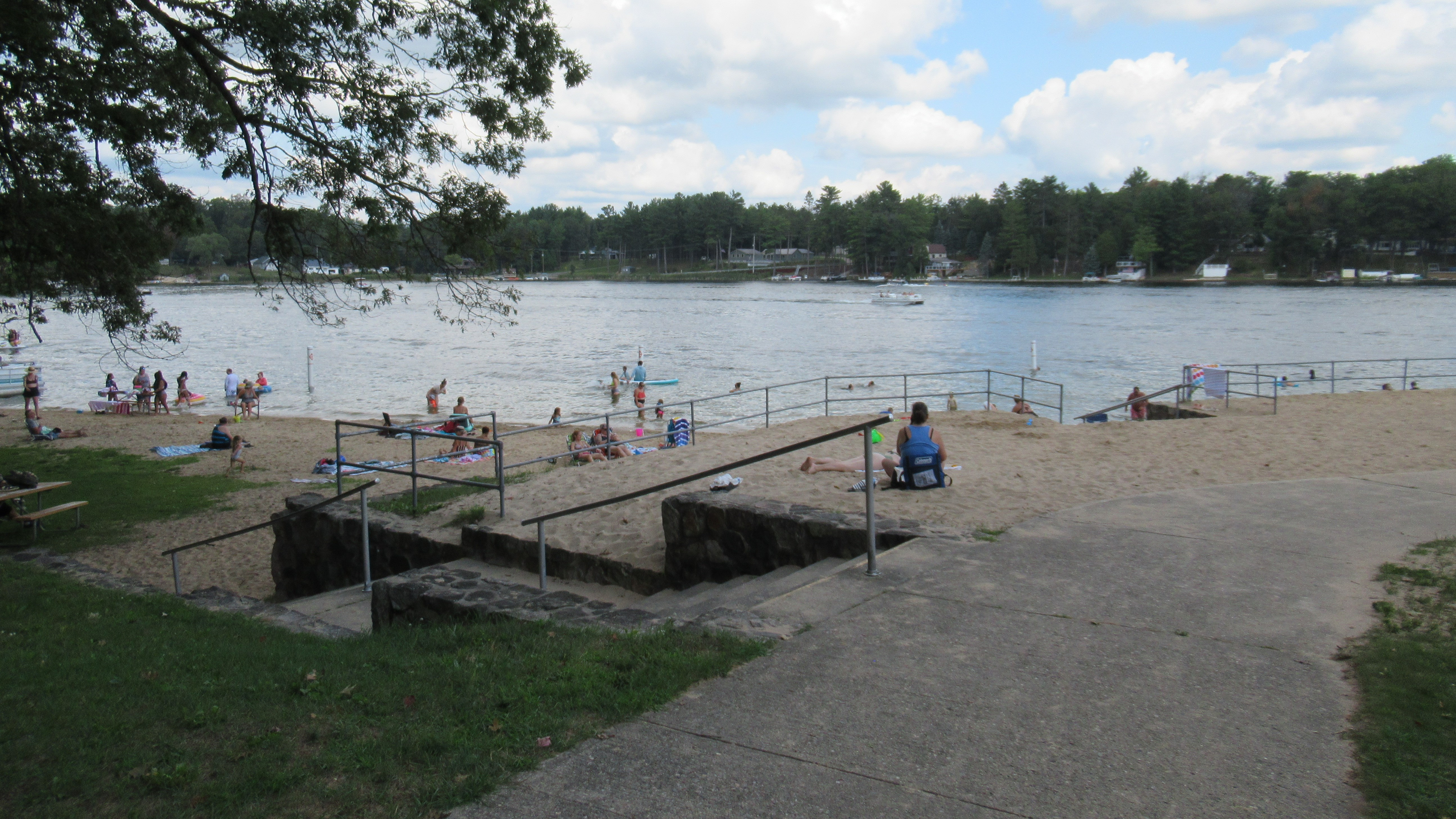
- Beachfront along Budd Lake

- Location within Michigan Location within the United States
- Location: Harrison, Michigan, United States
- Coordinates: 44°01′44″N 84°48′16″W
- Area: 36 acres (15 ha)
- Elevation: 1,158 feet (353 m)
- Established: 1920
- Administrator: Michigan Department of Natural Resources
- Designation: Michigan state park
- Website: Official website

Wilson State Park is a state park located within the city limits of Harrison in the U.S. state of Michigan. The park occupies 36 acres (15 ha) along the shores of Budd Lake.

== History ==
The Michigan Department of Natural Resources lists the park among thirteen state parks established in 1920 following creation of the Michigan State Parks Commission in 1919. Land for the park was donated to the city of Harrison in 1900 by a lumber company, then transferred to the state in 1922. The state park was dedicated in 1927. The Civilian Conservation Corps was active in the park from 1939 to 1941.

== Activities and amenities ==
The state park offers swimming, picnicking, fishing for muskellunge, bass, panfish, perch and walleye, camping, and lodge.
