= Joseph Farey =

English engineer (1796–1829)

- Born: 1766; Potsgrove, Bedfordshire
- Died: 1829 (aged 62–63); Paris, France
- Parents: John Farey, Sr. (father); Sophia Hubert (mother)
- Relatives: John Farey, Jr. (Brother)

Joseph Farey (1796–1829) was an English mechanical engineer and draughtsman.

He was the third son of John Farey, Sr. (1766–1826) and Sophia Hubert (1770–1830) and was born at Potsgrove, Bedfordshire. He was the brother of John Farey, Jr.

Nothing is known of his education, but he was a talented draughtsman. He was part of the family business of assisting inventors in developing new machines and preparing patent specifications, and for publishers preparing descriptive texts and drawings. As well as technical and scientific periodicals he helped illustrate Rees's Cyclopædia (1802–1819), Smeaton's Reports, (1812), Pantologia (1808) and the British Encyclopedia, or Dictionary of Arts and Sciences 1808.

He became a member of the Institution of Civil Engineers in 1822, and in July 1825 became paralysed from an infected minor flesh wound. In that year he took out a patent for an oil lamp (Woodcroft No 5214). He died in 1829 in Paris.
