= Superock =

- Genre: Music (rock, heavy metal, alternative, alternative rap)
- Presented by: Jackie Farry (MTV), Julia Valet (MTV Europe and MTV UK)
- Countries of origin: United States and Europe
- Original language: English

Production
- Running time: 120 minutes

Original release
- Network: MTV, MTV Europe, MTV UK
- Release: February 18, 1995 (MTV); June 2, 1997 (MTV Europe) From July 1997 (MTV UK)

Related
- Headbangers Ball

Superock is a music television show that focuses on rock music, heavy metal music, alternative rock and alternative rap.

== History ==
Superock first aired on MTV in the US on February 18, 1995 and it replaced the long running Headbangers Ball show. Cashbox magazine reported on January 25, 1995 that Superock would "combine rock, hard-edged alternative and alternative rap music and look at the new lifestyle trends of today's music fans and the bands they follow". The presenter of the US version of the show was Jackie Farry, who had previously been the nanny to Frances Bean Cobain, daughter of Nirvana frontman Kurt Cobain and Courtney Love. It aired on Saturday nights from midnight to 2 a.m.

Superock first aired on MTV Europe on June 2, 1997 where it also replaced Headbangers Ball which had been discontinued there a year before. The presenter on the MTV Europe version of Superock was the German Julia Valet. Among the music videos that were aired on the first Superock show on MTV Europe were "A.D.I.D.A.S." by Korn, "Vow" by Garbage, "Love You to Death" by Type O Negative, "Doctor Jeep" by The Sisters of Mercy, "Poison" by The Prodigy and "The Beautiful People" by Marilyn Manson. In the UK, it aired on Mondays at 11 p.m on MTV Europe.

== See also ==
- Alternative Nation
