= Fary =

Fary may refer to:

Fary may refer to one of the following:

- El Fary (1937–2007), Spanish singer and actor
- István Fáry, a Hungarian mathematician, the namesake of the Fáry's theorem
- John G. Fary (1911–1984), U.S. Representative from Illinois.
- Fary Faye (born 1974), football forward from Senegal

== See also ==
- Farry (disambiguation)
- Fairy
