= Lake Rotoroa =

Lake Rotoroa (Māori: "long lake") may refer to the following New Zealand lakes:

- Lake Rotoroa (Northland)
- Lake Rotoroa (Tasman)
- Lake Rotoroa (Hamilton) (or "Hamilton Lake"), Hamilton City, Waikato, New Zealand
- Lake Rotoroa (Waitomo), Waitomo District, Waikato, New Zealand

== See also ==
- Long Lake (disambiguation)
- Lake Rotorua
