= Long Lake (Kitsap County, Washington) =

Lake in Kitsap County, Washington, United States

- Location within Washington (state) Location within the United States
- Location: Port Orchard, Kitsap County, Washington
- Coordinates: 47°29′06″N 122°35′24″W
- Basin countries: United States
- Surface elevation: 121 ft (37 m)

Long Lake, at 2 miles (3.2 km) long and 2,000 feet (610 m) across at its widest, is the largest body of freshwater in Port Orchard, Kitsap County, in the U.S. state of Washington.

== History ==
The lake drew homesteaders in the late 1800s for sunbathing and swimming, and a century later people still come for recreational enjoyment. The lake was primarily known by word of mouth, and locals occasionally came to enjoy its waters.

== Development ==
The recent development of houses in the area has muddied the waters with silt and chemicals, and the quality of the lake is decreasing. As some residents mention, "Today you can't see four feet. I see the lake getting shallower and shallower, then they'll pave it over and put a Kmart in the middle." The concern for rapid development has angered some locals, but some people do not mind because it is good for business. It is a relatively large issue for the community, and the quality of the lake has decreased over time.

== Club House ==
"The club is on the site of the former school building, built by homesteaders in 1891. The land was donated by 'Dad' Williams and students in grades one through eight attended. After World War II, at a time when schools were being consolidated, the school was sold for $1. The only stipulation was whoever bought the schoolhouse would use it for a community club and no other purpose." The clubhouse is now used as a community center that allows for an event venue and gathering space.

== Recreation ==
The lake is used for fishing, water sport recreation, swimming, and a park area for the locals. The beach is used in the summer as a swimming spot and a place to relax.

== Fishing ==
Long Lake is good fishing for Coastal Cutthroat in spring. "Large-mouth Bass and Yellow Perch fishing is good herein Spring into Summer, with Bluegill Sunfish and Black Crappie fishing fair-to-good in late Summer into Fall." Bass fishing is king, and there are legends of a mythical fish named Walter, the biggest bass in the lake. Fishing is allowed by both motorized and non-motorized vehicles. Fishing at the county park is allowed only between April 1 and September 30.

== Environmental Concerns ==
Long Lake has seen a myriad of environmental concerns and repeatedly must close due to noxious invasive weeds, parasites, algae, and even E. coli. This is due to runoffs, chemicals, environmental imbalances, and other environmental hazards infecting the waters. At first, the lake was maintained by the Citizens for Improving Long Lake; the committee has since run out of funds, and the lake is subject to continued and increasing watershed issues.
