= Long Lake (Wisconsin) =

Lake in Wisconsin, United States

- Location in Wisconsin
- Location: Florence and Forest Counties, Wisconsin, United States
- Coordinates: 45°50′20″N 88°40′32″W
- Surface area: 337 acres (136 ha)
- Max. depth: 21 feet (6.4 m)
- Surface elevation: 1,513 feet (461 m)

Long Lake is a lake in Florence County and Forest County, in the U.S. state of Wisconsin. Long Lake is a 3478 acre lake located in Washburn County. It has a maximum depth of 74 feet.

Long Lake was so named from the fact it is longer than it is wide, and longer than the other nearby lakes.

== See also ==
- List of lakes in Wisconsin
