= Long Lake, Alberta =

Long Lake
- Hamlet
- Location of Long Lake Long Lake (Canada)
- Coordinates: 54°28′15″N 112°46′12″W
- Country: Canada
- Province: Alberta
- Region: Central Alberta
- Census division: 13
- Municipal district: Thorhild County

Government
  - Type: Unincorporated
  - Governing body: Thorhild County Council

Area (2021)
  - Land: 2.08 km^{2} (0.80 sq mi)

Population (2021)
  - Total: 81
  - Density: 39/km^{2} (100/sq mi)
- Time zone: UTC−06:00 (Alberta Time)
- Area codes: 780, 587, 825

Long Lake is a hamlet in central Alberta, Canada within Thorhild County. It is located on the west shore of Long Lake, approximately 12 kilometres (7.5 mi) east of Highway 63 and 114 kilometres (71 mi) northeast of Edmonton.

== Demographics ==
Population history of Long Lake
Year	Pop.	±%
1986	19	—
1991	28	+47.4%
1991A	28	+0.0%
1996	37	+32.1%
2001	65	+75.7%
2006	101	+55.4%
2011	74	−26.7%
2016	63	−14.9%
2021	81	+28.6%
Source: Statistics Canada

In the 2021 Census of Population conducted by Statistics Canada, Long Lake had a population of 81 living in 43 of its 177 total private dwellings, a change of 28.6% from its 2016 population of 63. With a land area of 2.08 km^{2} (0.80 sq mi), it had a population density of 38.9/km^{2} (100.9/sq mi) in 2021.

As a designated place in the 2016 Census of Population conducted by Statistics Canada, Long Lake had a population of 63 living in 31 of its 165 total private dwellings, a change of −14.9% from its 2011 population of 74. With a land area of 1.96 km^{2} (0.76 sq mi), it had a population density of 32.1/km^{2} (83.2/sq mi) in 2016.

== See also ==
- List of communities in Alberta
- List of designated places in Alberta
- List of hamlets in Alberta
