= Jackie Farry =

American tour manager (1966–2025)

- Born: Jacquelyn Beth Farry; May 6, 1966; New York, U.S.
- Died: January 12, 2025 (aged 58)
- Occupations: Tour manager; Record label executive; Television host; Nanny
- Spouse: Aimee Swartz (married 2017)

Jacquelyn Beth Farry (May 6, 1966 – January 12, 2025) was an American tour manager and veteran of the 1990s music industry. She was associated with artists including Nirvana, The Lemonheads, Jon Spencer Blues Explosion, Elliott Smith, and Stereolab. Close to Kurt Cobain and Courtney Love, Farry was Frances Bean Cobain's first nanny.

== Life and career ==
Farry was born in New York and raised in the Synanon community. She began her music industry career at Homestead, and later worked in promotion at Epic and Atlantic Records. She was a host of Superock, which aired on MTV in North America and Europe from 1995–1997.

She was diagnosed with a rare form of cancer in 2003, and died of complications of lung disease on January 12, 2025, at the age of 58.
