= Harrison, Michigan =

- City
- City of Harrison
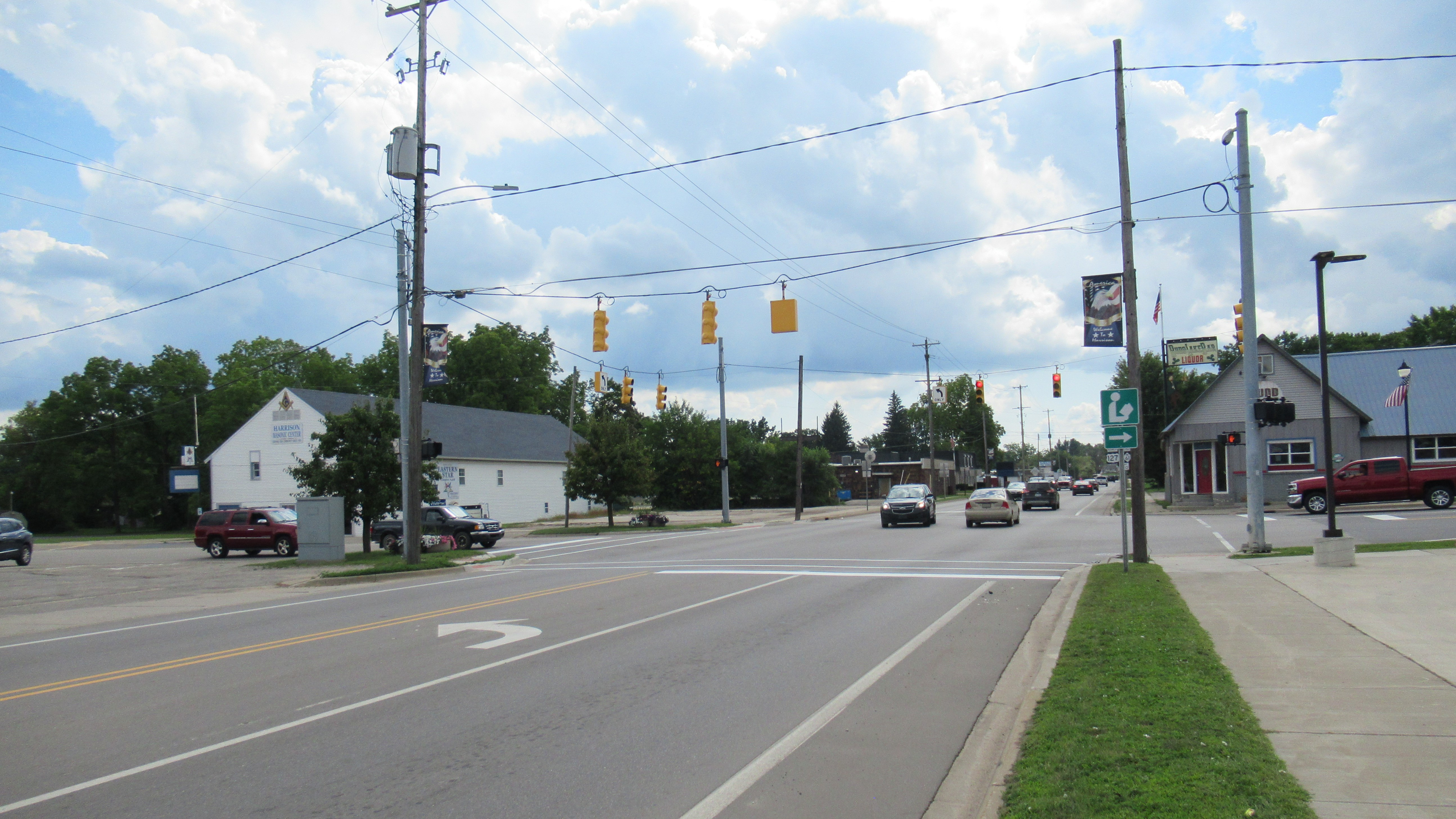
- Looking south along 1st and Main Street
- Motto: "20 Lakes in 20 Minutes"
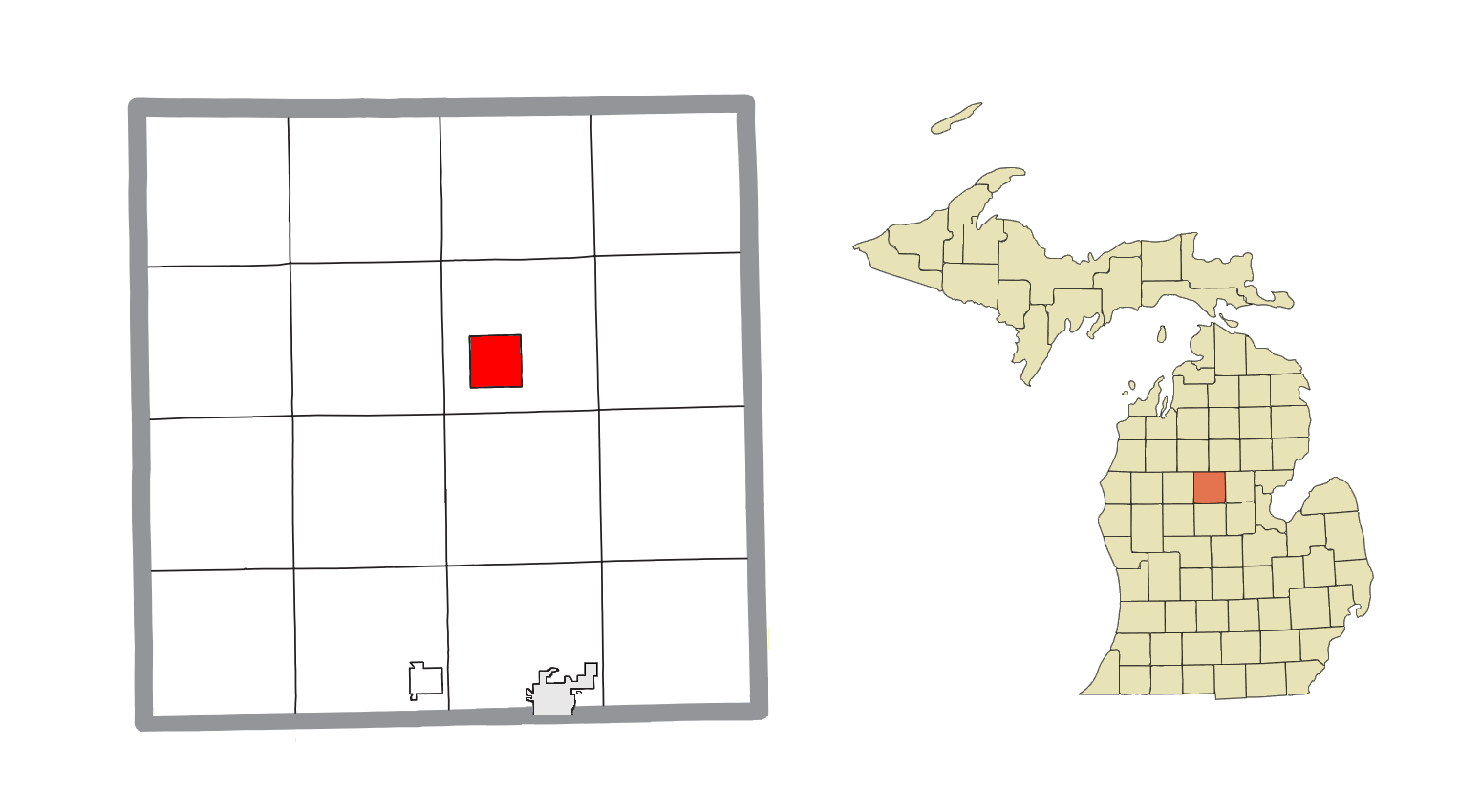
- Location within Clare County

- Location within the state of Michigan Location within the United States
- Coordinates: 44°01′16″N 84°48′02″W
- Country: United States
- State: Michigan
- County: Clare
- Settled: 1877
- Platted: 1879
- Incorporated: 1885 (village); 1891 (city)

Government
  - Type: Mayor–council
  - Mayor: Dan Sullivan
  - Manager: Justin Cavanaugh

Area
  - Total: 4.03 sq mi (10.43 km^{2})
  - Land: 3.71 sq mi (9.62 km^{2})
  - Water: 0.31 sq mi (0.81 km^{2})
- Elevation: 1,165 ft (355 m)

Population (2020)
  - Total: 2,150
  - Density: 578.7/sq mi (223.44/km^{2})
- Time zone: UTC-5 (Eastern (EST))
  - Summer (DST): UTC-4 (EDT)
- ZIP code(s): 48625
- Area code: 989
- FIPS code: 26-36800
- GNIS feature ID: 0627850
- Website: cityofharrison-mi.gov

Harrison is a city in and county seat of Clare County, Michigan, United States. The population was 2,150 at the 2020 census.

The community was settled as early as 1877 and was named after William Henry Harrison. Wilson State Park and Budd Lake are located within the city.

== History ==
Harrison was first designated as the new centralized location of the county seat of Clare County in 1877. It would become a replacement for Farwell, which was the first county seat when Clare County was formally organized in 1871. The Flint and Pere Marquette Railroad platted the village in 1879 and set aside property for a new county government after the previous courthouse in Farwell burned down. The Harrison post office opened on January 27, 1880 and was named after former president William Henry Harrison. The new community incorporated as a village in 1885 and later as a city in 1891.

== Geography ==
According to the U.S. Census Bureau, the city has a total area of 4.03 square miles (10.44 km^{2}), of which 3.71 square miles (9.61 km^{2}) is land and 0.31 square miles (0.80 km^{2}) is water.

The city's motto is "20 Lakes in 20 Minutes" due its proximity to numerous lakes. Budd Lake is mostly located within the city limits, while the northern coastline extends into Hayes Township. The only other lake within the city limits is Little Long Lake, which also extends into Hayes Township.

=== Major highways ===
- US 127 runs south–north just outside the eastern border of the city.
- Bus. US 127 is a business route of US 127 that runs through the center of the city.
- M-61 is a state highway that enters the west-central part of the city and then runs concurrently with Bus. US 127.

== Demographics ==
Historical population
Census	Pop.	Note	%±
1880	129		—
1890	752		482.9%
1900	647		−14.0%
1910	543		−16.1%
1920	399		−26.5%
1930	458		14.8%
1940	727		58.7%
1950	884		21.6%
1960	1,072		21.3%
1970	1,460		36.2%
1980	1,700		16.4%
1990	1,835		7.9%
2000	2,108		14.9%
2010	2,114		0.3%
2020	2,150		1.7%
U.S. Decennial Census

=== 2020 census ===
As of the 2020 census, Harrison had a population of 2,150. The median age was 41.7 years. 20.9% of residents were under the age of 18 and 21.8% of residents were 65 years of age or older. For every 100 females there were 97.2 males, and for every 100 females age 18 and over there were 95.9 males age 18 and over.

80.5% of residents lived in urban areas, while 19.5% lived in rural areas.

There were 934 households in Harrison, of which 25.4% had children under the age of 18 living in them. Of all households, 30.3% were married-couple households, 19.9% were households with a male householder and no spouse or partner present, and 37.8% were households with a female householder and no spouse or partner present. About 40.1% of all households were made up of individuals and 19.4% had someone living alone who was 65 years of age or older.

There were 1,264 housing units, of which 26.1% were vacant. The homeowner vacancy rate was 4.5% and the rental vacancy rate was 4.3%.

Racial composition as of the 2020 census
Race	Number	Percent
White	1,984	92.3%
Black or African American	37	1.7%
American Indian and Alaska Native	21	1.0%
Asian	6	0.3%
Native Hawaiian and Other Pacific Islander	0	0.0%
Some other race	8	0.4%
Two or more races	94	4.4%
Hispanic or Latino (of any race)	43	2.0%

== Education ==
The city of Harrison is served entirely by Harrison Community Schools, which is centrally located within the city and serves a large part of the northern portion of the county.

Mid Michigan Community College has a Harrison campus located just to the southeast in Hatton Township.
