= Budd Lake (Michigan) =

Lake in the state of Michigan, United States

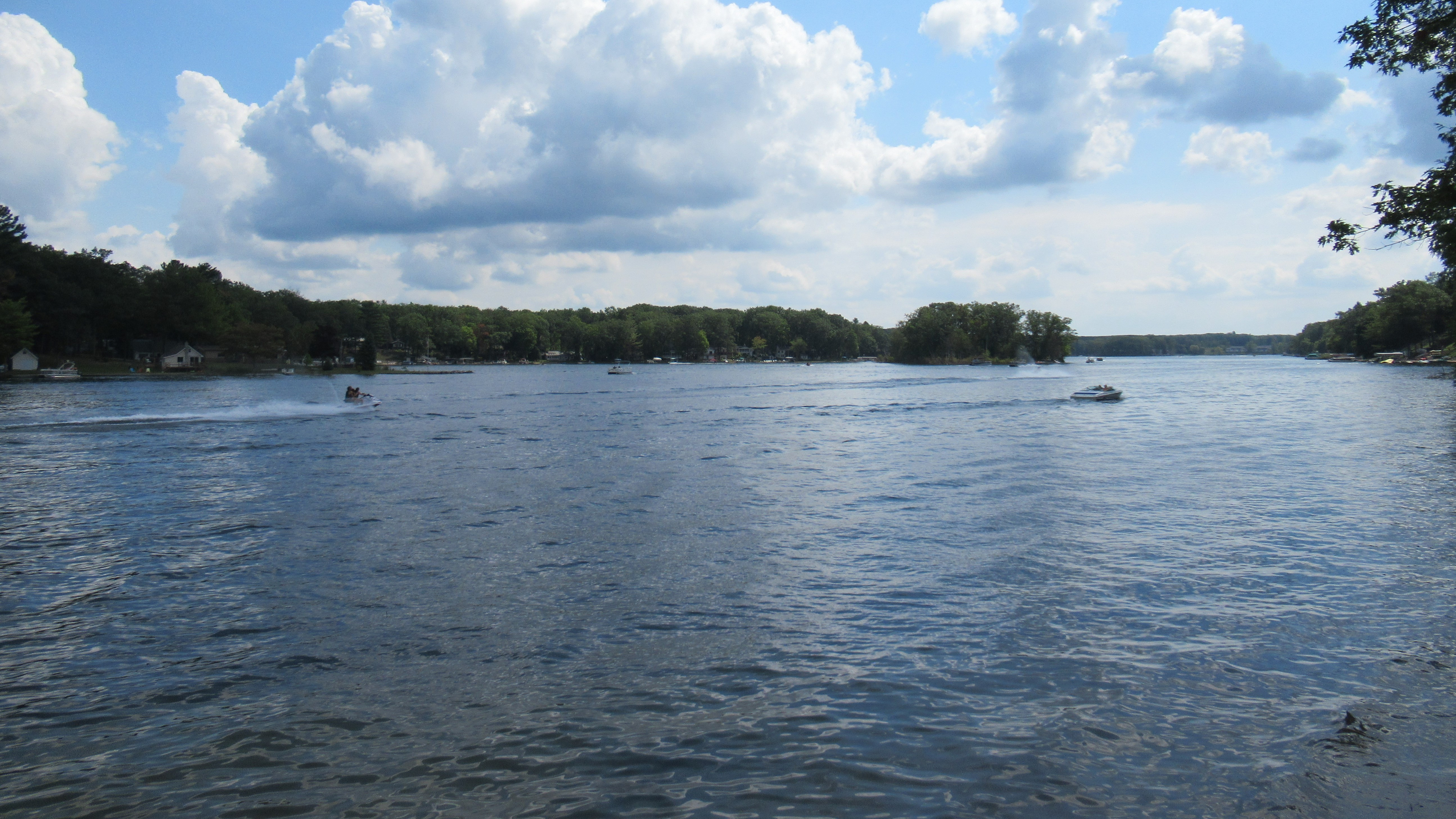
- Looking south from Wilson State Park

- Location within Michigan Location within the United States
- Location: Clare County, Michigan
- Coordinates: 44°01′22″N 84°47′48″W
- Type: Lake
- Basin countries: United States
- Max. length: 1.4 mi (2,300 m)
- Max. width: 0.25 mi (400 m)
- Surface area: 175 acres (0.7 km^{2})
- Max. depth: 35 ft (11 m)
- Surface elevation: 1,112 ft (339 m)
- Settlements: Harrison

Budd Lake is a 175-acre (0.7 km^{2}) lake in Clare County, in the central region of Michigan's lower peninsula.

Wilson State Park, a 36-acre wooded area with 160 campsites, borders the lake to the northwest with a sandy beach. In the early 1900s century, several lumber mills operated on the Budd Lake shoreline, and a lumber company that operated in the late 1800s donated Wilson State Park to Michigan.

The lake is popular among anglers, particularly for its muskies, some longer than 40 inches, along with bass, panfish, perch and walleye. Dropoffs near the shore provide deep water refuge; the lake is up to 30 feet deep, with the south end being shallower.

There is a single public boat ramp at the southern end of the lake.

== VHS Fish Disease ==
The Michigan DNR announced on May 17, 2007, that Budd became the first inland lake in the state of Michigan confirmed to be infected by viral hemorrhagic septicemia (VHS). The DNR analyzed fish specimens after a very large die-off that began on April 30, 2007, of muskies, bluegills, and black crappie. VHS is an infectious virus-spread fish disease responsible for mass die-offs of many species, but not linked to any human health concerns. The disease can be spread between bodies of water through live or frozen bait fish, roe, contaminated fishing equipment, live water wells in boats, and ballast water, among other ways. Boats and fishing equipment should be disinfected before transfer from Budd Lake to other destinations.

The DNR announced that tests confirmed the continued presence of the virus in 2011, following a die-off of large mouth and small mouth bass, bluegills, and pumpkinseed sunfish in April to May 2011. Fish specimens collected in May were among those used in testing the effectiveness of StaRT-PCR testing compared to cell culture and conventional qRT-PCR DNA testing, which avoided false negatives that occurred with the other techniques.

== See also ==
- List of lakes in Michigan
