= Long Lake (Grant County, Minnesota) =

Lake in the state of Minnesota, United States

- Location in Minnesota
- Location: Grant County, Minnesota, United States
- Coordinates: 45°56′59″N 95°55′21″W
- Surface elevation: 1,204 feet (367 m)

Long Lake is a lake in Grant County, in the U.S. state of Minnesota.

Long Lake was named from the fact it is much longer than it is wide.

== See also ==
- List of lakes in Minnesota
