= Long Lake (Michigan) =

Lake in the state of Michigan, United States

Long Lake is the name of several lakes in the U.S. state of Michigan:

Name	County*	State	Coord	Elevation	GNIS ID	Notes
Baldy Lake	Alger County	MI	46°13′02″N 086°39′07″W	794 feet (242 m)	1619078	formerly known as Long Lake & Bass Lake
Lake Stella	Alger County	MI	46°10′52″N 086°46′33″W	791 feet (241 m)	1621769	formerly known as Long Lake
Long Lake	Alger County	MI	46°30′20″N 086°19′08″W	906 feet (276 m)	630969	
Wetmore Lake	Alger County	MI	46°22′04″N 086°35′29″W	840 feet (260 m)	1622122	formerly known as Long Lake
Long Lake	Alpena County	MI	45°12′17″N 083°28′40″W	650 feet (200 m)	630968	
Long Lake	Antrim County	MI	45°03′06″N 084°51′41″W	1,201 feet (366 m)	630946	
Long Lake	Baraga County	MI	46°36′42″N 088°14′05″W	1,745 feet (532 m)	630960	
Little Long Lake	Barry County	MI	42°25′21″N 085°26′37″W	889 feet (271 m)	630681	in Prairieville Twp/ Richland Twp
Long Lake	Barry County	MI	42°28′28″N 085°14′37″W	912 feet (278 m)	630924	
Long Lake	Barry County	MI	42°33′10″N 085°22′43″W	909 feet (277 m)	630972	
Long Lake	Barry County	MI	42°35′44″N 085°11′42″W	837 feet (255 m)	630925	
Long Lake	Barry County	MI	42°37′14″N 085°30′08″W	745 feet (227 m)	630973	
Long Lake	Benzie County	MI	44°41′43″N 086°10′07″W	597 feet (182 m)	630943	
Long Lake	Berrien County	MI	41°55′00″N 086°18′14″W	722 feet (220 m)	630965	
East Long Lake	Branch County	MI	41°51′01″N 084°58′04″W	984 feet (300 m)	630917	
Little Long Lake	Branch County	MI	41°56′44″N 085°03′05″W	928 feet (283 m)	1617050	
Long Noble Lake	Branch County	MI	41°47′17″N 085°16′56″W	889 feet (271 m)	630988	
West Long Lake	Branch County	MI	41°57′00″N 085°02′55″W	925 feet (282 m)	630919	
Gardner Lake	Calhoun County	MI	42°19′05″N 085°03′25″W	896 feet (273 m)	626649	
Long Lake	Calhoun County	MI	42°11′38″N 084°58′27″W	935 feet (285 m)	630920	
Long Lake	Cass County	MI	41°46′50″N 085°49′09″W	755 feet (230 m)	630915	
Long Lake	Cass County	MI	41°48′33″N 086°04′48″W	817 feet (249 m)	630916	
Long Lake	Cass County	MI	41°51′00″N 085°54′05″W	833 feet (254 m)	630918	
Lake Charlevoix	Charlevoix County	MI	45°14′53″N 085°04′33″W	581 feet (177 m)	1618895	
Long Lake	Cheboygan County	MI	45°31′57″N 084°23′56″W	663 feet (202 m)	630949	
Little Long Lake	Clare County	MI	44°01′35″N 084°47′10″W	1,102 feet (336 m)	630684	
Long Lake	Clare County	MI	44°05′26″N 084°45′59″W	1,132 feet (345 m)	630939	
Long Pond	Clare County	MI	43°54′55″N 085°00′18″W	1,079 feet (329 m)	630938	
Remington Lake	Delta County	MI	46°01′32″N 086°37′01″W	751 feet (229 m)	1621371	
Long Lake	Dickinson County	MI	46°11′27″N 088°03′57″W	1,388 feet (423 m)	630952	
Lake Fenton	Genesee County	MI	42°50′21″N 083°43′00″W	873 feet (266 m)	625897	formerly named Long Lake
Little Long Lake	Genesee County	MI	42°51′08″N 083°42′41″W	869 feet (265 m)	630682	East of Lake Fenton
Long Lake	Genesee County	MI	43°00′28″N 083°31′12″W	791 feet (241 m)	630931	
Lake Lochbrae	Gladwin County	MI	44°06′08″N 084°29′37″W	883 feet (269 m)	630849	
Kinwamakwad Lake	Gogebic County	MI	46°14′09″N 089°29′57″W	1,686 feet (514 m)	1620438	
Long Lake	Gogebic County	MI	46°14′28″N 089°22′10″W	1,755 feet (535 m)	1620612	
Long Lake	Grand Traverse County	MI	44°43′05″N 085°44′59″W	846 feet (258 m)	630966	
Long Lake	Hillsdale County	MI	41°52′10″N 084°47′46″W	1,017 feet (310 m)	630970	
Long Lake	Ionia County	MI	43°06′48″N 085°07′19″W	801 feet (244 m)	630974	
Little Long Lake	Iosco County	MI	44°24′23″N 083°51′17″W	896 feet (273 m)	630685	
Long Lake	Iosco County	MI	44°25′08″N 083°51′17″W	899 feet (274 m)	1620610	
Long Lake	Iron County	MI	46°07′11″N 088°27′07″W	1,417 feet (432 m)	630951	
Long Lake	Iron County	MI	46°24′11″N 088°19′29″W	1,627 feet (496 m)	630954	
Smoky Lake	Iron County	MI	46°05′45″N 088°56′31″W	1,699 feet (518 m)	1580439	
Long Lake	Isabella County	MI	43°42′01″N 085°04′58″W	919 feet (280 m)	630936	
Long Lake	Jackson County	MI	42°23′06″N 084°23′03″W	915 feet (279 m)	630923	
Campbell Lake	Kalamazoo County	MI	42°19′24″N 085°28′00″W	830 feet (250 m)	622660	
Long Lake	Kalamazoo County	MI	42°11′40″N 085°31′20″W	853 feet (260 m)	630921	
Long Lake	Kalkaska County	MI	44°34′20″N 085°17′56″W	1,076 feet (328 m)	630942	
Long Lake	Kent County	MI	43°12′43″N 085°39′43″W	774 feet (236 m)	630935	
Long Lake	Keweenaw County	MI	47°26′46″N 088°11′00″W	643 feet (196 m)	630961	
Seaman Lake	Lake County	MI	44°03′44″N 085°59′05″W	751 feet (229 m)	1621553	
Long Lake	Lapeer County	MI	43°00′30″N 083°22′53″W	837 feet (255 m)	630932	
Long Lake	Lapeer County	MI	43°00′53″N 083°09′00″W	837 feet (255 m)	630933	
Long Lake	Lapeer County	MI	43°06′14″N 083°13′34″W	846 feet (258 m)	630934	
Caroga Lake	Livingston County	MI	42°29′39″N 083°51′08″W	889 feet (271 m)	622749	
Long Lake	Livingston County	MI	42°37′08″N 083°44′15″W	951 feet (290 m)	630963	
Loon Lake	Livingston County	MI	42°26′11″N 083°51′44″W	850 feet (260 m)	631040	
Long Lake	Luce County	MI	46°27′26″N 085°49′00″W	846 feet (258 m)	630956	
Long Lake	Luce County	MI	46°35′43″N 085°40′03″W	758 feet (231 m)	630959	
Long Lake	Mackinac County	MI	46°06′54″N 085°47′59″W	718 feet (219 m)	630950	
Dorner Lake	Manistee County	MI	44°12′13″N 085°56′08″W	781 feet (238 m)	1619741	
Anderson Lake	Marquette County	MI	46°13′18″N 087°29′35″W	1,102 feet (336 m)	620103	
Long Lake	Marquette County	MI	46°20′02″N 087°54′20″W	1,483 feet (452 m)	630953	
Long Lake	Marquette County	MI	46°25′11″N 087°41′54″W	1,345 feet (410 m)	630955	
Long Lake	Marquette County	MI	46°32′38″N 087°32′04″W	1,398 feet (426 m)	630962	
Long Lake	Marquette County	MI	46°33′41″N 087°59′34″W	1,650 feet (500 m)	630958	
Clancy Lake	Mason County	MI	43°52′35″N 086°13′37″W	699 feet (213 m)	1619511	
Long Lake	Mason County	MI	43°57′22″N 086°05′31″W	696 feet (212 m)	1620609	
Tainer Lake	Mason County	MI	44°10′25″N 086°17′48″W	656 feet (200 m)	1621858	
Lake Mecosta	Mecosta County	MI	43°36′04″N 085°17′43″W	958 feet (292 m)	632067	
Long Lake	Mecosta County	MI	43°46′50″N 085°18′00″W	1,109 feet (338 m)	630937	
Long Lake	Menominee County	MI	45°25′11″N 087°50′06″W	682 feet (208 m)	630948	
Long Lake	Missaukee County	MI	44°21′15″N 085°15′27″W	1,243 feet (379 m)	630941	
Gould Lake	Montcalm County	MI	43°17′47″N 085°29′58″W	886 feet (270 m)	627021	
Long Lake	Montmorency County	MI	45°07′40″N 083°58′23″W	810 feet (250 m)	630967	
Long Lake Pond	Montmorency County	MI	45°08′11″N 083°58′26″W	817 feet (249 m)	2100146	
Bitely Lake	Newaygo County	MI	43°44′37″N 085°51′42″W	853 feet (260 m)	1619223	
Ryerson Lake	Newaygo County	MI	43°28′52″N 085°51′23″W	814 feet (248 m)	1621461	
Brendel Lake	Oakland County	MI	42°38′27″N 083°30′30″W	928 feet (283 m)	621920	Variant Name: Long Lake; west of Oxbow
Long Lake	Oakland County	MI	42°36′37″N 083°27′24″W	932 feet (284 m)	630926	West of Union Lake
Long Lake	Oakland County	MI	42°45′39″N 083°33′37″W	928 feet (283 m)	630927	Northwest of Davisburg
Long Lake	Oakland County	MI	42°47′31″N 083°14′02″W	965 feet (294 m)	630928	near Lake Orion
Long Lake	Oakland County	MI	42°48′41″N 083°26′03″W	961 feet (293 m)	630929	South of Brandon Gardens
Long Lake	Oakland County	MI	42°48′52″N 083°17′28″W	1,017 feet (310 m)	630930	Oxford Township
Lower Long Lake	Oakland County	MI	42°35′18″N 083°17′42″W	912 feet (278 m)	631177	Bloomfield Township
Upper Long Lake	Oakland County	MI	42°35′43″N 083°19′11″W	912 feet (278 m)	1615408	Bloomfield Township
Long Lake	Oceana County	MI	43°32′27″N 086°29′15″W	607 feet (185 m)	1620608	
Arrowhead Lake	Ogemaw County	MI	44°20′04″N 083°58′32″W	876 feet (267 m)	620248	
Long Lake	Ogemaw County	MI	44°14′25″N 084°00′24″W	833 feet (254 m)	630940	
Long Lost Lake	Ogemaw County	MI	44°30′13″N 084°05′33″W	1,234 feet (376 m)	1620615	
Big Long Lake	Osceola County	MI	44°00′15″N 085°17′52″W	1,296 feet (395 m)	630975	
Little Long Lake	Osceola County	MI	44°01′22″N 085°18′34″W	1,270 feet (390 m)	630683	
McCoy Lake	Osceola County	MI	44°00′54″N 085°25′20″W	1,237 feet (377 m)	631853	
Long Lake	Otsego County	MI	44°55′23″N 084°24′01″W	1,237 feet (377 m)	630944	
Long Lake	Otsego County	MI	44°57′11″N 084°37′50″W	1,253 feet (382 m)	630945	
Long Lake	Presque Isle County	MI	45°13′56″N 084°12′12″W	797 feet (243 m)	630947	
Banana Lake	Schoolcraft County	MI	46°04′07″N 086°29′12″W	692 feet (211 m)	1619082	
Kepler Lake	Schoolcraft County	MI	46°07′05″N 086°18′13″W	702 feet (214 m)	1620417	
Long Lake	Schoolcraft County	MI	46°30′09″N 086°05′19″W	863 feet (263 m)	630957	
Stewart Lake	Schoolcraft County	MI	46°11′39″N 085°53′56″W	682 feet (208 m)	638837	
Long Lake	St. Joseph County	MI	41°54′57″N 085°20′29″W	850 feet (260 m)	1624692	
Long Lake	St. Joseph County	MI	41°57′25″N 085°45′06″W	889 feet (271 m)	1624693	
Long Lake	Steuben County	IN	41°44′50″N 084°48′24″W	1,037 feet (316 m)	438270	
Long Lake	Van Buren County	MI	42°22′34″N 085°47′39″W	768 feet (234 m)	630971	
Long Lake	Washtenaw County	MI	42°21′03″N 084°03′45″W	945 feet (288 m)	630922	
Long Lake	Wexford County	MI	44°19′33″N 085°22′20″W	1,253 feet (382 m)	1620613	

*Note on lakes that span more than one county: The county column only shows the first county returned by GNIS in this column.

== See also ==
- Long Lake, Michigan, a community in Plainfield Township, Iosco County
- Long Lake Township, Michigan, in Grand Traverse County
- Long Lake (disambiguation)
