= Long Lake (East Ferris, Ontario) =

Lake in Nipissing District, Ontario, Canada

- Location within Ontario
- Location: Northeastern Ontario
- Coordinates: 46°18′14″N 79°14′45″W
- Primary outflows: Mattawa River
- Basin countries: Canada
- Surface elevation: ~215 m (705 ft)

Long Lake is a small lake in northeastern Ontario, Canada. It is located in the municipality of East Ferris in Nipissing District.

The lake is about 1.4 km in length and is around 100m in width. It is fed by a number of unnamed creeks and is drained by a tributary of the Mattawa River.

The lake is located within the Mattawa River Provincial Park.

The nearest community is Camp Champlain, 4 km NWW of the lake.

== See also ==
- List of lakes in Ontario
