= Long Lake (Athabasca County) =

Lake in Alberta, Canada

- Location within Alberta
- Location: Athabasca County, Alberta
- Coordinates: 54°34′44″N 113°39′19″W
- Basin countries: Canada
- Max. length: 8.3 km (5.2 mi)
- Max. width: 0.8 km (0.50 mi)
- Surface area: 1.62 km^{2} (0.63 sq mi)
- Average depth: 9.4 m (31 ft)
- Max. depth: 28 m (92 ft)
- Surface elevation: 695 m (2,280 ft)
- References: Long Lake

Long Lake is a lake in Alberta.
