= Long Lake (Thorhild County) =

Lake in Thorhild County, Alberta, Canada

- Location within Alberta
- Location: Thorhild County, Alberta, Canada
- Coordinates: 54.433°N 112.755°W
- Basin countries: Canada
- Max. length: 11.4 km (7.1 mi)
- Max. width: 1 km (0.62 mi)
- Surface area: 5.84 km^{2} (2.25 sq mi)
- Average depth: 4.3 m (14 ft)
- Max. depth: 9 m (30 ft)
- Surface elevation: 682 m (2,238 ft)

Long Lake is a lake in Thorhild County, in the Canadian province of Alberta, near Boyle, Alberta. The name of the lake, derived from the shape of the lake, has been in use in the local area for many decades. The lake follows a glacial meltwater channel through a steep-sided, forested valley. It drains into the Amisk River, which is in the Beaver River watershed, that flows eventually to the Hudsons Bay.

Long Lake was used for recreational purposes throughout the twentieth century, with the establishment of Long Lake Provincial Park occurring in 1957.

It once held a commercial fishing operation.
