= John Farey Jr. =

British engineer (1791–1851)

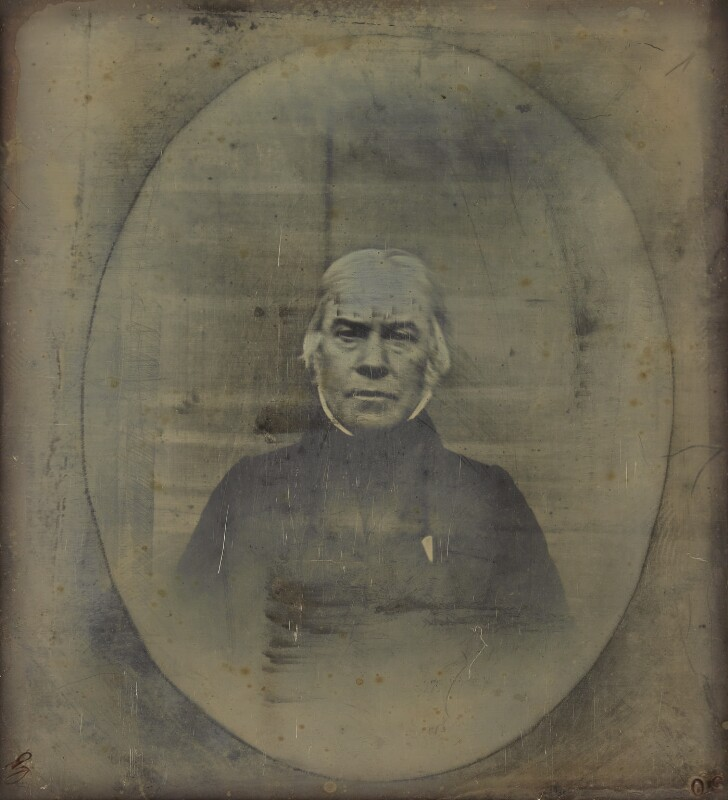
- Daguerreotype by Henry Gengembre, 1840s
- Born: 20 March 1791; Lambeth, London, England
- Died: 17 July 1851 (aged 60)
- Father: John Farey Sr.

John Farey Jr. (20 March 1791 – 17 July 1851) was an English mechanical engineer, consulting engineer and patent attorney, known for his pioneering contributions in the field of mechanical engineering.

As consulting engineer Farey worked for many well-known inventors of the later Industrial Revolution, and was a witness to a number of parliamentary enquiries, inquests and court cases, and on occasion acted as an arbitrator. He was polymathic in his interests and contributed text and drawings to a number of periodicals and encyclopaedias.

Farey is also remembered as the first English inventor of the ellipsograph, an instrument used by draughtsmen to inscribe ellipses.

== Biography ==
=== Youth and education ===
Born 20 March 1791, in Lambeth, Farey was the eldest son of John Farey Sr. (1766–1826), the geologist, and Sophia Hubert (1770–1830). He was the older brother of Joseph Farey (1796–1829), who also became a known mechanical engineer and draughtsman and member of the Institution of Civil Engineers in 1822. He remained in the shadow of his older brother and died young.

From 1791 to 1802, he lived in Woburn, Bedfordshire, where his father was stationed as a surveyor and a land agent for Francis Russell, 5th Duke of Bedford. Back in London, he possibly received training at the school of William Nicholson, established in 1799 in London's Soho Square. He did later work together with Nicholson on patent assignments. From 1804 to 1806, he studied the machinery and processes in manufacturing factories in and around London.

=== Early career ===
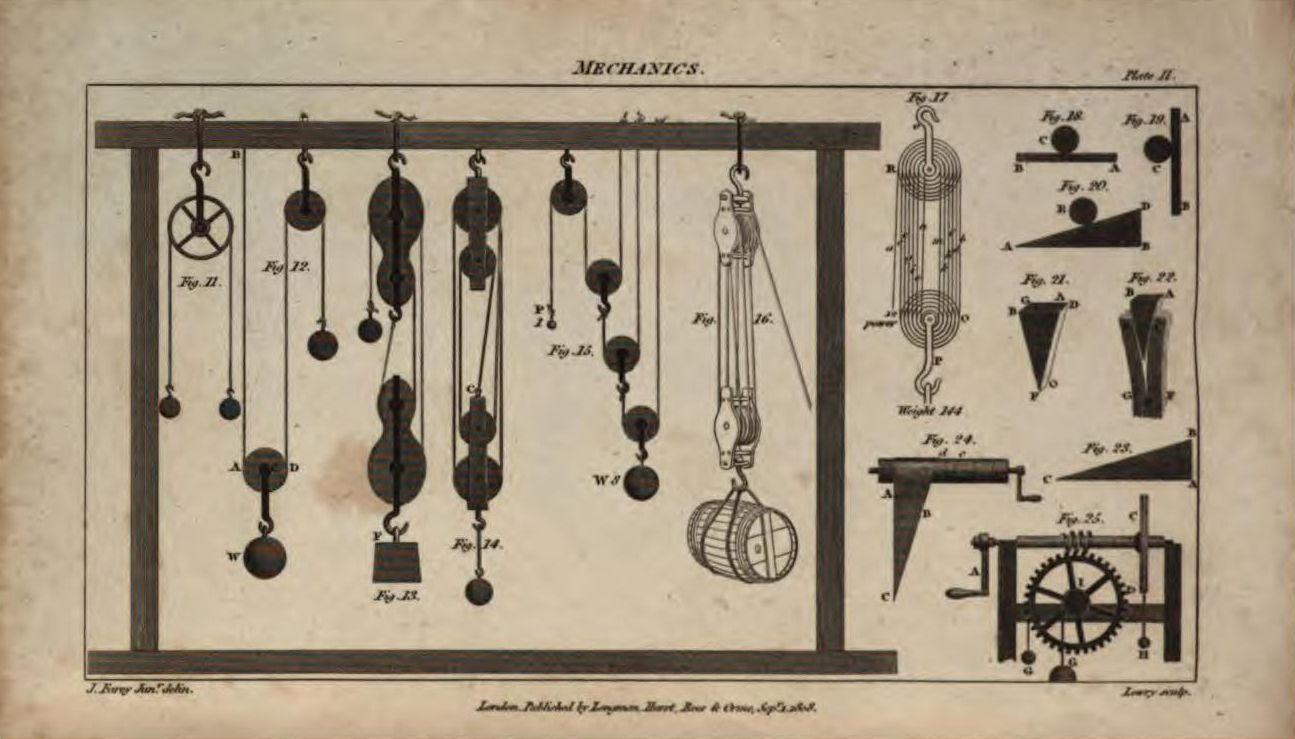
Illustration on Mechanics in the British Encyclopedia, 1809

At the age of fourteen Farey was commenced to make drawings for the illustrative plates of Rees's Cyclopædia and the 'Edinburgh' encyclopedias, 'Tilloch's Magazine,' Gregory's 'Mechanics' and 'Mechanical Dictionary,' the 'Pantalogia,' and many other scientific works. He edited some of these, and contributed to others.

For the Rees's Cyclopædia, which appeared serially between 1802 and 1820, Farey wrote several articles, including articles on Machinery, Manufactures, Mechanics, Mill, Steam Engine, Water etc.

He came into the possession of the manuscript and drawings of the engineer John Smeaton and made extensive use of them in his writing and drawing. He was involved in the production of the second volume of Smeaton's Reports (1812), the plates engraved by Wilson Lowry.

In 1819, he went to Russia for a month, where be was engaged as a civil engineer in the construction of ironworks.

=== Later career ===
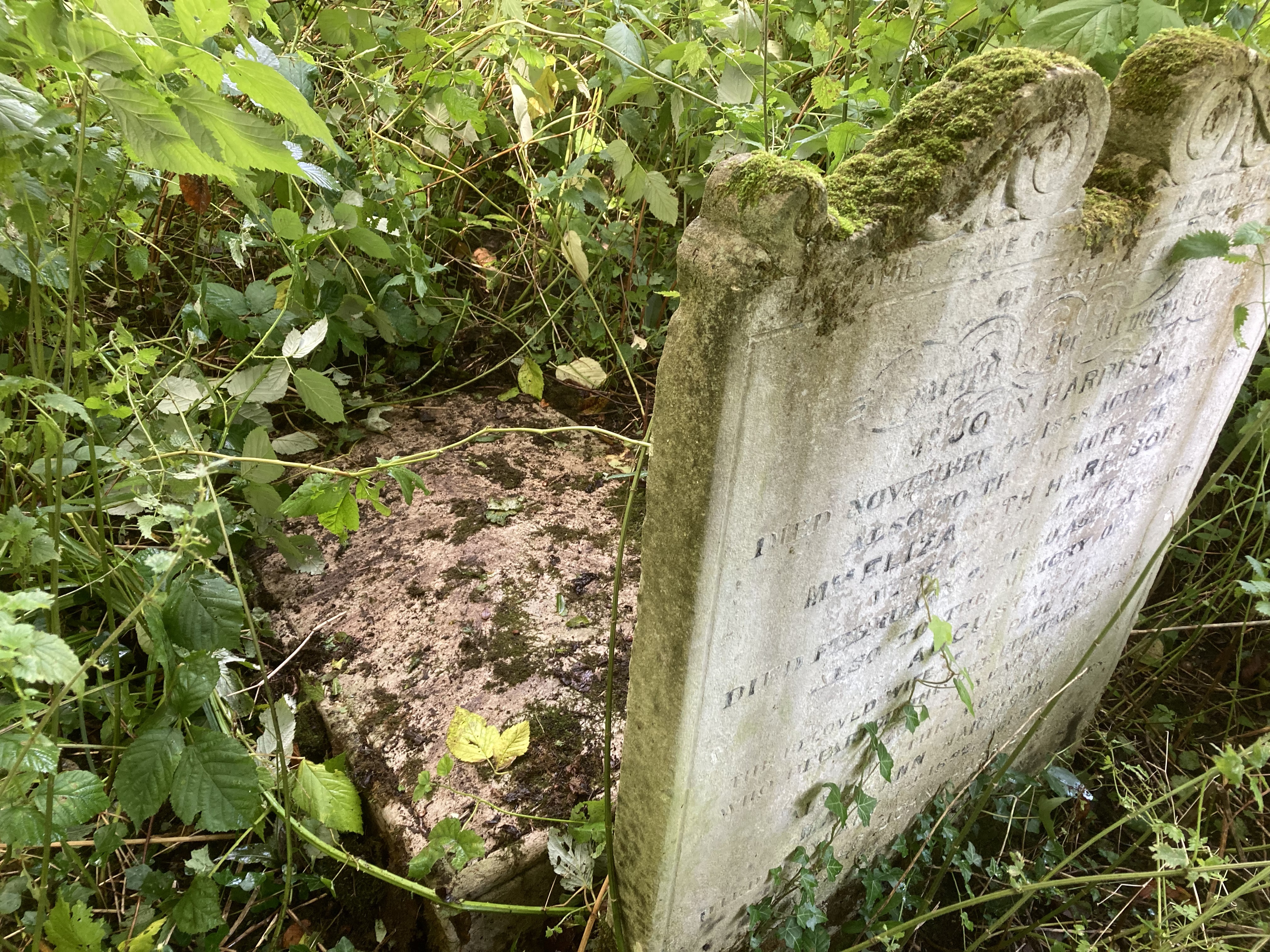
Grave of John Farey in Highgate Cemetery

In 1821, Farey stepped down in the consulting engineering family business in favour of his younger brother, Joseph Farey (1796–1829). Farey accepted an appointment at the lace manufactory of John Heathcoat in Devonshire, which, however, he gave up in 1823,

In 1825, took the engineering direction of Messrs. Marshall's flax-mills at Leeds; this position he was obliged to relinquish in 1826 in consequence of the failure of his brother's health and the necessity for his return to London, where he resumed his profession of consulting engineer, and from that time was engaged in most of the novel inventions, important trials in litigated patent cases, and scientific investigations of the period.

Farey joined the Institution of Civil Engineers as a member in 1826, served several offices in the council, and always took great interest in its welfare. His residence, 67 Great Guilford Street, Russell Square, London, was burnt down in 1850, when considerable portions of his library and documents were injured or destroyed.

His health, which had been failing since the death of his wife, now received an additional shock, and he died of disease of the heart at the Common, Sevenoaks, Kent, on 17 July 1851. and was buried on the western side of Highgate Cemetery (plot no.3864). The grave, which is behind that of John Harrison in the dissenters section, no longer has a decipherable inscription.

== Work ==
=== Instruments for drawing ===
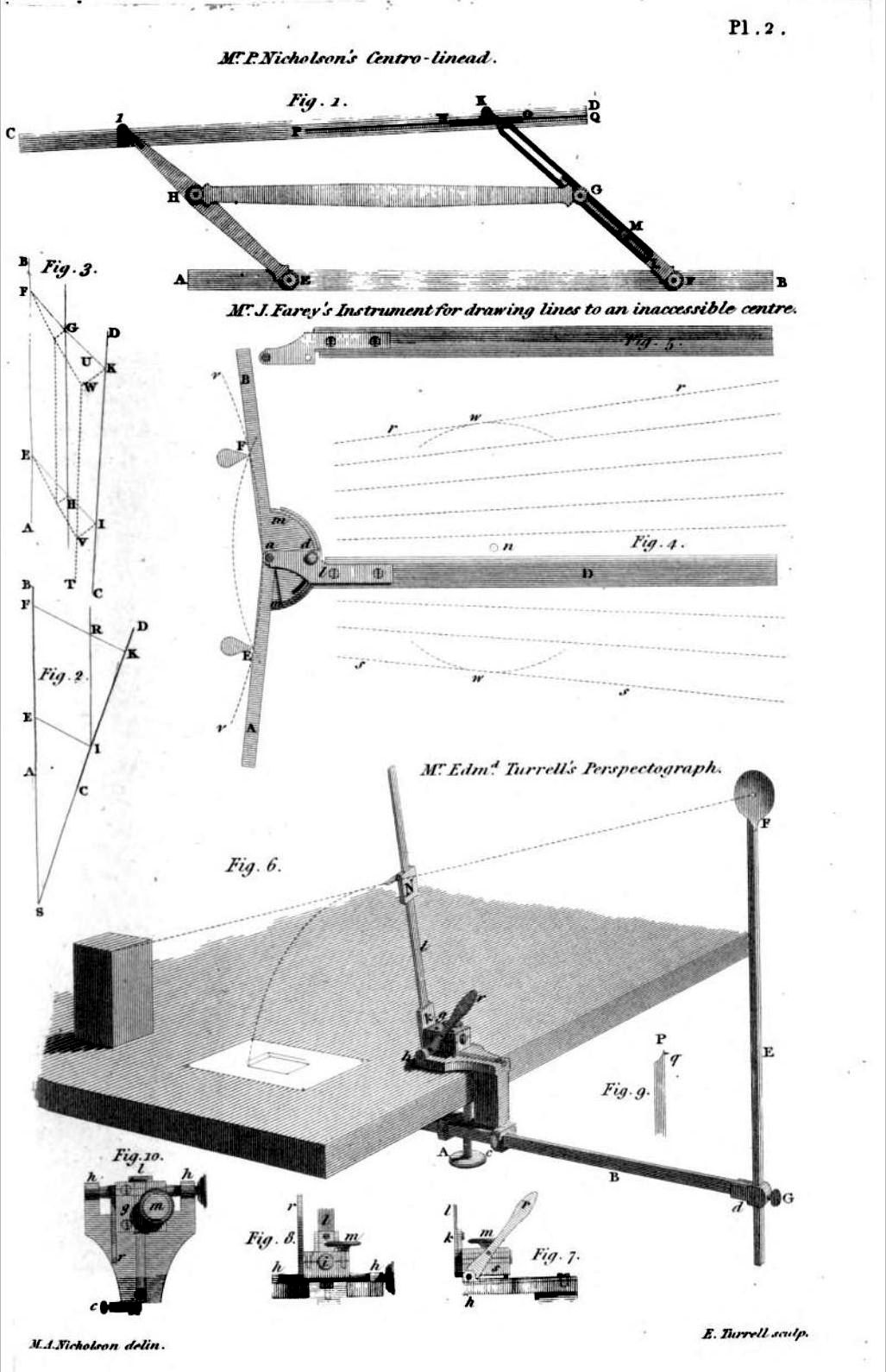
Tree instruments for making perspective drawings, 1814. Farey's invention is pictured in the middle in fig. 4 and 5.

The necessity of accomplishing drawings with accuracy in a limited time led Farey to invent in 1807 an instrument for making perspective drawings, for which he received a silver medal from the Society of Arts in 1814. In an accompanying letter printed in the Transactions, Farey explained in general:

WITH this you will receive an instrument of my invention for drawing lines converging to a distant point. This I have found extremely useful in making perspective drawings, as it gives an artist the means of making a drawing upon a. board or table of moderate dimensions though the vanishing points fall at ever so great a distance; for the instrument is quite general in its proper ties, being capable of drawing parallel lines, which may therefore be considered as converging to a point at an infinite distance, or it may in a moment be altered to draw to a point within a few inches distance. I shall be obliged to you to communicate this to the Society.
The first instrument of this kind, I made in the year 1807, and I have had it in constant use ever since, as it applies with advantage to almost every perspective drawing; l have been induced to present it to the Society, at the request of several members...

An additional four page long explanation of Farey's "Instrument for drawing Lines to an inaccessible center" in Plate 2 (see image fig. 4, 5.) started explaining:

This instrument acts upon the drawing board, or table, on which the paper is fastened, with as much facility and as little attention as a T square does, when drawing parallel lines, and will be found extremely useful to those who draw buildings, etc. in perspective, as the points to which the lines for such drawings should converge, will often fall at a distance of I2 and 15 feet from the picture, so as to render it impracticable to employ rulers of sufficient length to reach the points, and there is, except this instrument and Mr. Nicholson’s lately invented, no other practicable method of drawing such lines.
The instrument consists of three rulers, A B and D, figs 4, which are united by a common centre-screw a, and have a thumb screw d, which fixes them fast at any angle at which they may be placed...etc, etc.

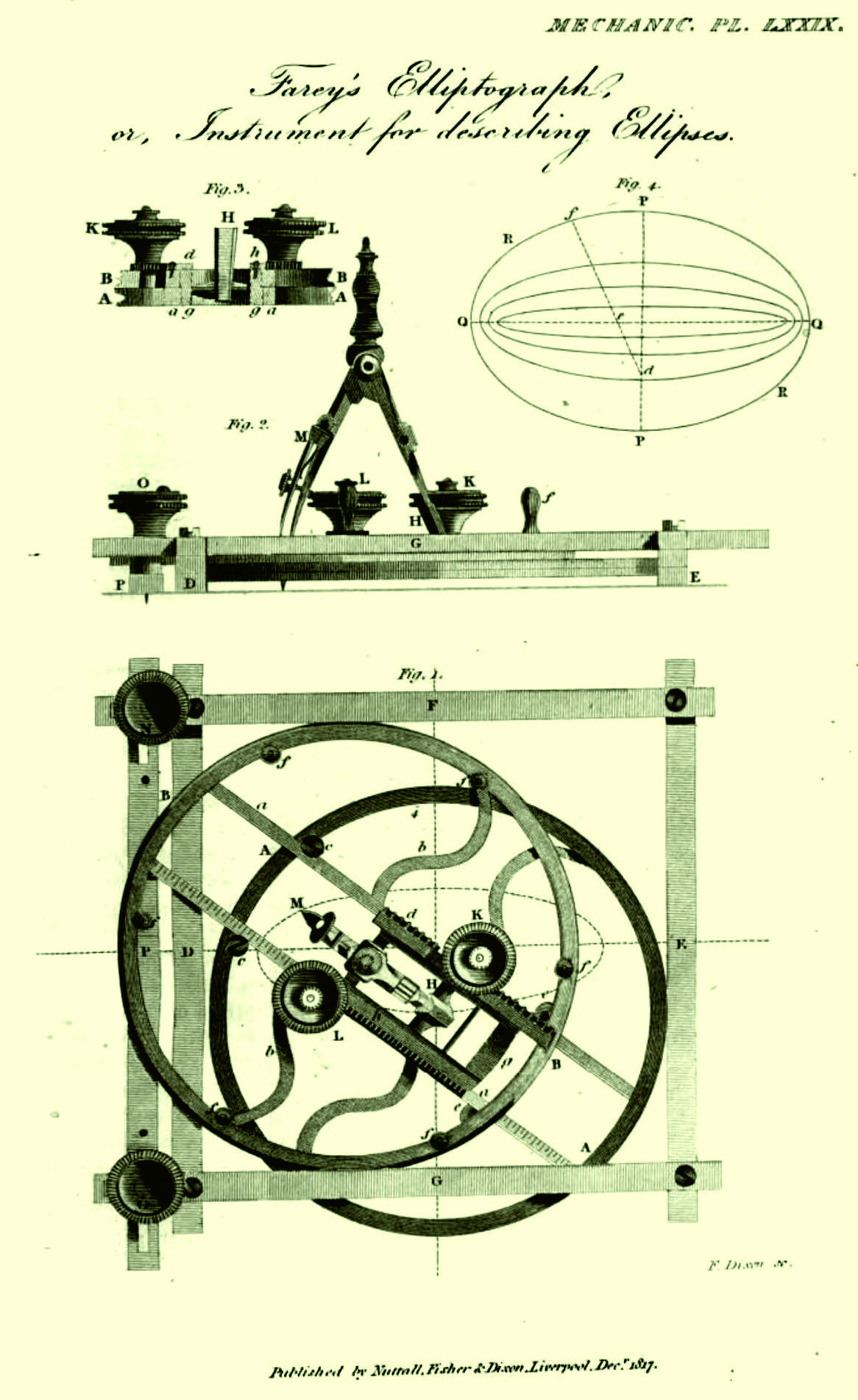
Farey's Elliptograph, 1825

In 1813, Farey also constructed a machine for drawing ellipses, the so-called ellipsograph. The device became so popular, that the 6th edition of the Encyclopædia Britannica (1824) included an article about it, which started with:

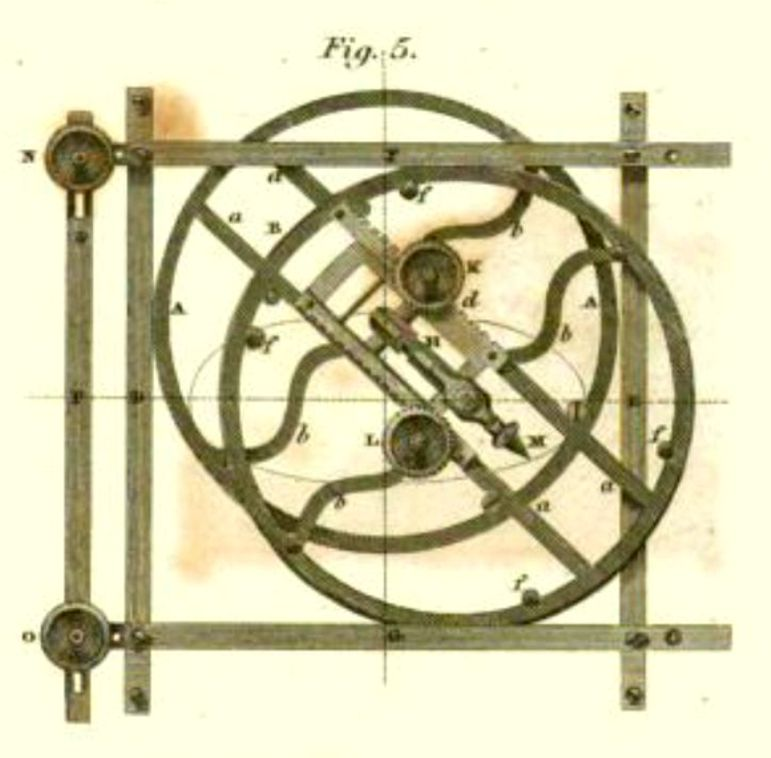
Elliptograph in Encyclopædia Britannica, 1824

ELLIPTOGRAPH, an instrument for drawing ellipses. The trammel is an instrument that has long been known and used for describing ellipses. On the principle of the trammel, Mr Farey constructed his elliptograph in a form much more commodious for drawing. Mr Farey's elliptograph is represented at fig. 5. Plate LXXIX. The circle A slides between the two parallel rulers D E. The circle 13 slides between two parallel rulers FG, at right angles to the former. In this way, if a line, joining the centres of the circles, is made to revolve, M, the extremity of that line, will describe an ellipse in the same manner, as the extremity E of the line C D E, fig. 1, does in the trammel. The elliptograph may be considered as a trammel, in which the pins C and D, rig. 1, are enlarged into the circles A and B, fig. 5...etc, etc.

The drawing device was described in many other publications in his days, for example in Smith's The Mechanic; Or, Compendium of Practical Inventions, 1825 (see image), and it was described in the Edinburgh Encyclopædia (1832) along with four other devices by Farey. For this invention the gold medal of the same society was awarded hun.

=== Steam-engine indicator and indicator-diagram ===
At the construction of ironworks in Russia since 1819 he first saw a steam-engine indicator; on his return to England he employed McNaught to make indicators for general use, and thenceforth he was continually requested to use the instrument in disputed cases of the power of steam-engines.

=== A Treatise on the Steam Engine, 1827 ===
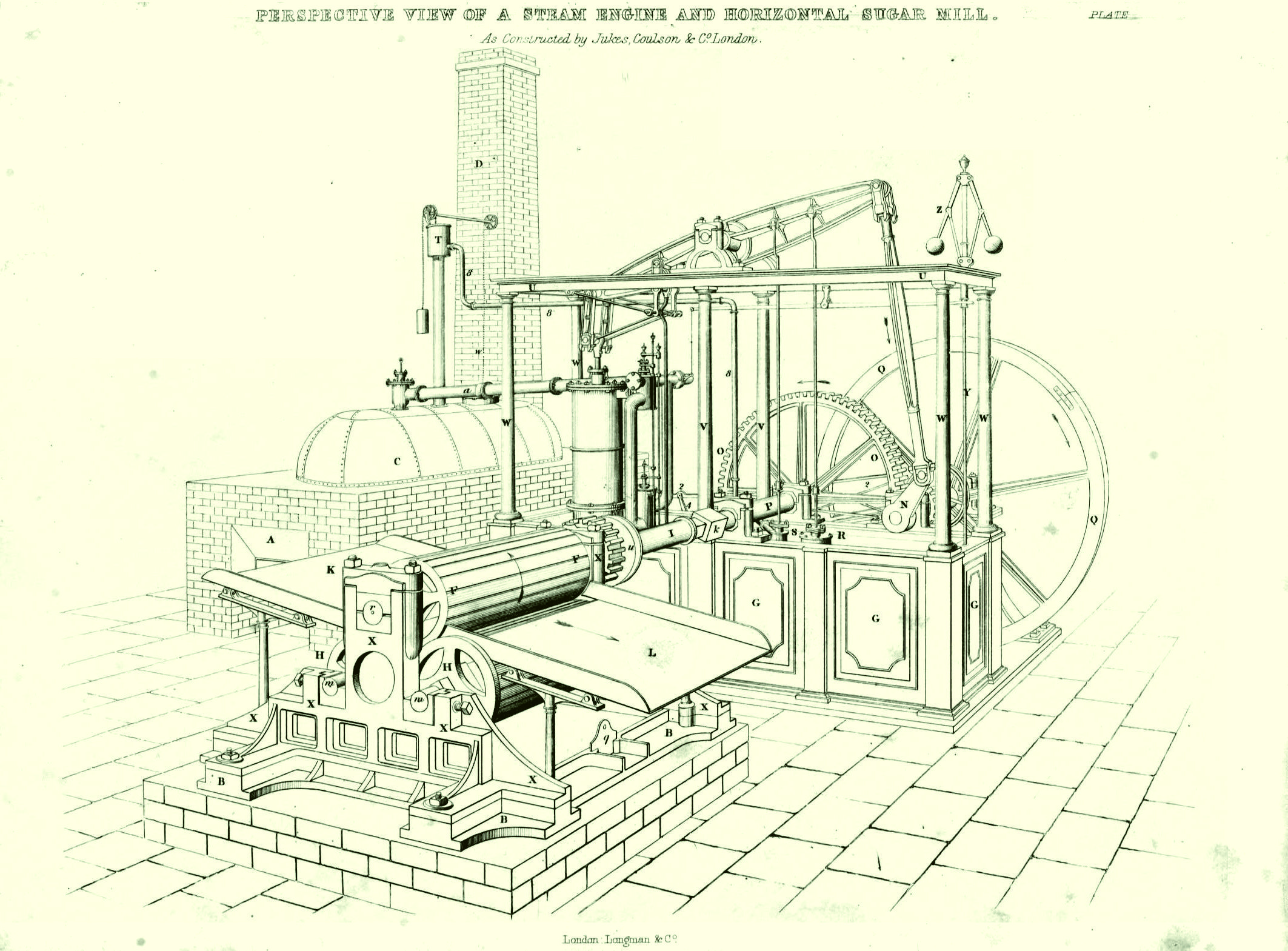
A Treatise on the Steam Engine, 1827, Plate 22

Farey wrote the two-volume work A Treatise on the Steam Engine, which has been described as the finest work on technology published in the Industrial Revolution.

The first volume covered the early developments of steam pumps, atmospheric engines and low pressure steam engines through the eighteenth century. In particular, the work of Savery, Newcomen, Smeaton and Watt. It was published in 1827. Rekers & Koetsier (2007) commented on this work:

Of Farey’s work, only the first of two volumes was published at the time, which dealt mostly with the history of steam engines up to the death of James Watt. Farey described all sorts of engines, but gave special attention to those designed by Smeaton. Besides this, the volume also included sections on the principles of mechanics and the design of engines, avoiding mathematical formulas as most engineers at the time would not have been able to understand them, according to Farey...

The second volume covered the development of high-pressure steam and the simple expansion steam engine from 1800, by Trevithick and Woolf. This volume was never published; at the time of Farey's death it had been typeset, but not sold.

The book was never sold as the sheets were pulped. It was reprinted in facsimile since from the author's proof, with hand-written corrections by the author, that is now in the National Reference Library of Science and Invention.

== Selected publications ==
- Farey, John. A treatise on the steam engine : historical, practical, and descriptive. 1827

Articles, a selection

- Farey, John. Contributions to Rees's Cyclopædia, etc., 1808–1818
- Farey, John. "Force of Steam," in: Transactions of the Institution of Civil Engineers, (1836), i. p. 85-94, p. 111-16.

Articles about

- Charles Mamby (ed.). "John Farey," obituary in: Minutes of Proceedings of the Institution of Civil Engineers, Institution of Civil Engineers (Great Britain), 1852. p. 100-102
- Alec Skempton. "Farey, Jr., John," in: A Biographical Dictionary of Civil Engineers in Great Britain and Ireland: 1500–1830. 2002. p. 223-224
- Woolrich, A. P., "John Farey and the Smeaton Manuscripts", History of Technology vol 10, 1985, pp. 181–216
- Woolrich, A. P., "John Farey, Jr., technical author and draughtsman: his contribution to Rees's Cyclopadia". Industrial Archaeology Review, 20, (1998), 49-68
- Woolrich, A. P., "John Farey and his Treatise on the Steam Engine of 1827", History of Technology, vol 22, 2000, pp. 63–106

In 1831, Farey gave evidence to a Parliamentary select committee on steam carriages, which is included in the committee's report, published in 1834.

== See also ==
- Aerial steam carriage
- John Hick - awarded a silver medal by the Society of Arts for his invention of an elliptograph in 1840.
