= Long Lake (Lanark County) =

Lake in Lanark County, Ontario, Canada

- Location within Ontario
- Location: Eastern Ontario
- Coordinates: 44°47′36″N 76°14′46″W
- Primary outflows: Adams Lake
- Basin countries: Canada
- Surface elevation: ~125 m (410 ft)
- Islands: 5

Long Lake is a lake in eastern Ontario, Canada in the municipality of Tay Valley in Lanark County.

The lake is nearly 3 km long and about 600m wide at its widest.

Long Lake is fed by a number of small tributaries leading to intermittent lakes. It is drained by an unnamed creek leading to Adams Lake. Long Lake has five islands, the largest and only named one, being Farry Island. It is located in the east end of the lake and is uninhabited. It is about 400m long and 200m wide. It is a fairly steep island, rising about 20m above the level of the lake, its highest point being over 150m above sea level.

The lake has a number of cottages lining the northern and southeastern shores. The nearest community is Stanleyville, 5 km west of the lake.

== See also ==
- List of lakes in Ontario
