= John Farey Sr. =

English geologist and writer (1766–1826)

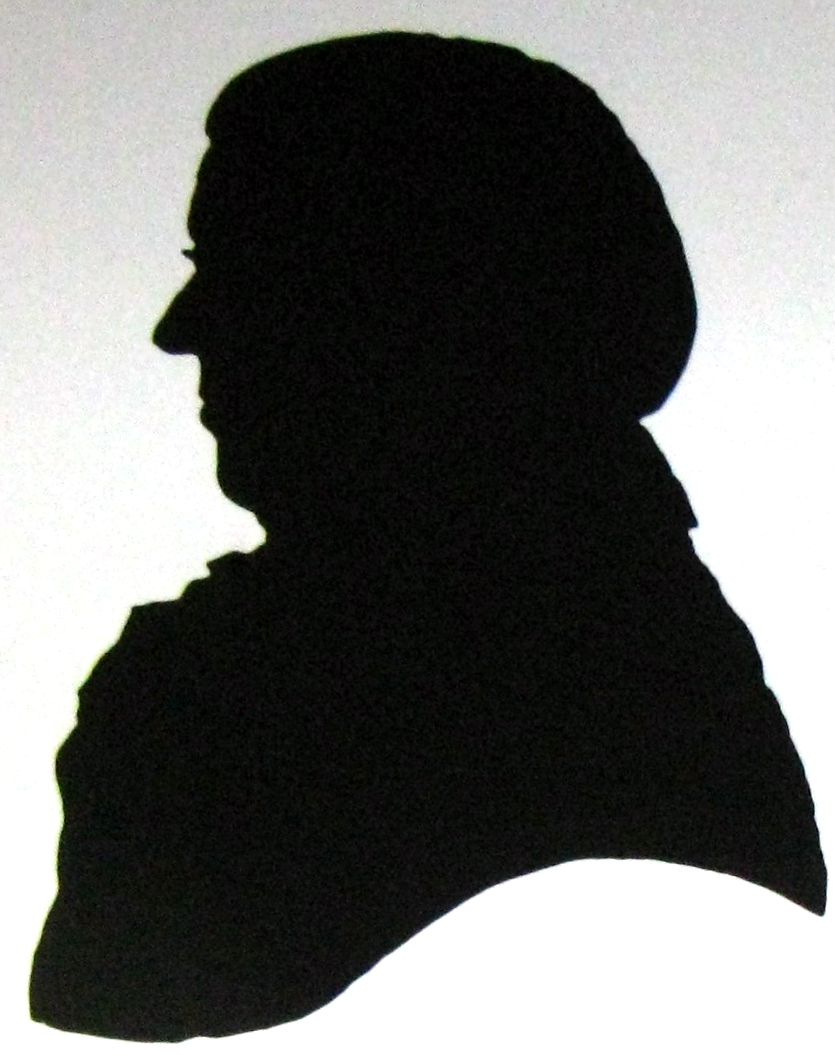

John Farey Sr. (24 September 1766 – 6 January 1826) was an English geologist and writer best known for Farey sequence, a mathematical construct that is named after him.

== Biography ==
=== Youth and early career ===
Farey was born on 24 September 1766 at Woburn in Bedfordshire to John Farey (1728–1798) and his second wife, Rachel (née Wright) (1732–1804), a Wesleyan Methodist. He was educated at Halifax in Yorkshire, and showed such aptitude in mathematics, drawing and surveying, that he was brought under the notice of John Smeaton (1724–1792).

After his education he moved to London, where he had relatives, and worked there for a number of years, during which time he met and married, Sophia Hubert (1770–1830). While in London they had their first child John Farey Jr. They went on to have eight more children, two of whom died in infancy. One of his children, Marianne Farey, was the mother of Sophie Gengembre Anderson, the noted artist.

=== Land agent in Woburn and consulting surveyor in London ===
In 1792, Farey was appointed surveyor and land agent to Francis Russell, 5th Duke of Bedford for his Woburn estates. After the death of the duke, Farey in 1802 moved to London, and, after first contemplating emigrating or taking a farm in the country, he settled there as a consulting surveyor and geologist.

That he was enabled to take this step was due largely to his acquaintance with the geologist William Smith, who in 1801 had been employed by the duke of Bedford in works of draining and irrigation. The duke, appreciating Smith's knowledge of the strata, commissioned him in 1802 to explore the margin of the chalk-hills south of Woburn in order to determine the true succession of the strata; and he instructed Farey to accompany him. Farey has remarked that Smith was his Master and Instructor in Mineral Surveying, and his subsequent publications show how well he had profited by the teachings he received.

In 1805, he succeeded the agriculturist Arthur Young as Secretary of the Smithfield Club. His surveying work took him all over the country and he was in much demand from landowners wishing to improve their estates, or exploit the minerals they held. His work on economic geology then was of importance in the burgeoning Industrial Revolution by locating new resources of coal and metal ores.

== Work ==
=== Writings ===
Farey was a prolific writer, and Professor Hugh Torrens (see references below) has traced around 270 papers by him, quadrupling the number given by the Royal Society's Catalogue of Scientific Papers. He wrote on all manner of subjects, ranging from horticulture, geology, meteorology, metrology, currency decimalisation, music and mathematics to pacifism.

He was an important contributor to Rees's Cyclopædia with articles on canals, mineralogy, surveying and a number of the scientific and mathematical basis of sound. His Canals article is the largest in the work, being some 210,000 words. He contributed similarly to the Edinburgh Encyclopedia. Various nineteenth-century biographical sources, including the Dictionary of National Biography, claimed wrongly that he wrote the Rees article on Steam. It was actually written by his son John Farey Jr.

He contributed articles on music to periodicals, as well as around 350 articles on the topic for two encyclopaedias. They concerned the mathematical relationship of note values and musical temperament. He devised a notation which allowed a sound to be expressed by the sum of three small values Σ + f + m. He made great use of the researches of Marmaduke Overend (music theorist and organist) (c1730-1790), whose manuscripts were then in the library of the Royal Institution.

In 1809, Farey met William Martin who had published work on Derbyshire fossils, to investigate whether they could create a joint geological map of Derbyshire. Martin however was too ill to meet a second time and he died the following year.

Farey's best known work is General View of the Agriculture and Minerals of Derbyshire (3 volumes 1811–17) for the Board of Agriculture. In the first of these volumes (1811) he gave an account of the upper part of the British series of strata, and an exposition of the Carboniferous and other strata of Derbyshire. In this work, and in a paper published in the Philosophical Magazine, vol. 51, 1818, p. 173, on 'Mr Smith's Geological Claims stated', he called attention to the importance of the discoveries of William Smith.

=== Farey sequence ===
As well as being remembered by historians of geology, his name is more widely known by the Farey sequence which he noted as a result of his interest in the mathematics of sound (Philosophical Magazine, vol. 47, 1816, pp. 385–386).

Farey died in London. Subsequently, Sophia, his widow, offered his geological collection to the British Museum. The museum rejected the collection, and it was dispersed and broken up.

== Selected publications ==
- John Farey, A General View of the Agriculture and Minerals of Derbyshire, 3 volumes 1811–17. Peak District Mines Historical Society, 1989. Reprint of 1811 Edition.

Articles, a selection

- John Farey, "canals", "mineralogy", "surveying" in: Rees's Cyclopædia

Publications about Farey and his work

- Woolrich, A. P. (1997). "John Farey, Jr. (1791–1851): Engineer and Polymath". History of Technology. Vol. 19. pp. 111–142. ISBN 0-7201-2365-8.
- Ford, T. D.; Torrens, H. S. (March–April 2001). "A Farey story: The pioneer geologist John Farey (1766–1826)". Geology Today. 17 (2): 59–68. Bibcode:2001GeolT..17...59F. doi:10.1046/j.1365-2451.2001.00004.x. S2CID 129250209.
- Torrens, H. S. (2004). "Farey, John (1766–1826)". The Oxford Dictionary of National Biography. Oxford Dictionary of National Biography (online ed.). Oxford University Press. doi:10.1093/ref:odnb/9154. (Subscription or UK public library membership required.)
