= Long Lake Provincial Park (Alberta) =

Provincial park in Alberta, Canada

- Location within Alberta
- Interactive map of Long Lake Provincial Park
- Location: Thorhild County, Alberta, Canada
- Nearest city: Boyle
- Coordinates: 54°26′35″N 112°46′16″W
- Area: 14.3 km^{2} (5.5 sq mi)
- Established: March 25, 1957
- Governing body: Alberta Tourism, Parks and Recreation

Long Lake Provincial Park is a provincial park located in Alberta, Canada. Long Lake is located one and one half hours from Edmonton along Highway 831, south of the village of Boyle and northeast of the hamlet of Newbrook, within Thorhild County.

The park is situated at an elevation of 625 m (2,051 ft) and has an area of 14.3 km^{2} (5.5 sq mi). It was established on March 25, 1957, and is maintained by the Alberta Parks Division of Alberta Environment and Parks.

== Recreation ==
Recreation activities available at the park include: Camping, Canoeing/Kayaking, Cross Country Skiing, Downhill Skiing, Fishing, Group Use, Hiking - Front Country, Horseshoes, Ice Fishing, Mountain Biking/Cycling, Power Boating, Sailing, Snowmobiling (Off-site), Swimming and Water Skiing

There is also the Long Lake Ski Area, a downhill and cross country ski area for recreation during the winter months with a chalet and cafe. A golf course and horse stables are also located nearby.

== Facilities and Services ==
Boat Launch Boat Launch, Change Rooms, Cook Shelters, Fast Food Concession, Firepits, Firewood Sold, Fish Cleaning Stations, Flush Toilets, Golf Course, Grocery/supply store, Hand Launch, Horseshoe Pitch, Laundry, Pay Phone, Picnic Shelter, Pier, Pit/Vault Toilets, Playground, Power, Sewage Disposal, Showers, Warmup Shelter, Water (TapWater), Wheelchair Accessible

== See also ==
- List of provincial parks in Alberta
- List of Canadian provincial parks
- List of Canadian national parks
