= National Register of Historic Places listings in Michigan =

This is a list of properties on the National Register of Historic Places in the U.S. state of Michigan.

This National Park Service list is complete through NPS recent listings posted September 25, 2026.

TABLE OF CONTENTS

Legend
Italic link – Links to a separate articles
Regular link – Redirects further down in this article
Black text – Listed county has no designated NRHP listings

Alcona • Alger • Allegan • Alpena • Antrim • Arenac • Baraga • Barry • Bay • Benzie • Berrien • Branch • Calhoun • Cass • Charlevoix • Cheboygan • Chippewa • Clare • Clinton • Crawford • Delta • Dickinson • Eaton • Emmet • Genesee • Gladwin • Gogebic • Grand Traverse • Gratiot • Hillsdale • Houghton • Huron • Ingham • Ionia • Iosco • Iron • Isabella • Jackson • Kalamazoo • Kalkaska • Kent • Keweenaw • Lake • Lapeer • Leelanau • Lenawee • Livingston • Luce • Mackinac • Macomb • Manistee • Marquette • Mason • Mecosta • Menominee • Midland • Missaukee • Monroe • Montcalm • Montmorency • Muskegon • Newaygo • Oakland • Oceana • Ogemaw • Ontonagon • Osceola • Oscoda • Otsego • Ottawa • Presque Isle • Roscommon • Saginaw • Sanilac • Schoolcraft • Shiawassee • St. Clair • St. Joseph • Tuscola • Van Buren • Washtenaw • Wayne (excluding Detroit) • Wayne (only Detroit) • Wexford

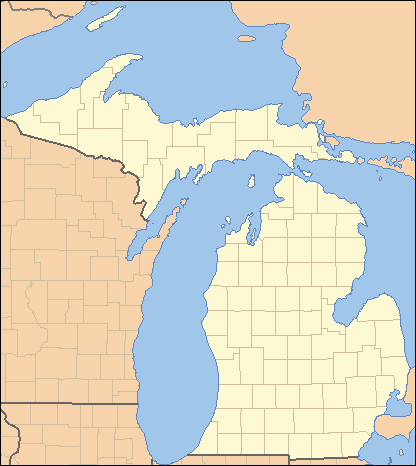

== Current listings by county ==
Density of National Register of Historic Places listing among Michigan counties

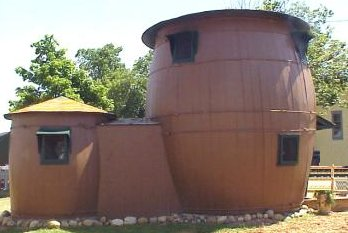
Pickle Barrel House in Burt Township, Alger County

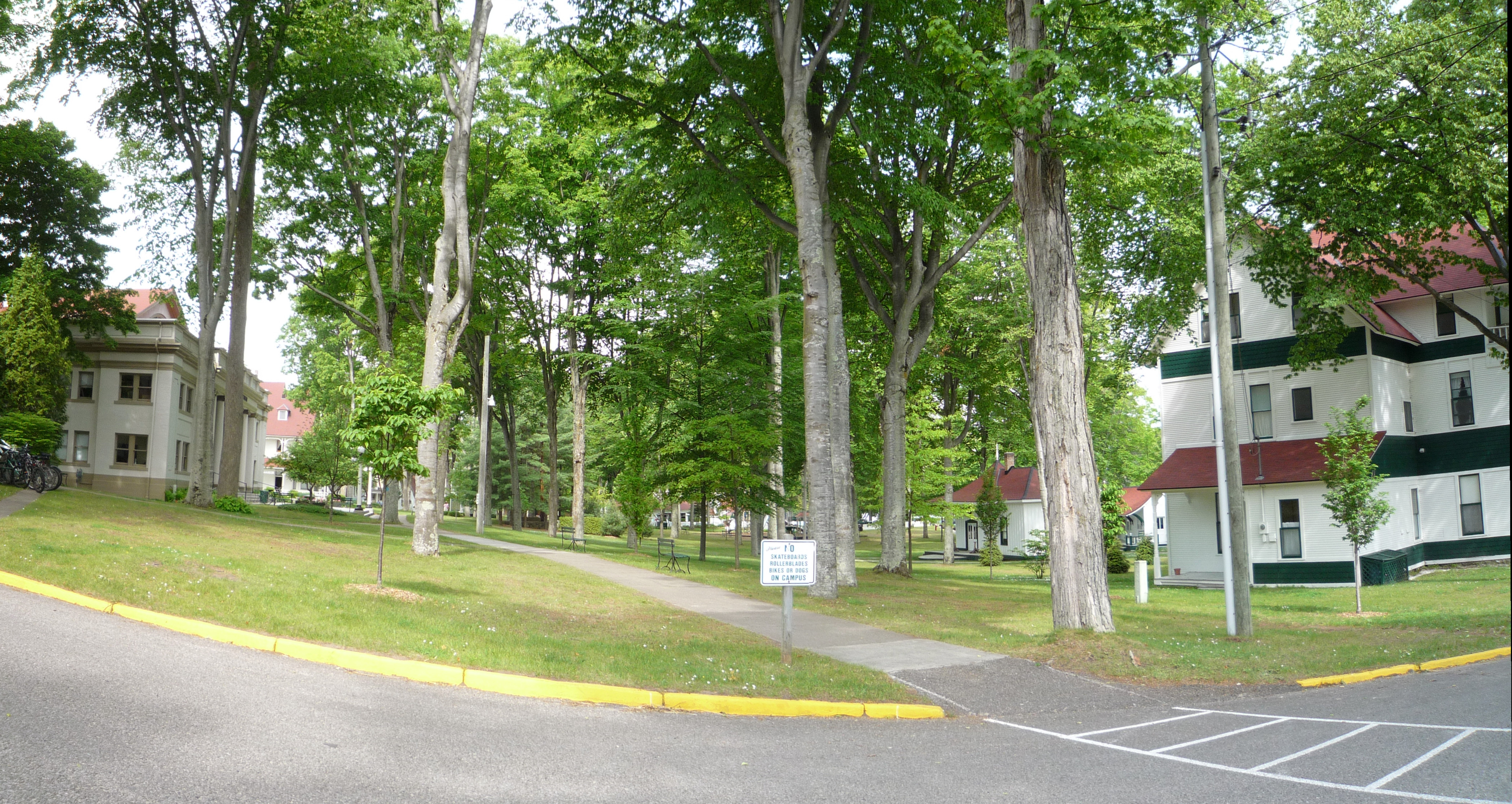
Bay View, Michigan, an entire community designated as a National Historic Landmark

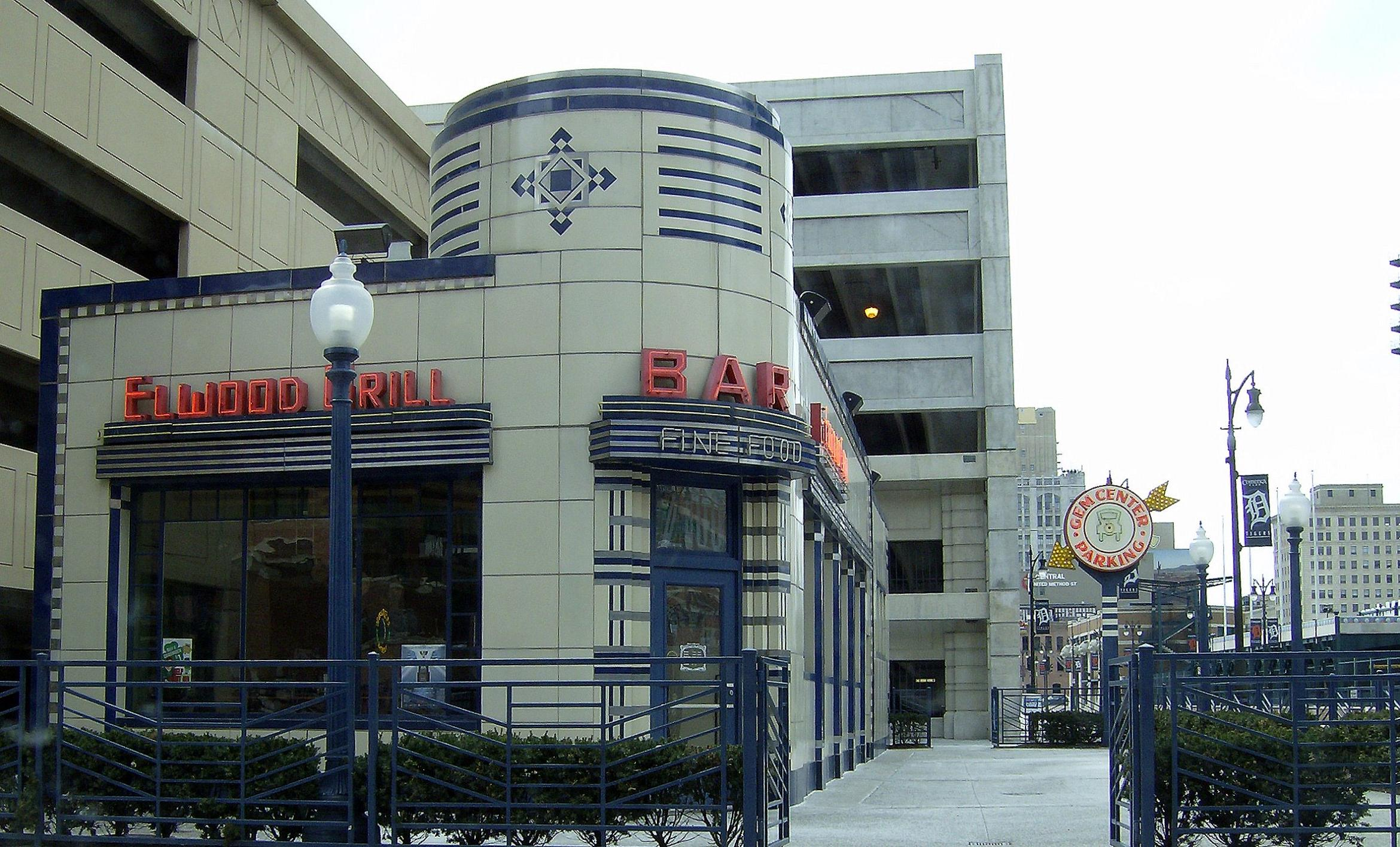
The Elwood Bar in Detroit. The city itself has 234 individual historic listings.

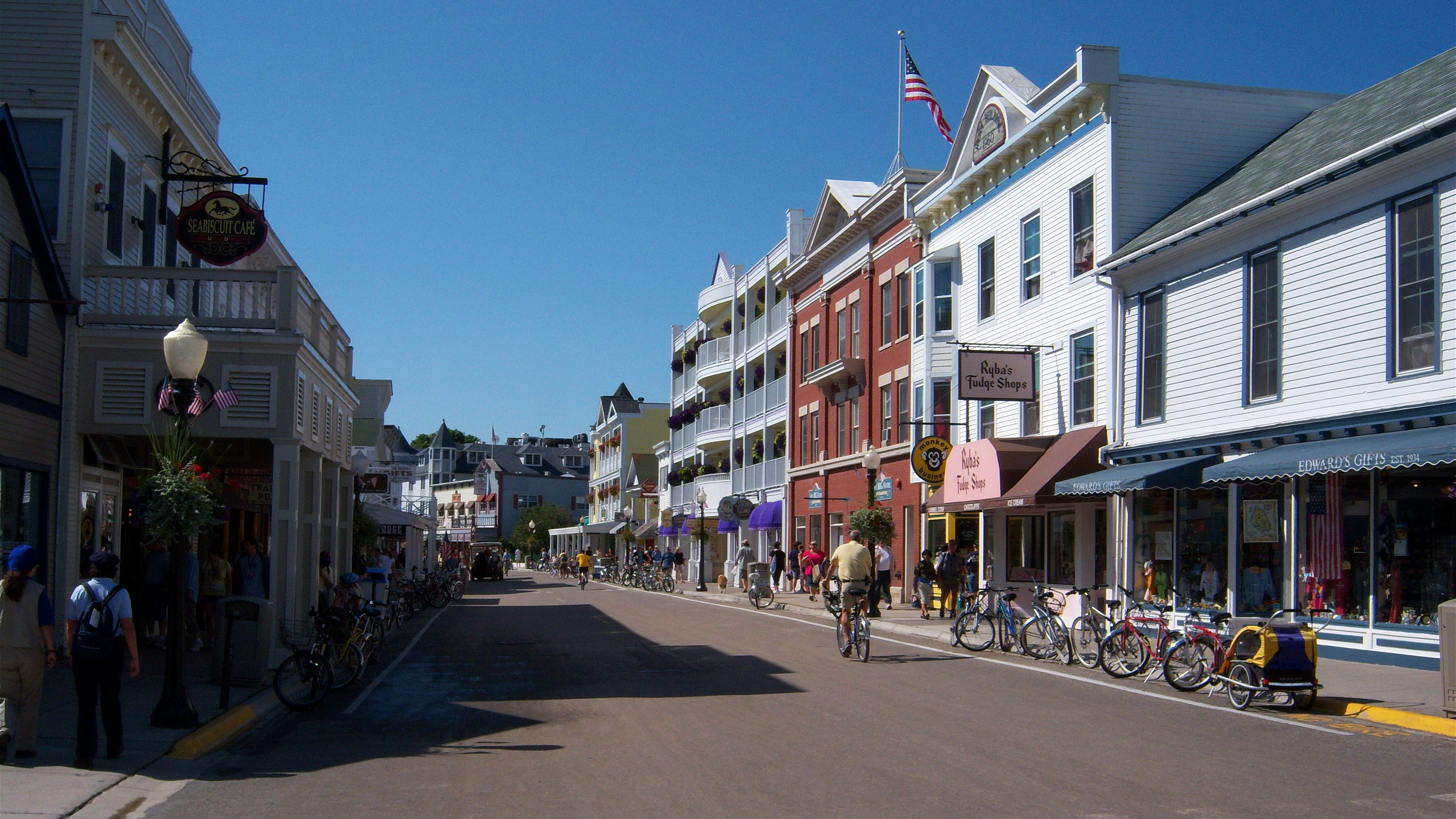
The entire island of Mackinac Island is a designated National Historic Landmark.

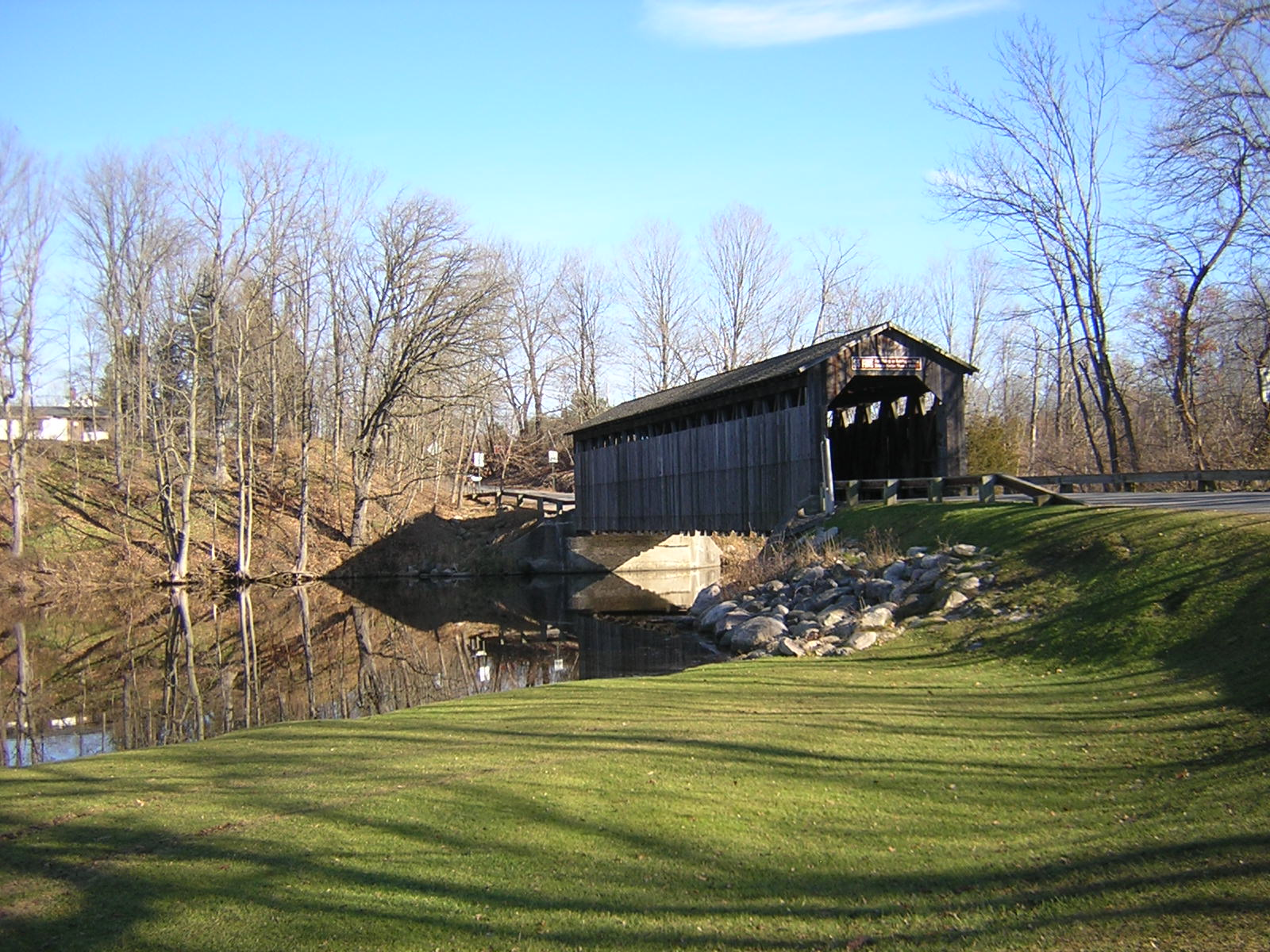
The Fallasburg Bridge in Vergennes Township, Kent County

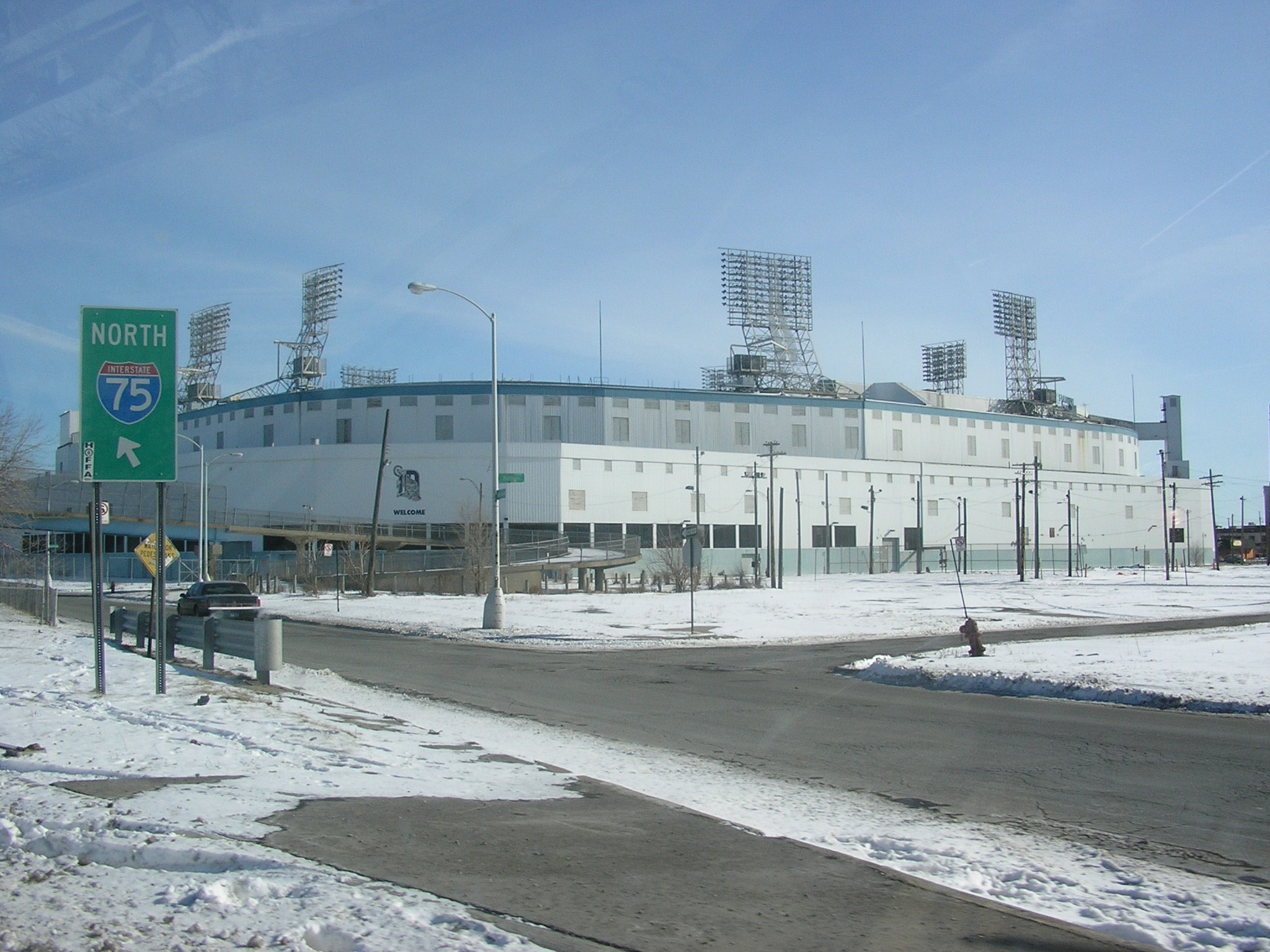
Tiger Stadium in Detroit, an example of a listing that has since been demolished

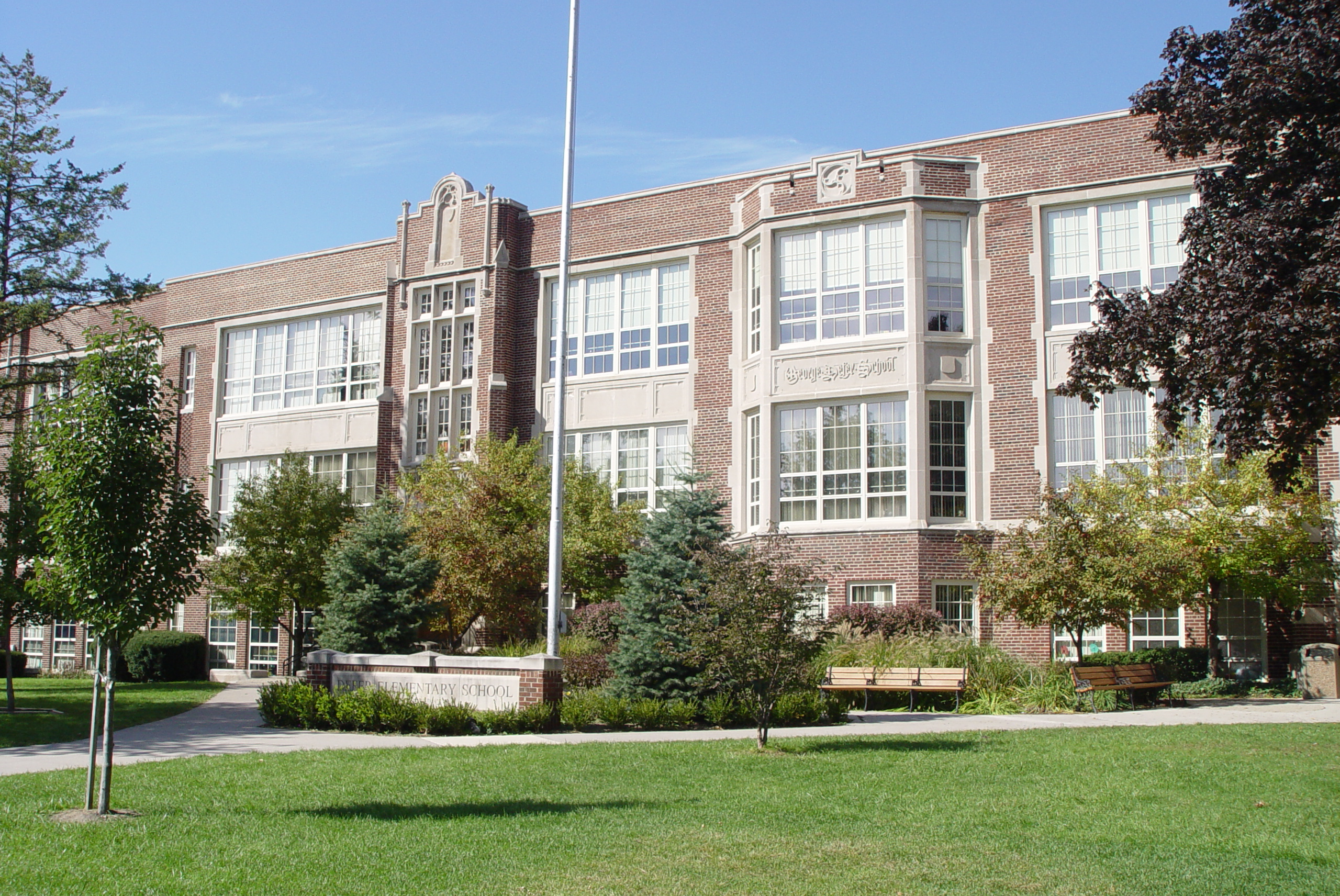
Defer Elementary School, a fully functioning school in Grosse Pointe Park

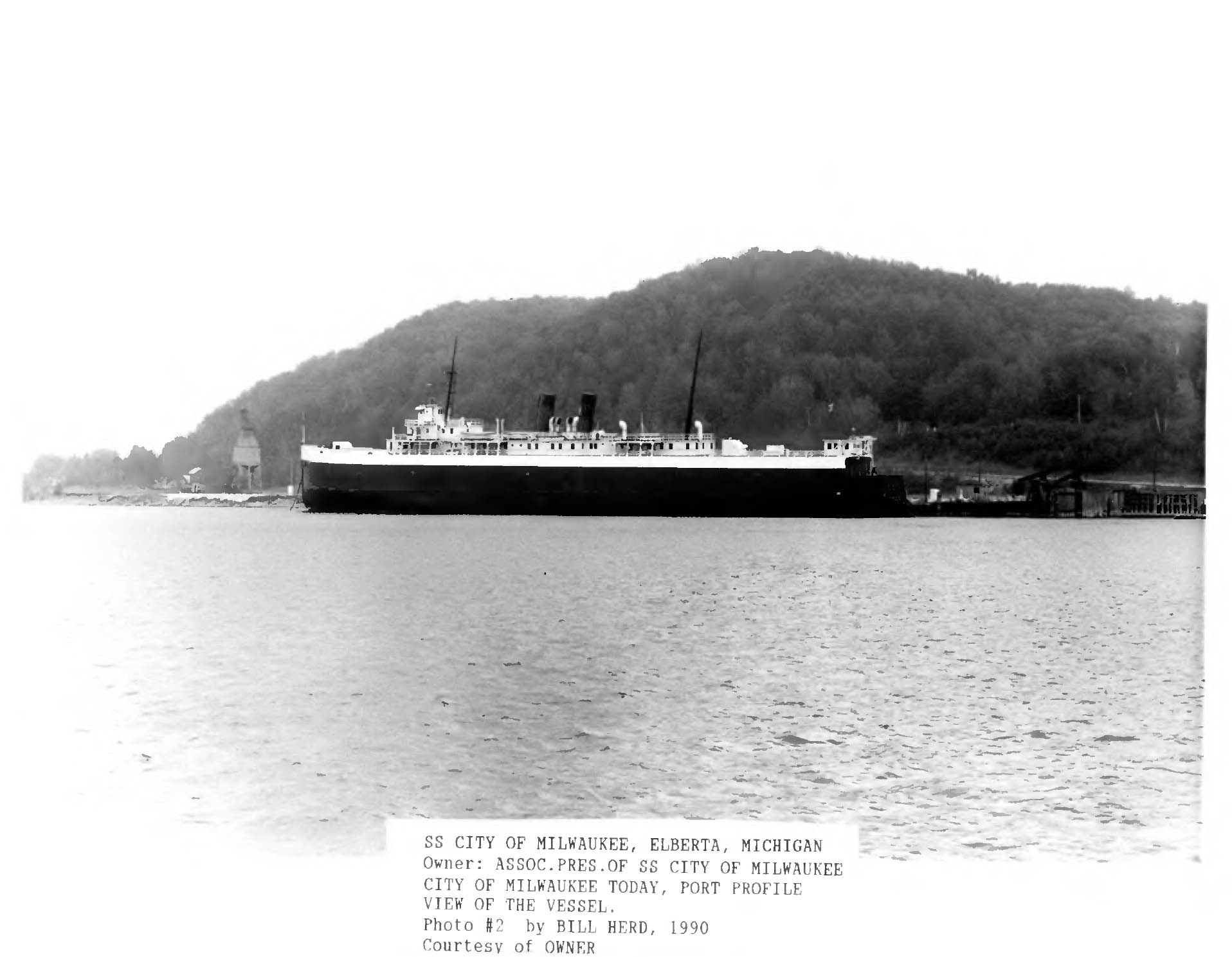
The SS City of Milwaukee, an example of a train ferry listed as a historic property

	County	# of Sites
1	Alcona	1
2	Alger	16
3	Allegan	35
4	Alpena	11
5	Antrim	7
6	Arenac	2
7	Baraga	8
8	Barry	9
9	Bay	16
10	Benzie	9
11	Berrien	34
12	Branch	15
13	Calhoun	45
14	Cass	10
15	Charlevoix	25
16	Cheboygan	10
17	Chippewa	28
18	Clare	3
19	Clinton	4
20	Crawford	3
21	Delta	19
22	Dickinson	10
23	Eaton	16
24	Emmet	52
25	Genesee	71
26	Gladwin	0
27	Gogebic	11
28	Grand Traverse	13
29	Gratiot	10
30	Hillsdale	9
31	Houghton	42
32	Huron	27
33	Ingham	53
34	Ionia	16
35	Iosco	4
36	Iron	79
37	Isabella	6
38	Jackson	30
39	Kalamazoo	56
40	Kalkaska	0
41	Kent	59
42	Keweenaw	41
43	Lake	3
44	Lapeer	24
45	Leelanau	25
46	Lenawee	44
47	Livingston	14
48	Luce	1
49	Mackinac	27
50	Macomb	16
51	Manistee	19
52	Marquette	39
53	Mason	11
54	Mecosta	3
55	Menominee	11
56	Midland	28
57	Missaukee	2
58	Monroe	19
59	Montcalm	3
60	Montmorency	0
61	Muskegon	17
62	Newaygo	5
63	Oakland	83
64	Oceana	8
65	Ogemaw	0
66	Ontonagon	6
67	Osceola	1
68	Oscoda	0
69	Otsego	3
70	Ottawa	29
71	Presque Isle	16
72	Roscommon	1
73	Saginaw	41
74	St. Clair	24
75	St. Joseph	16
76	Sanilac	12
77	Schoolcraft	6
78	Shiawassee	45
79	Tuscola	14
80	Van Buren	8
81	Washtenaw	87
82.1	Wayne: Detroit	284
82.2	Wayne: Other	92
82.3	Wayne: Duplicates	(1)
82.4	Wayne: Total	374
83	Wexford	9
(duplicates)		(3)
Total:		2,004

== Alcona County ==
	Name on the Register	Image	Date listed	Location	City or town	Description
1	Sturgeon Point Light Station	Sturgeon Point Light Station	July 19, 1984 (#84001370)	Point Road; 44°42′36″N 83°16′20″W	Haynes Township	Built in 1869, the Sturgeon Point Light Station is a lighthouse on Lake Huron in Alcona County near the city of Harrisville in northeastern Lower Peninsula. It was built to ward mariners off a reef that extends 1.5 miles (2.4 km) lakeward from Sturgeon Point.

== Alpena County ==
	Name on the Register	Image	Date listed	Location	City or town	Description
1	Alpena Central Historic District	Alpena Central Historic District	September 2, 2025 (#100012172)	Roughly bounded by S. Chisholm St, W. Washington Ave, W. Fifth Ave, N. Second Ave, W. Clark St, Ford Ave, and Thunder Bay; 45°03′44″N 83°26′00″W	Alpena	
2	Alpena County Courthouse	Alpena County Courthouse	December 8, 1983 (#83003643)	720 Chisholm Avenue; 45°04′05″N 83°26′30″W	Alpena	Built in 1934 in the county seat of Alpena, this Art Deco courthouse continues to serve Alpena County.
3	Alpena Light	Alpena Light	March 29, 2006 (#06000197)	Thunder Bay River mouth, 150 feet (46 m) from shore 45°03′37″N 83°25′23″W	Alpena	The Alpena Light was constructed in 1914 to mark the entrance of Thunder Bay River at the western end of Thunder Bay. The lighthouse remains active.
4	Herman and Hattie (Ely) Besser House		August 24, 2023 (#100009278)	403 South 2nd Ave. 45°03′36″N 83°26′16″W	Alpena	
5	Bingham School	Bingham School	November 10, 2020 (#100005778)	555 South 5th Ave. 45°03′45″N 83°26′30″W	Alpena	
6	Fishing Tug Katherine V	Fishing Tug Katherine V	July 10, 2003 (#03000622)	491 Johnson Street; 45°04′53″N 83°26′57″W	Alpena	The Katherine V is a former fishing tugboat that is now on display at the Besser Museum of Northeast Michigan right next to Alpena Community College in Alpena. It is believed to be the last intact wooden fishing tug left.
7	Grecian Shipwreck Site	Grecian Shipwreck Site	February 8, 2018 (#100001835)	L. Huron; 44°58′07″N 83°12′03″W	Alpena	
8	IOOF Centennial Building	IOOF Centennial Building	December 29, 2015 (#15000944)	150 E. Chisholm St. 45°03′40″N 83°25′57″W	Alpena	This building was constructed in 1876 for Samuel E. Hitchcock and his wife, Samantha Hitchcock, two of the first settlers and most prominent citizens of the city of Alpena. In 1901 it was sold to the local chapter of the Independent Order of Odd Fellows (I.O.O.F. Alpena Lodge No. 170).
9	Middle Island Light	Middle Island Light	March 15, 2006 (#06000133)	Middle Island; 45°11′35″N 83°19′16″W	Alpena Township	Located on Middle Island about 10 miles (16 km) north of Alpena, it is about halfway between Presque Isle and Thunder Bay Island.
10	Norwegian Lutheran Church Complex	Norwegian Lutheran Church Complex	July 9, 2013 (#13000478)	10430 S. Leer Rd. (Long Rapids Township); 45°11′50″N 83°43′11″W	Leer	The Norwegian Lutheran Church Complex includes a church, parish house, cemetery, and pavilion. The church is substantially the same as when it was built in 1899. Highlights include an altar painting by Sarah Kirkeberg Raugland, and an unusual pressed metal interior in the parish house.
11	Pewabic (propeller) Shipwreck Site	Pewabic (propeller) Shipwreck Site	August 22, 2016 (#14001096)	Lake Huron; 44°57′53″N 83°06′14″W	Alpena Township	The SS Pewabic was a package freighter that served ports on the Upper Great Lakes. She was launched in October 1863, fitted out in the spring of 1864, and was in active service until she sank off Thunder Bay Island in Lake Huron on August 9, 1865, due to collision with her sister vessel.
12	Thunder Bay Island Light Station	Thunder Bay Island Light Station	July 19, 1984 (#84001371)	Thunder Bay Island; 45°02′14″N 83°11′40″W	Alpena Township	Established in 1832, it is one of the oldest operating lighthouses on Lake Huron, although the facility has undergone several additions and improvements.

== Antrim County ==
	Name on the Register	Image	Date listed	Location	City or town	Description
1	Antrim County Courthouse	Antrim County Courthouse	March 10, 1980 (#80001846)	S. Cayuga St. 44°58′33″N 85°12′29″W	Bellaire	The Antrim County Courthouse was designed in 1879, but construction did not begin until 1904. A new facility was constructed in 1977/78, and this building was vacant until restoration in 1990–92. As of 2014, it houses the Antrim County courts and prosecuting attorney.
2	Elk Rapids First Methodist Episcopal Church	Elk Rapids First Methodist Episcopal Church	December 29, 2015 (#15000945)	301 Traverse St. 44°53′48″N 85°24′56″W	Elk Rapids	The former Elk Rapids First Methodist Episcopal Church was constructed in 1901 and served the congregation until 2011. It is significant in part due to its distinctive Gothic stained glass windows. The building now houses Elk Rapids Area Historical Museum.
3	Elk Rapids Township Hall	Elk Rapids Township Hall	September 22, 1977 (#77000709)	River St. 44°53′51″N 85°24′57″W	Elk Rapids	The Elk Rapids Township Hall was built in 1883 as a theater and government center; it was used as a community center for plays, concerts, dances, political rallies and other local events.
4	Holtz Site	Holtz Site	June 19, 1973 (#73002151)	Intermediate River; 44°58′53″N 85°12′17″W	Bellaire	The Holtz Site, designated 20AN26, is an archaeological site. It was a Middle Woodland period encampment, dating to around AD 200-400, likely inhabited for a short time by people from southern Michigan who traveled north for a season.
5	Hughes House	Hughes House	May 6, 1976 (#76001024)	109 Elm St. 44°53′49″N 85°25′04″W	Elk Rapids	The Hughes House was constructed in approximately 1868 by a local carpenter as a guest house, located on the stagecoach road between Traverse City and Petoskey.
6	M-88–Intermediate River Bridge	M-88–Intermediate River Bridge	December 17, 1999 (#99001574)	M-88 over the Intermediate River; 44°58′43″N 85°12′36″W	Bellaire	The M-88–Intermediate River Bridge is a steel stringer bridge, constructed in 1931–32, with many workers provided by the Depression-era County Relief Committee.
7	Henry Richardi House	Henry Richardi House	January 18, 1978 (#78001491)	402 N. Bridge St. 44°58′49″N 85°12′37″W	Bellaire	The Henry Richardi House was originally built for Henry Richardi, a late 19th century lumber baron and industrialist, reportedly in an attempt to woo a young woman for a wife. It currently operates as the "Grand Victorian Bed and Breakfast."

== Arenac County ==
	Name on the Register	Image	Date listed	Location	City or town	Description
1	Michigan Central Railroad Standish Depot	Michigan Central Railroad Standish Depot	February 28, 1991 (#91000215)	107 N. Main St. 43°59′00″N 83°57′37″W	Standish	The Michigan Central Railroad Standish Depot is a Richardsonian Romanesque structure built using fieldstones gathered by local farmers. It served as a passenger depot until 1955, and is currently used as a welcome center along US 23.
2	Second Arenac County Courthouse	Second Arenac County Courthouse	April 15, 1982 (#82002823)	Central Ave. 44°02′50″N 83°51′14″W	Omer	The first Arenac Courthouse, dating from 1883, burned in 1889. The county built this second courthouse at the same site in 1890, but in 1892 a county-wide vote moved the county seat to Standish. This building became the Omer Masonic Hall until the Lodge move in 1997. It is now owned by the Arenac County Historical Society.

== Baraga County ==
	Name on the Register	Image	Date listed	Location	City or town	Description
1	Assinins	Assinins	May 19, 1972 (#72000591)	US 41; 46°48′43″N 88°28′33″W	Assinins	Assinins was founded in 1843 by Bishop Frederic Baraga, and is one of the earliest Catholic missions in the Upper Peninsula associated with the Bishop. Baraga built the Old St. Joseph Orphanage and School on the site in 1860; wings were added to the building in 1866 and 1877. The settlement served as an important link in establishing rapport between the local Ottawa and Chippewa tribes and settlers arriving from the east.
2	Arvon Township Hall	Arvon Township Hall	July 30, 1981 (#81000302)	Park Rd. 46°52′37″N 88°13′10″W	Skanee	In 1915, when this hall was built, the area was still a sparsely settled frontier, and the township government played an important role in the local community. The hall was used as a community center hosted public meetings. It continues to be used for meetings, as well as amateur theatrical productions, community pageants, ethnic music festivals, and other recreational activities.
3	Canyon Falls Bridge	Canyon Falls Bridge	November 30, 1999 (#99001464)	US 41 over the Sturgeon River; 46°37′31″N 88°28′13″W	L'Anse Township	The Canyon Falls Bridge is constructed of a two-hinged, girder-ribbed arch. The configuration of the bridge is highly simplified, with some minimal decoration on ancillary components. Guardrails have ornamental steel rails and balusters, and a decorative concrete pylon tops each arch pedestal. The appearance of the pylons and the profile of the arched ribs gives the bridge a distinctive Art Moderne look.
4	Herman and Anna Hanka Farm	Herman and Anna Hanka Farm	July 19, 1984 (#84001372)	Northeast of Pelkie; 46°53′37″N 88°32′17″W	Pelkie	The Hanka Farm was occupied by members of the Hanka family, Finnish immigrants, from 1896 until 1966. The farm was originally homesteaded at a time of mass immigration from Finland to the United States, as well as a migration from the mining locations in the Upper Peninsula to more rural locations. The homestead is relatively intact and unaltered from its appearance in the 1920s.
5	Hebard – Ford Summer House	Hebard – Ford Summer House	May 5, 1982 (#82002824)	Northeast of L'Anse; 46°51′33″N 88°23′50″W	Pequaming	The logging town of Pequaming was founded by Charles Hebard in 1878. In 1915, Hebard's son Daniel built this lodge as his periodic residence. In 1923, Henry Ford bought the town, the mill, and the surrounding 40,000 acres of timber. Ford used the lodge as his summer residence until 1941.
6	Kewawenon Mission	Kewawenon Mission	April 10, 1980 (#80001847)	227 Front Street (Zeba Road), between Whirl-I-Gig Road and Peter Marksman Rd. 46°47′59″N 88°25′25″W	Zeba	Now known as the Zeba United Indian Methodist Church, the Kewawenon Mission was founded by Methodist missionaries in 1832. The current church is the third such building at the site, and is a vernacular Gothic Revival building covered with hand-made shingling.
7	Sand Point Site		June 19, 1973 (#73002152)	Sand Point, NW of Baraga; 46°47′00″N 88°28′00″W	Baraga	Sand Point is a Late Late Woodland period archaeological site containing the remains of a village and 12 burial mounds.
8	US-41 (old)-Backwater Creek Bridge	US-41 (old)-Backwater Creek Bridge	December 9, 1999 (#99001508)	Abandoned US 41 over Backwater Creek; 46°45′16″N 88°29′41″W	Baraga Township	The Old US-41 – Backwater Creek Bridge is a rigidly connected Warren pony truss, 80 feet long with an 18 foot roadway. Built in 1918, it is one of the earliest examples of a standard Michigan State Highway Department pony truss design in the state.

== Barry County ==
	Name on the Register	Image	Date listed	Location	City or town	Description
1	Barry County Courthouse Complex	Barry County Courthouse Complex	August 3, 1981 (#81000303)	220 W. State St. 42°38′53″N 85°17′24″W	Hastings	The Barry County Courthouse, designed by Albert E. French, was constructed in 1892–94. The design of the building is eclectic, combining Late Victorian, Queen Anne, and Richardsonian Romanesque elements.
2	John Carveth House	John Carveth House	August 21, 1992 (#92001076)	614 W. Main St. 42°42′40″N 85°28′27″W	Middleville	The John Carveth House, also known as the Aaron Clark House or the Lone Willow Farm, is an elaborate, asymmetrical two-story Queen Anne house built in 1886 by John Carveth, lawyer and state senator.
3	Chief Noonday Group Camp Historic District	Chief Noonday Group Camp Historic District	December 13, 1996 (#96001481)	Chief Noonday Road (County Road 434) east of Briggs Rd. 42°38′24″N 85°30′07″W	Yankee Springs Township	In the late 1930s, two group camps in the Yankee Springs Recreation Area were constructed by the National Park Service's Recreation Development Area program: the Chief Noonday Outdoor Center and the nearby Long Lake Outdoor Center, also on the Register.
4	Austin H. and Frankie A. Dwight Summer House	Austin H. and Frankie A. Dwight Summer House	March 28, 1985 (#85000656)	11456 Marsh Rd. 42°34′56″N 85°30′51″W	Shelbyville	This house was constructed between 1901 and 1902 by Austin H. Dwight and his wife Frankie. The house was significant both for its architecture and or the use of advanced engineering techniques, where timber trusses with iron tie rods were used to house a large public space in the first floor. It was demolished in 2005. After a period of vacancy, the house was remodeled and used as the Bay Pointe Restaurant. It was demolished in 2004 and a new Bay Pointe Inn erected at the site.
5	Hickory Lodge No. 345	Hickory Lodge No. 345	April 20, 2021 (#100006410)	4558 West Hickory Rd. 42°26′30″N 85°22′36″W	Hickory Corners	
6	Long Lake Group Camp Historic District	Long Lake Group Camp Historic District	December 13, 1996 (#96001482)	10370 Gun Lake Rd. 42°37′00″N 85°29′41″W	Yankee Springs Township	In the late 1930s, two group camps in the Yankee Springs Recreation Area were constructed by the National Park Service's Recreation Development Area program: the Long Lake Outdoor Center and the nearby Chief Noonday Outdoor Center, also on the Register.
7	Michigan Central Railroad Middleville Depot	Michigan Central Railroad Middleville Depot	March 23, 2022 (#100007564)	128 High St. 42°42′47″N 85°27′57″W	Middleville	
8	Shriner-Ketcham House	Shriner-Ketcham House	March 17, 1987 (#87000186)	327 Shriner St. 42°38′11″N 85°17′05″W	Hastings	The Shriner-Ketcham House was constructed in 1868 by local dairy owner and farmer William Shriner. John C. Ketcham, a six-term U.S. Representative, purchased the house from Shriner, and lived there until his death in 1941.
9	Daniel Striker House	Daniel Striker House	January 13, 1972 (#72000592)	321 S. Jefferson St. 42°38′46″N 85°17′12″W	Hastings	Daniel Striker was an early banker and politician, and in 1870 was elected as Michigan Secretary of State, a position he held for four years. He constructed this house in the 1880s; it was contemporaneously called "the handsomest residence in Hastings." He lived there until his death in 1898.

== Benzie County ==
	Name on the Register	Image	Date listed	Location	City or town	Description
1	Benzie County Courthouse	Benzie County Courthouse	June 3, 1996 (#96000611)	7157 Crystal Ave. 44°37′39″N 86°05′46″W	Beulah	The Benzie County Courthouse was constructed in 1912 as a recreation center and hotel, named The Grand. In early 1916, Beulah won an election to become the county seat of Benzie County, and the former hotel was converted into a courthouse.
2	Frankfort Land Company House	Frankfort Land Company House	April 14, 1995 (#95000452)	428 Leelanau St. 44°38′04″N 86°14′16″W	Frankfort	The house was constructed by the Frankfort Land Company in the 1860s to provide a residence for company officials living on site. However, the existence of the house - the first stylish building constructed in the town - also advertised the confidence the Land Company had in the potential and economic vitality of Frankfort. It currently operates as the Stonewall Inn B & B, a bed and breakfast.
3	Frankfort North Breakwater Light	Frankfort North Breakwater Light	September 6, 2005 (#05000983)	Offshore end of the north breakwater, 0.4 miles southwest of the junction of Main St. and Michigan Ave. 44°37′52″N 86°15′07″W	Frankfort	The original Frankfort North Breakwater lighthouse was built in 1873; the current light was built in 1932 the end of what is now the northern concrete pier at the entrance to the harbor of Frankfort. The original pyramid style lighthouse was increased in size by placing it on top of a two-story addition.
4	Gwen Frostic Studio	Gwen Frostic Studio	March 26, 2021 (#100006321)	5140 River Rd. 44°37′08″N 86°08′15″W	Benzonia Township	The Gwen Frostic Studio was opened by artist and entrepreneur Gwen Frostic in 1964. She used the building both as her personal residence and to house all aspects of her business. The size of the building grew over the years as her business expanded, eventually housing 21,000 square feet. Frostic lived and worked there until her death in 2001.
5	Mills Community House	Mills Community House	August 21, 1972 (#72000593)	891 Michigan Ave. 44°37′08″N 86°06′05″W	Benzonia	Mills Community House was built in 1909 as Mills Cottage, the girl's dormitory and president's residence for Benzonia Academy. It is significant for its association with Bruce Catton (an alumnus of the Academy and Pulitzer Prize-winning historian), who lived there when his father was president. The Academy went defunct in 1918, and the building was turned into a community center with meeting spaces, a performance space, and housing for the library.
6	Navigation Structures at Frankfort Harbor	Navigation Structures at Frankfort Harbor	September 12, 1997 (#97000973)	2nd St. 44°37′49″N 86°14′52″W	Frankfort	The Navigation Structures at Frankfort Harbor consist of a pair of piers and a pair of breakwaters. The piers, built in 1867–73, have been substantially modified over time, including being significantly shortened after the 1932 completion of the breakwaters.
7	Platte River Campground	Platte River Campground	April 27, 1990 (#90000605)	along the Platte River; 44°43′00″N 86°07′00″W	Sleeping Bear Dunes	The Platte River Campground Site, designated 20BZ16, is an archaeological site located along the Platte River. It is significant as a largely intact record of Middle and Late Woodland period prehistoric life over a long span of time.
8	Point Betsie Light Station	Point Betsie Light Station	July 19, 1984 (#84001375)	Point Betsie; 44°41′08″N 86°15′20″W	Frankfort	Construction on this light began in 1854 and was not completed until 1858, with service beginning in the shipping season of 1859. The light was the site of one of the earliest Life Saving Station, built in 1875 under the auspices of the United States Life-Saving Service. The Point Betsie light was the last manned lighthouse on Lake Michigan and the last Michigan lighthouse to lose its keeper.
9	Watervale Historic District	Watervale Historic District	July 10, 2003 (#03000624)	975-1422 Watervale Rd. 44°33′14″N 86°13′04″W	Blaine Township	Watervale was originally platted, and houses constructed, in the 189s by Leo F. Hale, who began logging operations in the area. Hale went bankrupt by 1900, but in 1917, Oscar H. Kraft of Chicago purchased the town and adjacent land to use as a resort. Kraft and his family have operated Watervale as a resort since that time.

=== Listings Formerly Located in Benzie County ===
The following listing was located in Benzie County at the time it was placed on the Register, but has since moved to Manistee County.

	Name on the Register	Image	Date listed	Current Location	Location when Listed	Description
1	City of Milwaukee	City of Milwaukee	December 14, 1990 (#90002221)	99 Arthur Street, Manistee, Michigan; 44°15′34″N 86°18′57″W	Marine Terminal Railyard, eastern slip, Elberta, Michigan	The City of Milwaukee was located in Elberta, Michigan (in Benzie County) when it was listed on the Register in 1990. However, it was moved to Manistee, Michigan in 2000.

== Clare County ==
	Name on the Register	Image	Date listed	Location	City or town	Description
1	Clare Congregational Church	Clare Congregational Church	December 9, 1994 (#94001424)	110 W. Fifth St. 43°49′11″N 84°46′10″W	Clare	The Clare Congregational Church (now the Clare Congregational United Church of Christ) was built in 1908–09, and is one of the few churches in Michigan that reflect the architectural adoption by early twentieth-century Protestants of the Early Christian central plan churches of the fifth- and sixth-century.
2	Clare Downtown Historic District	Clare Downtown Historic District	April 19, 2016 (#16000178)	114-120 E. Fifth St., 102-202 W. Fifth St., 112-115 E. Fourth St., 112-124 W. Fourth St., 307, 321-622 N. McEwan; 43°49′09″N 84°46′06″W	Clare	The Clare Downtown Historic District is located in the commercial center of the city, along four blocks of North McEwan Street with adjacent portions of East and West Fourth and Fifth Streets. There are 51 buildings in the district, constructed from 1873 to 2000. Most are two stories, and represent Neoclassical and Commercial Brick, with some Late Victorian, Mid-century modern, and later 20th century architectural styles.
3	George and Martha Hitchcock House	George and Martha Hitchcock House	June 21, 1982 (#82002832)	205 E. Michigan St. 43°50′11″N 84°51′53″W	Farwell	George Hitchcock went into the logging business with his brother-in-law Edmund Hall. In 1871, they founded the village of Farwell. George Hitchcock and his wife Martha hired the Detroit firm of Mason & Rice to design this house; construction was completed in 1885.

== Clinton County ==
	Name on the Register	Image	Date listed	Location	City or town	Description
1	Giles J. Gibbs Building-Sugar Bowl	Giles J. Gibbs Building-Sugar Bowl	March 15, 2000 (#00000223)	12 N. Clinton Ave. 43°00′07″N 84°33′30″W	St. Johns	This building was first constructed by Giles J Gibbs as a grocery. In 1916, Nick Pappas opened The Sugar Bowl at this location, which was run by the Pappas family until it closed in 1970.
2	Grist Mill Bridge, Dam and Mill Site	Grist Mill Bridge, Dam and Mill Site	June 1, 2015 (#15000295)	Upton Rd. from Island Rd. to Maple R. 43°05′24″N 84°24′21″W	Duplain Township	This site consists of three structures: theUpton Road Bridge, one of only three remaining Parker truss bridges in Michigan, the Elsie Mill Pond Dam, a rock and earth-filled dam with a concrete cap, and Kellogg Bros. & Johnson Mill Site, the foundation and associated remains of the 1865 Kellogg Bros. & Johnson grist mill.
3	Main Street Building, United Church of Ovid	Main Street Building, United Church of Ovid	January 13, 1972 (#72000607)	222 Main St. 43°00′25″N 84°22′16″W	Ovid	This building was constructed in 1872 as the First Congregational Church of Ovid. It was moved to this location in 1899, and used for worship until 1972. It is a frame Gothic Revival structure with a 75 feet (23 m) tall, three-stage two-story square tower topped with an octagonal belfry contains unique decorative touches.
4	Stony Creek Bridge	Stony Creek Bridge	November 30, 1999 (#99001467)	Private road over Stony Creek; 42°54′54″N 84°34′48″W	Olive Township	The Stony Creek Bridge, built in 1880, is wrought iron pin-connected Queen post truss bridge It is the last example of a Queen post truss bridge extant in Michigan.

=== Former listings in Clinton County ===
	Name on the Register	Image	Date listed	Date removed	Location	City or town	Description
1	East Ward School	East Ward School	May 12, 1980 (#80001850)	April 27, 2026	106 N. Traver St. 43°00′06″N 84°32′56″W	St. Johns	The East Ward School was constructed in 1876 from plans by Bay City architect Oliver Hidden. It was unusual for its size and its elaborate brickwork. The school building has been replaced with a housing development and a preschool.
2	Union School	Union School	May 15, 1980 (#80001851)	April 27, 2026	205 W. Baldwin St. 42°59′52″N 84°33′39″W	St. Johns	The Union School was a state-of-the-art school when it was built in 1885. It served as a school for the St. Johns district until 1986. The building has been replaced with a housing development.

== Crawford County ==
	Name on the Register	Image	Date listed	Location	City or town	Description
1	Douglas House	Douglas House	September 23, 2001 (#01001017)	6122 E. County Road 612; 44°48′08″N 84°28′57″W	Lovells Township	The Douglas House, also known North Branch Outing Club, was constructed in 1916 by Thomas E. Douglas to draw wealthy tourists to the area. Early club members included Henry Ford and his son Edsel, John and Horace Dodge, and Charles Nash.
2	Edward E. Hartwick Memorial Building	Edward E. Hartwick Memorial Building	October 1, 1998 (#98001216)	3896 Hartwick Pines Rd. 44°44′25″N 84°39′14″W	Grayling Charter Township	The Edward E. Hartwick Memorial Building is a 1-1/2 story rustic log structure built entirely of Michigan pine, and is one of the few remaining examples of the rustic log architecture used in the 1920s and 1930s by the Michigan State Park system.
3	M-72–Au Sable River Bridge	M-72–Au Sable River Bridge	December 9, 1999 (#99001510)	M-72 over the Au Sable River; 44°39′35″N 84°42′44″W	Grayling	The bridge is significant as perhaps the earliest rigid-frame bridge built by the Michigan State Highway Department, and is the only example of a steel (as opposed to concrete) rigid-frame bridge in Michigan.

== Dickinson County ==
	Name on the Register	Image	Date listed	Location	City or town	Description
1	Ardis Furnace	Ardis Furnace	June 29, 1972 (#72000608)	Aragon and Antoine Sts. 45°50′13″N 88°03′10″W	Iron Mountain	In 1908, John T. Jones built this experimental blast furnace, named the "Ardis Furnace" after his daughter, to test an iron extraction process he developed. The furnace as originally built was a huge rotating metal tube installed at a slight incline and held in place by a series of concrete supports. The Ardis Furnace was initially a success, but a fundamental heat problem limited its durability, and within two years Jones lost his personal fortune and the project was abandoned. Some elements of Jones's technology were incorporated into later successful operations, but the ruins of the concrete supports are the only remnants of the Ardis furnace.
2	Chapin Mine Steam Pump Engine	Chapin Mine Steam Pump Engine	July 9, 1981 (#81000305)	300 Kent St. 45°49′30″N 88°04′12″W	Iron Mountain	The Chapin Mine Steam Pump Engine, also known as The Cornish Pump, was built by the E. P. Allis Company (now Allis-Chalmers) in 1890–91, and is still the largest reciprocating steam-driven engine ever built in the United States. It was use in the 1890s at the Chapin Mine "D" shaft, and from 1907 to 1914 at the nearby Ludington Mine "C" shaft. At the "C" shaft, the engine was connected to a series of eight pumps, the deepest of which was 1,500 feet (460 m) below ground. The total capacity of the pump system was 3,400 US gallons (13,000 L) per minute. The system was replaced in 1914 by electric pumps, and the Cornish Pump has served as a tourist attraction since 1934.
3	Dickinson County Courthouse and Jail	Dickinson County Courthouse and Jail	May 15, 1980 (#80001852)	700 S. Stephenson Ave. 45°49′02″N 88°03′45″W	Iron Mountain	The Dickinson County Courthouse and Jail was built in 1896. It is a rock faced red brick Romanesque Revival-style structure designed by architect James E. Clancy of Antigo, Wisconsin.
4	Graved Rock Site		November 29, 1995 (#95001389)	Address Restricted	Kingsford	The Graved Rock Site, also known as 20DK23, is an archaeological site, thought to be a ceremonial location associated with prehistoric Native Americans. It contains rock carvings.
5	Immaculate Conception Church	Immaculate Conception Church	April 5, 1990 (#90000562)	500 E. Blaine St. 45°49′59″N 88°03′20″W	Iron Mountain	The Immaculate Conception Church is an Italian Renaissance Revival church built in 1902 by Italian Catholics living on the north side of Iron Mountain. It was designed by parish priest Father Giovanni Sinopoli di Giunta, who also oversaw the construction of the building.
6	Iron Mountain Central Historic District	Iron Mountain Central Historic District	September 25, 2013 (#13000763)	Broadly Fleshiem to C St. & Iron Mountain to Stockbridge Ave. 45°49′10″N 88°04′01″W	Iron Mountain	This district covers the city's central business district and adjacent areas It is primarily commercial, but also contains the historic county courthouse complex, and school, library, and church buildings.
7	Iron Mountain Veterans Administration (VA) Hospital	Iron Mountain Veterans Administration (VA) Hospital	June 29, 2022 (#100007870)	325 East H St. 45°48′37″N 88°03′42″W	Iron Mountain	
8	Menominee River Park Archeological District	Menominee River Park Archeological District	December 7, 1995 (#95001388)	Address Restricted; 45°47′00″N 88°05′30″W	Kingsford	The Menominee River Park Archeological District is an archaeological site; the location was a campsite associated with the Woodland period, and is currently used as a recreational park.
9	Up Stream Put-In Site		November 29, 1995 (#95001390)	Address Restricted	Kingsford	The Up Stream Put-In Site, also known as 20DK27, is an archaeological site; the location was a campsite and water access associated with both the Woodland period and historic Euro-American use.
10	Upper Twin Falls Bridge	Upper Twin Falls Bridge	December 12, 2012 (#12001028)	Over the Menominee River; 45°52′39″N 88°04′43″W	Breitung Township	This highway bridge between Dickinson County, Michigan and Florence County, Wisconsin was built in 1910–11 because the Twin Falls Power Dam would soon flood the previous bridge. It is one of two pin-connected, camelback, through-truss bridges remaining in Wisconsin. Site of liquor inspections from 1914 to 1920, when Michigan was dry and Wisconsin wet.

== Gladwin County ==
There are no sites listed on the National Register of Historic Places in Gladwin County.

== Hillsdale County ==
	Name on the Register	Image	Date listed	Location	City or town	Description
1	J.J. Deal and Son Carriage Factory	J.J. Deal and Son Carriage Factory	August 1, 2012 (#12000456)	117 West St. 41°58′59″N 84°39′48″W	Jonesville	The J.J. Deal and Son Carriage Factory was built in portions over the span of 1893–1909. The company produced multiple models of the Deal Automobile here from 1908 to 1911, but went out of business in 1915. It was later used by the Kiddie Brush & Toy Company. As of 2016 it houses the Heritage Lane Apartments.
2	Grace Episcopal Church	Grace Episcopal Church	May 6, 1971 (#71000391)	360 E. Chicago St. 41°59′03″N 84°39′37″W	Jonesville	Grace Episcopal Church is a 1-1/2 story rectangular Greek Revival frame structure covered in clapboard. Built in 1844–48, it is one of the first church buildings constructed in Michigan west of Detroit, and is one of the few surviving examples of indigenous church architecture in the state.
3	E.O. Grosvenor House	E.O. Grosvenor House	December 6, 1977 (#77000713)	211 Maumee St. 41°58′55″N 84°39′35″W	Jonesville	This house was designed in 1874 by Elijah E. Myers for Ebenezer O. Grosvenor, a politician who served in the Michigan Senate, one term as the Lieutenant Governor of Michigan, and two terms as the State Treasurer of Michigan. It now operates as the Grosvenor House Museum.
4	Hillsdale County Courthouse	Hillsdale County Courthouse	August 11, 1982 (#82002835)	Howell St. 41°55′14″N 84°37′54″W	Hillsdale	The Hillsdale County Courthouse is the third permanent county building located at this site. The yellow sandstone courthouse was built in 1898–99 from a design by Jackson architect Claire Allen.
5	Hillsdale Downtown Historic District	Hillsdale Downtown Historic District	February 17, 1995 (#95000075)	Roughly bounded by Ferriss, Cook, E. Bacon, S. Howell, Waldron, N. Manning, Monroe and Hillsdale Sts. and Carlton Rd. 41°55′18″N 84°37′57″W	Hillsdale	The Hillsdale Downtown Historic District is a commercial historic district containing 95 buildings constructed from the 1860s to the 1930s. These include structures associated with many of the city's oldest civic and commercial institutions, and structures that represent many of the broad trends in American and Midwestern architecture extant during Hillsdale's history.
6	William R. Kirby Sr. House	William R. Kirby Sr. House	July 20, 1982 (#82002836)	377 State Rd. 41°55′36″N 84°34′41″W	Hillsdale	The William R. Kirby Sr. House, constructed in the 1840s, is one of the few early cobblestone houses extant in Michigan.
7	W.H.L. McCourtie Estate	W.H.L. McCourtie Estate	January 24, 1992 (#91001984)	Junction of US 12 and Jackson Rd. 42°03′08″N 84°24′30″W	Somerset Center	This estate was the birthplace of W.H.L McCourtie, a Somerset Center native who made his fortune in the Texas oil boom. McCourtie returned to Somerset Center in 1922 and built an estate as a social center of the town. Around 1930, McCourtie hired two itinerant Mexican artisans, George Cardoso and Ralph Corona, to build 17 concrete bridges here. Cardoso and Corona used a technique known as el trabejo rustico (known in French as faux bois), a Mexican folk art tradition where wet concrete is sculpted to look like wood. The cement constructions remain, and the estate is now McCourtie Park.
8	William Treadwell House	William Treadwell House	(#74000984)	446 N. Meridian Rd. 41°51′47″N 84°21′53″W	Hudson	This house is a two-story brick Italian Villa built for William Treadwell in the early 1860s. Before it was finished, Treadwell famously embezzled $66,000 from the bank he ran and fled town. He was caught, tried, and convicted, but escaped from jail and was finally murdered by an accomplice.
9	Trunk Line Bridge No. 237	Trunk Line Bridge No. 237	January 14, 2000 (#99001672)	Burt Rd. over Silver Creek; 41°46′11″N 84°34′24″W	Ransom Township	Trunk Line Bridge No. 237 was built in 1918 by the Michigan State Highway Department according to a standard plan on what was then State Highway 308. The bridge is a concrete, barrel vaulted deck arch bridge. Its single arch spans 31 feet (9.4 m) across Silver Creek. The parapet railings are constructed of solid concrete and have five rectangular recesses on the inside and outside faces. The bridge currently carries the unpaved Burt Road in a rural, wooded area of Ransom Township.

== Iosco County ==
	Name on the Register	Image	Date listed	Location	City or town	Description
1	Alabaster Historic District†	Alabaster Historic District†	December 16, 1977 (#77000715)	Bounded by Lake Huron, Gypsum, Keystone, and Rempert Rds. 44°11′12″N 83°34′04″W	Alabaster	The Alabaster Historic District encompasses a former open-pit gypsum mine, along with associated processing buildings, shops, and offices, as well as the company town. The mine was established in 1862, but above-ground structures date from after an 1891 fire.
2	Cooke Hydroelectric Plant†	Cooke Hydroelectric Plant†	August 2, 1996 (#96000803)	Cook Dam Rd. at the Cook Dam on the Au Sable River; 44°28′21″N 83°34′18″W	Oscoda	The Cooke Dam began generating electricity in December 1911, with an original capacity of 9,000 kilowatts. The electrical output was transmitted 125 miles to Flint at 140,000 volts, establishing a world record.
3	Five Channels Dam Archeological District†	Five Channels Dam Archeological District†	March 13, 2002 (#01001016)	Near Five Channels Dam; 44°27′19″N 83°40′36″W	Oscoda	The Five Channels Dam Archeological District encompasses the site of the former worker's camp, used during dam construction in 1911–1912. At the completion of dam construction, the worker's camp buildings were moved to the next construction site (the Loud Dam) or razed.
4	Tawas Point Light Station	Tawas Point Light Station	July 19, 1984 (#84001453)	Tawas Point Rd. 44°15′13″N 83°26′58″W	East Tawas	The Tawas Point Light was originally constructed in 1852–53. However, the structure began to degrade, and a new lighthouse was built in 1876 at a cost of $30,000. The tower is 70 feet (21 m) tall including the base, with a diameter at base of 16 feet (4.9 m) and a diameter at parapet of 9 feet 6 inches (2.90 m) It is constructed of a brick outer wall, and an inner wall: 24 inches/8 inches thick, respectively. There is an air space between walls of 24 inches (610 mm).

== Isabella County ==
	Name on the Register	Image	Date listed	Location	City or town	Description
1	Doughty House	Doughty House	October 29, 1974 (#74000989)	301 Chippewa St. 43°36′21″N 84°46′27″W	Mount Pleasant	The Doughty House was built in about 1865 and purchased by Wilkinson Doughty, an early civic leader in Mt. Pleasant, in 1869. He was a founder of Central Michigan Normal School (now Central Michigan University), and lived here until his death in 1909.
2	Michigan Condensed Milk Factory	Michigan Condensed Milk Factory	April 7, 1983 (#83000853)	320 W. Broadway St. 43°36′17″N 84°46′54″W	Mount Pleasant	The Michigan Condensed Milk Factory (owned by the Borden family) was constructed in 1908 and used as a creamery until 1960. After laying vacant for 40 years, it was refurbished in 2003–2009, and now houses the offices of the City of Mount Pleasant.
3	Mount Pleasant Downtown Historic District	Mount Pleasant Downtown Historic District	December 15, 2014 (#14001043)	Roughly bounded by Mosher, Franklin, Illinois & Washington Sts. 43°36′16″N 84°46′34″W	Mount Pleasant	The Mount Pleasant Downtown Historic District is centered on the intersection of Broadway and Main in Mount Pleasant, and encompasses the surrounding eight blocks of commercial buildings. The district contains 70 buildings dating from the 1870s to the 1950s, primarily brick commercial structures of one or two stories representing Commercial brick, with some Late Victorian, Italianate, Art Deco, and International Style architecture.
4	Mount Pleasant Indian Industrial Boarding School	Mount Pleasant Indian Industrial Boarding School	February 28, 2018 (#100001795)	Bounded by Crawford, Pickard, Bamber, River Rds. 43°36′55″N 84°47′26″W	Mount Pleasant	The Mount Pleasant Indian Industrial Boarding School consisted of 37 buildings on 320 acres of land, with an average enrollment of 300 American Indian students per year in grades K-8. The school operated from 1893 to 1934
5	Sherman City Union Church	Sherman City Union Church	June 22, 2004 (#04000645)	11429 W. Vernon Rd. 43°43′35″N 85°04′34″W	Sherman City	The Sherman City Union Church was built in 1871 as the "Guard of American Revolution Hall", and in 1898 was refitted as a nondenominational church. The church was abandoned in about 1960, but was rescued and refurbished in 1977–78 by local citizens.
6	St. John's Episcopal Church	St. John's Episcopal Church	April 22, 1982 (#82002842)	206 W. Maple St. 43°35′59″N 84°46′40″W	Mount Pleasant	St. John's Episcopal Church was initially established as a mission church in 1876 by circuit riders. In 1882, the cornerstone of the current church, modeled on the riding stable of the English estate of the Duke of Devonshire, was laid. The Rt. Rev. George D. Gillespie consecrated the church on January 10, 1884. The church contains historic stained-glass windows representing the Holy Sacrament, St. John the Evangelist, and St. Mary, the Mother of God. In 1996, the church building underwent extensive restoration and renovations, much of which was completed by parishioners.

== Kalkaska County ==
There are no sites listed on the National Register of Historic Places in Kalkaska County.

== Lake County ==
	Name on the Register	Image	Date listed	Location	City or town	Description
1	Idlewild Historic District	Idlewild Historic District	June 7, 1979 (#79001160)	U.S. Route 10; also bounded generally by U.S. Route 10 on the north, 72nd St. on the south, Nelson Rd. on the east, and extending west of Forman Rd. on the west 43°53′29″N 85°46′58″W	Cherry Valley, Pleasant Plains, and Yates Townships, and Idlewild	Idlewild is a vacation and retirement community founded in 1912 for African-American residents. It was one of only a few resorts in the country where African-Americans were allowed to vacation and purchase property before this discrimination became illegal in 1964. At its peak it was the most popular resort in the Midwest and as many as 25,000 would come to Idlewild in the height of the summer season to enjoy camping, swimming, boating, fishing, hunting, horseback riding, roller skating and night-time entertainment. The second set of boundaries represents a boundary increase of August 6, 2010
2	Marlborough Historic District	Marlborough Historic District	September 7, 1972 (#72000630)	James Rd. 43°51′40″N 85°50′17″W	Pleasant Plains Township, Michigan	In the 1890s, the Great Northern Portland Cement Company constructed a cement plant at this site to produce cement from the local marl. Production boomed, and in 1902, the company also began construction of a nearby village, dubbed Marlborough, for plant workers. By 1905, Marlborough had 400 citizens, but production problems quickly arose, and the company entered receivership in 1906. The village houses were sold for salvage, the plant was dynamited for scrap iron, and by 1910 only ruins remained.
3	John and Katharine Tunkun Podjun Farm		March 13, 2002 (#02000160)	9581 E. One Mile Rd. 44°00′19″N 85°36′28″W	Ellsworth	John and Katharine Podjun purchased the land this farm sits on in 1914, and slowly constructed a complex of farm buildings between 1914 and 1930. The entire property is still owned by Podjun family members.

== Luce County ==
	Name on the Register	Image	Date listed	Location	City or town	Description
1	Luce County Sheriff's House and Jail	Luce County Sheriff's House and Jail	April 27, 1982 (#82002848)	411 W. Harrie St. 46°21′09″N 85°30′55″W	Newberry	The Luce County Sheriff's House and Jail was built in 1894, only 12 years after the founding of Newberry and 7 years after the organization of Luce County. The opulent structure, built to complement the nearby now-demolished courthouse, reflected the prosperity of the Victorian era community. The structure served as the jail and sheriff's residence for over 70 years. In 1975, the Luce County Historical Society rescued the jail from demolition and in 1976 reopened it as the Luce County Historical Museum.

== Mason County ==
	Name on the Register	Image	Date listed	Location	City or town	Description
1	S.S. Badger (carferry)	S.S. Badger (carferry)	December 11, 2009 (#09000679)	700 S. William Street; 43°56′57″N 86°27′05″W	Ludington	The SS Badger is a coal-fired ferry carrying both passengers and vehicles. The ship has operated in Lake Michigan since 1953, and is the only remaining coal-fired passenger vessel operating on the Great Lakes. The Badger was originally built as a rail car ferry, but in 1991–92 was refit to exclusively carry passengers and automobiles. She was designated a National Historic Landmark in 2016.
2	Big Sable Point Light Station	Big Sable Point Light Station	August 4, 1983 (#83004296)	Big Sable Point; 44°03′26″N 86°30′54″W	Ludington vicinity	The Big Sable Point Light was built in 1867; at 112 feet it is one of the few Michigan lights over 100 feet in height. The tower is built of brick, but in 1900 a steel plate encasement was constructed around the tower to protect the bricks. The station was the last light on the Great Lakes to be electrified, in 1949. The light was automated in 1968, and still serves as an aid to navigation.
3	Warren A. and Catherine Cartier House	Warren A. and Catherine Cartier House	December 10, 2014 (#14001007)	409 E. Ludington Ave. 43°57′21″N 86°26′33″W	Ludington	This house was built in 1905 for local businessman and politician Warren Antoine Cartier.
4	East Ludington Avenue Historic District	East Ludington Avenue Historic District	July 8, 2022 (#100007920)	400-800 blks. East Ludington Ave. 43°57′20″N 86°26′24″W	Ludington	
5	Haskell Manufacturing Company Building	Haskell Manufacturing Company Building	November 10, 2020 (#100005785)	801 North Rowe St. 43°57′54″N 86°26′43″W	Ludington	
6	Lake Michigan Beach House, Ludington State Park	Lake Michigan Beach House, Ludington State Park	September 30, 2013 (#13000798)	8800 W. M-116; 44°01′56″N 86°30′29″W	Hamlin Township	Architect Ralph B. Herrick designed this beach house for the Ludington State Park in 1933; the beach house was constructed by the Civilian Conservation Corps in 1935.
7	Ludington North Breakwater Light	Ludington North Breakwater Light	September 6, 2005 (#05000982)	North Breakwater offshore end, 0.5 miles west of Ludington Ave. at M-116; 43°57′13″N 86°28′10″W	Ludington	The Ludington Light Station was established in 1871, but the first light was not lit until 1924. The light tower is structurally part of the reinforced concrete pier beneath it. The light was automated in 1972, and is still used.
8	Ludington United States Coast Guard Station	Ludington United States Coast Guard Station	May 17, 2010 (#10000264)	101 S Lakeshore Dr. 43°57′12″N 86°27′34″W	Ludington	The first life-saving station at Ludington. was built in 1883. In 1933, the original station was moved to become a private residence, and the set of building currently at the site were constructed. In 2003, ground was broken on a new station nearby, and the Coast Guard moved into this building the next year.
9	Mason County Courthouse	Mason County Courthouse	May 19, 1988 (#88000602)	300 E. Ludington Ave. 43°57′17″N 86°26′40″W	Ludington	The Mason County Courthouse was built in 1893–94, and is the fourth structure to serve as a courthouse for Mason County. It is a Richardsonian Romanesque structure built of Jacobsville sandstone from Houghton County.
10	Not-A-Pe-Ka-Gon Site	Not-A-Pe-Ka-Gon Site	July 27, 1973 (#73002155)	Address Restricted	Mason County	The oral tradition of the Odawa people holds that the Not-A-Pe-Ka-Gon Site, along the Pere Marquette River, was the site of an important 17th century battle between the Odawa and Mascouten peoples. Many men from both sides of the conflict died in the battle, and their skulls were placed on sticks along the riverbank; the site became known as "Notipekago" or "Notipekagon" - literally, "heads on sticks."
11	Scottville School	Scottville School	May 30, 2001 (#01000571)	209 N. Main St. 43°57′25″N 86°16′48″W	Scottville	The Scottville School was constructed in 1888, and served as Scottville's only school until the 1950s. Additions were made to the school in 1893, 1903, 1911, and 1927. It was used as the high school and middle school until 1976.

== Mecosta County ==
	Name on the Register	Image	Date listed	Location	City or town	Description
1	Fairman Building	Fairman Building	February 12, 1987 (#87000072)	102-106 S. Michigan Ave. 43°41′53″N 85°28′54″W	Big Rapids	The Fairman Building was constructed in 1880 for businessman Ferdinand Fairman, who dealt in a substantial amount of real estate, investment, and other non-lumbering activities in what was then a primarily lumbering town. In 2003, the Fairman Building, along with the nearby Nisbett Building, were refurbished into senior citizen housing, and are now known as the Nisbett-Fairman Residences.
2	Morgan West Wheatland Cemetery	Morgan West Wheatland Cemetery	December 16, 2014 (#14001044)	55th Ave. between 10 & 11 Mile Rds. 43°36′55″N 85°11′34″W	Wheatland Township	The Morgan West Wheatland Cemetery was established in 1864, as African American settlers began migrating to Isabella, Mecosta, and Montcalm Counties. It contains over 50 nineteenth century burial plots, and is still in use today.
3	Nisbett Building	Nisbett Building	December 4, 1986 (#86003452)	101 S. Michigan Ave. 43°41′53″N 85°28′54″W	Big Rapids	Daniel F. Comstock began construction began on the Nisbett Building in 1885; after enclosing and partially completing the ambition project, Comstock went bankrupt. The building was eventually purchased and finished in 1900 by William Nisbett. In 2003, the Nisbett Building, along with the nearby Fairman Building, were refurbished into senior citizen housing, and are now known as the Nisbett-Fairman Residences.

== Missaukee County ==
	Name on the Register	Image	Date listed	Location	City or town	Description
1	Aetna Earthworks	Aetna Earthworks	March 30, 1973 (#73002157)	Address Restricted	Aetna Township	The Aetna Earthworks consists of two circular ditch-and-bank structures of around 50 metres (160 ft) diameter located atop a glacial esker. The layout of the site is thought to represent the Midewiwin origin tale of Bear's Journey.
2	Boven Earthwork		August 14, 1973 (#73002293)	Address Restricted	Lake City	The Boven Earthworks includes four enclosures, with an associated burial mound.

== Montcalm County ==
	Name on the Register	Image	Date listed	Location	City or town	Description
1	Giles Gilbert House	Giles Gilbert House	February 12, 1987 (#87000137)	306 N. Camburn St. 43°17′40″N 85°04′48″W	Stanton	Giles Gilbert was a significant figure in the lumbering business in Stanton in the late 1860s-early 1880s. In 1877, he built this house for his own use, and lived there until 1882, when he moved to Mecosta, Michigan, to continue lumbering. The house in Stanton was later owned by James Willet, another prominent lumberman and mayor of Stanton.
2	Greenville Downtown Historic District	Greenville Downtown Historic District	November 19, 2008 (#08001104)	Lafayette between Montcalm and Benton and adjacent block of Montcalm, Grove, Cass, and Washington on either side 43°10′48″N 85°15′09″W	Greenville	The Greenville Downtown Historic District is a commercial historic district containing 60 contributing buildings dating from the later nineteenth and early twentieth centuries. The oldest dates to 1869.
3	Winter Inn	Winter Inn	April 17, 1980 (#80001883)	100 N. Lafayette St. 43°10′52″N 85°15′09″W	Greenville	The Winter Inn, built in 1902 by Thomas B. Winter, is significant as a still-functioning example of a modest, locally-owned hotel of a type once common in small towns like Greenville.

== Montmorency County ==
There are no sites listed on the National Register of Historic Places in Montmorency County.

== Newaygo County ==
	Name on the Register	Image	Date listed	Location	City or town	Description
1	Croton Dam Mound Group		June 23, 2009 (#08000846)	Address Restricted; 43°26′15″N 85°39′45″W	Croton	The Croton Dam Mound Group consists of three mounds designated Croton Dam A (20NE105), Croton Dam B (20NE112), and Croton Dam C (20NE116). The largest mound, Croton Dam A, measures about 35 feet in diameter, and included a cache of animal bones and weapons points. The two smaller mounds, Croton Dam B and C, contained red ochre and cremated human remains.
2	Croton Hydroelectric Plant	Croton Hydroelectric Plant	August 16, 1979 (#79001165)	Croton Dam Road; 43°26′13″N 85°39′55″W	Croton	Croton Dam was built in 1907 under the direction of William D. Fargo by the Grand Rapids - Muskegon Power Company, a predecessor of Consumers Energy. The 40-foot-high (12 m) dam impounds 7.2 billion U.S. gallons (6 billion imp. gal/27 billion L) of water in its 1,209-acre (489 ha) reservoir and is capable of producing 8,850 kilowatts at peak outflow. The Croton Dam is one of the earliest examples of the use of hydraulic sluicing in construction east of the Mississippi River. The complex also includes the adjoining powerhouse.
3	Fremont High School	Fremont High School	September 4, 2013 (#13000669)	204 E. Main; 43°28′00″N 85°56′27″W	Fremont	The former Fremont High School consists of three distinct sections: the original two-story Arts and Crafts-inspired 1926 school building, a one- and two- story 1961 International Style gymnasium/natatorium, and a 1988 connector between the two earlier buildings. The building was vacated in fall 2012.
4	Hardy Hydroelectric Plant	Hardy Hydroelectric Plant	December 1, 1997 (#97001479)	6928 East 36th Street; 43°29′13″N 85°38′02″W	Newaygo	At the time of its completion in 1931, the Hardy Dam was the largest earthen dam in North America east of the Mississippi, and is still the third largest earthen dam in the world and the largest east of the Mississippi River.
5	Toft Lake Village Site		June 20, 1972 (#72001476)	near Toft Lake; 43°29′16″N 85°44′22″W	Everett Township, Michigan	The Toft Lake Village Site, also known by the designation 20NE110, is an archaeological site that was once a Late Middle Woodland village situated on 10 acres on the sandy shore of Toft Lake.

== Oceana County ==
	Name on the Register	Image	Date listed	Location	City or town	Description
1	Dumaw Creek Site	Dumaw Creek Site	November 15, 1972 (#72001477)	Dumaw Crk, NE of Pentwater, Michigan; 43°48′30″N 86°22′30″W	Pentwater	The Dumaw Creek site was once a 17th-century village and cemetery. Archeological artifacts and human remains were discovered on this site in 1915.
2	Jared H. Gay House	Jared H. Gay House	January 26, 1989 (#88003235)	Rt. 2, 128th Ave. 43°46′33″N 86°14′16″W	Crystal Valley	The Jared H. Gay House is a log house built in 1861 by Jared Gay and his wife Catherine. The Gays were the first permanent European settlers in the area, and were instrumental in the development of Crystal Valley. They lived in this house until 1902.
3	Green Quarry Site		November 9, 1972 (#72001478)	Address Restricted	Mears	The Green Quarry Site, covering 40 acres (16 ha), is the only known source of Lambrix chert, which was used for a variety of prehistoric tools.
4	Hart Downtown Historic District	Hart Downtown Historic District	November 24, 2015 (#15000814)	Along S. State St., roughly bounded by Main, Dryden, Water, and Lincoln Sts. 43°42′07″N 86°21′51″W	Hart	The Hart Downtown Historic District encompasses the central business district of the city. Structures in the district are primarily commercial, but include single family homes and government building as well. The buildings are predominantly one or two stories, and use a variety of construction materials, of which brick and block are most common. Architectural styles include Italianate, Art Moderne and Mid-Century Modern.
5	Little Sable Point Light Station	Little Sable Point Light Station	July 19, 1984 (#84001827)	Little Sable Point; 43°39′04″N 86°32′21″W	Golden Township	The Little Sable Point Light was constructed in 1874 from a design by Col. Orlando M. Poe. The light sits atop a brick tower with a stone base. Prior to 1900, the brick was left in its natural color and state, as it was unusually hard and held up well to the elements. In 1900 the light was painted white for the first time, to assuage the complaints of mariners who said the brick was difficult to see. It remained that color until 1975, when it was sand blasted, and returned to its natural color. The lantern is capped by a copper roof.
6	Charles Mears Silver Lake Boardinghouse	Charles Mears Silver Lake Boardinghouse	July 31, 1986 (#86002115)	Corner of Lighthouse and Silver Lake Channel Rds. 43°39′20″N 86°32′15″W	Mears	Charles Mears was a Chicago lumberman who controlled timberland and owned mills across Michigan. Mears built a number of boardinghouses for his workers; this boardinghouse was constructed in 1866.
7	Navigation Structures at Pentwater Harbor	Navigation Structures at Pentwater Harbor	January 11, 2001 (#00001638)	Western end of Lowell St. 43°46′51″N 86°26′25″W	Pentwater	The Navigation Structures at Pentwater Harbor include a pair of concrete piers flanking the channel from Lake Michigan to Pentwater Lake, and the pierhead lights at the end of each pier. The channel itself dates to 1855, when Charles Mears first dredged it for his lumber business.
8	US 31-Pentwater River Bridge		December 20, 1999 (#99001534)	US 31 over the Pentwater River; 43°44′29″N 86°23′22″W	Weare Township	The US 31–Pentwater River Bridge is a three-span steel bridge with a total length of 270 feet (82 m). The two anchor spans are 84 feet (26 m) long and cantilever over the piers to support the 102-foot (31 m) center span, 60 feet (18 m) of which is suspended.

== Ogemaw County ==
There are no sites listed on the National Register of Historic Places in Ogemaw County.

== Ontonagon County ==
	Name on the Register	Image	Date listed	Location	City or town	Description
1	Bergland Administrative Site	Bergland Administrative Site	July 9, 2005 (#05000103)	M-28; 46°31′38″N 89°16′59″W	Bergland	The Bergland Administrative Site, also known as the Bergland Ranger Station, is a government administrative complex consisting of six buildings, built in 1936 by the Civilian Conservation Corps. It was one of the first administrative offices built in the Ottawa National Forest, and now houses the Bergland Cultural & Heritage Center and The Bergland/Matchwood Historical Society Museum.
2	Ernest J. and Edna Humphrey Farm		July 8, 2022 (#100007921)	878 South Cedar St. 46°31′39″N 89°16′54″W	Ewen	
3	Ontonagon County Courthouse	Ontonagon County Courthouse	November 14, 1980 (#80001888)	601 Trap St. 46°52′27″N 89°18′40″W	Ontonagon	The Ontonagon County Courthouse is a two-story Romanesque Revival structure, designed by the architectural firm of Charlton, Gilbert & Demar, and built of brick on a sandstone foundation. Three sides have similar facades a central entrance in a gabled pavilion flanked by tall double-hung windows. The building was completed in 1886, but a disastrous 1896 fire destroyed most of the city, including this courthouse. The foundation and brick walls were salvaged, and the interior was redesigned and rebuilt.
4	Ontonagon Harbor Piers Historic District	Ontonagon Harbor Piers Historic District	December 4, 2001 (#01001313)	Ontonagon River at Lake Superior; 46°52′36″N 89°19′39″W	Ontonagon	In 1860, the Army Corps of Engineers began designing pier structures in Ontonagon at the mouth of the river. The initial construction of the Ontonagon piers was carried out during 1868–1872, and further additions and reconstructions were carried out through the rest of the nineteenth century and into the twentieth. The east and west entrance piers are now 2,315 feet and 2,563 feet long, respectively
5	Ontonagon Lighthouse	Ontonagon Lighthouse	October 7, 1975 (#75000960)	Off M-64; 46°52′25″N 89°19′07″W	Ontonagon	The original Ontonagon Lighthouse, a wooden structure, was built in 1852/53. This lighthouse quickly deteriorated, and the current lighthouse, constructed of brick, was built in 1866. This lighthouse is a rectangular, 1-1/2-story cream-colored brick keeper's house on a stone foundation, integral with a three-story, 34-foot tall tower. The lighthouse was decommissioned in 1964, and ownership of the structure was transferred to the Ontonagon County Historical Society in 2003. The society undertook a complete restoration of the structure, and conducts tours for visitors.
6	Ontonagon School	Ontonagon School	May 25, 2011 (#11000308)	301 Greenland Rd. 46°52′08″N 89°18′36″W	Ontonagon	The Ontonagon School was originally constructed in 1912 as a high school. The architecturally significant portion of the building is the 1938 elementary school addition. This building, was designed by architect A.B. Nelson to be child-friendly, and features stained-glass art, floor- and wall-tiles with fairytale characters, built-in child-sized benches, reversing blackboards, and an Art Deco fish pond in the kindergarten room.

== Osceola County ==
	Name on the Register	Image	Date listed	Location	City or town	Description
1	Evart Downtown Historic District	Evart Downtown Historic District	August 11, 2025 (#100012093)	Chiefly, North and South Main Street bounded by East Eighth Street, East Fifth Street, River Street, and Pine Street; 43°54′04″N 85°15′34″W	Evart	

== Oscoda County ==
There are no current listings in Oscoda County.

=== Former listing ===
	Name on the Register	Image	Date listed	Date removed	Location	City or town	Description
1	Oscoda County Courthouse	Oscoda County Courthouse	August 25, 1972 (#72000651)	July 10, 2023	311 Morenci Ave (M-33) between 10th and 11th 44°38′57″N 84°07′45″W	Mio	The Oscoda County Courthouse was built in 1888–89 at a cost of about $3800 by George E. Hunter from a Classical Revival design by architects Pratt and Koeppe. Unlike the stone and brick courthouses commonly built at the time, the Oscoda County Courthouse is a modest wood frame building, originally sided with wooden clapboards. The building is fronted by a projected bay topped with a hip-roofed steeple. One-story wings extend from both sides of the courthouse. The courthouse was completely destroyed by fire May 5, 2016.

== Otsego County ==
	Name on the Register	Image	Date listed	Location	City or town	Description
1	Frank A. and Rae E. Harris Kramer House	Frank A. and Rae E. Harris Kramer House	December 12, 2002 (#02001507)	221 N. Center Ave. 45°01′47″N 84°40′27″W	Gaylord	Frank Kramer was a Russian Jewish immigrant who settled in Gaylord and began a clothing and dry goods business known as "Kramer's Busy Big Store." He and his wife Rae built this house in 1896.
2	Johannesburg Manufacturing Company Store	Johannesburg Manufacturing Company Store	July 1, 2009 (#09000475)	10816 M-32, E., Johannesburg; 44°59′09″N 84°27′22″W	Charlton Township	The Johannesburg Manufacturing Company was incorporated in 1901 by lumbermen Ernest Salling, Rasmus Hanson, and Nels Michelson. The trio built Johannesburg as a lumber mill and company town, and the first building constructed in the new town was this company store.
3	James A. and Lottie J. (Congdon) Quick House	James A. and Lottie J. (Congdon) Quick House	August 4, 2016 (#16000509)	120 N. Center Ave. 45°01′41″N 84°40′25″W	Gaylord	James Quick was a prominent citizen of Gaylord. He built this house in 1900. In 1921, dentist Charles Saunders purchased the house, and practiced out of it for a time. Saunders lived here until 1970, and his widow lived in the house until 1999.

== Roscommon County ==
	Name on the Register	Image	Date listed	Location	City or town	Description
1	Eggleston School	Eggleston School	April 4, 1996 (#96000368)	10539 Nolan Road; 44°11′46″N 84°28′41″W	Nester Township	Built in 1934, the Eggleston School is a well preserved, former public school with two classrooms and a gymnasium. It is located in southeastern Roscommon County and now serves as a private dwelling.

== Schoolcraft County ==
	Name on the Register	Image	Date listed	Location	City or town	Description
1	Ekdahl-Goudreau Site	Ekdahl-Goudreau Site	November 16, 1978 (#78003099)	Just west of Seul Choix Point; 45°55′00″N 85°55′00″W	Restricted	The Ekdahl-Goudreau Site, also known as the Seul Choix site, is an archaeological site located a few hundred feet back from a natural harbor on Lake Michigan. Pottery artifacts date the site to the Late Woodland period.
2	Manistique East Breakwater Light	Manistique East Breakwater Light	September 6, 2005 (#05000980)	at offshore end of east breakwater, approx. 1,800 ft. from shore 45°56′41″N 86°14′52″W	Manistique	In the 1910s, a new breakwater was built to protect the Manistique harbor. When the breakwater was finished, construction was started on this light, which was put into service in 1916. As the century progressed, Manistique's importance as a port waned, and the light was automated in 1969.
3	Manistique Pumping Station	Manistique Pumping Station	October 26, 1981 (#81000316)	Deer St. 45°57′47″N 86°15′06″W	Manistique	The Manistique Pumping Station was constructed in 1921/22, and was in use as a waterworks until 1954. The tower is notable for the architectural approach to the design of the fundamentally utilitarian structure. The exterior of the tower is octagonal, and the interior has 16 sides, strengthening the eight exterior corners that supported the weight of the water tank.
4	Seul Choix Pointe Light Station	Seul Choix Pointe Light Station	July 19, 1984 (#84001846)	County Road 431; 45°55′17″N 85°54′43″W	Manistique vicinity	This light marks the location of the only harbor in a long stretch of dangerous Lake Michigan shore. Before it was constructed in 1895, there were no lighthouses in a 100-mile stretch of shoreline. The light was designed by Orlando M. Poe, who designed seven other lighthouses in the area.
5	Ten Curves Road – Manistique River Bridge	Ten Curves Road – Manistique River Bridge	December 17, 1999 (#99001538)	Ten Curves Rd. over the Manistique River; 46°14′49″N 85°55′28″W	Germfask Township	The Michigan State Highway Department developed standard plans for long-span concrete through girder bridges with arched girders on cantilevered brackets in 1921–22. An early version of this type of bridge was the 90 foot span, designated Bridge Number 750 02, built in 1923 for the Germfask crossing of the Manistique River.
6	Thunder Lake II Site		June 27, 2014 (#14000372)	near Thunder Lake; 46°06′00″N 86°28′30″W	Escanaba vicinity	An archaeological site which is part of the Woodland Period Archaeological Sites of the Indian River and Fishdam River Basins MPS.

== Van Buren County ==
	Name on the Register	Image	Date listed	Location	City or town	Description
1	Bangor Elevator	Bangor Elevator	July 14, 2009 (#09000523)	142 W. Monroe St. 42°18′46″N 86°06′37″W	Bangor	In 1873, Horace Sebring and Mitchell Hogmire constructed this grain elevator alongside the railroad tracks. The building has had multiple owners through the years, until 2002 when it was purchased by the city of Bangor, then substantially refurbished. It is now available for rental as a reception hall
2	Liberty Hyde Bailey Birthplace	Liberty Hyde Bailey Birthplace	April 18, 1983 (#83000892)	903 Bailey Ave. 42°23′31″N 86°15′50″W	South Haven	This Greek Revival farmhouse was built in 1853–1858 by Liberty Hyde Bailey Sr; in 1858, Liberty Hyde Bailey was born in this house. The younger Bailey spent 19 years living here, learning about the local wild animals and plants, before entering Michigan Agricultural College (now Michigan State University) and going on to become a well-known horticulturist, botanist and cofounder of the American Society for Horticultural Science.
3	Houppert Winery Complex	Houppert Winery Complex	March 15, 2000 (#00000222)	646 N. Nursery; 42°10′28″N 85°50′26″W	Lawton	The main stone building in this complex was constructed in 1940 by William C. Houppert, after a fire destroyed the earlier building. Due to the fire, Houppert went bankrupt in 1943, but the site was operated as a winery by Warner Vineyards until the mid-1970s. It has been refurbished and now operated at the Lawton Heritage Community Center.
4	Marshall's Store	Marshall's Store	March 20, 2002 (#02000205)	102 E. St. Joseph St. 42°13′08″N 86°03′04″W	Lawrence	Marshall's Store, also known as DeHaven's Store, was constructed in 1874 by Hannibal M. Marshall. In 1906, the store was purchased by Levi C. DeHaven, and was run by DeHaven and Henry R. Phillips until 1965, marking nearly 90 years as the main grocery and dry goods store in Lawrence. The stiore is one of the best preserved and most distinctive Italianate commercial buildings in the region.
5	Nichols Hotel	Nichols Hotel	April 7, 2025 (#100011633)	201 Center St; 42°24′17″N 86°16′26″W	South Haven	
6	Navigation Structures at South Haven Harbor, Michigan	Navigation Structures at South Haven Harbor, Michigan	October 23, 1995 (#95001160)	Mouth of the Black River at Lake Michigan; 42°24′07″N 86°17′17″W	South Haven	The light station at South Haven was established in 1872; navigational structures include piers, the original 1872 keeper's house, and a 1903 cast iron light tower.
7	Paw Paw City Hall	Paw Paw City Hall	August 21, 1972 (#72000657)	111 E. Michigan Ave. 42°13′05″N 85°53′29″W	Paw Paw	This Greek Revival structure was built in 1842–1845 as the first Van Buren County Courthouse, a function it served for over 50 years. In 1900, it was moved from the courthouse site to its present location, and now serves as the Paw Paw City Hall.
8	Van Buren County Courthouse Complex	Van Buren County Courthouse Complex	August 9, 1979 (#79001169)	212 E. Paw Paw St. 42°12′58″N 85°53′27″W	Paw Paw	This Classical Revival structure, designed in 1901 by Jackson architect Claire Allen, has served as the Van Buren County Courthouse for over 100 years.

== Wexford County ==
	Name on the Register	Image	Date listed	Location	City or town	Description
1	Cadillac Public Library	Cadillac Public Library	September 28, 2007 (#07001020)	127 Beech St. 44°15′07″N 85°23′55″W	Cadillac	The Cadillac Public Library, now the Wexford County Historical Society Museum, was constructed as a Carnegie Library in 1906 at a cost of $30,000.
2	Frank J. Cobbs House	Frank J. Cobbs House	March 31, 1988 (#88000376)	407 E. Chapin St. 44°15′01″N 85°23′38″W	Cadillac	Frank J. Cobbs was the son of Jonathan W. Cobbs, who, with William W. Mitchell, founded the lumbering firm of Cobbs & Mitchell which was a large employer in Cadillac for decades. Frank J. Cobbs built this house in 1898, the year he was married and his father died, leaving the management of Cobbs & Mitchell to Frank.
3	Cobbs and Mitchell Building	Cobbs and Mitchell Building	July 19, 2010 (#10000479)	100 East Chapin St. 44°14′54″N 85°23′52″W	Cadillac	Cobbs & Mitchell was among the largest lumbering firms in Michigan, at its high point, using 100,000 feet of raw lumber daily. In 1905, Cobbs & Mitchell hired George D. Mason of Detroit to design this brick and limestone building as a showplace for their products. The building is finished throughout using nine varieties of wood native to Michigan: elm, white maple, bird's-eye maple, sap birch, red birch, curly red birch, red beech, red oak and hemlock.
4	Cooley School		January 22, 2026 (#100012597)	221 Granite St. 44°14′26″N 85°23′57″W	Cadillac	
5	Elks Temple Building	Elks Temple Building	September 29, 1988 (#88001835)	122 S. Mitchell St. 44°14′58″N 85°23′57″W	Cadillac	The Cadillac Elks Temple, built in 1910, was designed by the Grand Rapids architectural firm of Osgood & Osgood, who specialized in designing similar buildings for fraternal organizations.
6	Masonic Temple Building	Masonic Temple Building	July 22, 1994 (#94000747)	122-126 N. Mitchell St. 44°15′05″N 85°24′00″W	Cadillac	The Cadillac Masonic Temple, built in 1899, is a three-story Romanesque brick and stone commercial building measuring 75 feet (23 m) by 100 feet (30 m).
7	Charles T. Mitchell House	Charles T. Mitchell House	December 1, 1986 (#86003369)	118 N. Shelby St. 44°15′06″N 85°23′53″W	Cadillac	In 1874, Cadillac founder George Mitchell built this house in the Second Empire style, including ornate carved woodwork inside and a mansard roof outside. Mitchell lived there until 1878; in 1922, his great-nephew Charles T. Mitchell purchased the house, and in 1926, completely renovated it to reflect the then-current Prairie School trend in architecture.
8	Old Cadillac City Hall	Old Cadillac City Hall	June 26, 1986 (#86001380)	201 Mitchell St. 44°15′05″N 85°24′02″W	Cadillac	The Cadillac City Hall was built in 1901 and used for city offices until 1977.
9	Shay Locomotive	Shay Locomotive	October 26, 1981 (#81000321)	Cass St. 44°14′56″N 85°24′00″W	Cadillac	This engine is a Shay locomotive engine designed by local logger Ephraim Shay. The Shay locomotive was small and powerful, and was built to operate on temporary tracks to haul logs. It was geared to operate on steep grades and articulated to handle sharp curves.

== See also ==
- List of National Historic Landmarks in Michigan
- List of Michigan State Historic Markers
- List of Michigan State Historic Sites
- List of historical societies in Michigan
