= Ernest J. and Edna Humphrey Farm =

- U.S. National Register of Historic Places
- Location within Michigan Location within the United States
- Interactive map
- Location: 878 South Cedar St., Ewen, Michigan
- Coordinates: 46°31′39″N 89°16′54″W
- Built: 1912
- Architectural style: American Craftsman
- NRHP reference No.: 100007921
- Added to NRHP: July 8, 2022

The Ernest J. and Edna Humphrey Farm is a farmstead located at 878 South Cedar Street in Ewen, Michigan. It was listed on the National Register of Historic Places in 2022.

== History ==
Ernest J. Humphrey was born in 1868 in Big Rapids, Michigan. In 1886 he moved to Ontonagon County to work in the lumber industry. He eventually settled in Ewen, and in 1900 married Edna Butts. The couple purchased 160 acres at this location in 1906. At first, they rented a nearby house as the farm was started. In 1912 they constructed a large barn, primarily to house horses used in Ernest's logging business. In 1917, they constructed and moved into the house on the property. Ernest continued to log and work the farm until his death in 1946.

After Ernest Humphrey died, his sons continued his logging business, with son John also managing the farm. Edna Humphrey lived in the house until her death in 1970, and for the next few years John Humphrey’s son, Jim, lived in the house. In 1974, Ernest and Edna Humphrey's estate was settled, and their daughter, Ruth Humphrey Dolphin, took possession of the house and some surrounding acreage for use as a vacation home. In 1999, the property passed from Ruth Dolphin to her children, James Dolphin and Charlotte Risto. In 2012 Charlotte purchased the entire property, and in 2013 she gave the property to her daughter, Gail Peteler.

== Description ==
The Ernest J. and Edna Humphrey Farm consists of a forty-acre parcel containing four buildings dating from early in the 20th century. The house, built in 1917, is a 1 1/2-story, side-gabled Craftsman bungalow with a brick basement and stucco exterior above. The front is three bays wide; in the center bay, concrete steps lead to the front door, which is flanked by a pair of three-over-one windows. Above, a clapboard-clad gable-roofed dormer protrudes from the roof, containing triple three-over-one windows. The side bays contain triple three-over-one windows on the first floor.

The barn, built in 1912, is a gambrel roof structure with a small gambrel roof cupola in the center of the roof. It is clad in novelty siding with an asphalt shingle roof. Also on the property are a 1921 garage, which is a one-story, frame building with a clipped gable roof, and an undated, single story log building used for storage.
