= Graved Rock Site =

Archaeological site in Michigan, United States

- U.S. National Register of Historic Places
- Nearest city: Kingsford, Michigan
- Area: less than one acre
- NRHP reference No.: 95001389
- Added to NRHP: November 29, 1995

The Graved Rock Site, also known as 20DK23, is an archaeological site located near Kingsford, Michigan. The location is thought to be a ceremonial site associated with prehistoric Native Americans, and contains rock carvings. It was listed on the National Register of Historic Places in 1995.
