= Shriner–Ketcham House =

Historic house in Michigan, United States

- U.S. National Register of Historic Places
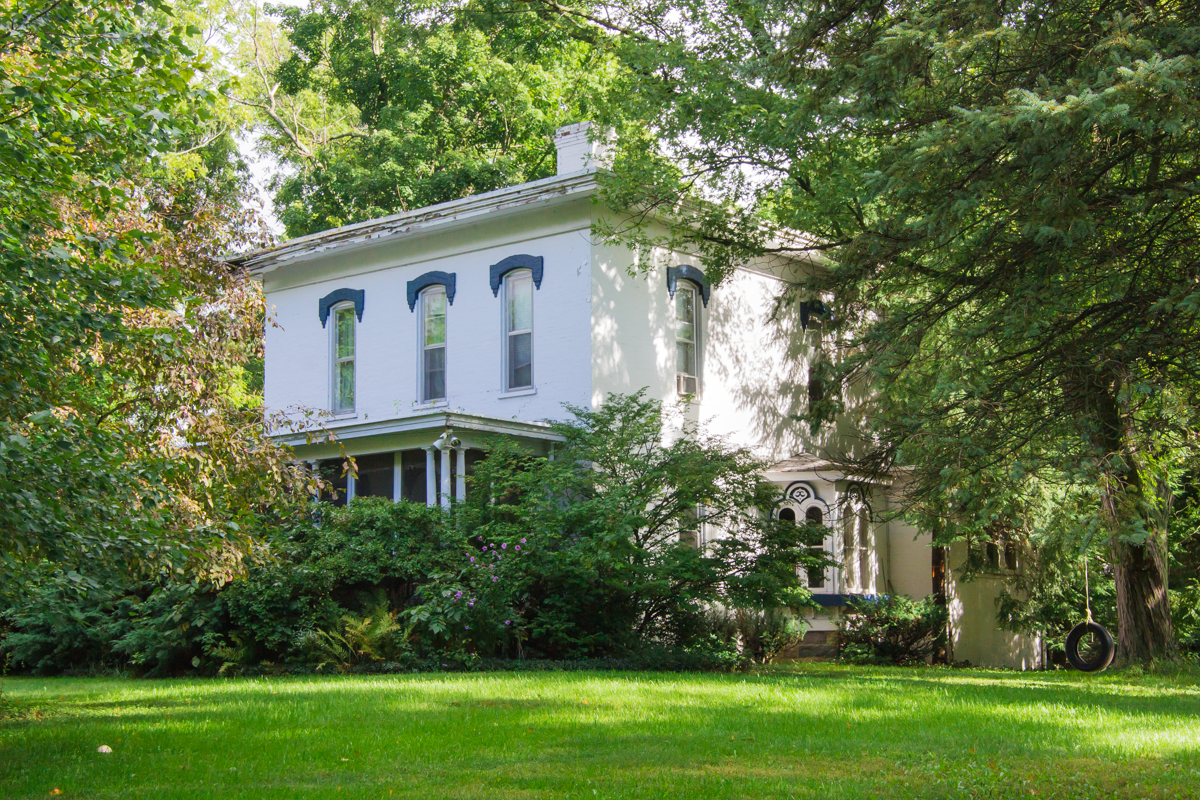

- Location within Michigan Location within the United States
- Interactive map
- Location: 327 Shriner St., Hastings, Michigan
- Coordinates: 42°38′11″N 85°17′5″W
- Area: 0.8 acres (3,200 m^{2})
- Built: 1863
- Architectural style: Italianate
- NRHP reference No.: 87000186
- Added to NRHP: March 17, 1987

The Shriner–Ketcham House, also known as Lang House, is a private house located at 327 Shriner Street in Hastings, Michigan. It was designated a Michigan State Historic Site in 1996 and listed on the National Register of Historic Places in 1985.

== History ==
Local dairy owner and farmer William Shriner and his wife Harriet purchased the land this house sits on in 1866. In 1868, he constructed this house, and extensively enlarged it in 1885. After his death, the Shriner estate sold the house and the surrounding five acres to John C. Ketcham and his wife Cora Ellen for the sum of $1,600.

At the time, John C. Ketcham was the Barry County School Commissioner, and he went on to become a six-term US Congressman from 1920 to 1932. While owning the house, Ketcham added a rear kitchen and installed a bathroom. Cora Ellen Ketcham died while Ketcham was serving in Congress, and he remarried in 1924. Ketcham continued to live in this house until his death in 1941.

In 1950, the house was purchased by Ed Caulkins, who did some substantial remodeling. The house has passed through a series of owners, and it is currently a private home.

== Description ==
The Shriner–Ketcham House is a two-story brick Italianate structure with a low hip roof on a coursed, cut granite foundation. The windows are tall and narrow with arched heads. An early 20th century porch stretches across the front and a single story early 20th century addition is connected to the rear. It is one of only three brick Italianate houses in Hastings.

On the interior, the first floor contains a living room with fireplace, a den, modern kitchen, dining are, and a laundry room. A large hallway opens onto a side porch. On the second floor are three bedrooms and a bath entered from a center hall.
