= Up Stream Put-In Site =

Archaeological site in Michigan, United States

- U.S. National Register of Historic Places
- Nearest city: Kingsford, Michigan
- Area: less than one acre
- NRHP reference No.: 95001390
- Added to NRHP: November 29, 1995

The Up Stream Put-In Site, also known as 20DK27, is an archaeological site located near Kingsford, Michigan. The location was a campsite and water access associated with both the Woodland period and historic Euro-American use. It was listed on the National Register of Historic Places in 1995.
