= Menominee River Park Archeological District =

- U.S. National Register of Historic Places
- U.S. Historic district
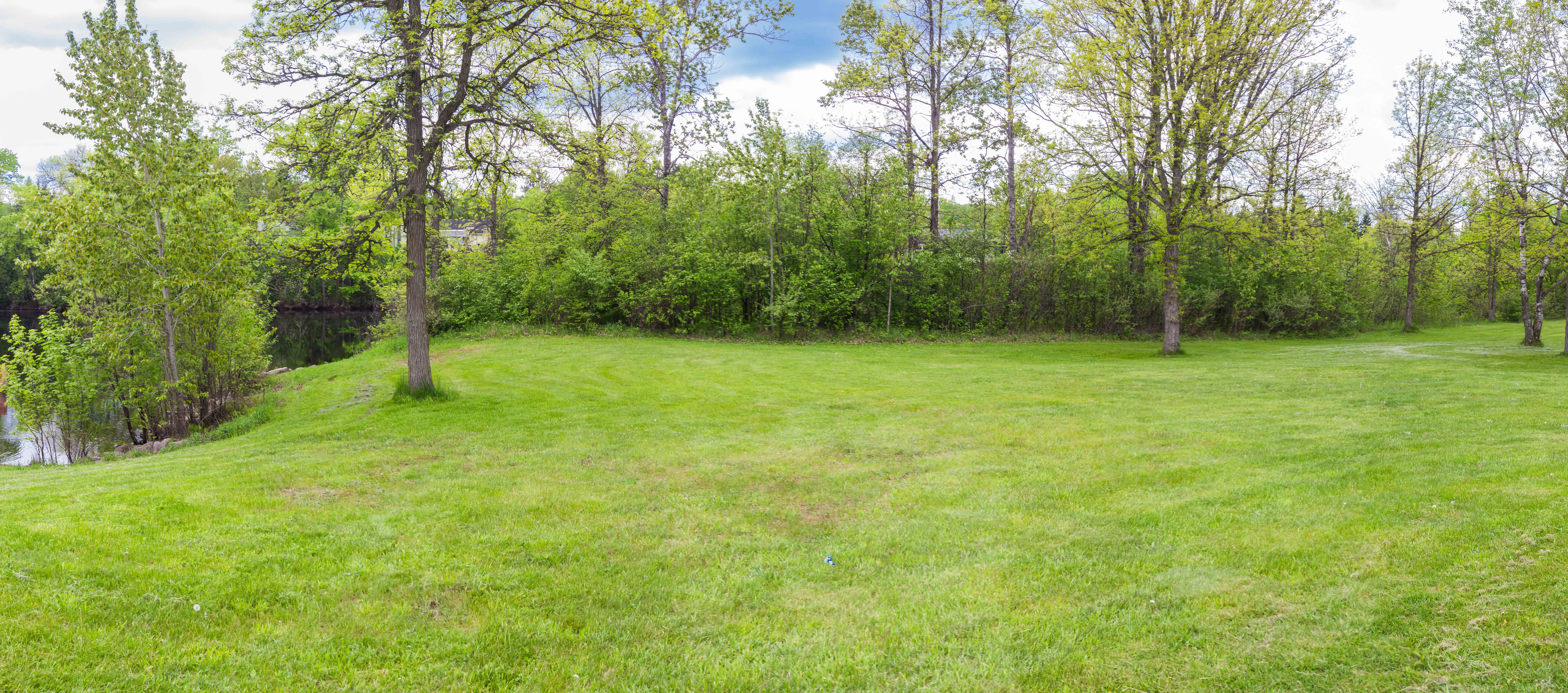

- Location within Michigan Location within the United States
- Nearest city: Kingsford, Michigan
- Coordinates: 45°47′10″N 88°5′40″W
- Area: 5 acres (2.0 ha)
- NRHP reference No.: 95001388
- Added to NRHP: December 7, 1995

The Menominee River Park Archeological District is an archaeological site located near Kingsford, Michigan. The location was a campsite associated with the Woodland period, and is currently used as a recreational park. It was listed on the National Register of Historic Places in 1995.
