= Toft Lake Village Site =

Archaeological site in Michigan, United States

- U.S. National Register of Historic Places
- Location within Michigan Location within the United States
- Location: near Toft Lake, Everett Township, Michigan
- Coordinates: 43°29′16″N 85°44′22″W
- Area: 10 acres (4.0 ha)
- NRHP reference No.: 72001476
- Added to NRHP: June 20, 1972

The Toft Lake Village Site, also known by the designation 20NE110, is an archaeological site, once a Late Middle Woodland era village, located on 10 acres on the sandy shore of Toft Lake in Everett Township, Michigan. It was listed on the National Register of Historic Places in 1972.
