= Ontonagon School =

- U.S. National Register of Historic Places
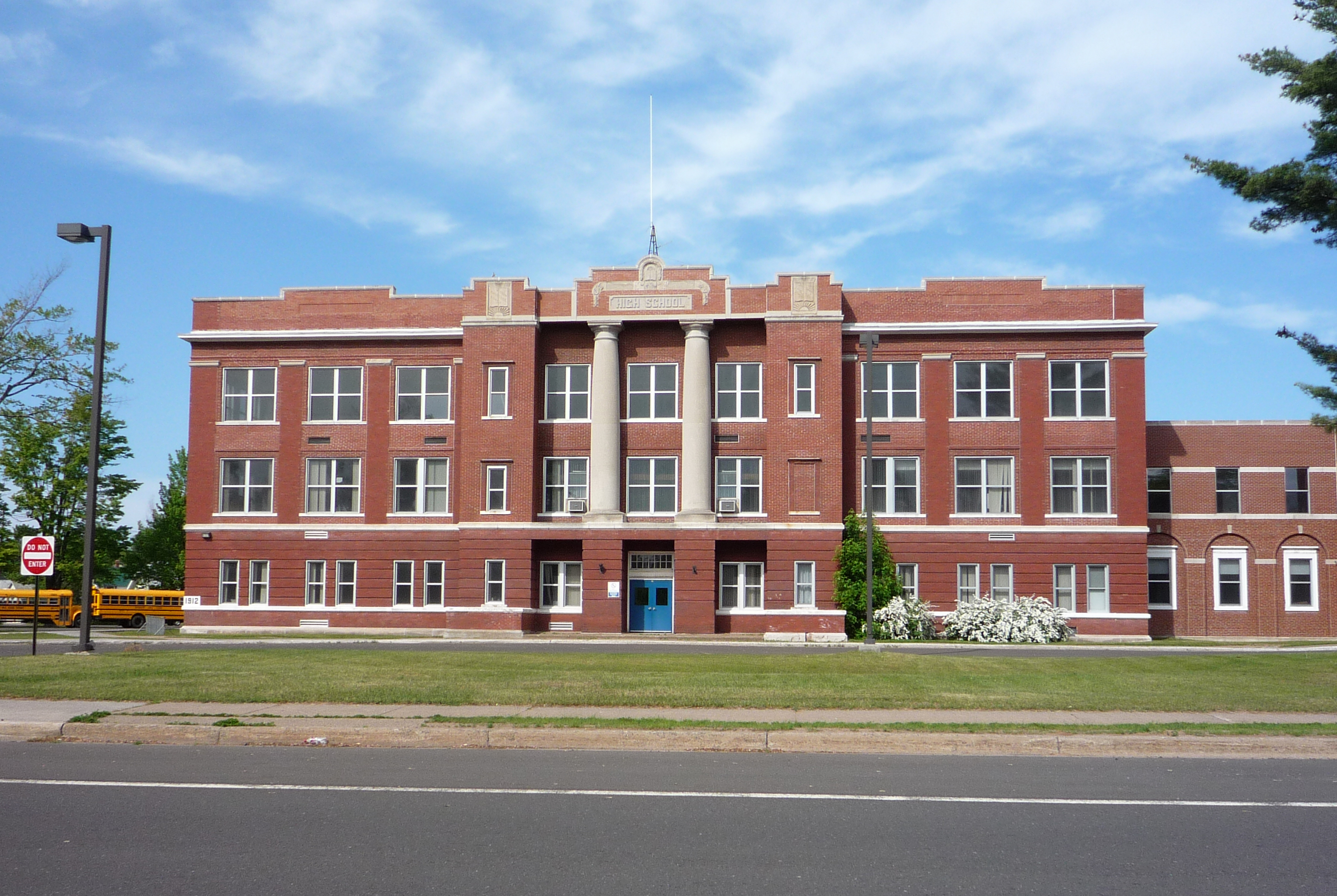

- Location within Michigan Location within the United States
- Interactive map
- Location: 301 Greenland Rd., Ontonagon, Michigan
- Coordinates: 46°52′08″N 89°18′36″W
- Built: 1912 (Original Structure); 1938 (First Addition); 1967 (Second Addition)
- Architect: Derrick Hubert; A.B. Nelson
- NRHP reference No.: 11000308
- Added to NRHP: May 25, 2011

The Ontonagon School is a former school building located at 301 Greenland Road in Ontonagon, Michigan. It was listed on the National Register of Historic Places on May 25, 2011.

== History ==
The Ontonagon School was originally constructed in 1912 as a high school, and was designed by architect Derrick Hubert. The school was officially opened at the start of the 1913-1914 school year. Much of the building was rebuilt following a fire in 1929.

In 1938, a two-story addition for elementary schooling, designed by architect A.B. Nelson of the Warren S. Holmes Company, was constructed next to the original high school building. The addition was connected to the original building on the southeast side via an annex corridor.

A third single-story section of the building was constructed in 1967 to expand the school to meet the needs of the local population. The third building section was connected to the second section on the southeast side. Also in 1967, the high school moved to another building (located on Parker Avenue) and the entire structure was used as an elementary school. The school was in continuous use until 2010, when the district consolidated all grades into the building on Parker Avenue. In December 2011, the Ontonagon school board accepted an offer, made by an undisclosed private party, to purchase the building.

== Description ==
The Ontonagon School consists of three connected buildings, constructed in 1912, 1938 and 1967. The 1938 addition is the most historically significant. This addition, constructed to house grade school children, was designed to be child-friendly. The building features stained-glass art, elaborate floor and wall tiling depicting fairytale characters, built-in child-sized benches, and reversing blackboards. The kindergarten room features a gingerbread entryway with coachlamps on each side, tilework with the Big Bad Wolf chasing the Three Little Pigs, and an Art Deco fish pond with fountain. On the second floor is a small children's theatre with a stage.

The school district discontinued use of this building after 2010 when the K-12 population was consolidated into the Ontonagon Area Senior High Building (701 Parker Ave.) that was constructed in 1967 and subsequently remodeled in 2010 to accommodate the K - 5 students, the last students to occupy the old building at 301 Greenland Road.
