= Sand Point Site =

Archaeological site in Michigan, United States

- U.S. National Register of Historic Places
- Location within Michigan Location within the United States
- Location: Sand Point
- Nearest city: Baraga, Michigan
- Coordinates: 46°47′0″N 88°28′0″W
- Area: 19.5 acres (7.9 ha)
- NRHP reference No.: 73002152
- Added to NRHP: June 19, 1973

The Sand Point Site (20BG14) is an archaeological site located near Baraga, Michigan. It was listed on the National Register of Historic Places in 1973.

Sand Point is a Late Woodland period archaeological site, containing the remains of a village and 12 burial mounds spread out over 19.5 acres (7.9 ha). It is believed to have been occupied approximately 1100-1400 AD, and contains a diverse series of artifacts, including Juntunen style and Ramey-incised ceramics, suggesting a wide trade network. Debris at the site indicates a subsistence culture surviving on small mammals, fish, berries, and acorns.

The site was rediscovered in 1968, when a private developer began a planned lakeshore redevelopment and turned up human bones. In 1970, researchers from Western Michigan University began excavations at the site, and it was listed on the National Register of Historic Places in 1973.
