= Croton Dam Mound Group =

Archaeological site in Michigan, United States

- U.S. National Register of Historic Places
- Location within Michigan Location within the United States
- Location: Croton, Michigan
- Coordinates: 43°26′15″N 85°39′45″W
- Area: 2.3 acres (0.93 ha)
- NRHP reference No.: 08000846
- Added to NRHP: June 23, 2009

The Croton Dam Mound Group, also known by the designations 20NE105, 20NE112, and 20NE116, is an archaeological site that was once a ceremonial site located on 2.3 acres near Croton, Michigan. It was listed on the National Register of Historic Places in 2009.

== Description ==
The Croton Dam Mound Group consists of three mounds designated Croton Dam A (20NE105), Croton Dam B (20NE112), and Croton Dam C (20NE116). The group represents an Early Woodland Period. The largest mound, Croton Dam A, measures about 35 feet in diameter, and included a cache of animal bones and weapons points. The two smaller mounds, Croton Dam B and C, contained red ochre and cremated human remains.
