= Alpena Central Historic District =

- U.S. National Register of Historic Places
- U.S. Historic district
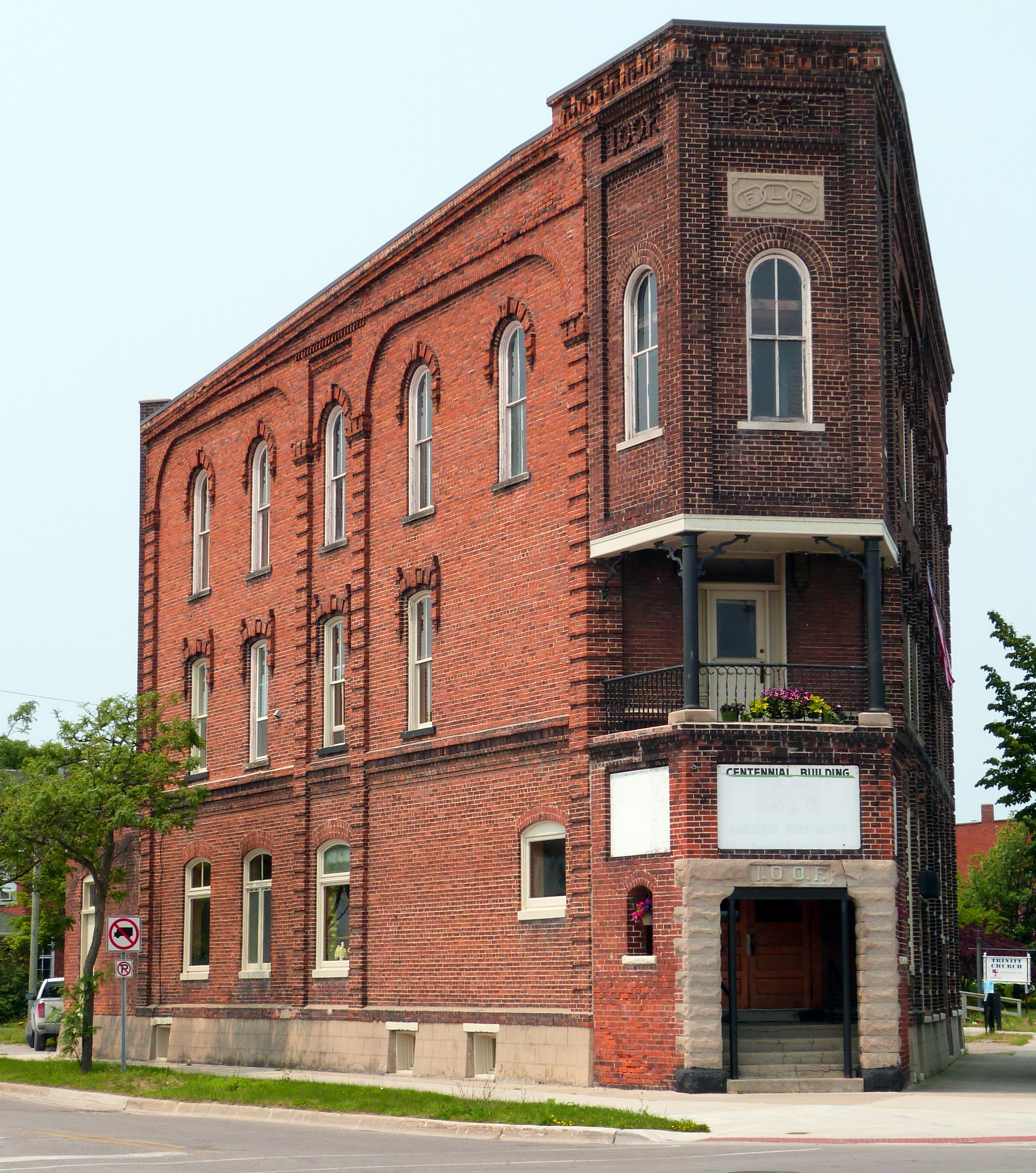
- Centennial Building / IOOF Hall

- Location within Michigan
- Interactive map
- Location: Roughly bounded by S. Chisholm St, W. Washington Ave, W. Fifth Ave, N. Second Ave, W. Clark St, Ford Ave, and Thunder Bay, Alpena, Michigan
- Coordinates: 45°03′44″N 83°26′00″W
- Built: 1867
- Architect: Clark & Munger, James Knox Taylor, James Course, Aaron H. Gould & Son
- Architectural style: Gothic Revival, Italianate, Romanesque Revival, Colonial Revival, Art Deco, Modern, Ranch
- NRHP reference No.: 100012172
- Added to NRHP: August 14, 2025

The Alpena Central Historic District is a primarily commercial historic district located in Alpena, Michigan. The district stretches along River and Water Streets from Fifth to Thunder Bay and along Second Avenue from Washington to Clark, with additional structures around Washington and Third and along the Bay and the River. The district was listed on the National Register of Historic Places in 2025.

== History ==
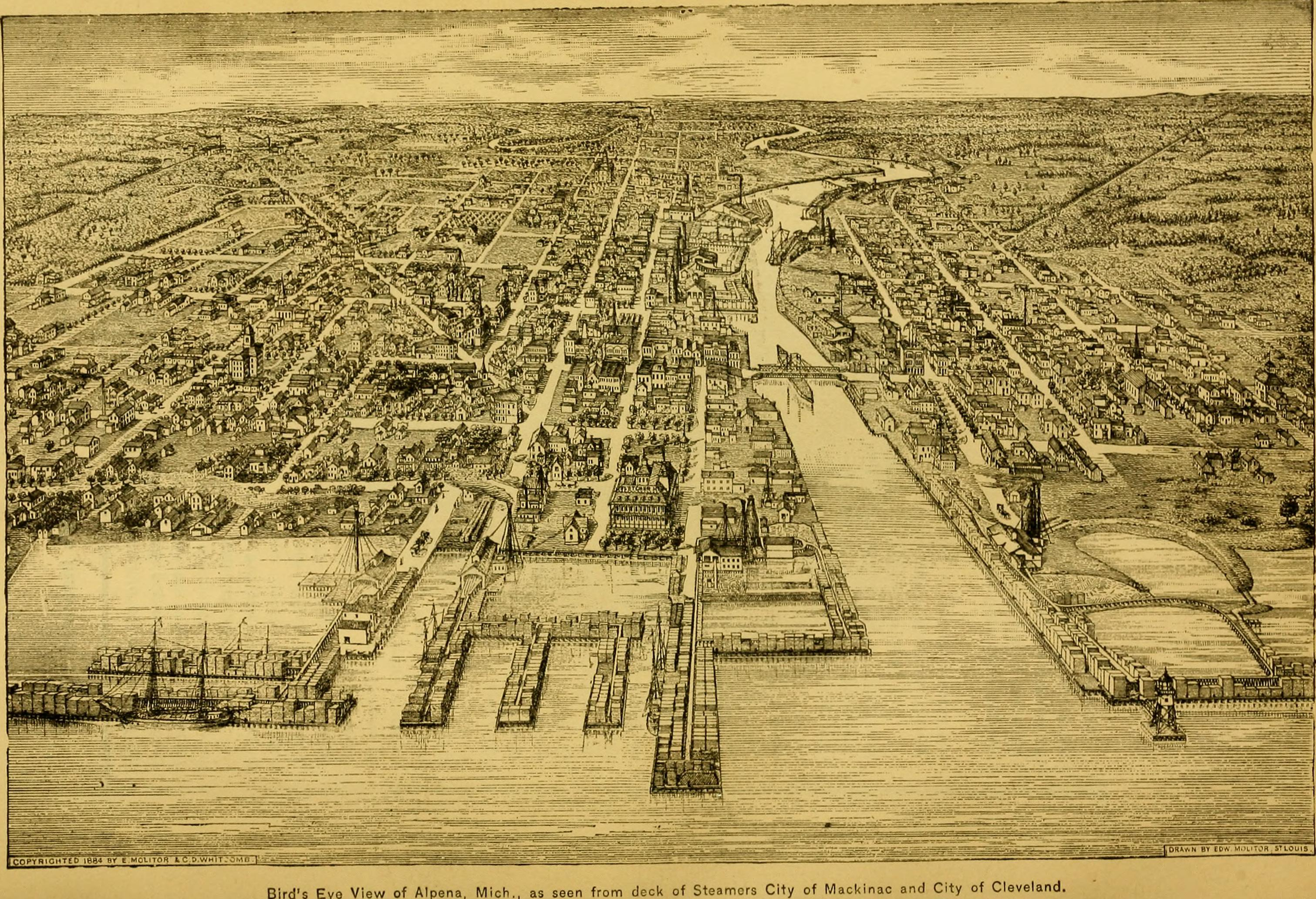
1884 map

Alpena was first laid out in 1840, and the first permanent home was constructed in 1857. The lumber industry soon moved into the area, and used the Thunder Bay River to move logs into Lake Huron. Mills and docks were constructed in Alpena to handle the trade, and the population of the area grew quickly. By 1880, 6000 people lived in Alpena, which grew to 12,000 by 1900.

As the town grew, so did the business district. By 1884, the commercial area of Alpena contained grocery stores, blacksmiths, liveries, drug stores, hardware stores, clothing stores, and dry goods stores, as well as hotels, restaurants, saloons, and theaters. The downtown grew into the 20th century; as the largest population center in northeastern Michigan, Alpena also became home to professionals such as doctors, dentists, pharmacists, insurance agents, lawyers, real estate agents, notaries, photographers, and veterinarians.

The city grew more in the 1900s, peaking at over 14,000 residents in 1960. Although many cities had a decline in their central business district due to the rise of suburban malls in the latter part of the 20th century, Alpena constructed a large shopping center adjacent to the downtown, keeping commercial businesses largely in the downtown area.

== Description ==
The Alpena Central Historic District covers most of the commercial area in Alpena, and contains 165 primary resources, with 2/3 contributing to the historic character of the district. In addition to commercial structure, the district also contains civic, recreational, and religious buildings. The earliest structure was built in 1867, and later building range in construction dates through the 1970s and later.

Much of the district is commercial brick buildings. Also included are the Alpena Municipal Marina, the Alpena Yacht Club, the Saint Bernard Catholic Church All Saints Parish, Saint Mary Catholic Church, Trinity Episcopal Church and Parish Hall, the First Presbyterian Church, Alpena City Hall, the George N. Fletcher Public Library, the United States Post Office and Federal Building, the former Alpena Freight Depot, the Alpena Water Recycling Plant, structures in the Bay View Park, the Alpena National Guard Armory, and several houses, some of which have been converted to commercial use.

== Gallery ==
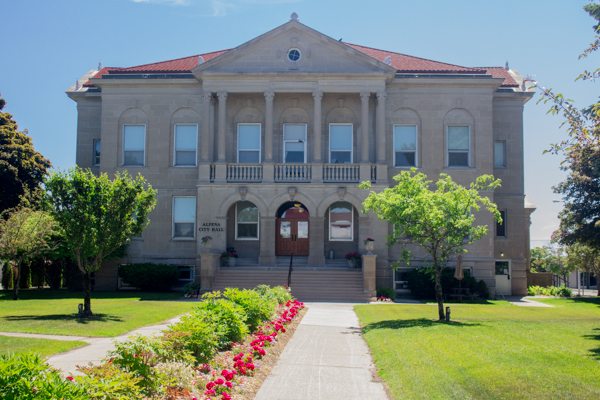
Alpena City Hall

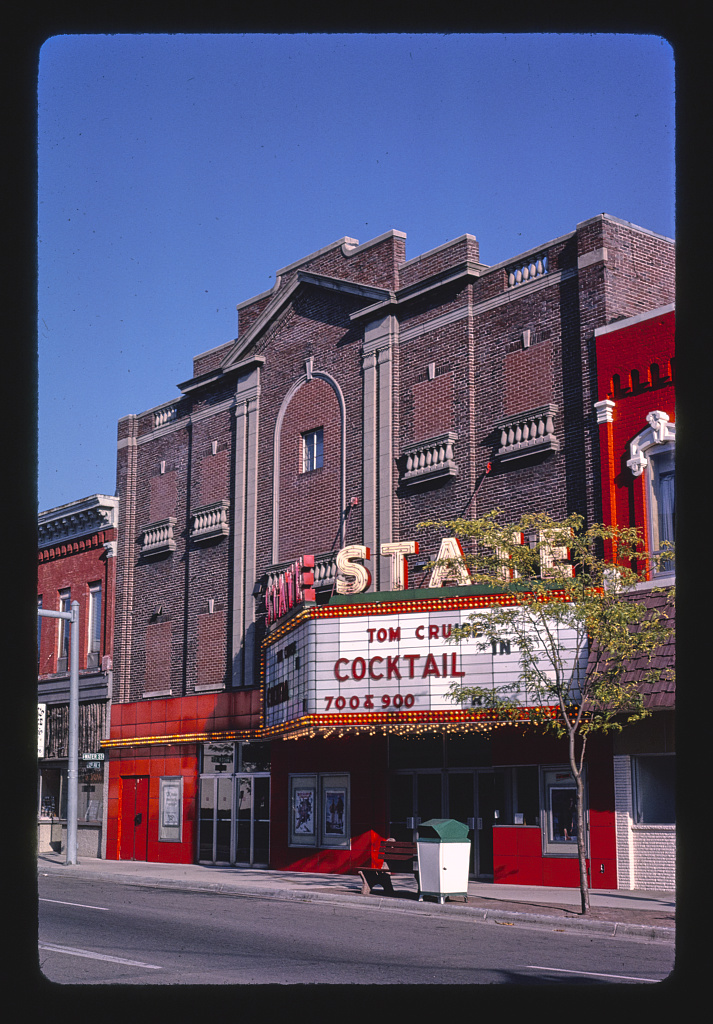
State Theater / Maltz Opera Block

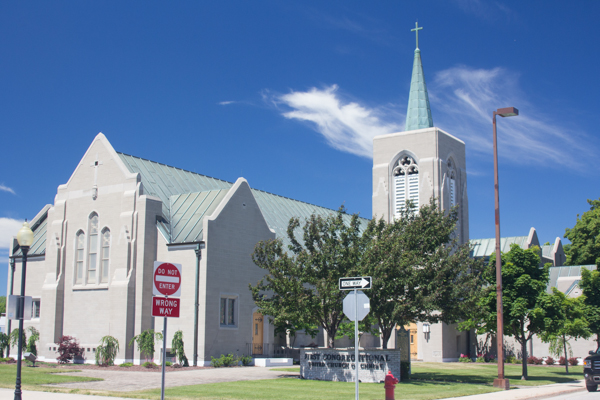
First Congregational Church

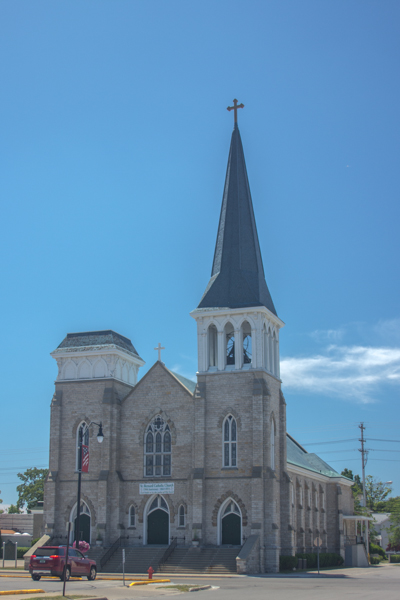
Saint Bernard Catholic Church

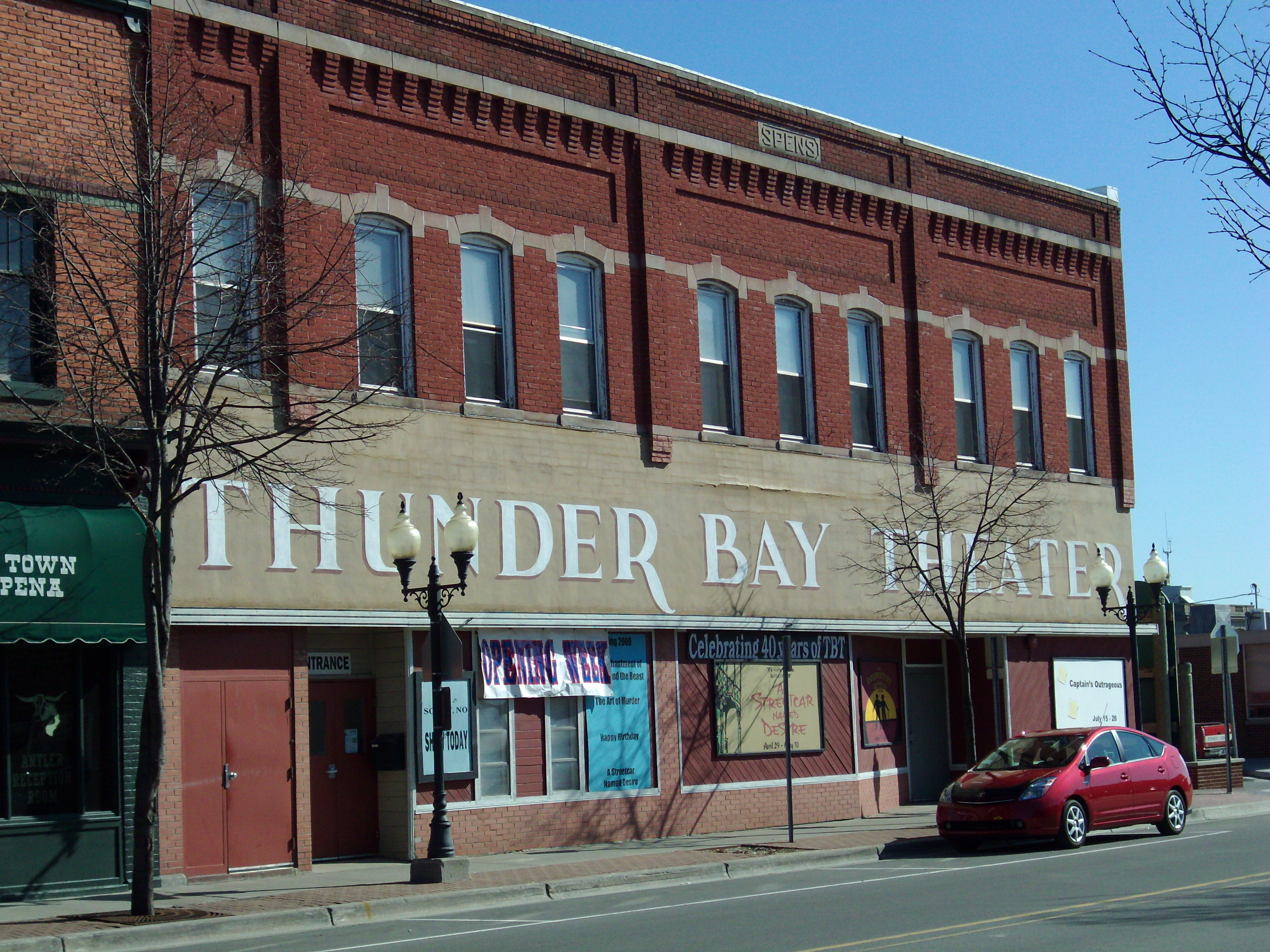
Spens Block / Thunder Bay Theater
