= Hickory Corners Masonic Temple =

- Hickory Lodge No. 345
- U.S. National Register of Historic Places
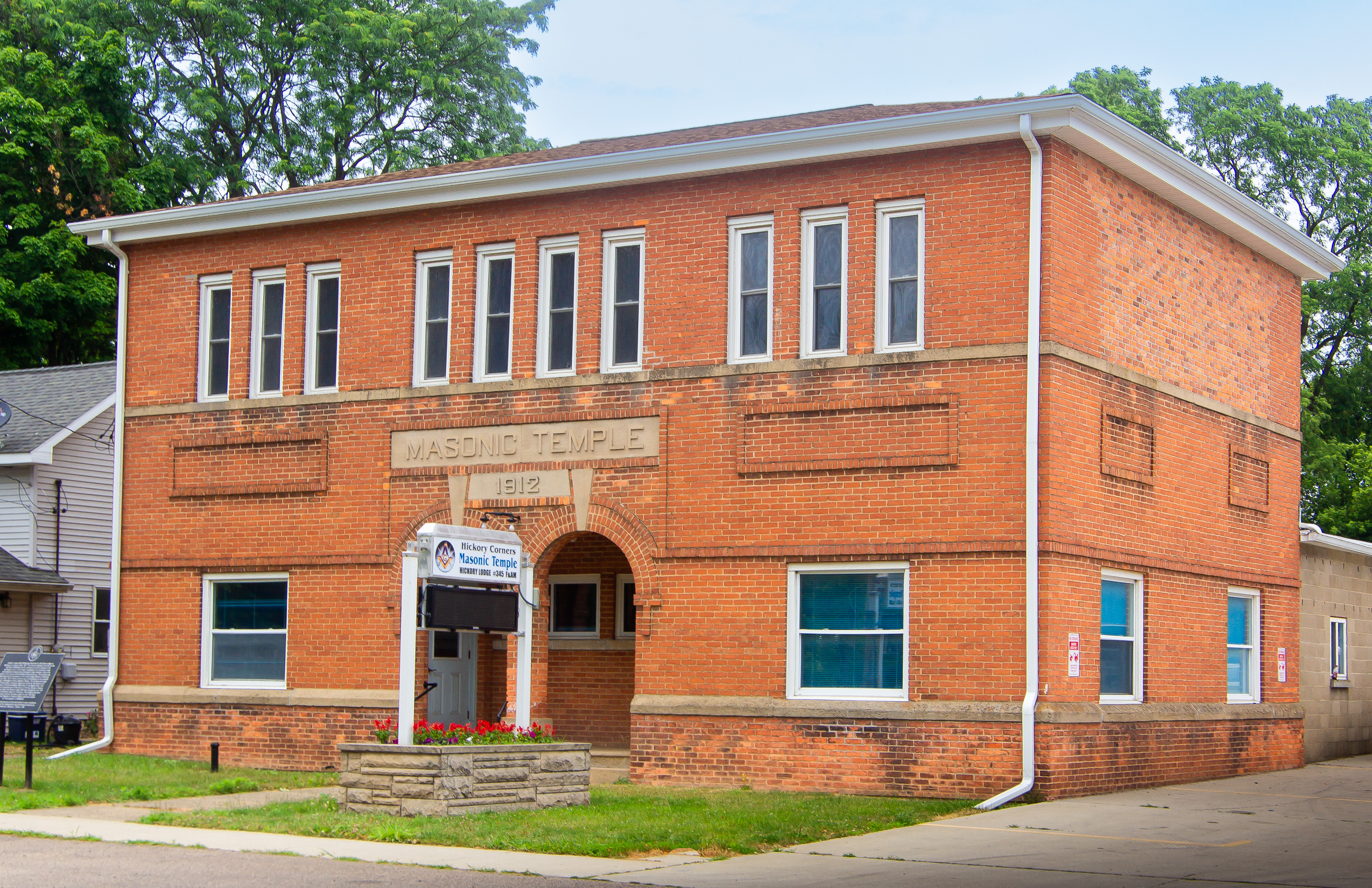
- Hickory Lodge No. 345
- Interactive map
- Location: 4558 West Hickory Rd., Hickory Corners, Michigan
- Coordinates: 42°26′30″N 85°22′36″W
- Built: 1912
- Architect: Rockwell LeRoy
- NRHP reference No.: 100006410
- Added to NRHP: April 20, 2021

Hickory Corners Masonic Temple, also known as Hickory Lodge No. 345 is a Masonic Temple located at 4558 West Hickory Road in Hickory Corners, Michigan. The building was listed on the National Register of Historic Places in 2021.

== History ==
Hickory Corners was first settled in 134, and by 1875 had grown to a small village of 100 people. In 1877, Masonic Lodge 345 was chartered in the village. The Lodge met in various buildings in the community until 1911, when they began exploring the idea of constructing their own building. In December 1911, the Masons purchased a lot and commissioned Kalamazoo, Michigan, architect Rockwell A. LeRoy to design a building. They approved the plans and began construction in the spring of 1912. Most of the construction was performed by Lodge members, and the building was completed and formally opened in July 1913. Since that time, the Masons have offered the building for the use of other organizations, and Lodge No. 345 has continuously used the building. An addition was constructed in the 1960s, and the roof was rebuilt in 2013.

== Description ==
The Hickory Corners Masonic Temple is a two-story, rectangular red brick building sitting on a concrete foundation. The original flat roof has been replaced with a low hipped roof. The building consists of the original 1912 structure measuring twenty-six feet by fifty-two feet, and a small, single-story concrete block addition containing a kitchen. The front façade is three bays wide, with the center bay containing a double arched entry. A second-story window is above, and stone steps lead to the entryway. The side bays are nearly symmetrical, and each contain a single first floor window opening and three narrow windows at the second floor, separated by a brick relief panel.
