= Thunder Lake II Site =

Archaeological site in Michigan, United States

- U.S. National Register of Historic Places
- Location within Michigan Location within the United States
- Location: near Thunder Lake, Schoolcraft County, Michigan
- Coordinates: 46°6′0″N 86°28′30″W
- MPS: Woodland Period Archaeological Sites of the Indian River and Fishdam River Basins MPS
- NRHP reference No.: 14000372
- Added to NRHP: June 27, 2014

The Thunder Lake II Site, also designated 20ST109, is an archaeological site located near Thunder Lake in Schoolcraft County, Michigan. The site dates from the Woodland period. It was listed on the National Register of Historic Places in 2014.
