= Hotel Nichols =

Hotel in South Haven, Michigan, US

- Nichols Hotel
- U.S. National Register of Historic Places
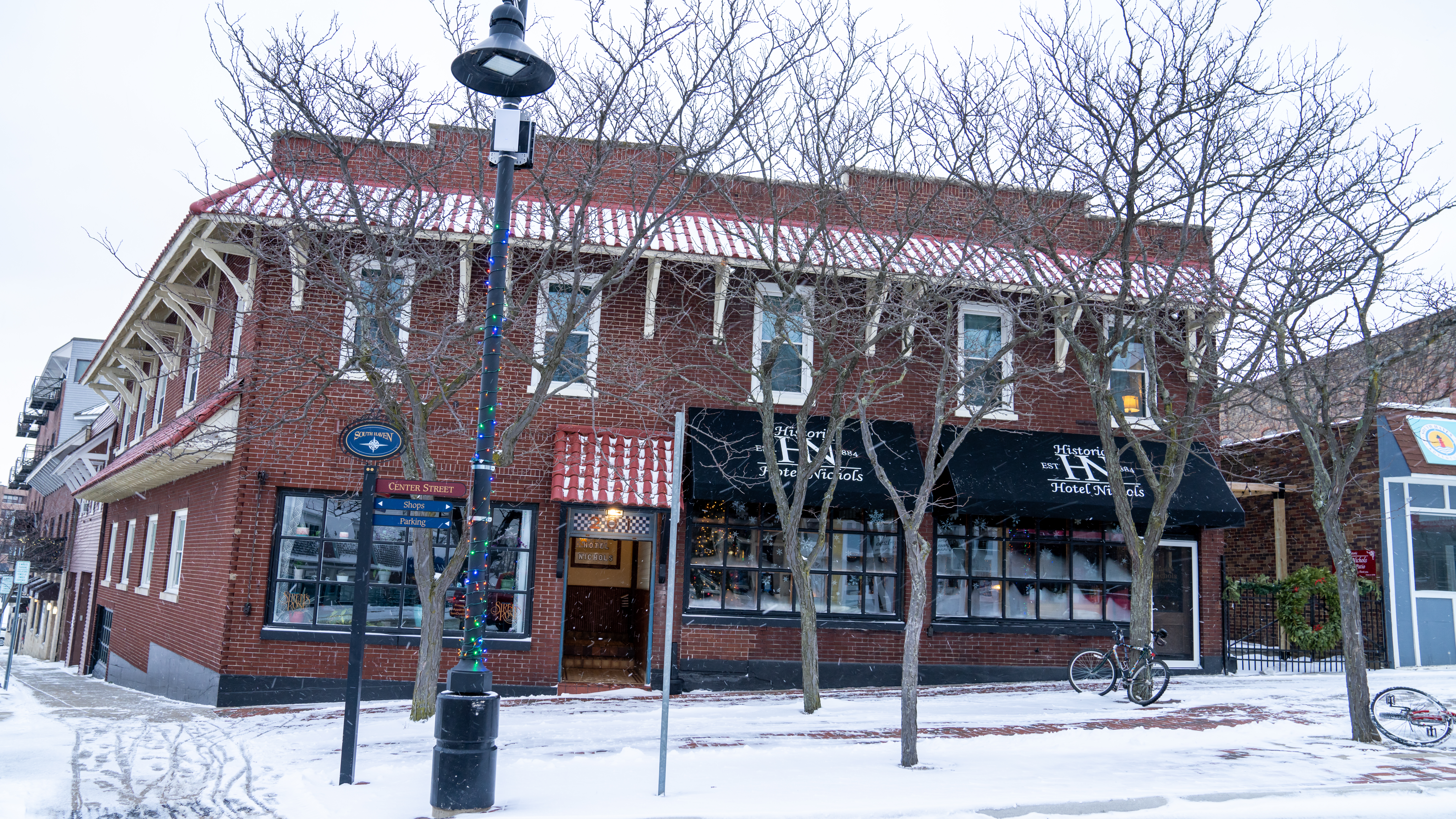
- Hotel Nichols on Christmas Day 2020

- Location within Michigan Location within the United States
- Interactive map
- Location: 201 Center St., South Haven, Michigan
- Coordinates: 42°24′17″N 86°16′26″W
- Built: 1884
- Architectural style: Commercial brick
- NRHP reference No.: 100011633
- Added to NRHP: April 7, 2025

The Hotel Nichols is a brick hotel in South Haven, Michigan, with two stories comprising 17 rooms and 2 suites. The hotel is family-owned and operated on the corner of Center and Williams Streets downtown. The hotel first opened for business in 1884.

== History ==
The Hotel Nichols is the only historic hotel still in downtown South Haven. The hotel has been run as a family business for over 100 years.

The hotel was opened in 1884 as the Webster's Hotel after the first owner E.C. Webster. In 1944, the Webster family sold the hotel to Donald and Elizabeth Nichols who changed the name to the Nichols Hotel. In 2002, the hotel changed ownership again in 2002 when Anna Rajer bought it. The hotel was run by Ratjer and her daughter Joanna until it was sold to the current owners Scott and Kary Whiteford in 2017.

=== 1884–1944 ===
E.C. Webster opened the hotel and was run as a family business until it was sold in 1944.

From 1906 to 1944, a café was operated on the lower level of the hotel. E. C. Webster and his son Hollis Webster established Holly's Fountain Lunch in the lobby of the hotel in 1925. Ward Webster bought out his father's interest in the cafe, and moved to the location. This allowed Ward Webster to start a chain of restaurants called Holly's. After the chain expanded they had locations in most of the major cities. They company they founded was Holly's Inc., which owned 23 restaurants and six Holiday Inns. The chain had sales in 1982 of about $24 million (equivalent to $65.8 million in 2024). The chain had locations in 1981 in South Haven, St. Joseph, Grand Rapids, and other major cities, including three locations in Indiana.

The names of the locations vary including Holly's Landing, Holly's Bistro, Ristorante Holly's and Holly's Steak. The first location out of South Haven was opened in St. Joseph in 1939 when they opened Holly's Grill.

=== 1944–2025 ===
The Webster family sold the hotel to Donald and Elizabeth Nichols, who operated the hotel for almost 60 years. During that time the hotel suffered a fire.

In July 1951 the hotel suffered a fire which started in a refrigerator in the hotel kitchen. The kitchen was the only room impacted causing about $8,000 (equivalent to $77,000 in 2024) in damages. At the time of the fire 25 guests were in the hotel, and they were led out by firefighters. Only one person was injured during the evacuation after being lowered down by rope.

In 2025, the hotel was added to the National Register of Historic Places.

== Description ==
The Hotel Nichols is constructed from three interconnected older buildings: 201 Center Street (originally a one-story building), 203 Center Street (originally a two-story building that housed the original hotel), and 508 Williams Street (originally an automobile service garage). The walls are constructed of dark red brick. A decorative skirt roof supported by wooden brackets is located above the second floor windows; below the windows is a smaller skirt roof of similar design.
