= Whitecaps =

Whitecap(s) or White Cap(s) may refer to:

- Whitecap, a water wave with a foam crest

== Arts and entertainment ==
- "Whitecaps" (The Sopranos), a 2002 TV episode
- "Whitecaps", a 2019 song by George Watsky
- "Whitecaps", a 2014 song by Prince from Plectrumelectrum

== Mountains ==
- Whitecap Mountain (British Columbia), Canada
- White Cap Mountain (Franklin County, Maine), U.S.
- White Cap Mountain (Piscataquis County, Maine), U.S.
- Whitecap Mountains, a ski resort in Anderson, Wisconsin, U.S.
- White Cap Peak, Custer County, Idaho, U.S.

== Political and armed movements ==
- Indiana White Caps, a late-19th-century American vigilante organization
- Las Gorras Blancas, a 19th-century American Southwest group who fought against squatters
- Whitecapping, a violent vigilante movement in late 19th to early 20th century America, mostly in the South

== Sports ==
- Brewster Whitecaps, an American summer collegiate amateur baseball team
- Minnesota Whitecaps, an American women's ice hockey team
- Tampa Bay Whitecaps, a proposed name for the Tampa Bay Rays, an American major league baseball team
- Vancouver Whitecaps (disambiguation), several current and former Canadian soccer clubs
- West Michigan Whitecaps, an American minor league baseball team
- White Caps Turnhout, an ice hockey team in Turnhout, Belgium
- The referee, or head official on a gridiron football crew, who wears a white cap to identify them.

== Other uses ==
- Whitecap Dakota First Nation, Saskatchewan, Canada
- Whitecap Resources, a Canadian public oil company based in Calgary, Alberta
- White Cap Marine Towing and Salvage, New York City, U.S.
- White Cap, Sioux chief and member of the Exovedate of the 1885 Provisional Government of Saskatchewan, Canada
