= Iron Mountain Central Historic District =

Historic district in Michigan, United States

- U.S. National Register of Historic Places
- U.S. Historic district
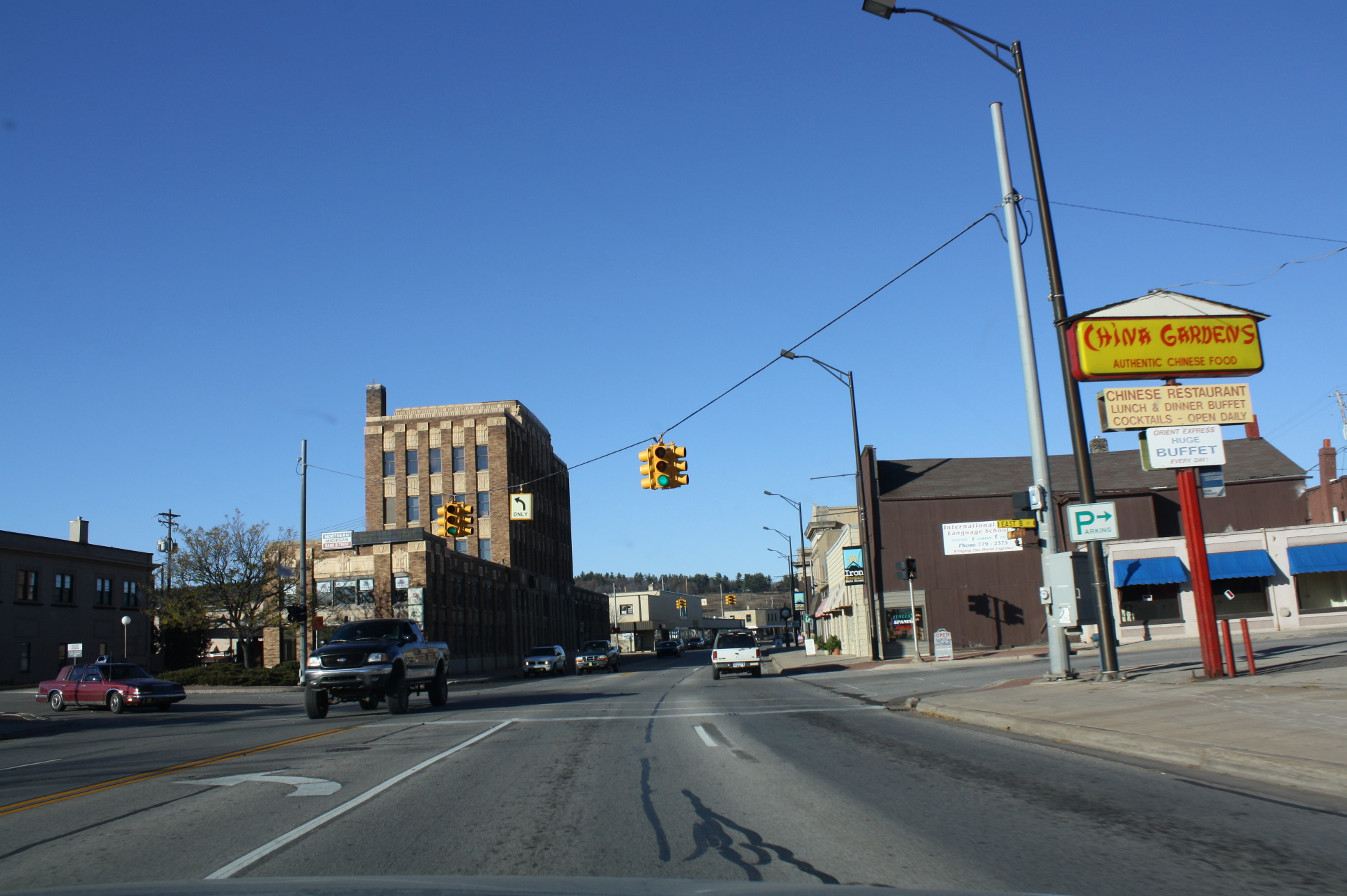
- Stephenson Avenue (US2) at C Street

- Location within Michigan Location within the United States
- Interactive map
- Location: Broadly, Fleshiem to C St. & Iron Mountain to Stockbridge Ave., Iron Mountain, Michigan
- Coordinates: 45°49′10″N 88°4′1″W
- Architectural style: Late Victorian, Neoclassical, Art Deco, Commercial Brick, Mid-century modern
- NRHP reference No.: 13000763
- Added to NRHP: September 25, 2013

The Iron Mountain Central Historic District is a historic district, broadly located between Fleshiem and C Streets and between Iron Mountain and Stockbridge Avenues in Iron Mountain, Michigan. The district covers the city's central business district and adjacent areas. It is primarily commercial, but also contains the historic county courthouse complex, and school, library, and church buildings. It was listed on the National Register of Historic Places in 2013.

== History ==
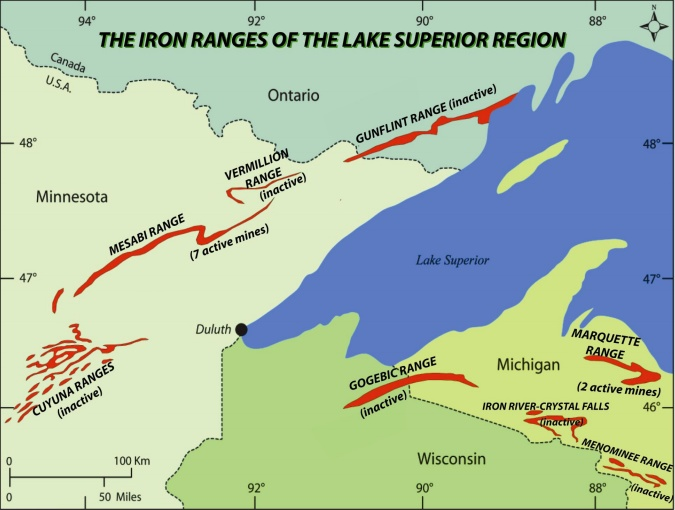
Lake Superior Iron Ranges

A major iron ore deposit was discovered near what is now Iron Mountain in 1878/79; the first ore from the first area mine (the Chapin Mine) was produced in late 1879. Iron Mountain was first platted in December 1879 by Samuel M. and Isaac Stephenson and Joseph Flesheim; their platting encompassed what is now the northeast portion of the Central Historic District. Numerous other mines opened in the area, and workers began flooding in. Buildings appeared in Iron Mountain almost overnight, and in 1881 the Stephensons and Joseph Flesheim executed a second plat, extending the original one to the west. In 1882 they made a second addition, and other businessmen added plats so that by late 1883, the entirety of what is now the Central Historic District had been platted.

During the decade that followed, the population of Iron Mountain soared, to over 5000 in 1888 and over 8500 in 1890. Following the population boom, wooden commercial buildings sprang up along Stephenson Street, beginning at Fleishem and continuing south to C Street. Following a string of fires, in 1889 an ordinance was enacted to mandate masonry commercial buildings. A number of buildings were constructed in the late 1880s and early 1890s, including four large masonry structures in 1891.

As the 20th century turned, the population boom of the late 19th century had plateaued. The Panic of 1893 precipitated an industrial slowdown and a surge of unemployment in the local mines. Although the local economy recovered, the 1900 population was just over 9000, only a few hundred more than in 1890. The subsequent gradual decline of mining in the early twentieth century, with few new industries in the area to take its place, heralded a slow decline in population; by 1920 Iron Mountain again had a little more than 8500 people. Mirroring the general economic health of the city, only a few new buildings were constructed from 1900 to 1920.

With the onset of the 1920s, the local economy again boomed. Ford Motor Company constructed a sawmill and body plant in 1921–22, which employed 2200 people in 1923 and over 7000 in 1925. In addition, the surge in national automotive traffic and improvements in roads boosted the local tourism economy. By 1924, an additional 5000 people had moved into Iron Mountain. The boom in population again heralded a boom in construction in the downtown commercial district.

With the onset of the Great Depression, the economic fortunes of the area plummeted. In 1933, it was estimated that 85% of the local workforce was unemployed. While the economy slowly improved from this nadir, very few building projects were undertaken in the 1930s. After World War II, the economy again improved, despite the closing of the Ford plant in 1951 and the continuous decline in population of the city. A number of construction and renovation projects were undertaken in the two decades following the war.

As the district entered the latter years of the 20th century, it encountered a number of challenges, including new commercial development that occurred outside of the downtown area and several fires that destroyed buildings within the district. Nonetheless, the city has strongly supported the downtown area, including support for preservation and rehabilitation of the district's historic building stock.

== Description ==
The Iron Mountain Central Historic District encompasses Iron Mountain's downtown, along and adjacent to Stephenson Avenue (US-2), the main commercial street through the city. The district is irregularly shaped, covering the city's central business district and also extending to adjacent areas containing the historic county courthouse complex, and school, library, and church buildings. The district contains a total of 144 buildings, primarily dating from the early 1880s to the mid-1960s, but also including twelve newer structures.

Most of the buildings within the district have contained commercial establishments. As the district was the main business section of Iron Mountain for over a century, the business in it have varied across a wide spectrum. In the late 19th century, as the city was first built, the business district's buildings contained general stores, grocery and dry-goods stores, clothing and shoe stores, millineries, fruit and confectionery stores, jewelers, drug stores, hardware and lumber stores, furniture stores, butchers, bakeries, and blacksmiths. Businesses also included undertakers, livery stables, banks, barber shops, photographers, hotels, restaurants, saloons, and billiard parlors. in the early 20th century, different types of stores emerged, including department stores, book and stationery stores, sporting goods stores, paint and decorating stores, carpet stores, appliance stores, plumbing and heating businesses, laundries, auto garages and dealerships, gas stations, auto parts stores, movie houses, bowling alleys, and dance halls.

Many of the buildings in the area housed fraternal and service organizations on the upper floors, including the Masonic Temple, Odd Fellows, Knights of Pythias, Ancient Order of United Workmen, Sons of St. George, Improved Order of Red Men, Scandinavian Aid and Fellowship Society, Knights of the Modern Maccabees, the Grand Army of the Republic (GAR), Ste. Jean Baptiste Society, Catholic Order of Foresters, Society Fraterlante, the National Protective League, and the Benevolent Protective Order of Elk. In addition to commercial establishments, the district also housed government buildings, including the county courthouse, city hall, and post office. Educational establishments in the district include the public junior high and high school, a Catholic school, and the public library (now a museum). The district also contains six churches and some single-family houses.

Older residential neighborhoods adjoin the district on the east, southeast, west, and southwest. A large tract of nearly vacant land, which once contained the Chapin Mine and related structures, abuts the district to the north.

Some of the most significant structures located within the Iron Mountain Central Historic District are listed below in the order of construction.

=== Unnamed store (535-537 Stephenson) ===
This unnamed store, constructed c. 1883 for Richard Williams, is probably the oldest extant commercial building in Iron Mountain's downtown district. The earliest recorded use of the building was as a meat market; later it was used as a fruit and confectionery shop and a grocery. A narrow corner storefront addition (537) was built some time in the 1920s. The original building is a two-story false front gable-roof wooden building. It is now faced with modern siding. The 1920s addition is a single-story brick commercial building. In 2018, the south wall of the original building was painted with a mural that welcomes people into downtown Iron Mountain through the Power of Words Project. The mural features the Cornish Pump, Pine Mountain Ski Jump, and other local features.

=== German Hotel (407 Merritt) ===
The German Hotel was constructed at some time between 1884 and 1888, probably for John Marsch and Fred Gothe. It housed a saloon and hotel; and was certainly run by Marsch and Gothe by 1892. In 1920, they sold the hotel to Anton Lovrich, who changed the name to the American Hotel and ran it until at least 1949. The hotel is a two-story wooden structure, now clad in diagonal wood siding on the first floor and narrow vinyl siding on the second. The front entry is edged with 1950s-looking random ashlar masonry, and the windows are modern; however, the basic shape of the building is still original.

=== John Russell Building (100 E. Brown) ===
This building was constructed at some time between 1884 and 1888, and is first identified as a general store. In 1892, the store is identified as John Russell's general store. For some time, the upstairs was used by the Masonic Temple, and then in 1910 was used by R. F. Dundon's Actual Business College. Russell retired in 1924 and leased the first floor storefront to the Chalmers & Burns Confectionery, who occupied the space until 1937. In 1938, I. Zacks & Co. (Isadore Zacks and sons Max and Maurice), meat and fruit wholesalers, renovated and moved in. The rear addition was probably constructed at this time. In 1952, Zacks sold the building to Mose Cohodes & Son, a meat wholesaler, who used it until the 1980s.

The John Russell Building is a deep 2-story brick building, now with two small horizontal windows in the front below what seems to be the original storefront frieze. There are two widely separated square-head windows in the second story. Two more modern additions are located to the side and rear.

=== First Presbyterian Church (200 W. Brown) ===
The Presbyterian Church in Iron Mountain was established in 1884, and this building was constructed for the congregation by early 1886 for about $3000. The congregation occupied this building until 1958, when they moved to a new church in Kingsford. It was then used as a welfare workshop, and as the Pine Mountain Baptist Chapel/Church. In 2000, it was purchased by Francie's Traditional Designs. On October 22, 2013, the building was severely damaged in a fire and was subsequently torn down. The area remains a vacant lot to this day.

The First Presbyterian Church is a wooden Late Victorian/Stick style structure with a cross-gable roof, a red sandstone foundation, and a pyramid-roof square tower with an open belfry. The clapboard exterior is subdivided vertically by applied stickwork and horizontally by a broad band of vertical boarding. The gables have stick- and pierced-work ornamentation, and the An enclosed front entry porch has more stickwork trimming. The original windows are still in place. The interior has original pine board floor and dark narrow beaded ceiling board in the gabled auditorium ceiling.

=== Chicago & North Western passenger depot (310 Stephenson) ===
The Chicago & North Western railroad reached Iron Mountain in 1880, at which time a wooden passenger depot was constructed. This building, constructed in 1889, replaced the original passenger depot. It served as a passenger depot until the service was discontinued in about 1950. The railway sold the building in 1953, and in 1954 Bert Harvey's Sports Shop opened in the building. It has continued to house various commercial establishments.

The depot is a long, narrow, single-story building with walls faced with limestone on the lower portion and brick above. The roof has gable ends and overhangs substantially on each long side. A slant bay window projects from the midpoint of the side originally facing the tracks, with a large semi-octagonal dormer directly above.

=== Wood Sandstone Block (206-16 E. Ludington) ===
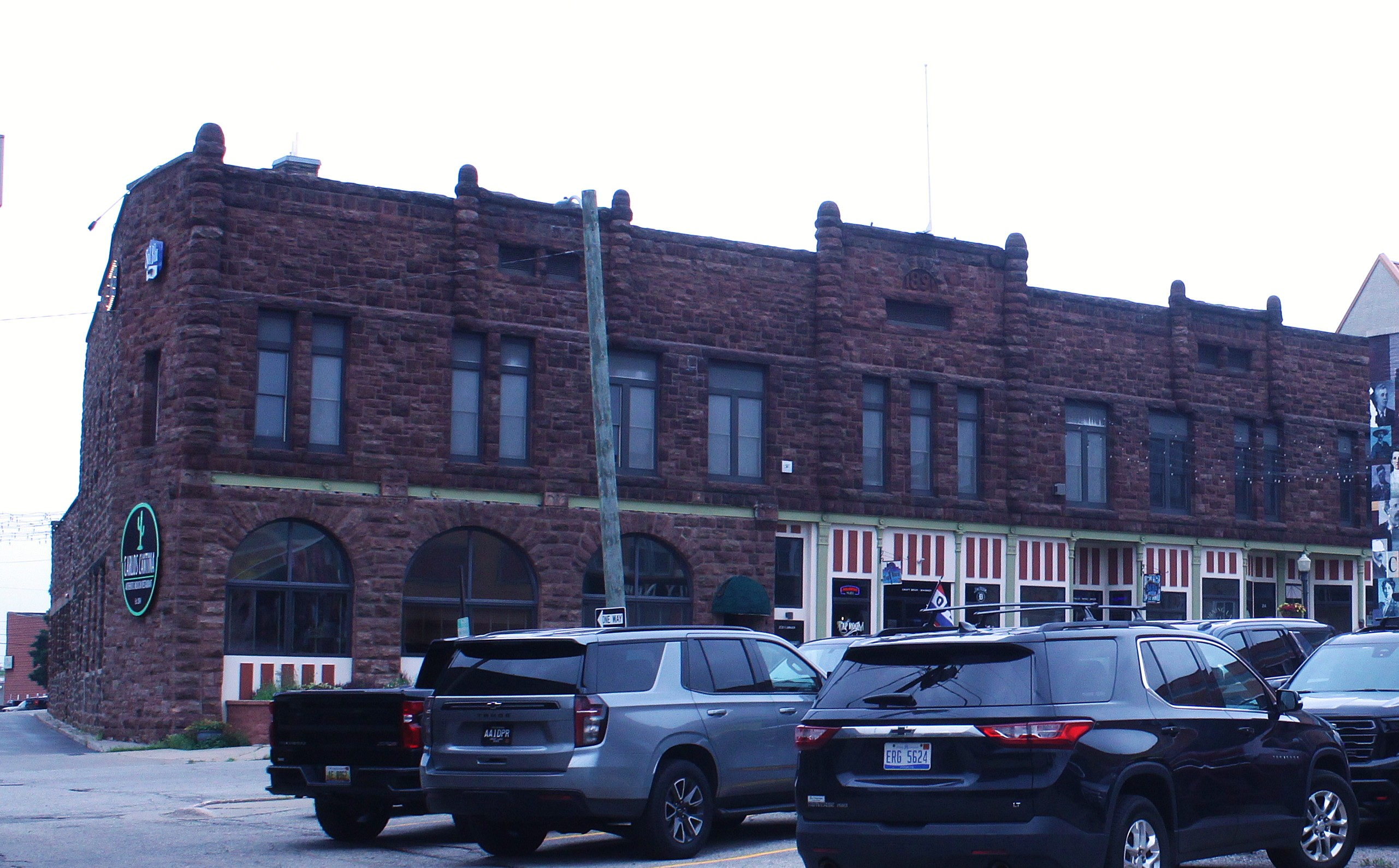
Wood Sandstone Block

The block was built in 1891 for John R. Wood, president of the First National Bank. It was called the "Sandstone" block to differentiate it from Wood's large brick block that contained the bank. The building initially contained six stores on the ground floor, and the Dickinson County government offices on the floor above. It was renovated into a hotel in 1896, then in 1900 the city government purchased the building and used it for their city hall offices until 1994. As of 2020 the ground floor housed commercial space, and in 2020 the second floor was renovated into apartments.

The Wood Sandstone Block is a massive two-story Richardsonian Romanesque structure with walls of brownish random ashlar and sandstone. It is 130 feet (40 m) long, and divided into seven sections by piers. Three broad arches at one end once contained fire engine bays; they are now filled with windows. Through the rest of the buildings, modern storefronts have decorative cast iron piers and columns that harmonize with the historic design of the building. The second story contains transomed square-head windows in pairs and triples.

=== Dickinson County Courthouse (705 Stephenson) ===
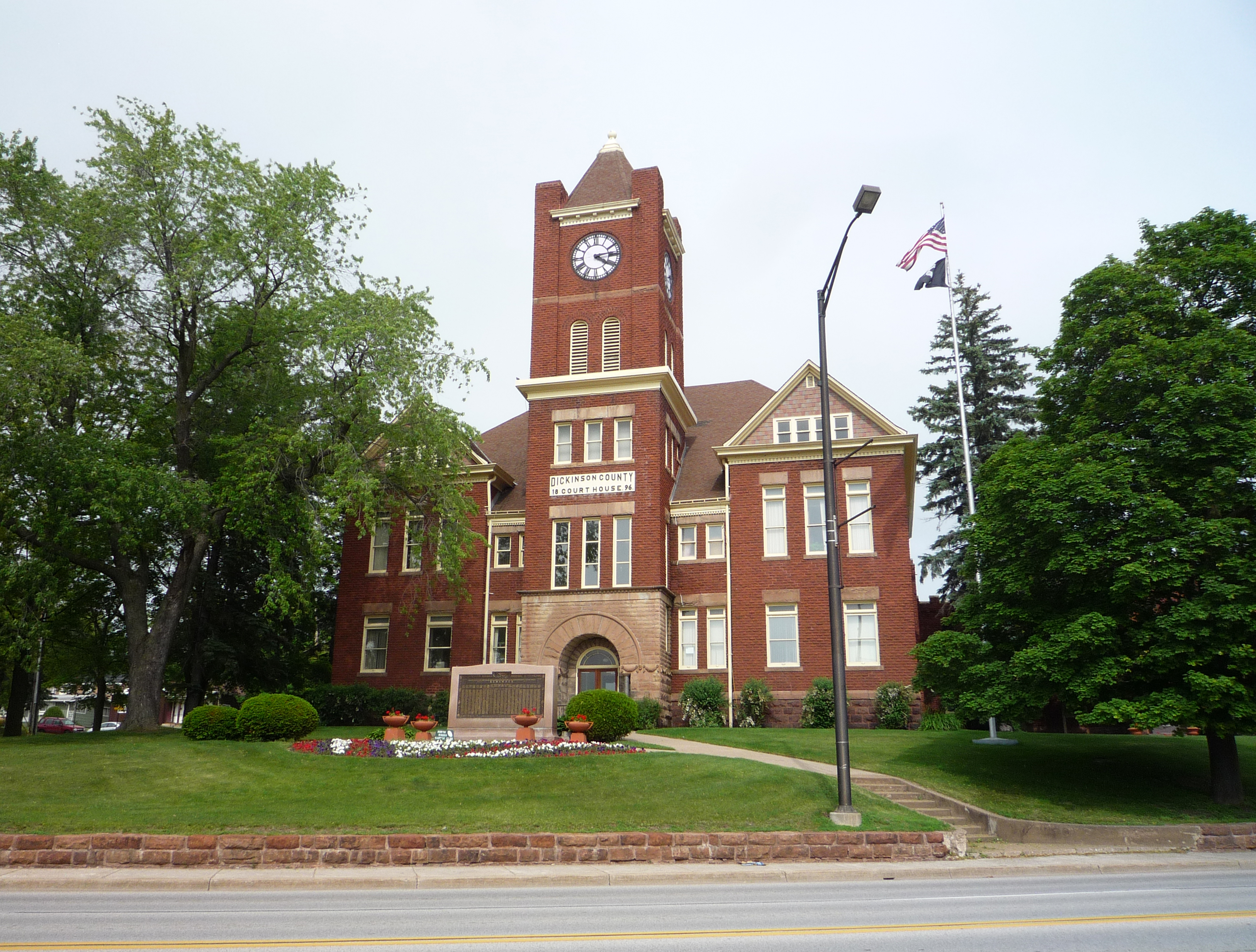
Dickinson County Courthouse

This courthouse and the associated jail was built in 1896 from plans by architect James E. Clancy of Antigo, Wisconsin, a former Iron Mountain resident. A new jail was constructed in 1985, and the old structure remained vacant and in disrepair until 1979. After renovations in 1982, county offices moved in. The courthouse is a 2 1/2-story Richardsonian Romanesque structure, built of red brick and Portage Entry sandstone. The front facade contains a rounded arch entryway, supported by two granite columns. The medieval-inspired jail was designed to complement the courthouse; it is a two-story structure built of red brick and sandstone, capped with stone battlemented parapets and a tin roof.

=== Public Library Building (300 Ludington) ===
The Carnegie Library as Menominee Range Historical Foundation Museum, 1988

In 1901, Andrew Carnegie donated $15,000 toward the construction of this library. It was constructed in 1901-02 from a design by J.E. Clancy, a locally prominent architect. It served as library until 1971, when it became the Menominee Range Museum. It was designated a Michigan State Historic Site in 1977. The building is a T-shaped Neoclassical structure with a hip roof, a raised uncut stone basement. and a stone facade. The second story porch has Ionic columns and a balustrade. The front lawn is bordered by a low retaining wall.

=== Bolognesi Building (114 E. Brown) ===
The Bolognesi Building was constructed between 1904 and 1908 for Joseph Bolognesi, who ran a saloon. Bolognesi ran a series of restaurants and bars at the property, including the Roma Restaurant, "Joseph Bolognesi's tavern," and the Milano Restaurant. The Bolognesi family lived upstairs. By 1959, the building contained Strong's Bar, owned by Jack S. Strong. That changed into Mayme's Bar, owned by Mrs. Mary F. Strong. By the late 1970s Robert J. Bouche and his wife Nancy M. Bouche (Mary Strong's daughter) owned the bar. The Bouche family still owns the bar. The Bolognesi Building is a two-story red brick store building with 5 square-head windows in the upstairs front and entirely finished with modern siding.

=== Swedish Methodist Episcopal Church (116 W. Brown) ===
This building was constructed in 1907/08 for the Swedish Methodist Episcopal Church, closely following a design in Benjamin D. and Max Charles Price's 1907 Church Plans. The church changed its name to Wesley M. E. Church in 1939, and in 1944 merged to form Trinity. The Trinity congregation used this church building until early 1954, when they moved to a new church on S. Carpenter. The Assembly of God Church used the building from 1954 through 1979. As of October 2023, the building remains vacant. The church is a dark red brick cross-gable structure with a square tower. The double-door entry is reached by a long stair and has a large Gothic window above.

=== High School (300 W. B Street) ===
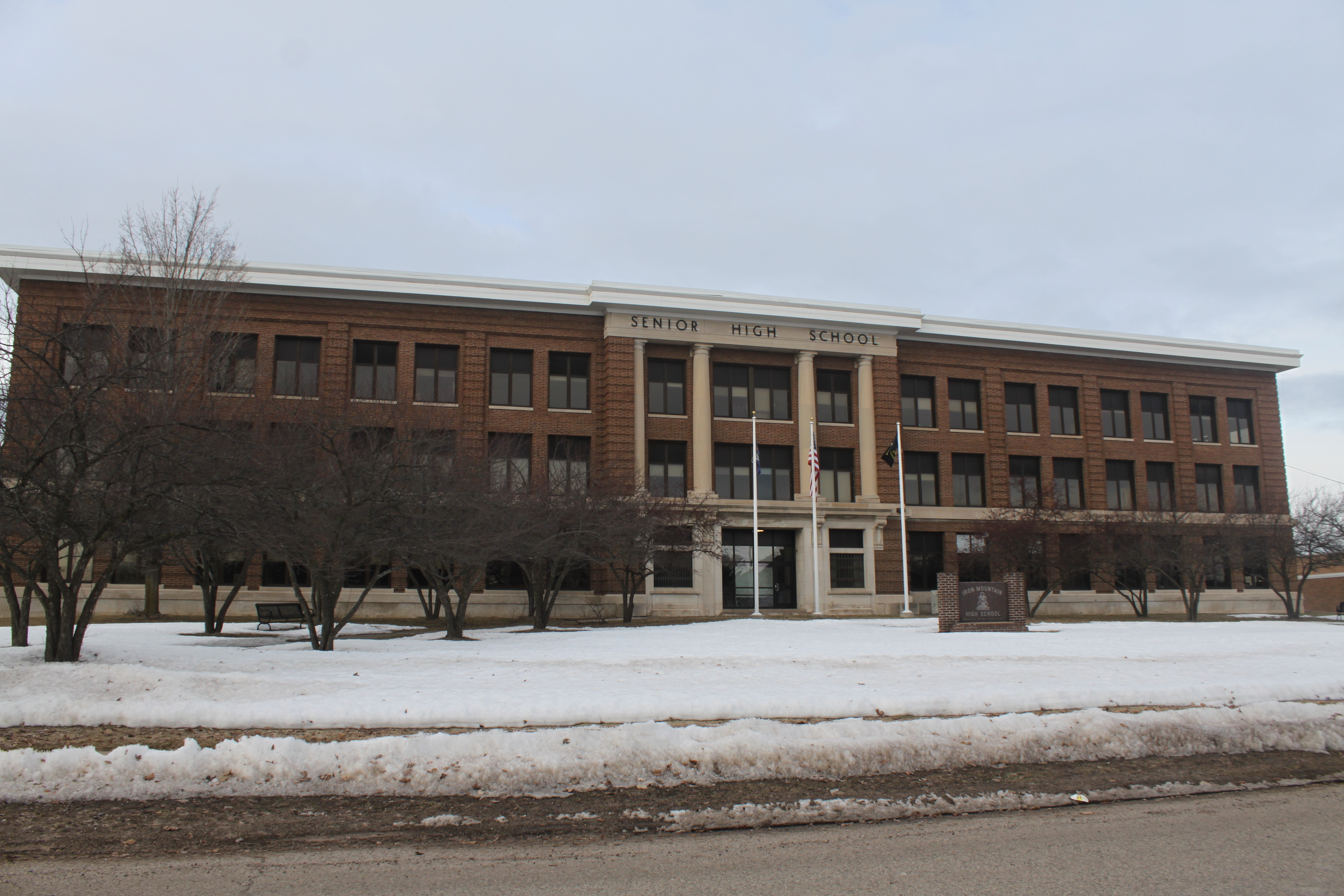
Iron Mountain High School

The Iron Mountain High School was constructed in 1911/12 after voters approved a $100,000 bond issue to finance a new building. It was designed by D. Fred Charlton of the Marquette architectural firm of Charlton & Kuenzli. It opened in 1912 and is still in use as the district high school. It is a three-story Neoclassical structure of red brick trimmed with limestone. The center section projects slightly and contains a portico with four Roman Doric columns. Each end has a paired column portico containing a center entrance.

=== Milwaukee Road Depot (101 E. B Street) ===
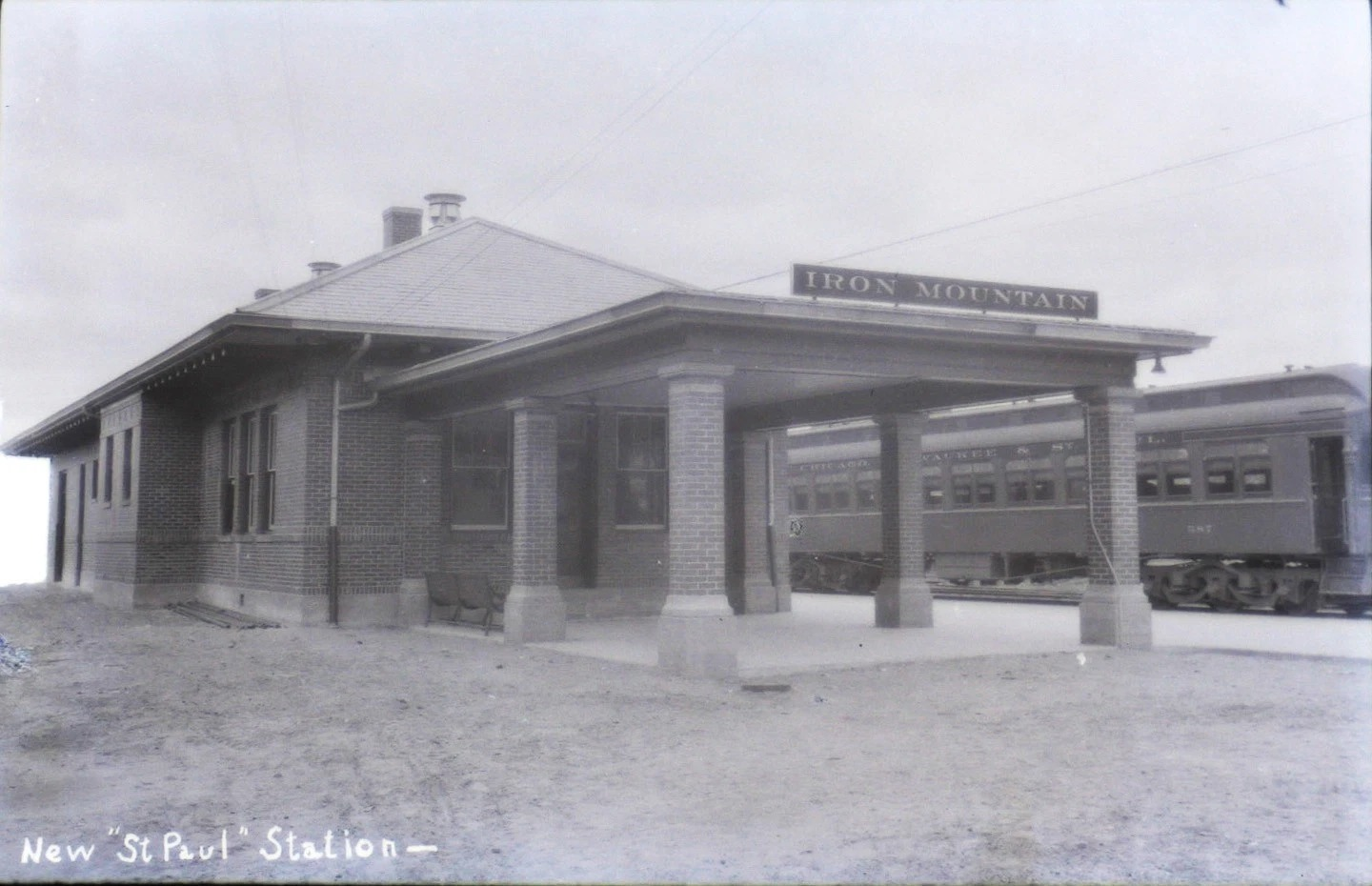
Milwaukee Road Depot in 1915

The Milwaukee & Northern Railroad was completed from Chicago to Iron Mountain in 1887. Passenger service was established in 1893, and a wooden passenger depot was constructed about that time. In 1912, this structure was constructed as a replacement passenger depot. It was in use for passengers and freight until 1968, and was used as a freight station by the Escanaba Lake Superior Railway until the early 1990s. The structure is currently vacant. The depot is a long, narrow single-story red brick structure of simple design with a hip roof that projects widely on all sides. A deep porte cochere/shelter supported by square columns is located on one end. Freight doors are at the end of each long side, and one side contains a bay window.

=== Northern Ballroom Building (100-102 W. Brown) ===
The Northern Ballroom was built in 1923 for George Jacksin and George Davich. The ground floor originally housed the Northern Garage; as of 1930 a Plymouth/Chrysler dealership. Jacksin and Davich managed the second floor ballroom. In 1927, F. E. Parmalee & Sons assumed management and changed the name to the Winter Garden. However, they soon defaulted on their loan, and the building went through a series of owners and tenants, including use as warehouse space by Montgomery Ward from about 1962 to 1977.

The building is a large two-story steel frame Commercial Brick commercial structure faced with red-brown wire-cut brick. The front facade consists of two parts, with broad piers separating the parts and at the building corners. The lower floor is now divided into several office and commercial spaces and retains few historic features. The second floor, with the Northern Ballroom, is still a large open space with the maple dance floor.

=== Braumart Theater Building (104-108 E. B Street) ===
The Braumart Theater was built in 1924/25 for the Colonial Theatre Company. An addition was constructed in 1925. The theater was remodeled in 1935, and again in 1988. It closed in 1996. As of 2012. it is used as the "Performing Arts Center on B Street." The building is a two-story buff brick structure with limestone trim. The main theater building has a 3-part symmetrical facade, and the later addition is a single storefront wide. There are paired and single windows on the second floor, and a tall attic containing arches filled with basketweave brickwork. The original theater sat 1000 people; the interior space was divided to install twin screens in the 1970s with a loss of nearly all the interior historical finish.

=== Wolfe Brothers Building (623-29 Stephenson) ===
Morris and Harry Wolfe of Chicago had this building constructed in 1927 as an income property. It is a single-story commercial brick building housing four storefronts, constructed of yellow buff brick with concrete trim. The bays are separated with vertical semi-octagonal piers.

=== Commercial Bank Building (500 Stephenson) ===
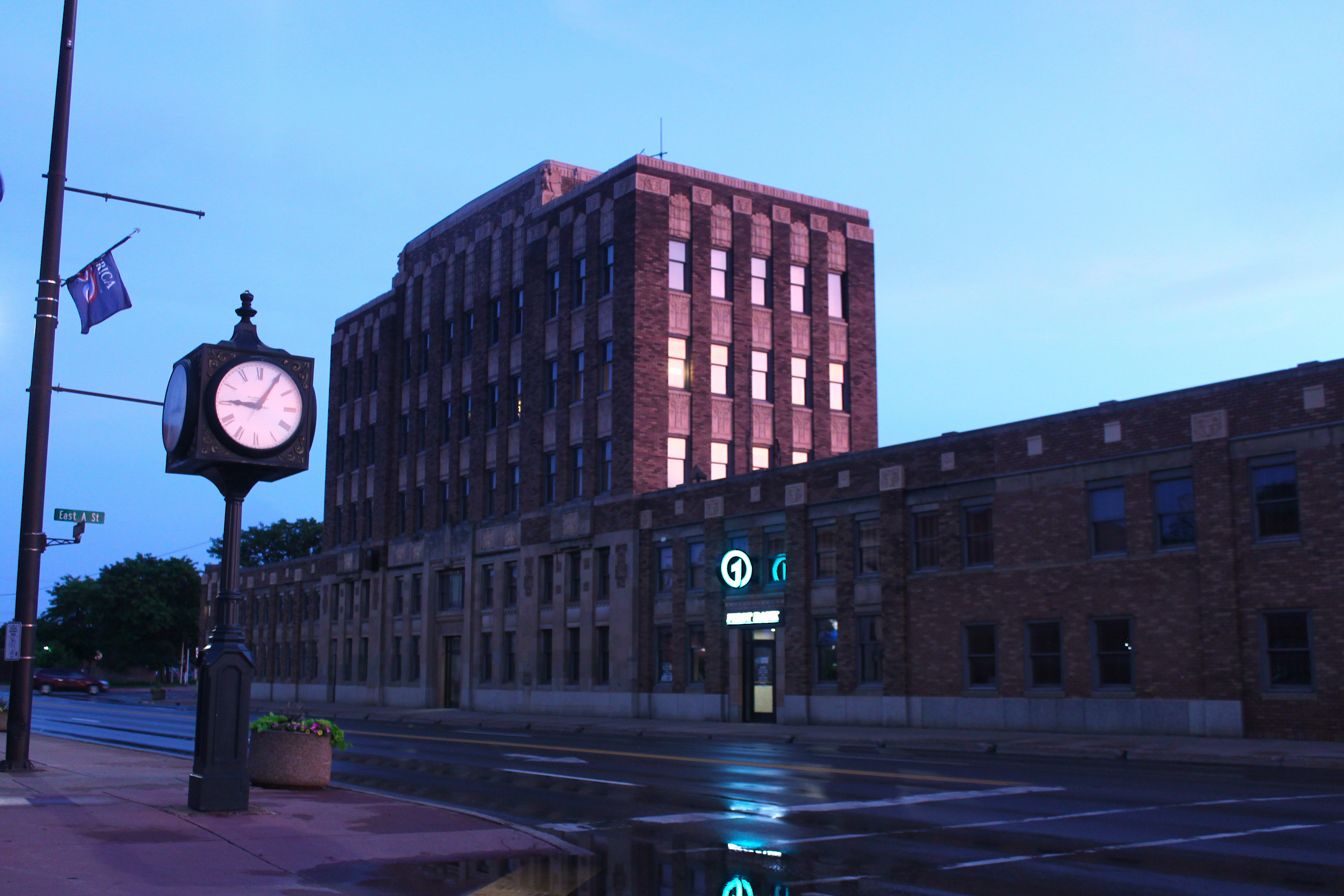
Commercial Bank Building

The Commercial Bank Building was constructed in 1929 for the Commercial Bank (later the Commercial National Bank), with commercial space on the first floor. A short addition was constructed in 1964–65. The space is occupied today by the Northern Michigan Bank & Trust. The Commercial Bank Building is a five-story Art Deco office building faced with multicolored brick with limestone and terra cotta trim. It has a two-story base running the length of the building (including the 1964/65 addition), with a five-story tower section rising in the center of the original 1929 structure. The terra cotta trim is lavish in its detailing, including ramshead plaques capping the piers, panels containing stylized plant forms, and large eagles at the corners of the tower's roofline.

=== St. Joseph Catholic Church (414 W. Prospect) ===
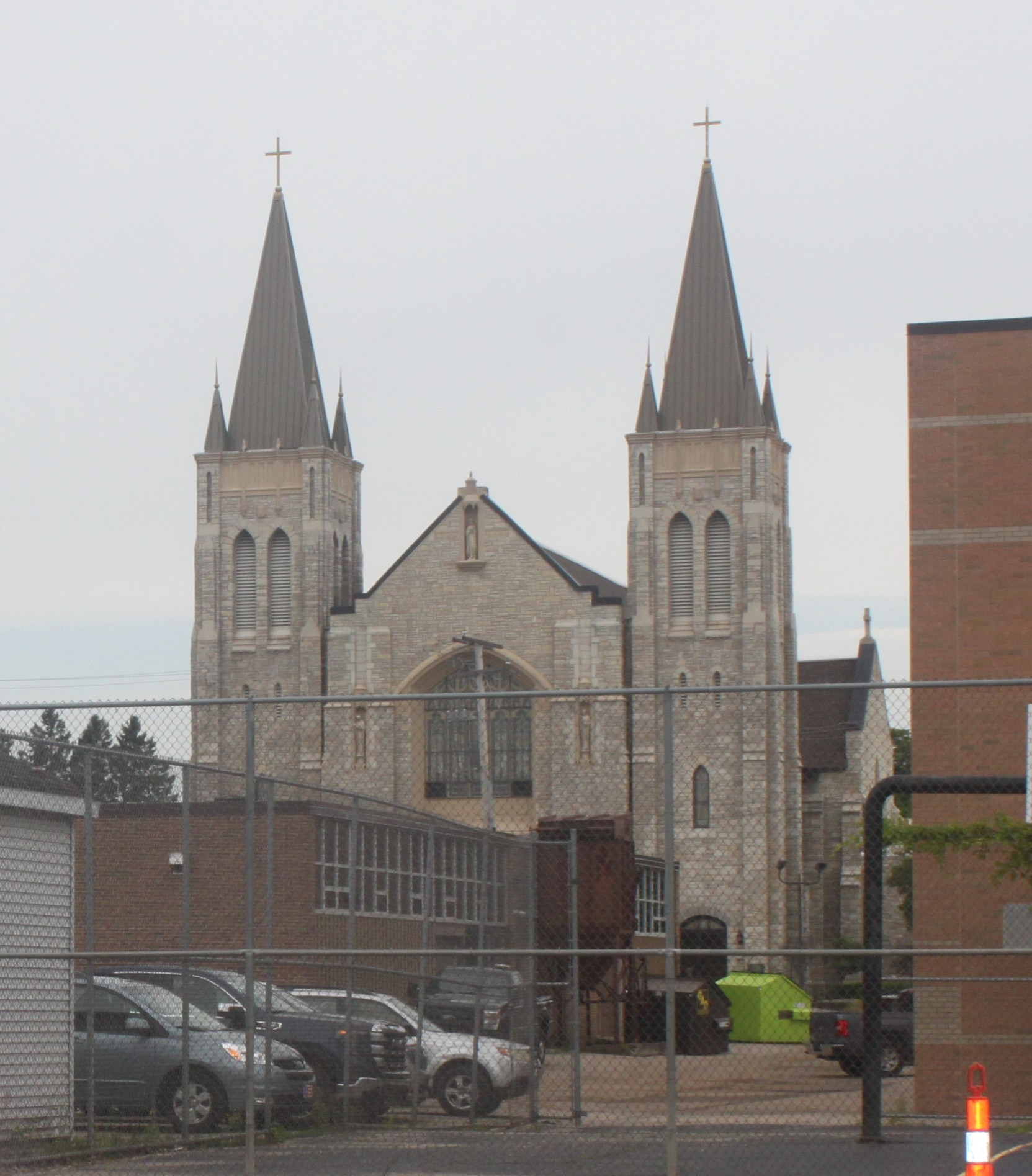
St. Mary and St. Joseph Catholic Church

The original St. Joseph Catholic Church was constructed in the 1890s. It was destroyed by fire in 1930, and this structure was built as a replacement in 1931–33. In 1942, the congregation merged with the nearby St. Mary parish, whose church had burned in 1938. The present church also suffered a devastating fire in 2003; most of the interior has been replaced. The structure is a large twin-towered Neo-Gothic church constructed of greyish white random ashlar. The front facade is symmetrical, with two square-plan buttressed towers flanking a deeply recessed center entrance below a narrow gable. The sides have large pointed-arch Gothic windows separated by large buttresses.

=== Junior High (301 W. Hughitt) ===
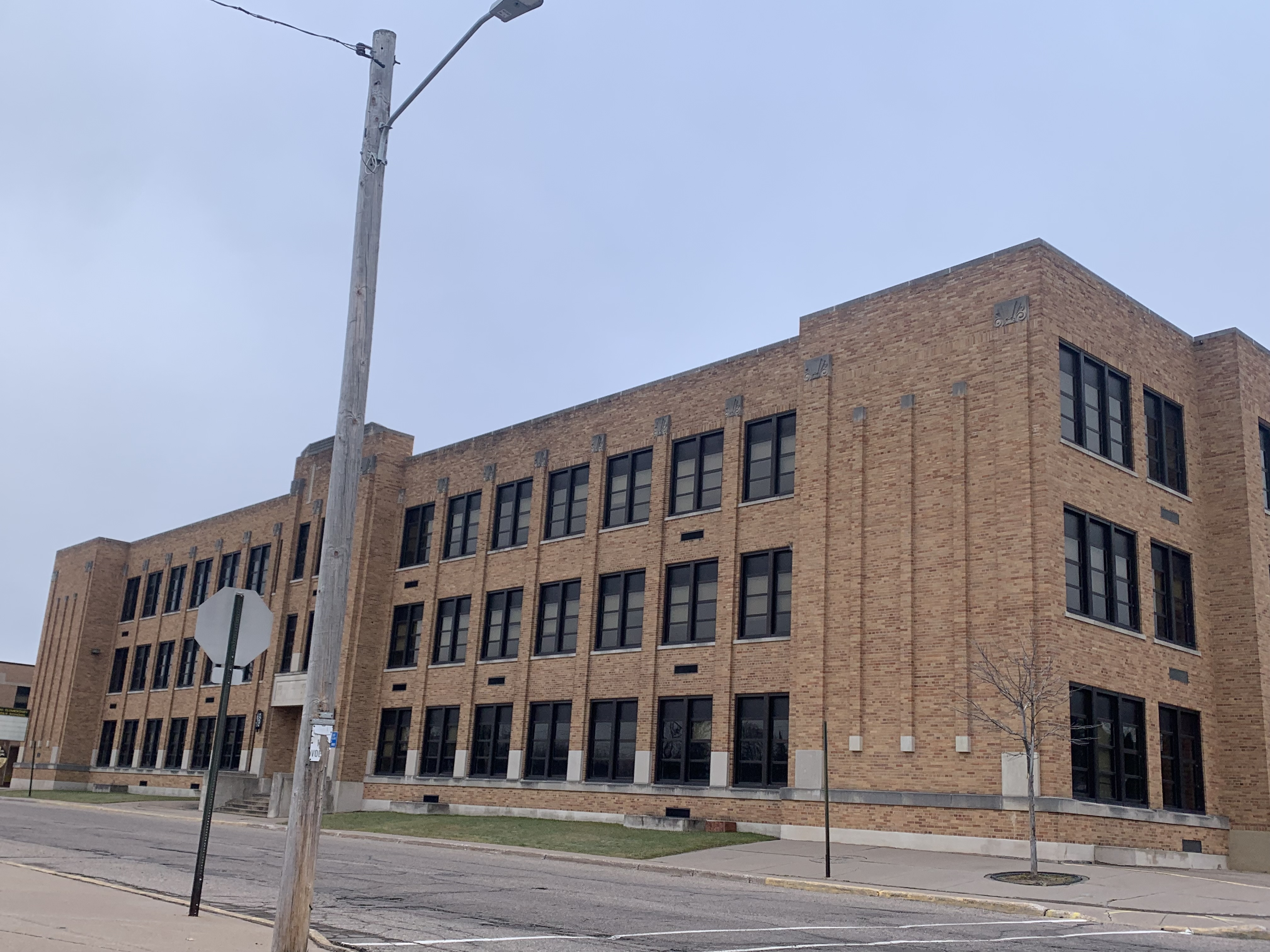
The Junior High School Building

The Iron Mountain Junior High School was constructed in 1938 from a design by local architects F. E. Parmalee & Son. It was built at the location of the earlier Central School, which was demolished in early 1938. The structure is a three-story light orange brick Art Deco building. It is constructed in a five-part form, with narrow projecting central and end sections connected by broader recessed sections. A broad central entrance flanked by piers is reached via a broad flight of steps. The central section contains three windows each on the second and third floors, while the narrow end sections contain no windows at all. The windows were originally double-hung six-over-six style, but are now two-over-two.

=== Holy Trinity Episcopal Church (221 W. B Street) ===
The original Holy Trinity Episcopal Church was an 1890 wooden Gothic building standing at this location. A fire badly damaged the building in 1950 and this new structure was built in 1952/53. The church is a Neo-Gothic structure of random ashlar over concrete block with a square tower and a steep gable-roof nave.

=== St. Mary and St. Joseph School (406 W. B Street) ===
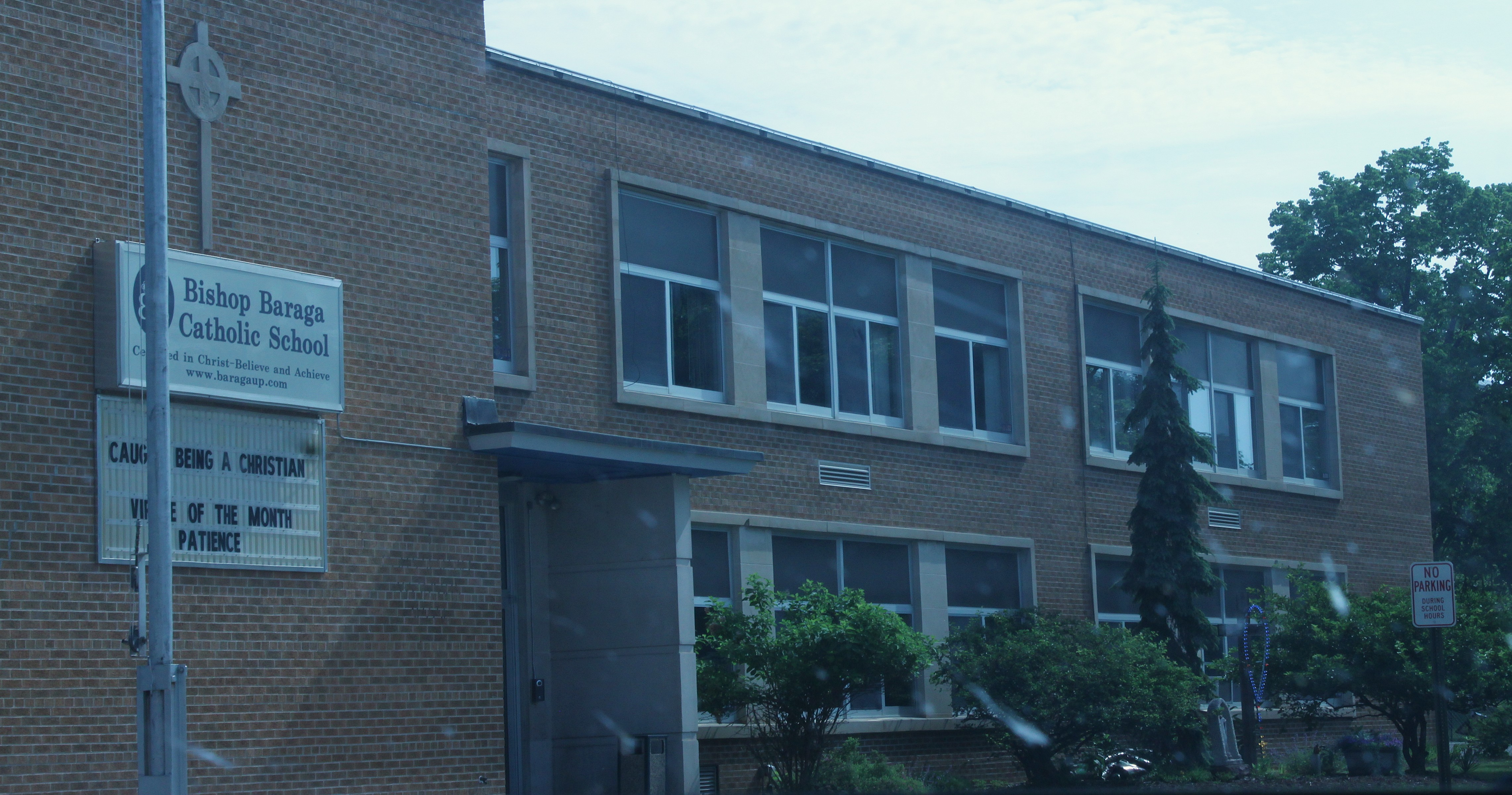
St. Mary and St. Joseph School (Bishop Baraga Catholic School)

The St. Mary and St. Joseph School was constructed in 1953–54; it is now the Bishop Baraga Catholic School. It is an L-shaped two-story International Style flat-roof school building, constructed of red brick with limestone trim. A flat metal canopy covers the entryway, and it contains large windows set in bands and outlined in limestone.

=== Iron Mountain Motel (700 Stephenson) ===
The Iron Mountain Motel was constructed in 1954–55 by contractors Oscar Leaf and Calvin Calvini for Mr. and Mrs. Michael Fornetti, whose family owned the Moon Lake Cabins north of Iron Mountain. The Fornettis operated the motel until the later 1970s, changing the name to Downtown Motel by 1967. It continued to operate as a hotel for some time, and now houses efficiency apartments. The building is a flat-roofed two-story structure with a single-story extension at each end, built of brown brick trimmed with concrete. Open exterior stairways at each end lead to a deck that fronts on the second floor units. When built, the motel contained eight rooms downstairs and seven upstairs.

=== Chamber of Commerce Visitor Center (600 Stephenson) ===
The Visitor Center was constructed in 1964-66 from a design by Iron Mountain native James C. Blomquist. It was designed to hold several tourist and business-oriented associations. It is a single-story symmetrical structure with a slightly recessed seven-bay center section flanked by two five-bay wings. The center section has a zig-zag roof and a double-door entrance located in the center bay. Each of the remaining six bays features an orange-red aggregate panel flanked by narrow floor-to-ceiling windows. The wings are constructed of red brick with a flat roof.

== See also ==
- Mesabi Range
- Soudan Underground Mine State Park
- Cliffs Shaft Mine Museum
- Cuyuna Range
- Vermilion Range (Minnesota)
- Gunflint Range
- Gogebic Range
- Marquette Iron Range
