= Cornish Pump =

Cornish Pump may refer to:

- Chapin Mine Steam Pump Engine, a steam engine located in Iron Mountain, Michigan, commonly called The Cornish Pump
- Cornish engine, a type of steam engine developed in Cornwall, England, mainly for pumping water from a mine.
