= Michigan Iron Industry Museum =

Mining museum in Negaunee, Michigan

Coordinates: 46.5217°N 87.5646°W

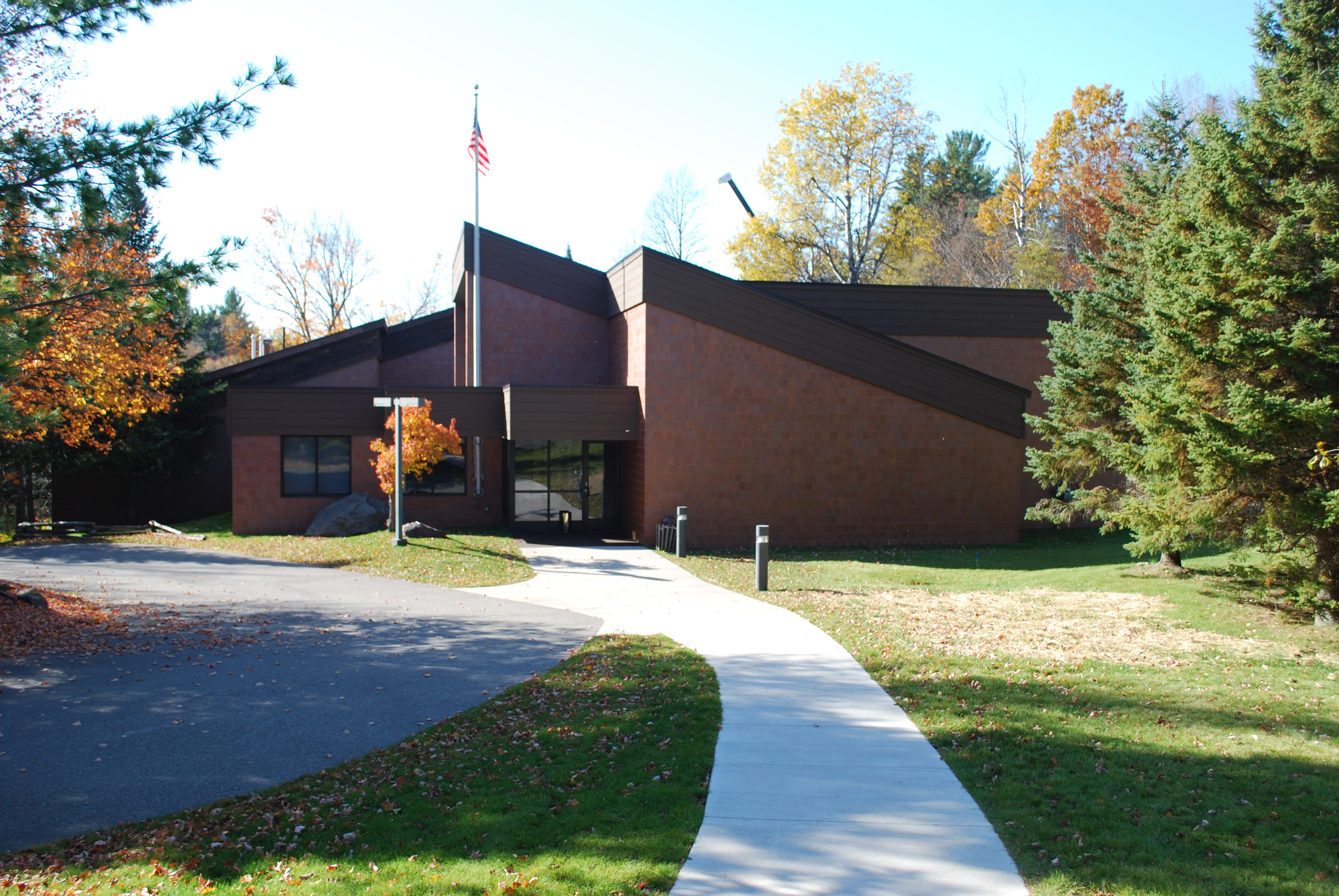
Michigan Iron Industry Museum Negaunee MI

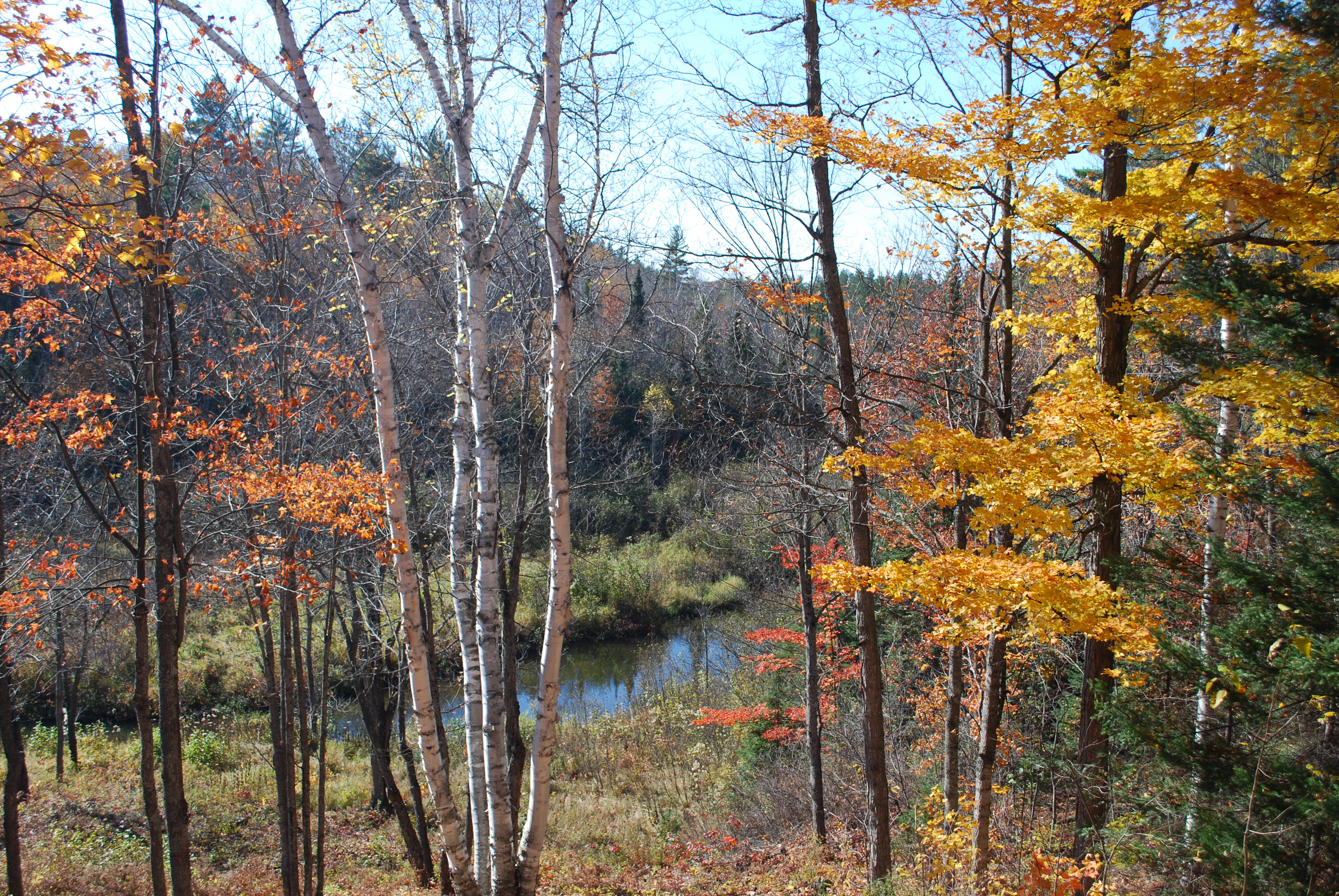
Historic forge site from grounds of museum

The Michigan Iron Industry Museum, a branch facility of the Michigan History Museum, is a community museum serving the heritage of the Marquette Iron Range on Michigan's Upper Peninsula. The museum is located in Negaunee, a town built atop the geological strata of the iron range near Marquette. Until recently, Negaunee was a one-industry town that centered on the mining of iron ore. The Negaunee region served as the center of U.S. iron ore production from about 1880 until approximately 1900, when this role was taken over by iron mines on Minnesota's Mesabi Iron Range. The Michigan Iron Industry Museum opened in 1987 close to the Carp River Forge site on the Carp River where Michigan iron ore was first forged in 1848.

Admission to the museum is free, and the museum is open year-round. The museum also serves as the focal point for the Iron Ore Heritage Trail, a 47-mile (76 km) bicycle and hiking trail that presents a look at some of the key sites of human and geological heritage on the Marquette Iron Range.
