= Iron Ore Heritage Trail =

Trail in Michigan, United States

The Iron Ore Heritage Trail is a 47-mile (76 km) bicycle and hiking trail in Michigan, United States, that presents a look at some of the key sites of human and geological heritage on the Marquette Iron Range. Trailheads are located at the Marquette Welcome Center in Marquette, and in Republic west of Marquette. The trail, which has a comparative change in elevation of 1,000 feet (300 m) (steep for the U.S. Midwest) covers much of the length of the Marquette Iron Range, a historically and commercially significant range of hematite and magnetite mined for more than 150 years as iron ore. The trail celebrates the geological and human heritage of the Marquette Iron Range, which dominated U.S. iron ore production from approximately 1880 until about 1900. Many of the buildings visible from the trail date back to this period of Victorian architecture. Additional focal points/parking lots for the trail are located at midpoints at the Michigan Iron Industry Museum in Negaunee and the Cliffs Shaft Mine Museum in Ishpeming.

The Iron Ore Heritage Trail is operated by the Iron Ore Heritage Trail Recreation Authority, a free-standing unit of local government that collects a property tax to support the trail. The trail was largely completed in 2013, but has been upgraded in several cycles since that time.

The Marquette Marathon is an annual event that takes place along the Iron Ore Heritage Trail.
