= Marquette Marathon =

American road race

- Date: Saturday of Labor Day weekend
- Location: Ishpeming, Michigan to Marquette, Michigan
- Event type: Paved Road
- Distance: 26.2 miles (42.2 km)
- Primary sponsor: Northern Michigan University and others
- Established: 1977
- Website: www.marquettemarathon.com
- Participants: 500+

The Marquette Marathon is an annual marathon in the Upper Peninsula of Michigan, United States. The course runs point-to-point, starting at Cliffs Shaft Mine Museum in Ishpeming, follows the Iron Ore Heritage Trail and ends at the Superior Dome in Marquette. It is held annually on the Saturday of Labor Day weekend. The race is one of the fastest Boston Marathon qualifiers in the USA, with a descent of almost 800 feet (240 m) in the first 5 miles (8.0 km). The section along the Iron Ore Heritage Trail is on a gravel-covered path through the forest, but the later part of the course features views of Lake Superior.

As of 1990, the Marquette Marathon was the only marathon in Michigan's Upper Peninsula. As such, it may have been the first marathon in Michigan's Upper Peninsula.

The Marquette Marathon brings nearly $500,000 to the Marquette community according to the Marquette Marathon committee, which is consistent with studies of the economic impact of smaller marathon events.

== Race history ==
The Marquette Marathon was first run in 1977 with 49 finishers. Since then, it has gone by several names and used different course routes. The first iteration of the Marquette Marathon was run from 1977 until 1982; the renamed Northern Shufflers Marathon was between 1984 and 1996. The race director in 1979 may have been Pat Nardini. The 1983 version of the race was known as the Marquette National Bank and Trust Marathon and featured a course from Negaunee, Michigan to Marquette that was described as "hilly from start to finish." The 1988 Northern Shufflers Marathon ran from the Wawonowin Golf Club in Ishpeming, Michigan and ended at Northern Michigan University.

In 1992, an organizer of the Northern Shufflers Marathon in Michigan organized the "Northern Shufflers Delaware Marathon" so that interested runners could complete a marathon in every US state as Delaware did not then have a marathon. The race started and finished at the University of Delaware fieldhouse. A total of 62 runners from 37 states took part in the one-time event.

The Marquette Marathon was restarted in 2010, and the current course, finishing at the Superior Dome, has been run since 2021. Before this change, the race finished on North Third Street near Blackrocks Brewery.

In 2020, the race was canceled due to COVID-19. However, nine runners ran the course in an unofficial virtual race.

The Marquette Marathon was part of the Great Lakes Marathon Series, a circuit of 25 marathon races near the Great Lakes, from 2013 until 2019.

== Race weekend ==
The race expo is held on Friday of Labor Day weekend at the Superior Dome. There is a one-mile kids' race called the Pebble Run on the same day.

On Saturday, the Marquette Marathon starts at 7:30 am; the Marquette Half Marathon starts in Negaunee, Michigan at 9:00 am; and the Wildcat 5 km race starts (at 9:00 am) and finishes at the Superior Dome.

== Winners ==
Date	Men's winner	Time (h:m:s)	Women's winner	Time (h:m:s)
August 30, 2025	Jesse Greenhagen	2:34:59.2	Grace Hayward	2:55:45.4
August 31, 2024	Adam Martin Caldwell	2:19:27.9	Courtney Rouse	2:59:54.8
September 2, 2023	Noah Jacobs	2:34:26.8	Violet Butts	2:59:45.8
September 3, 2022	Chris Scott	2:33:51.6	Elizabeth Dollas	2:54:48.1
September 4, 2021	Alex Dennis	2:39:05.9	Liza Breznau	2:59:15.8
August 31, 2019	Samuel Parlette	2:35:47.2	Tiffany Kari	3:05:11.8
September 1, 2018	Joe Ketarkus	2:59:58.3	Mandy Dye	3:10:17.7
September 2, 2017	Alex Prasad	2:43:03.6	Sarah Kasabian-Larson	2:57:17.8
September 3, 2016	Brad Vincent	2:49:51.2	Janet Becker	3:06:01.5
September 5, 2015	Nate Hoffman	2:36:41.1	Elizabeth Whiting	3:00:49.4
August 30, 2014	Vince Bechard	2:35:51.7	Christina Carradine	3:15:03.3
August 31, 2013	Jon Rock	2:29:04.6	Elizabeth Jones	3:06:56.5
September 1, 2012	Matthew Paullin	2:44:17.2	Christina Mishica	3:13:28.9
September 3, 2011	Luis Cruz	2:45:05.4	Elizabeth Jones	3:13:38.5
September 4, 2010	Ricky Alvarez	2:37:57.8	Elizabeth Jones	3:01:52.7
September 14, 1996	unknown	unknown	unknown	unknown
1995	unknown	unknown	unknown	unknown
1994	unknown	unknown	Gay Keskey	unknown
September 18, 1993	unknown	unknown	unknown	unknown
September 19, 1992	unknown	unknown	unknown	unknown
September 15, 1990	Judd Johnson	2:43:59	Wanda Cousineau	3:08:10
1989	unknown	unknown	unknown	unknkown
September 24, 1988	unknown	unknown	unknown	unknown
September 20, 1986	unknown	unknown	unknown	unknown
September 22, 1984	Chris Danielson	2:42:11	Rhonda Henderson	3:58:31
September 10, 1983	unknown	unknown	unknown	unknown
September 18, 1982	Chris Danielson	2:38:10	Laurie Hallifax	3:23:18
September 12, 1981	Doug Kurtis	2:15:31	Sally Sakalos	3:15:16
September 6, 1980	Doug Riske	2:32:16	Sheila Joosten	3:12:24
September 8, 1979	Chris Danielson	2:32:46	Eunice Carlson	2:50:53
September 9, 1978	Chris Glowacki	2:39:17	Eunice Carlson	3:00:31
September 10, 1977	Scott Lachniet	2:35:14	Denise Green	3:39:45

== Past half marathon winners ==
Date	Men's winner	Time (h:m:s)	Women's Winner	Time (h:m:s)
August 31, 2024	Ian Torchia	1:09:57.8	Maggie Priebe	1:19:50.7
September 2, 2023	Alex Dennis	1:09:22.7	Kathy Vandehy	1:14:11.8
September 3, 2022	Charles Smogoleski	1:06:05.8	Natalie Anderson	1:21:44.9
September 4, 2021	Richard Swor	1:06:20.1	Katie Lakin	1:22:11.3
August 31, 2019	Alexander Dennis	1:17:23.7	Callie Bartel	1:27:11.4
September 1, 2018	Samuel Parlette	1:11:45.2	Kameron Burmeister	1:19:04.8
September 2, 2017	Jeffrey Quednow	1:14:41.4	Callie Bartel	1:25:16.0
September 3, 2016	Nathaniel Langlie	1:15:32.2	Victoria Phillippi	1:28:10.1
September 5, 2015	Daniel Dehlin	1:13:46.5	Melissa Burkart	1:19:17.8
August 30, 2014	Tracy Lokken	1:14:45.1	Melanie Bicigo	1:28:51.1
August 31, 2013	Tracy Lokken	1:10:07.3	Alison Goss	1:28:43.8
September 1, 2012	Tracy Lokken	1:12:36.0	Alison Goss	1:33:17.7
September 3, 2011	Tracy Lokken	1:09:12.4	Alison Goss	1:32:20.8
September 4, 2010	Tracy Lokken	1:12:53.4	Valerie Kelso	1:34:49.2

== Past Wildcat 5 km winners ==
Date	Men's winner	Time (m:s)	Women's winner	Time (m:s)
August 31, 2024	Qwynn Darnell	17:16.5	Emma Ziegler	23:06.1
September 2, 2023	Qwynn Darnell	17:27.2	Chessie Sergey	21:20.2
September 3, 2022	Anthony Plana	18:25.7	Chessie Sergey	22:00.5
September 4, 2021	Scott Carhoun	18:16.1	Roman Menhart	21:59.2
August 31, 2019	Jeffrey Quednow	17:53.1	Amber Huebner	22:06.8
September 1, 2018	Lucas Cavalieri	18:46.2	Laurie Tardiff	21:05.3
September 2, 2017	Brent Skaw	18:01.1	Deedra Irwin	19:05.8
September 3, 2016	Richard Sandlin	17:16.5	Rebecca Kraemer	23:09.1
