= Cliffs Shaft Mine Museum =

Museum in Michigan, United States

Cliffs Shaft Mine
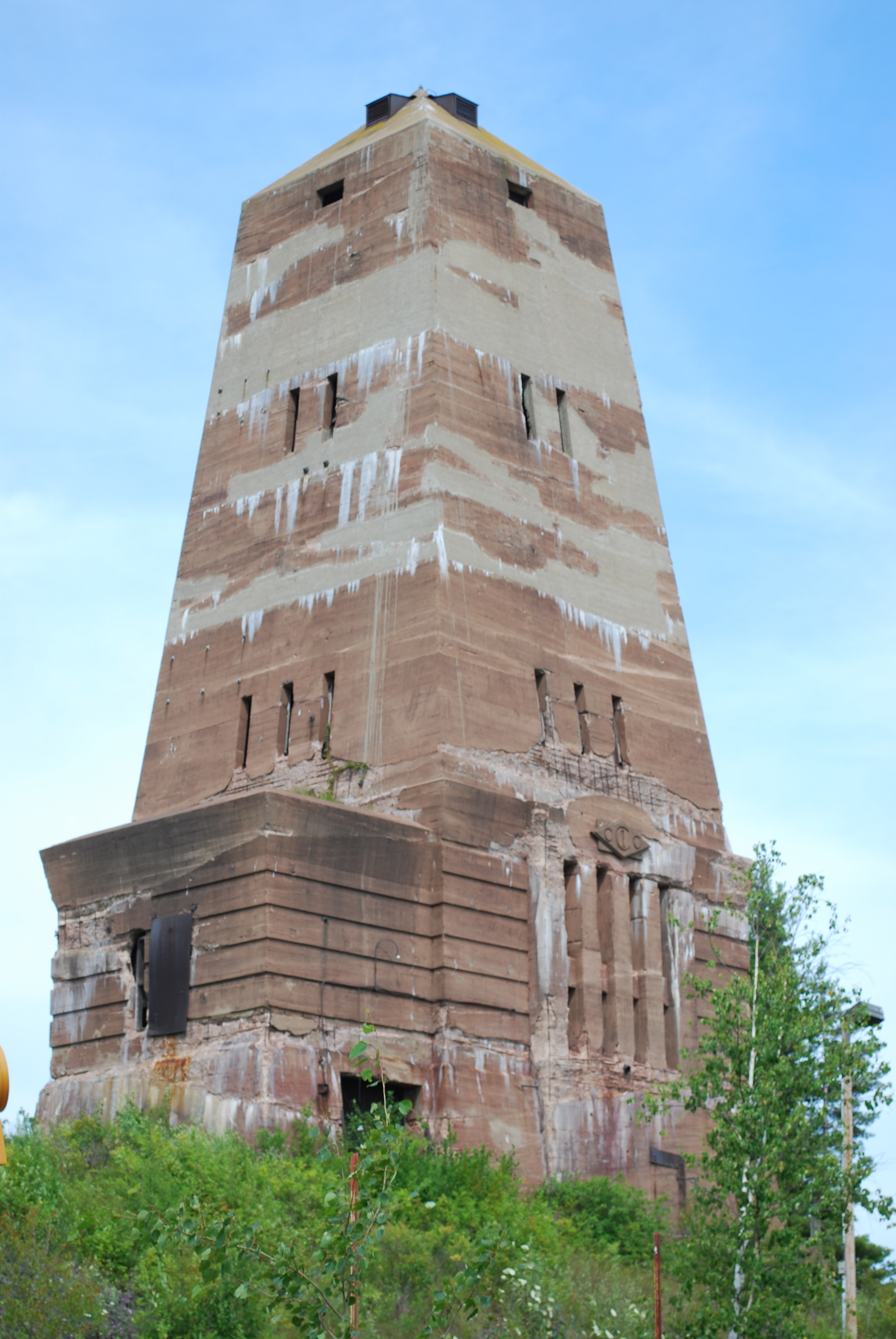
- The old headframe of "B" Shaft, built 1919

- Location in Michigan
- Interactive map
- Location: Ishpeming, Michigan, United States; 46°29′28″N 87°40′31″W
- Products: Iron
- Opened: 1868
- Closed: 1967
- Cliffs Shaft Mine
- U.S. National Register of Historic Places
- U.S. Historic district
- Michigan State Historic Site
- Built: 1880, 1919
- Architect: George W. Maher
- Architectural style: Exotic Revival, Egyptian Revival
- NRHP reference No.: 92000832

Significant dates
- Added to NRHP: July 17, 1992
- Designated MSHS: March 14, 1973
- Company: Cleveland Cliffs

The Cliffs Shaft Mine Museum is a former iron mine, now a heritage museum, located on Euclid Street between Lakeshore Drive and Spruce Street in Ishpeming, Michigan. The museum, operated by "Marquette Range Iron Mining Heritage Theme Park Inc.", celebrates the history of the Marquette Iron Range. The site was designated a state of Michigan historic site in 1973 and placed on the National Register of Historic Places in 1992.

== History ==
The Iron Cliffs Company was established in 1865 by a group of New Yorkers including Samuel J. Tilden. They obtained property in Marquette County and opened their first mine, the Barnum Mine, in 1867. Two shaft, the "A" and "B" were sunk. The company obtained three more mine pits by 1870. In 1877, Iron Cliffs began exploratory drilling on this site overlooking Ishpeming. Drilling uncovered iron ore, and in 1879 the company opened the Cliffs Shaft, then known as the "New Barnum". A new boiler house and engine house were built on the site in the early 1880s.

In 1888, the name was changed from "New Barnum" to the "Cliffs Shaft." However, more changes were afoot: in 1891, the assets of the Iron Cliffs Company were merged with that of other iron companies in the area, including the Jackson Mine and the Cleveland Mine, to form the Cleveland-Cliffs Iron Company, with William G. Mather as president of the merged company. A new dry was built after a disastrous fire in 1901. The original timber headframes over the A and B shafts were replaced with concrete headframes in 1919; a larger modern "C" shaft and headframe was built in 1955.

The mine was at one time the nation's largest producer of hematite, and shipped ore every year but one from 1887 until its eventual close. Mining at this site continued until 1967, marking the end of underground iron mining in the area.

The Cliffs Shaft mine complex was listed on the National Register of Historic Places in 1992. It is commemorated by a Michigan Historical Marker In 1998, the former owners of the mine donated the majority of the property of the Cliffs Shaft mine to the nonprofit group so that a museum could be created there. The museum opened in 1999.

== Description ==
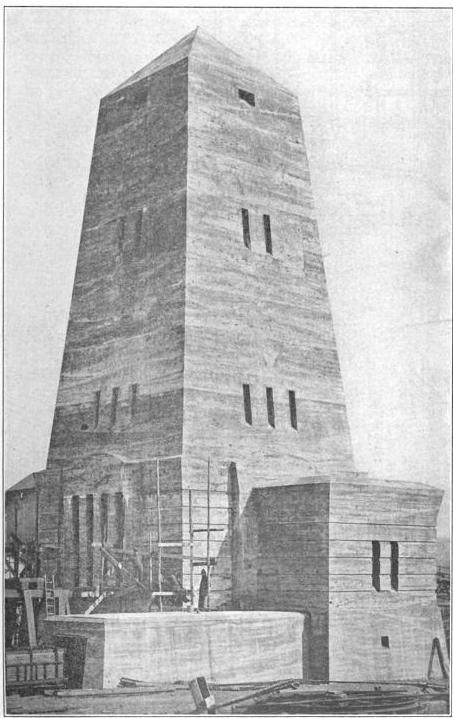
Headframe, c. 1919 just after completion

Above ground, the Cliffs Shaft site covers 15 acres and includes three headframes and eight other buildings.

=== 1919 headframes ===
The two 1919 headframes, mirror images of each other, are unusual as a collaboration between mining engineers and a professional architect.

In 1919, Cliffs Shaft engineers determined that the two wooden headframes atop their A and B shafts were deteriorating and would soon be unsafe. When Cliffs Shaft engineers presented company president William G. Mather with proposals to update the headframes, Mather suggested that, because of the prominence of their location, the headframes combine practicality with architectural beauty. The company retained George Washington Maher, a Prairie School architect from Chicago's Condron Company, to design the new headframes. Maher came up with a distinctive obelisk-shaped, Egyptian Revival design for the headframes.

The company immediately began building the new headframes around the old wooden ones. The new headframes were of reinforced concrete, with an interior measurement of 33 feet (10 m) square at the base, eventually tapering to 21 feet (6.4 m) square at the top. A pyramidal roof brought the full height to 96 feet 9 inches (29.49 m). The structures are substantially similar, but mirror images of each other. The positions of interior beams were largely determined by available openings in the wooden headframes being built around. Work continued from July into December 1919.

=== 1955 headframe ===
The third headframe was built in 1955 of concrete with metal facing. It was the first Koep Hoist built in the Western Hemisphere.

=== Other structures ===
The site also includes the single-story stone boiler house and engine house (1880), the single-story brick dry house (1901–02), a laboratory (c. 1917), a brick blacksmith shop, and the brick mine office building.

=== Underground ===
Underground, the Cliffs Shaft Mine was one of the largest iron mines in Michigan, containing 65 miles (105 km) of tunnels running to depths of 1,358 feet (414 m). It continues to be one of the best-preserved examples of underground mining in the Marquette Iron Range.

== Museum ==
Visitors can see mining artifacts, photographs and equipment, as well as a chemical lab, blasting items, and the engine house with its air compressor room. Tours are available. The museum also displays the mineral collections of the Ishpeming Rock and Mineral Club. The shaft site and museum are served by the Iron Ore Heritage Trail, a 47-mile (76 km) bicycle and hiking trail that covers much of the length of the Marquette Iron Range.

The Cliffs Shaft Mine Museum is the starting location for the Marquette Marathon.

Structures on the Cliff Shafts Mine site

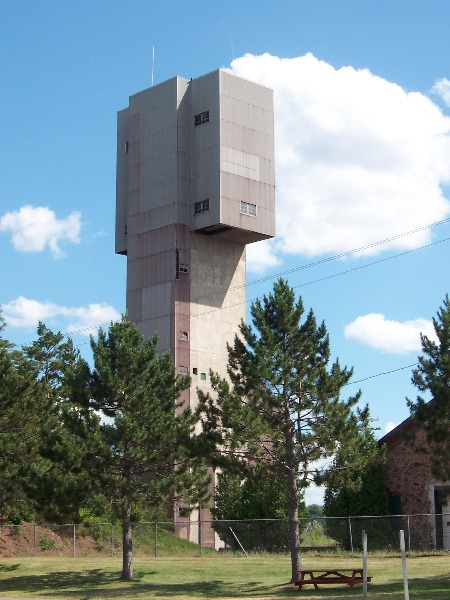
"Koepe" Hoist "C" Shaft headframe, built in 1955.

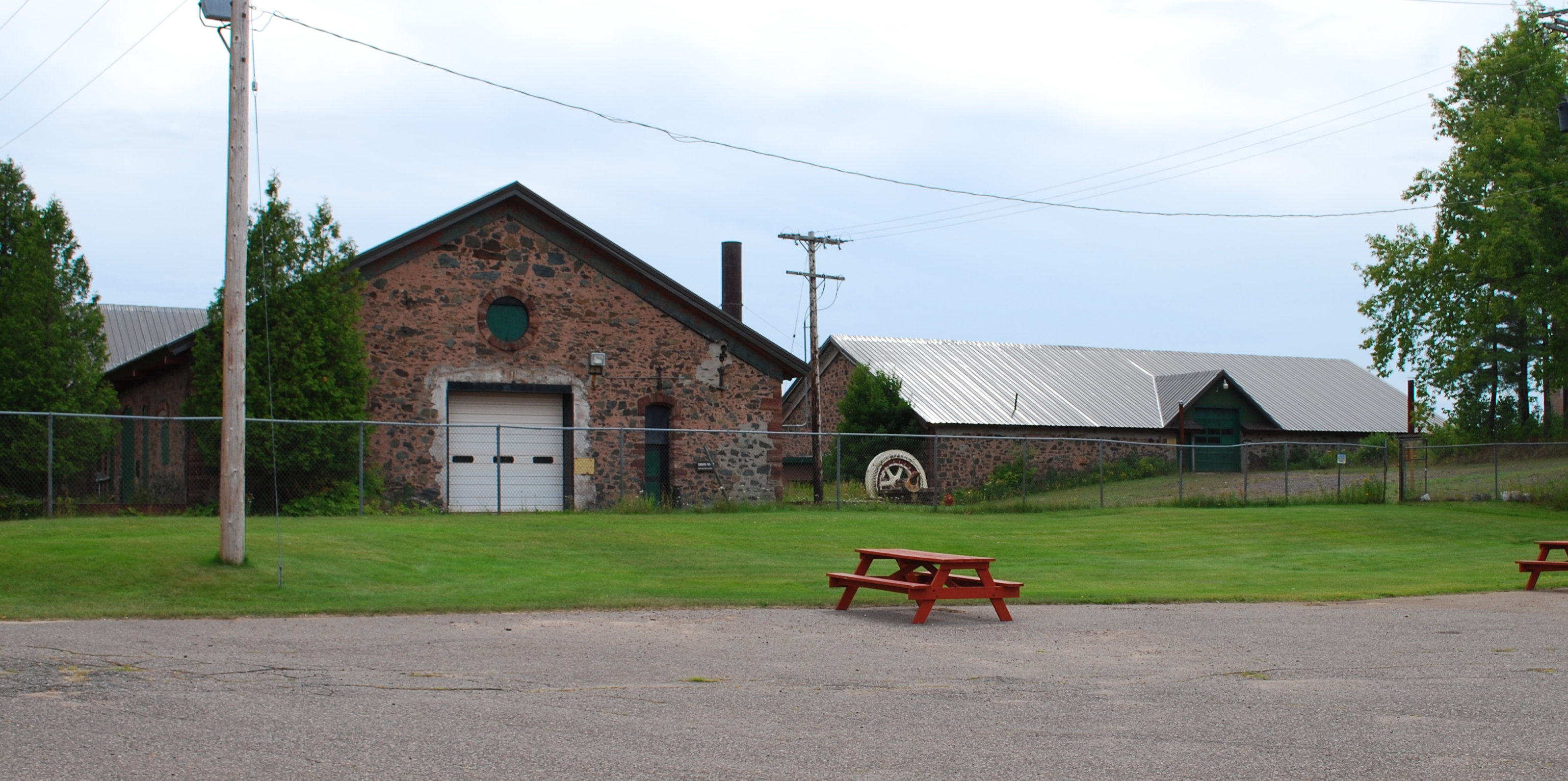
Buildings

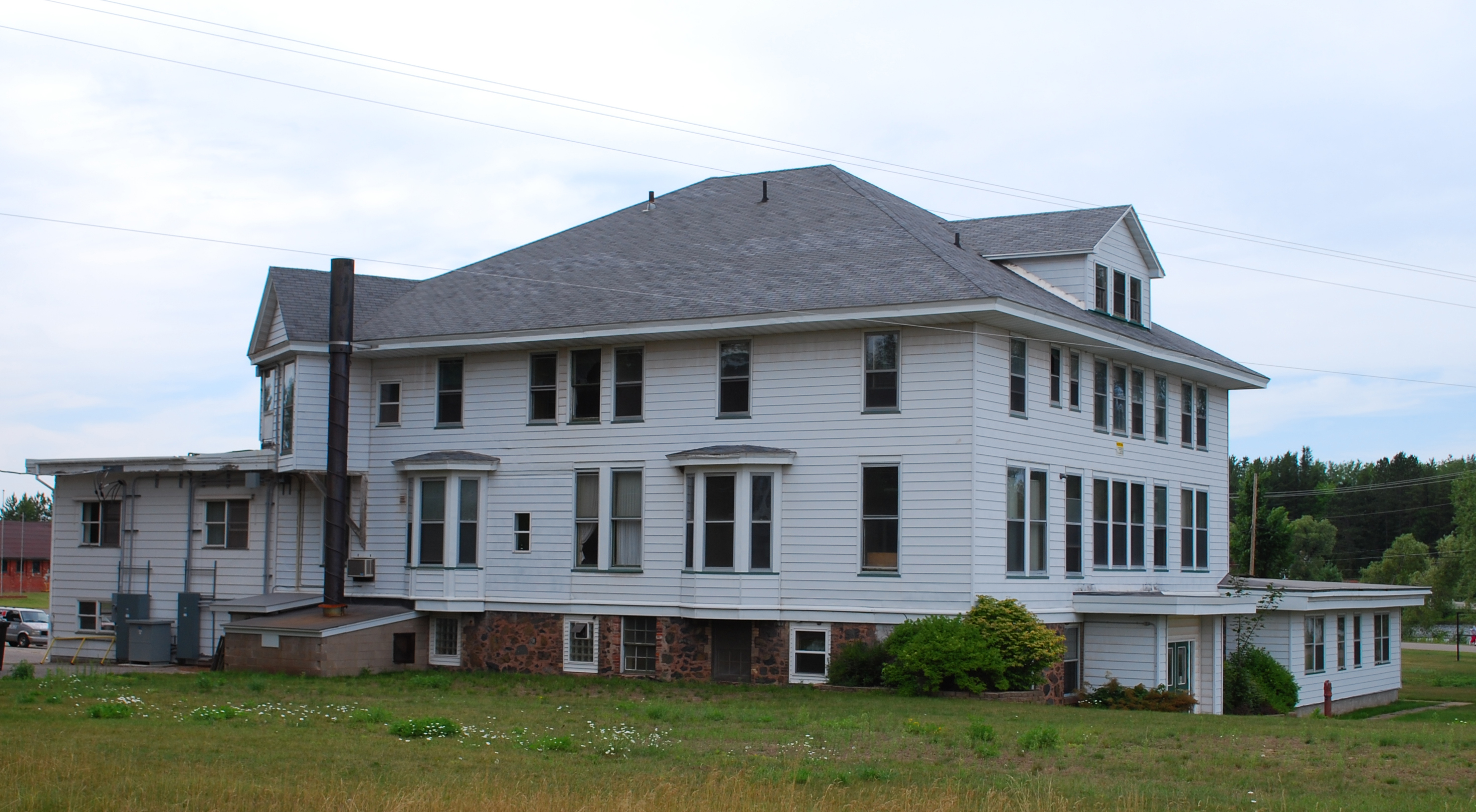
Former CCI central office, now demolished

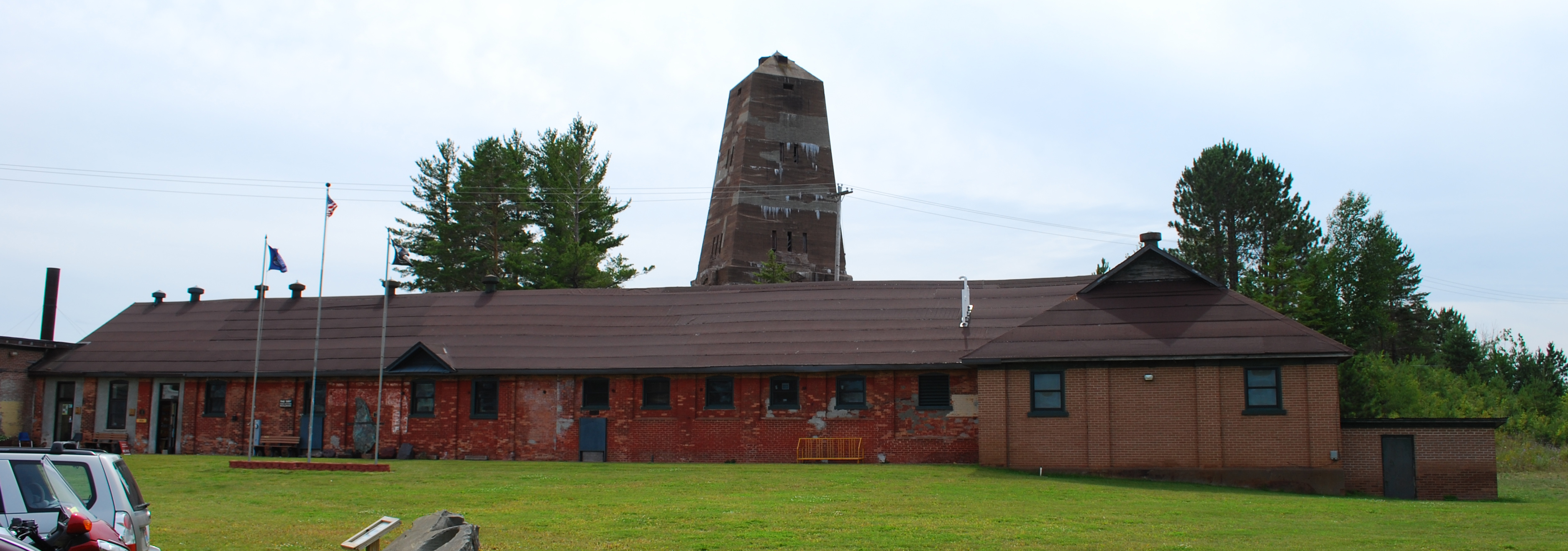
Museum, located within the former "dry house" and with the 1919 "B" Shaft headframe standing behind it.

== See also ==
- Mesabi Range
- Soudan Underground Mine State Park
- Gogebic Range
- Cuyuna Range
- Vermilion Range (Minnesota)
- Gunflint Range
- Iron Mountain Central Historic District
