= Vancouver Whitecaps (disambiguation) =

Vancouver Whitecaps FC is a soccer team that has played in MLS since 2011.

Vancouver Whitecaps may also refer to:

- Vancouver Whitecaps (1974–1984), a former member of the now-defunct North American Soccer League
- Vancouver Whitecaps (1986–2010), a former member of the Canadian Soccer League, the United Soccer Leagues First Division and the USSF Division 2
- Vancouver Whitecaps FC (women) (2003–2012), a member of the United Soccer Leagues W-League

== See also ==
- Whitecaps FC 2 (2015–2017), a reserve club that played in the United Soccer League
- Vancouver Whitecaps FC U-23 (2005–2014), reserve club that played in the USL Premier Development League
- Whitecaps FC Academy, academy division of the club
