= Whitecap Mountains =

Ski resort in Anderson, Wisconsin

Coordinates: 46°24′18″N 90°24′13″W

The Whitecap Mountains is a ski resort located in the community of Upson, Iron County, Wisconsin. It has 43 ski runs across 400 acres, and lies in the Penokee Mountain Range 16 miles off the southern Lake Superior shoreline. The terrain is diverse enough to accommodate skiers of all difficulty levels. The resort has existed since the 1960s, and has called itself "the snowiest ski resort in Wisconsin."

Whitecap is traditionally known as the home of the "Chinese Downhill" competition in the late 80's, with rumors that this tradition would be revived (with increased safety measures). The race has been known to be a significant career booster, with high level executives from NCR, Modine and Williams having been participants. The resort was lovingly managed on a shoestring by Dave and Evie Lundberg from 1964 to 2018, when it was sold after the passing of Dave Lundberg. In January, 2019, the main lodge suffered a devastating fire, which the new owners were pledging to rebuild. No one was injured, and the resort stayed open.

As of 2025, it's owned by Midwest Skiing Company LLC. In November 2025, the resort filed for Chapter 11 bankruptcy, blaming extremely low snowfall for interfering with revenue. The resort exited bankruptcy in July 2026.
