= Marquette Iron Range =

Iron ore deposit in Michigan, US

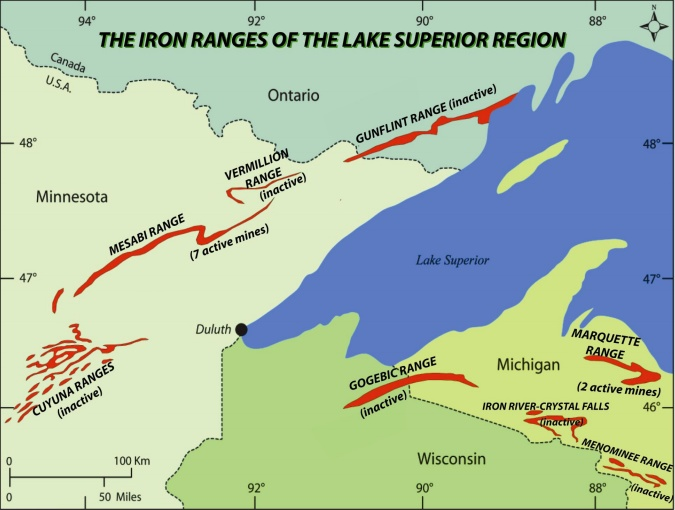
Lake Superior Iron Ranges

The Marquette Iron Range is a deposit of iron ore located in Marquette County, Michigan. The towns of Ishpeming and Negaunee developed as a result of mining this deposit. A smaller counterpart of Minnesota's Mesabi Range, this is one of two iron ranges in the Lake Superior basin that are in active production as of 2018. The iron ore of the Marquette Range has been mined continuously from 1847 until the present day. Marquette Iron Range is the deposit's popular and commercial name; it is also known to geologists as the Negaunee Iron Formation.

== History ==
The geology of the district consists of middle Precambrian rocks in the Animikie Group, which form a westward plunging syncline 33 miles (53 km) long and 3 to 6 miles (4.8 to 9.7 km) wide. The principal iron ore is found in the Negaunee Iron formation. This formation is 2,500 feet (760 m) thick near Negaunee. This is a magnetite or hematite chert. Natural ore deposits are located in synclines and up against mafic dikes. Beneficiation commenced in 1954, and this concentration of iron into pellets accounted for 73 percent of production by 1965. Early mining used open-pit mining methods, which was replaced with underground mining by 1880.

The Marquette Iron Range was discovered in 1844 by a party of surveyors led by William A. Burt, who found that their sensitive magnetic compasses produced skewed results because of the concentration of iron in the land they were surveying. Mining began in 1847. At first, the hematite iron ore of the Marquette Range was smelted with local charcoal into pig iron, but after the opening of the first Soo Canal in 1855 the iron ore was shipped down the Great Lakes from the newly developed port city of Marquette. It was not until 1873, more than twenty years after iron ore began to be shipping from the range, that railroads finally penetrated the Marquette. Capitalists from Cleveland played a key role in the development of the Marquette Iron Range, and the Cleveland-Cliffs Iron Company acquired a controlling influence on the range by 1890.

== Present ==
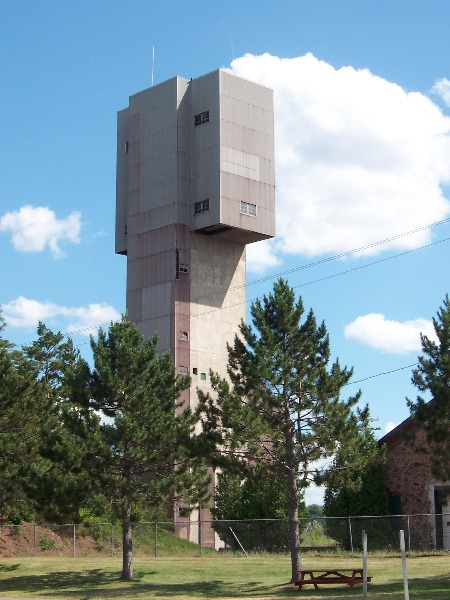
Cliffs Mine on Marquette Range

Until 2016, Cleveland-Cliffs’ Empire and Tilden mines continued to produce iron ore from the Marquette Range. The Empire Mine ceased production in August 2016 and was placed in an indefinite idle state. Cleveland-Cliffs ships Tilden ore by a wholly owned short-line railroad, the Lake Superior and Ishpeming, to Marquette for transport by lake freighter to steel mills in the lower Great Lakes.

The Marquette Iron Range was designated as a Michigan registered historic site in 1957, listed as S-0035. The Cliffs Shaft Mine Museum in Ishpeming and the Michigan Iron Industry Museum in Negaunee each celebrate the history of the iron ore deposit and its miners. A 47-mile-long (76 km) hiking trail from Republic to Marquette, called the Iron Ore Heritage Trail, provides access to the area's historical sites.

== See also ==
- Gogebic Range
- Banded iron formation
- Taconite
