= Chapin Mine Steam Pump Engine =

- U.S. National Register of Historic Places
- Michigan State Historic Site
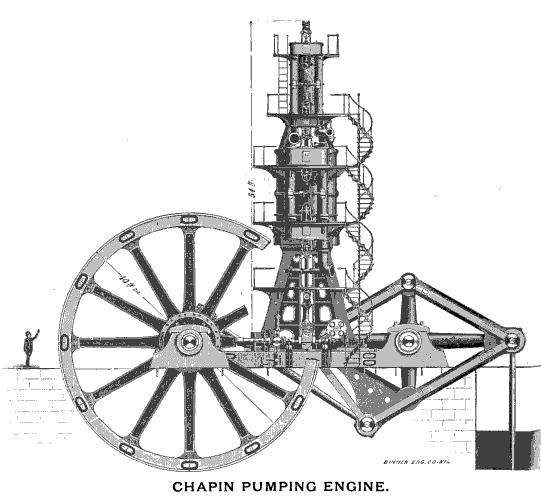
- Illustration from E.P. Allis Co, manufacturer. Note figure at left for scale.

- Location within Michigan Location within the United States
- Interactive map
- Location: Kent St., Iron Mountain, Michigan
- Coordinates: 45°49′30″N 88°4′12″W
- Area: 1 acre (0.40 ha)
- Built: 1891
- Architect: Edwin P. Reynolds
- NRHP reference No.: 81000305

Significant dates
- Added to NRHP: July 9, 1981
- Designated MSHS: February 19, 1958

The Chapin Mine Steam Pump Engine, also known as the Cornish Pump, is a steam-driven pump located at the corner of Kent Street and Kimberly Avenue in Iron Mountain, Michigan, United States. It is the largest reciprocating steam-driven engine ever built in the United States. It was listed on the National Register of Historic Places in 1981, and designated a Michigan State Historic Site in 1958.

== History ==
Iron ore was discovered in what is now the Iron Mountain area in 1878. Development was rapid: Iron Mountain was platted in 1879 and the Chapin Mine Company was formed the same year. The Chapin Mine proved to be the most productive in the Menominee Range, but part of the orebody was underneath a cedar swamp and water seepage proved to be an ongoing problem. Ground pumps were used at first, but as the shaft depth increased, so did the problems. In 1889, after a number of accidents, the mining company commissioned a water pump from the E. P. Allis Company of Milwaukee, Wisconsin (now Allis-Chalmers). The company's chief engineer, Edwin P. Reynolds, designed a "Cornish Pump" similar to those used in tin mines in Cornwall, England.

The company constructed the pump in 1890-91, after which it was installed at Chapin Mine's "D" shaft. The pump engine was installed at the surface near a boiler, to minimize efficiency losses in steam transport and to prevent damage to the engine in case of an emergency shut-off. It was housed in a massive red sandstone pump house, 60 feet (18 m) high, 36 feet (11 m) by 42 feet (13 m) at the base, with a foundation 23 feet (7.0 m) thick. The pump itself cost $82,000, and the entire installation cost an estimated $250,000. The pump began operation on January 3, 1893.

An underground shift in 1896 misaligned the engine, and further shifts cracked the engine house and the surrounding ground. In 1899, the pumping engine was dismantled and stored away.

In the meantime, the Chapin Mining Company had been expanding. In 1894, it acquired the nearby Hamilton and Ludington mines, both of which had been abandoned due to flooding problems. Chapin dewatered the other mines and made underground connections to the Chapin Mine. The Chapin Mining Company was purchased by the Oliver Iron Mining Company, a subsidiary of U.S. Steel, in 1901. In 1907, Oliver reassembled the pumping engine and moved it to its current location near the site of the Ludington Mine "C" shaft. They constructed a corrugated metal building on a red sandstone foundation to house the pumping engine. The pump served the combined needs of the Chapin, Ludington and Hamilton mines until 1914, when it was replaced with electric pumps.

By the time the Chapin Mine closed in 1932, it had produced over 27 million tons of iron ore, the most in the Menominee Iron Range. Two years later, the Oliver Iron Mining Company donated the Chapin Mine Steam Pump Engine to Dickinson County as a "relic for sightseers to visit." The county demolished the building housing the pumping engine and painted the engine to make it more attractive to tourists. The engine was nearly scrapped during World War II for its metal content, and indeed the steel frame shaft housing standing nearby was dismantled, but local sentiment saved the pumping engine.

== Cornish Pumping Engine and Mining Museum ==
In 1978, the county turned it over to the Menominee Range Historical Foundation, who constructed a museum around it in 1982-83. It was designated a Michigan State Historic Site in 1958, and was listed on the National Register of Historic Places in 1981. In 1987, the American Society of Mechanical Engineers designated the pump a National Historic Mechanical Engineering Landmark.

The museum housing the pump, known as the Cornish Pumping Engine and Mining Museum, also displays a varied collection of mining equipment used in local iron mines; the museum is open to the public.

== Gallery ==
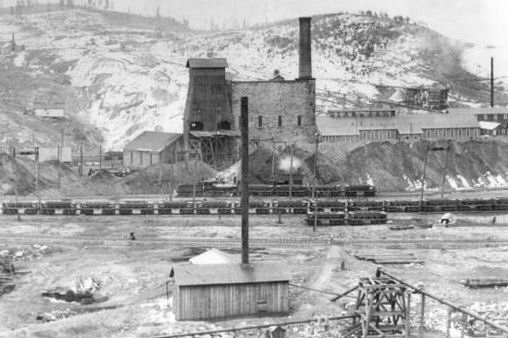
Chapin Mine D Shaft, original site of the Cornish Pump, c. 1900

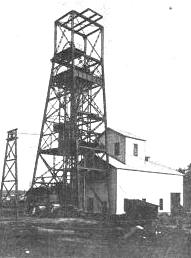
Ludington Mine C Shaft, installation of the Cornish Pump c. 1909

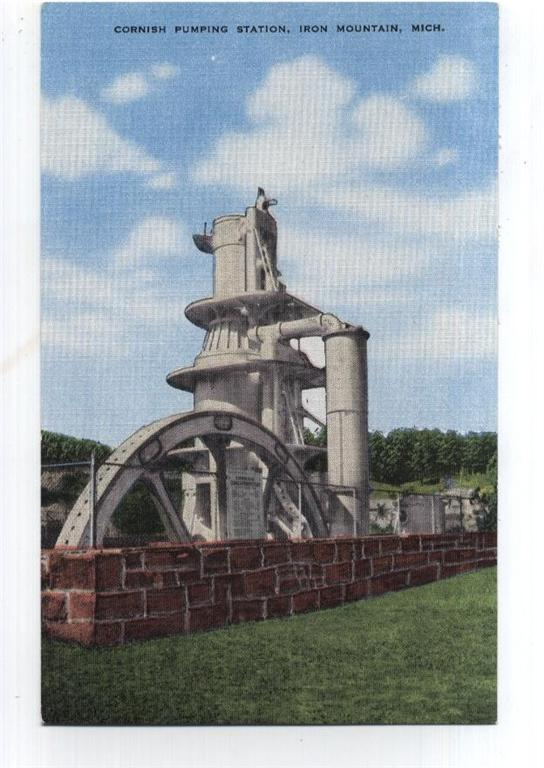
Pumping engine c. 1950

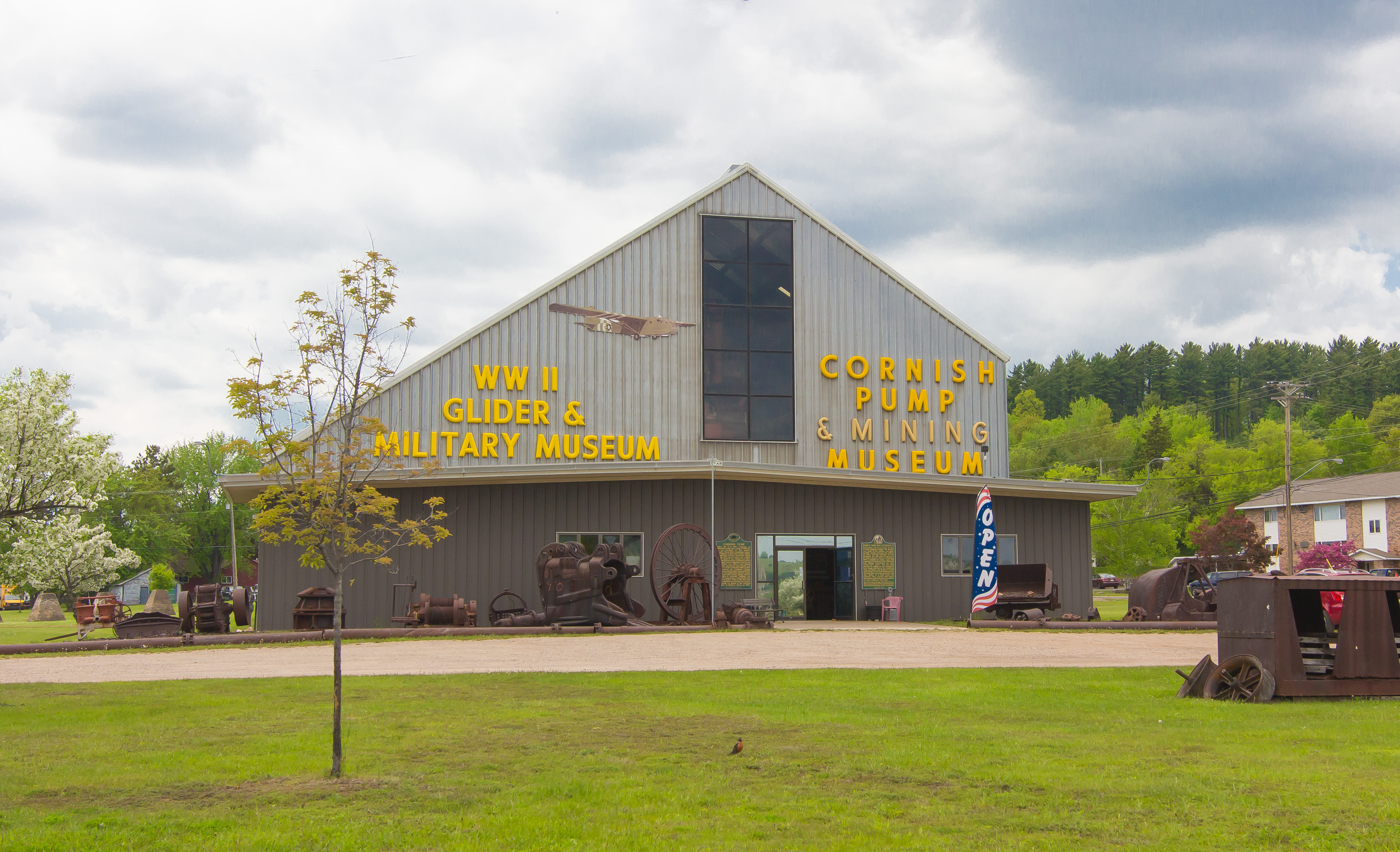
The Mining Museum, 2019

== Description ==
The Chapin Mine Steam Pump Engine is a vertical tandem compound steam engine. At its maximum speed of 10 rpm, it produced over 1,200 horsepower (890 kW), and during operation required 11,000 short tons (10,000 t) of coal per year to operate. It is 54 feet (16 m) tall with a flywheel 40 feet (12 m) in diameter, weighing 164 short tons (149 t). The entire engine weighs 600 short tons (540 t). The drive shaft is 24 inches (61 cm) in diameter and the high and low pressure steam are 50 inches (130 cm) and 100 inches (250 cm) in diameter, respectively, both having a stroke of 10 feet (3.0 m).

At the Ludington "C" shaft location, the pumping engine was connected via a 7 inches (18 cm) diameter shaft to a series of eight pumps, the deepest of which was 1,500 feet (460 m) below ground (at the original Chapin "D" shaft location, the depth was only 600 feet (180 m)). Each pump had plungers 28 inches (71 cm) in diameter with a stroke of 10 feet (3.0 m). Water was pumped by each pump through a vertical pipe to a discharge tank just beneath the next pump in series, and thus was carried in eight steps to the surface. The total capacity of the pump system was 3,400 US gallons (13,000 L) per minute.

Although the Chapin Mine Steam Pump Engine is popularly known as "The Cornish Pump", it is not actually a Cornish engine, which lacks the rotating parts (connecting rod, crank and flywheel) seen in the Chapin Engine. Rather, the name comes from the similarity between the Chapin engine and those used in tin mines in Cornwall in the 19th century.

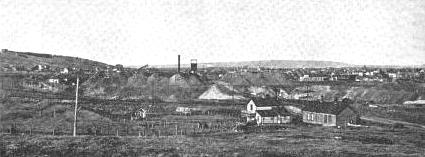
Chapin Mine panorama, c. 1909
