= List of Michigan State Historic Sites in Mason County =

Location of Mason County in Michigan.

The following is a list of Michigan State Historic Sites in Mason County, Michigan. Sites marked with a dagger (†) are also listed on the National Register of Historic Places in Mason County, Michigan.

== Current listings ==
Name	Image	Location	City	Listing date
Armistice Day Storm Informational Designation	Armistice Day Storm	Stearns Park Beach along North Lakeshore Drive	Ludington	November 6, 1970
Big Sable Point Light Station†	Big Sable Lighthouse1	Big Sable Point in Ludington State Park	Hamlin Township	May 19, 1988
First Mason County Courthouse		1687 South Lakeshore Drive	Ludington	May 17, 1978
Fish House (demolished)		407 West Filer	Ludington	June 15, 1979
Ghost Town of Hamlin Informational Site		Ludington State Park Beach House within Ludington State Park	Hamlin Township	September 25, 1956
Daniel W. Goodenough House	Daniel W. Goodenough House	706 East Ludington Avenue	Ludington	October 27, 1984
Frank N. and Fannie Allen Latimer House	Frank N. and Fannie Allen Latimer House	701 Ludington Avenue	Ludington	May 30, 1996
Ray Lessard House	Ray Lessard House	110 North Lavinia Street	Ludington	July 26, 1974
Marquette's Death Informational Site	Marquette's Death - Michigan Historical Marker	Pere Marquette Conservation Park; 1497 South Lakeshore Drive	Pere Marquette Township	April 6, 1966
Mason County Informational Designation / Mason County Courthouse†	Ludington Courthouse	300 East Ludington Avenue	Ludington	August 15, 1975
Notipekago Commemorative Designation		South Custer Road just north of Conrad Road near the Pere Marquette River	Custer Township	November 18, 1993
Reorganized Church of Jesus Christ of Latter Day Saints	Church of Latter Day Saints	2579 Free Soil Road	Free Soil	August 3, 1979
SS Badger†	SSBadger	700 William Street	Ludington	March 6, 1997
SS Pere Marquette 18 Informational Designation	SS Pere Marquette 18	Stearns Park Beach along North Lakeshore Drive	Ludington	December 14, 1976
Scottville Informational Designation	Scottville	Downtown Mall along North Main Street	Scottville	July 20, 1989
Swedish Lutheran Church	Swedish Lutheran Church	501 East Danaher Street	Ludington	April 15, 1999

== See also ==
- National Register of Historic Places listings in Mason County, Michigan

== Sources ==
- Historic Sites Online – Mason County. Michigan State Housing Developmental Authority. Accessed January 23, 2011.
