= Ludington State Park Beach House =

- Lake Michigan Beach House, Ludington State Park
- U.S. National Register of Historic Places
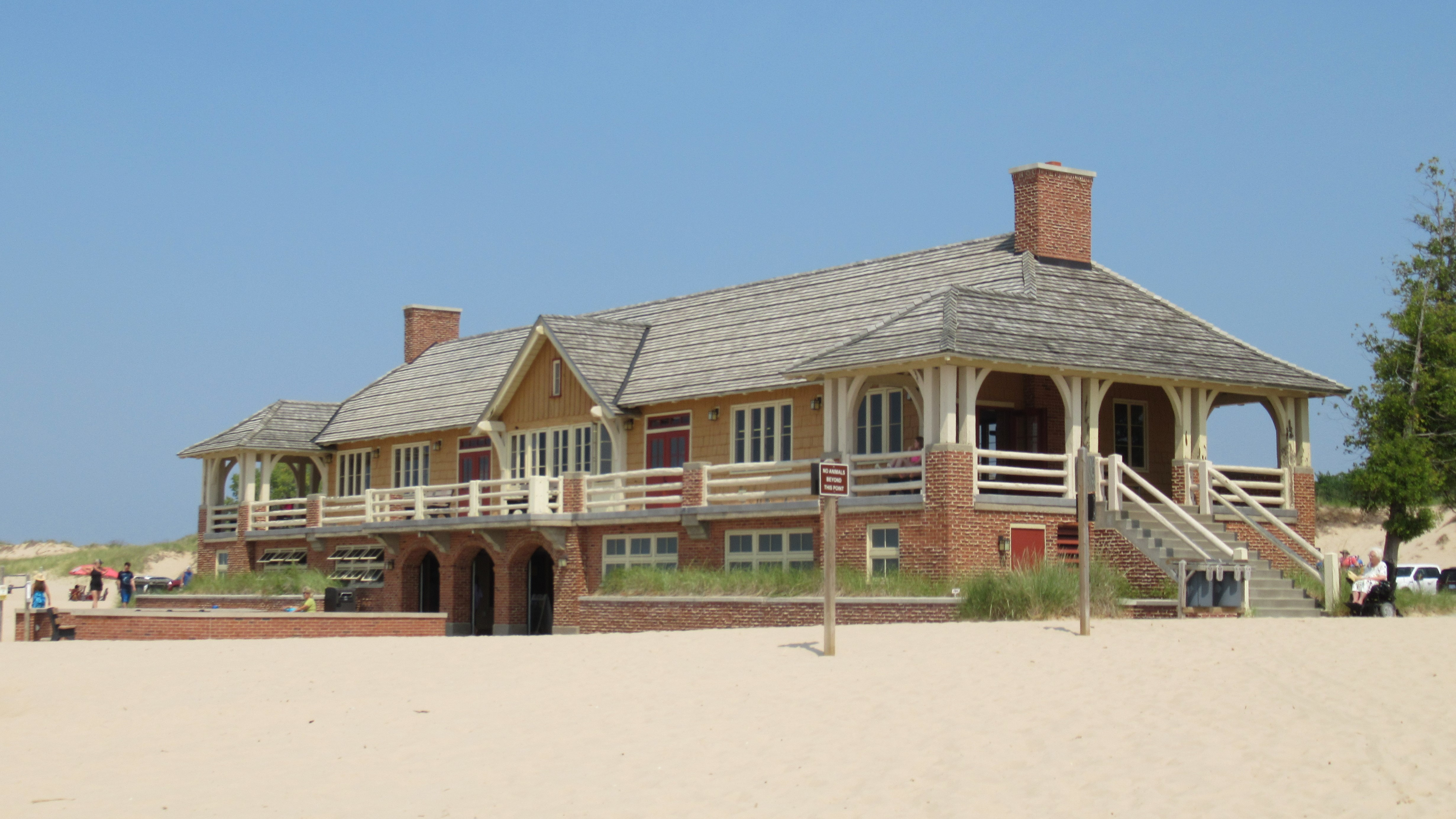
- Ludington Beach House in August 2023

- Location within Michigan Location within the United States
- Interactive map
- Location: 8800 W. M-116 (Hamlin Township)
- Coordinates: 44°1′56″N 86°30′29″W
- Area: 1 acre (0.40 ha)
- Built: 1935
- Architect: Ralph B. Herrick
- Architectural style: Arts and Crafts
- NRHP reference No.: 13000798
- Added to NRHP: September 30, 2013

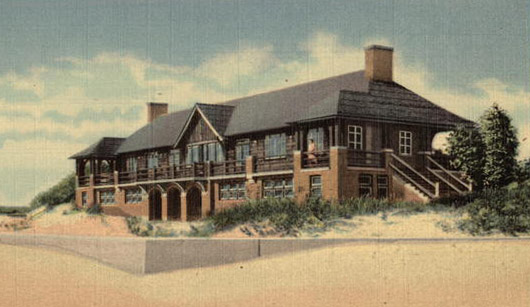
Ludington Beach House c. 1950

The Lake Michigan Beach House at Ludington State Park is a public building located at 8800 West M-116 in Hamlin Township. It is the only Arts and Crafts beachhouse on Lake Michigan, and was listed on the National Register of Historic Places in 2013.

== History ==
At the beginning of the 1930s, as the Great Depression worsened, Franklin Roosevelt created the Civilian Conservation Corps (CCC). The Civilian Conservation Corps Camp Ludington-Pere Marquette SP-2 was established in 1933. That same year, architect Ralph B. Herrick designed this beach house for the park. The Ludington State Park Beach House was constructed by the Civilian Conservation Corps in 1935.

In 2013, the beach house underwent an extensive renovation.

== Description ==
The Ludington State Park Beach House is a two-story square plan building measuring 116 feet (35 m) by 35 feet (11 m). It sits on a concrete foundation, and has red brick walls on the lower story, wooden singles on the upper story, and a cedar shingle hip roof. Three brick archways on the lower floor provide access from the beach house directly to the Lake Michigan beach.

The upper floor of the beach house, originally intended to be a public lodge, has a wooden floor, large timber beams, and a brick and stone fireplace. The lower floor was constructed with dressing and shower rooms, toilets and a confectionery stand/grocery store.
