= M-116 (Michigan highway) =

State highway in Mason County, Michigan, United States

M-116
- M-116 highlighted in red

Route information
- Maintained by MDOT
- Length: 7.018 mi (11.294 km)
- Existed: c. June 1928–present

Major junctions
- South end: US 10 in Ludington
- North end: Ludington State Park entrance

Location
- Country: United States
- State: Michigan
- Counties: Mason

Highway system
- Michigan State Trunkline Highway System; Interstate; US; State; Byways
← M-115	→ M-117

M-116 is a 7.018-mile-long (11.294 km) state trunkline highway in the US state of Michigan that begins in Ludington at an intersection with US Highway 10 (US 10) at James Street and Ludington Avenue. The road travels northward, much of it along the shore of Lake Michigan before reaching its terminus at the entrance to Ludington State Park. The roadway has been in the state highway system since the late 1920s. It has been realigned a few times, most recently in the late 1990s.

== Route description ==
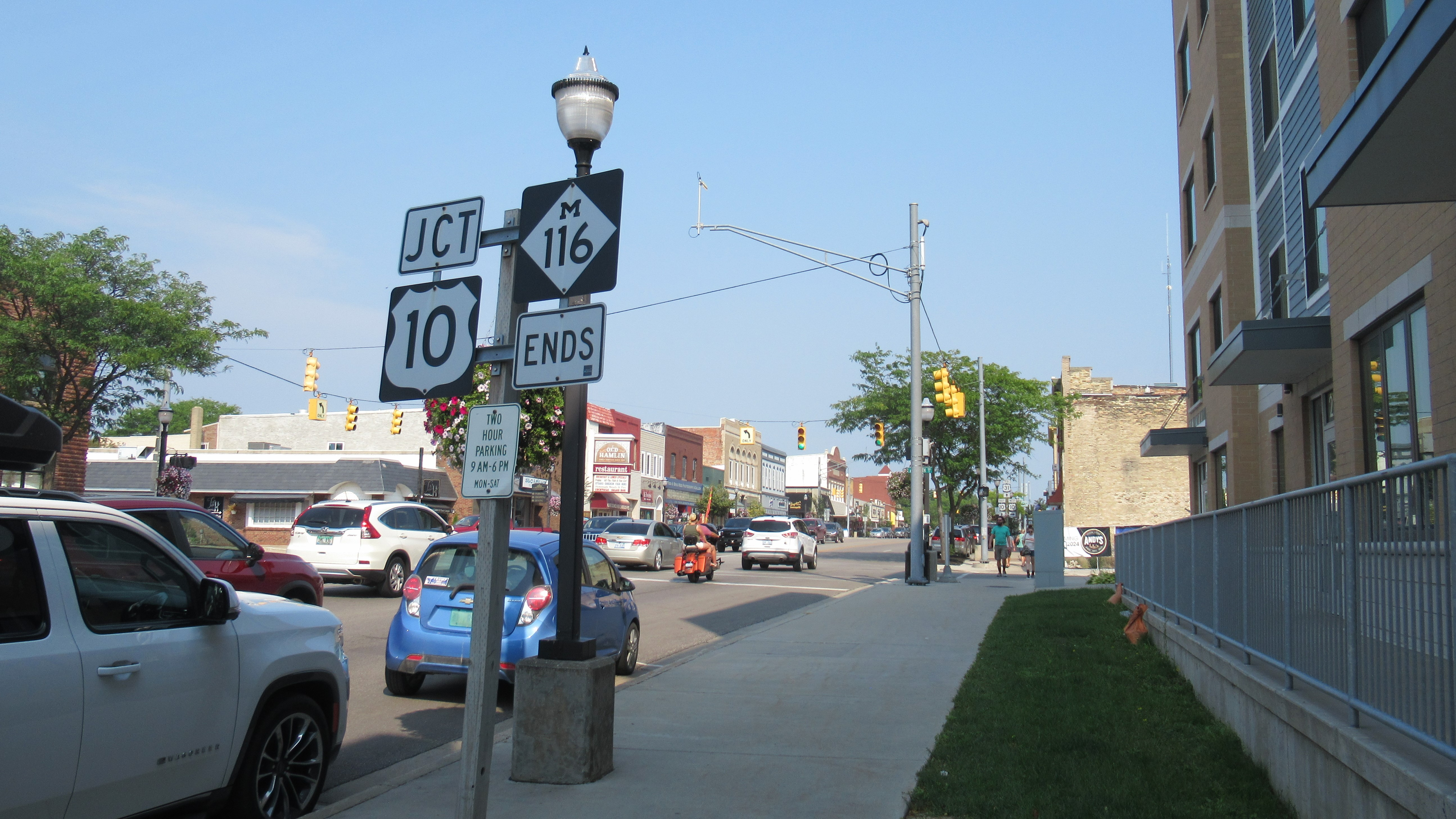
Southern terminus of M-116 at US 10 in Ludington

M-116 begins in Ludington at the intersection of James Street and Ludington Avenue. It is at this intersection where US 10 turns southward and heads to the Ludington–Manitowoc ferry docks. From here, M-116 continues westward along Ludington Avenue through a mixed commercial area for about one-half mile (0.8 km) before turning north on Lakeshore Drive. The road continues as North Lakeshore Drive through resident areas and passes the Lakeview Cemetery. Before passing the Lincoln Hills Golf Club, M-116 crosses a narrow section of Lincoln Lake and then curves westward towards the shore of Lake Michigan as it approaches the state park. The route runs along the coast of Lake Michigan for the remainder of its route, through an area of sand dunes, until reaching its northern terminus at the entrance to Ludington State Park.

Ludington State Park is bound to the west by Lake Michigan, the north by sand dunes and to the east by Hamlin Lake. As such, M-116 provides the only road access to the park from the south. The park encompasses 5,300 acres (2,100 ha) offering biking, hiking, fishing, tubing, boating and ice skating in the winter. The park is also home to the 112-foot (34 m) tall Big Sable Point Lighthouse, built in 1867, which is listed on the National Register of Historic Places.

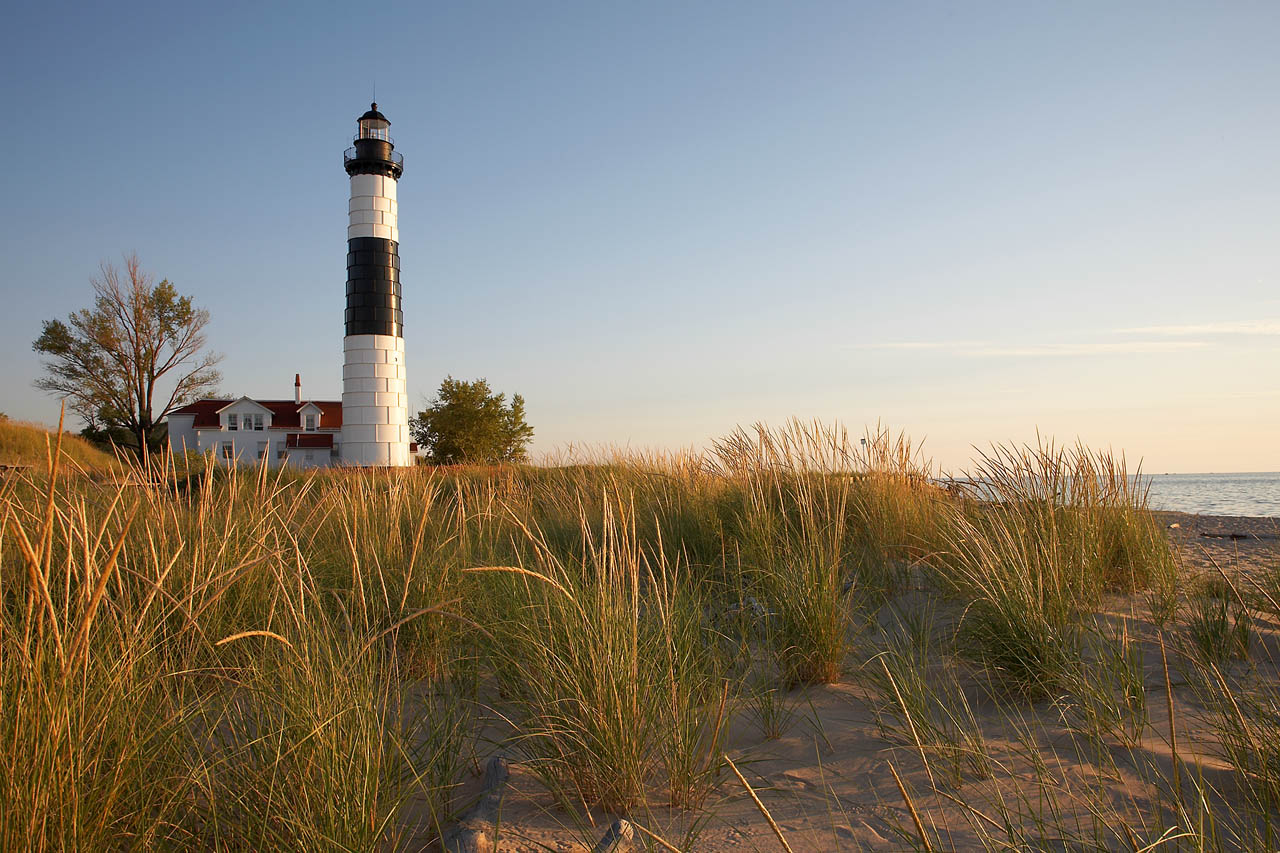
Big Sable Point Lighthouse

The highway is maintained by the Michigan Department of Transportation (MDOT), which is responsible for maintaining and constructing transportation infrastructure in the state, including highways. As part of this role, the department periodically conducts surveys on their highways to measure traffic volume. This is expressed in terms of average annual daily traffic (AADT), which is a measure of traffic volume for any average day of the year. In 2009, MDOT calculated that 7,377 vehicles used the southern section of M-116 daily near the US 10 junction. On the north end, only 859 vehicles used the roadway near the state park entrance each day. The highway has not been listed on the National Highway System, a network of roads important to the country's economy, defense, and mobility.

In December 2014, Michigan Governor Rick Snyder authorized a portion of the highway in Ludington State Park between Little River and Big Sable in Mason County to be named "The Paul K. Butterfield II Memorial Highway", in honor of that Michigan State Police Trooper who was murdered during a traffic stop there in 2013. The ceremony to do so took place in early February 2015.

== History ==
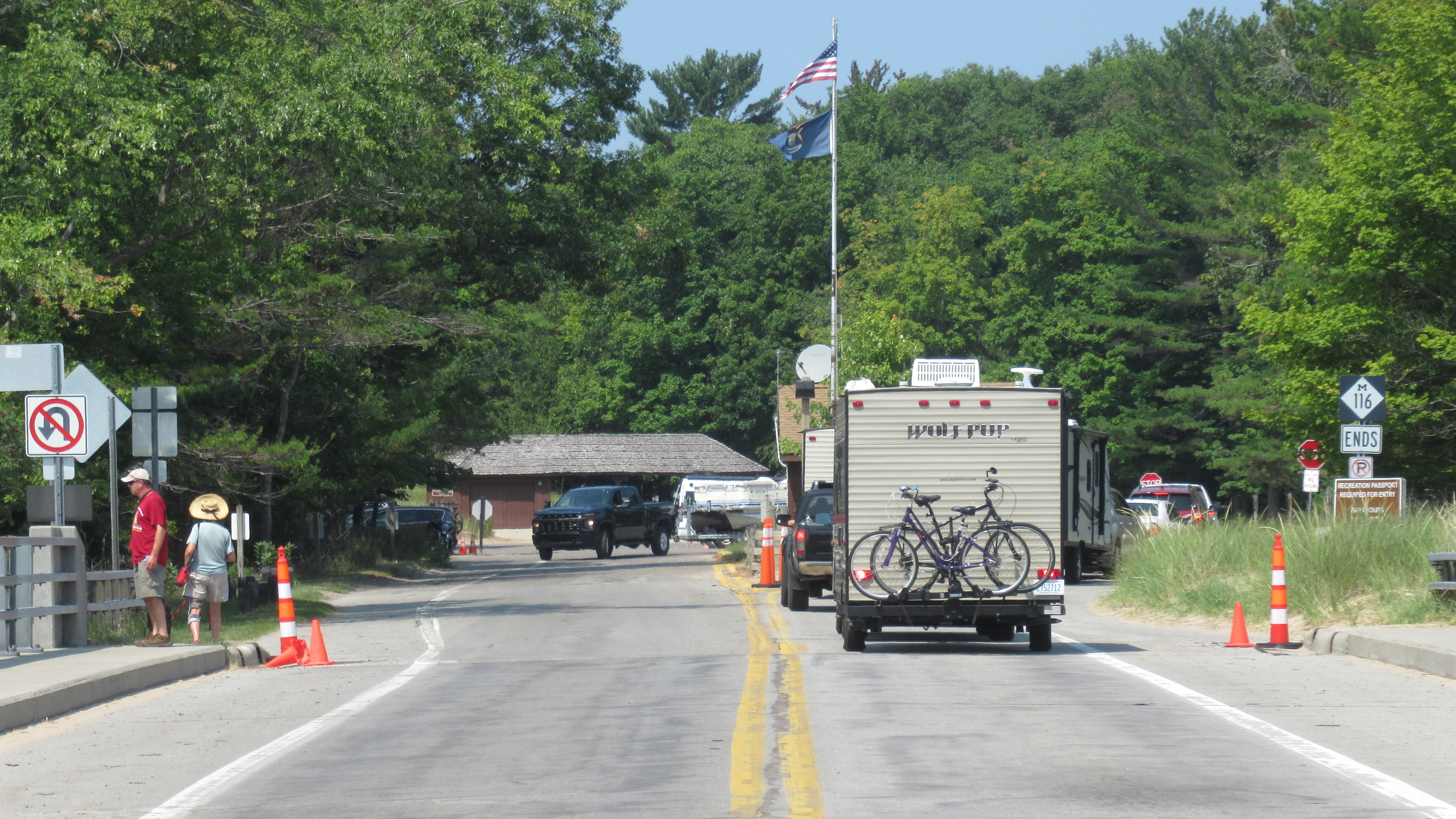
Northern terminus at the entrance of Ludington State Park

M-116 was first designated in May or June 1928 from the north city limit of Ludington north to the Sable River, but not all of it was built and open to traffic. It was extended southerly in 1931 into the city of Ludington to US 10. There was a new alignment closer to the lakeshore opened in early 1933. The northern end was extended in late 1935 to encompass the Big Sable River bridge. The last change to the routing was made in 1998 when US 10 was shifted to follow James Street instead of William Street to the car ferry docks. At that time, M-116 was extended east along Ludington Avenue to end at James Street.

== Major intersections ==
The entire highway is in Mason County.

Location	mi	km	Destinations	Notes
Ludington	0.000	0.000	US 10 to US 31	
Hamlin Township	6.852	11.027	Ludington State Park Entrance	Highway terminates at the entrance gate to the park
1.000 mi = 1.609 km; 1.000 km = 0.621 mi

== See also ==
- Nordhouse Dunes Wilderness
