= Charles G. Bryant Double House =

Historic house in Maine, United States

- U.S. National Register of Historic Places
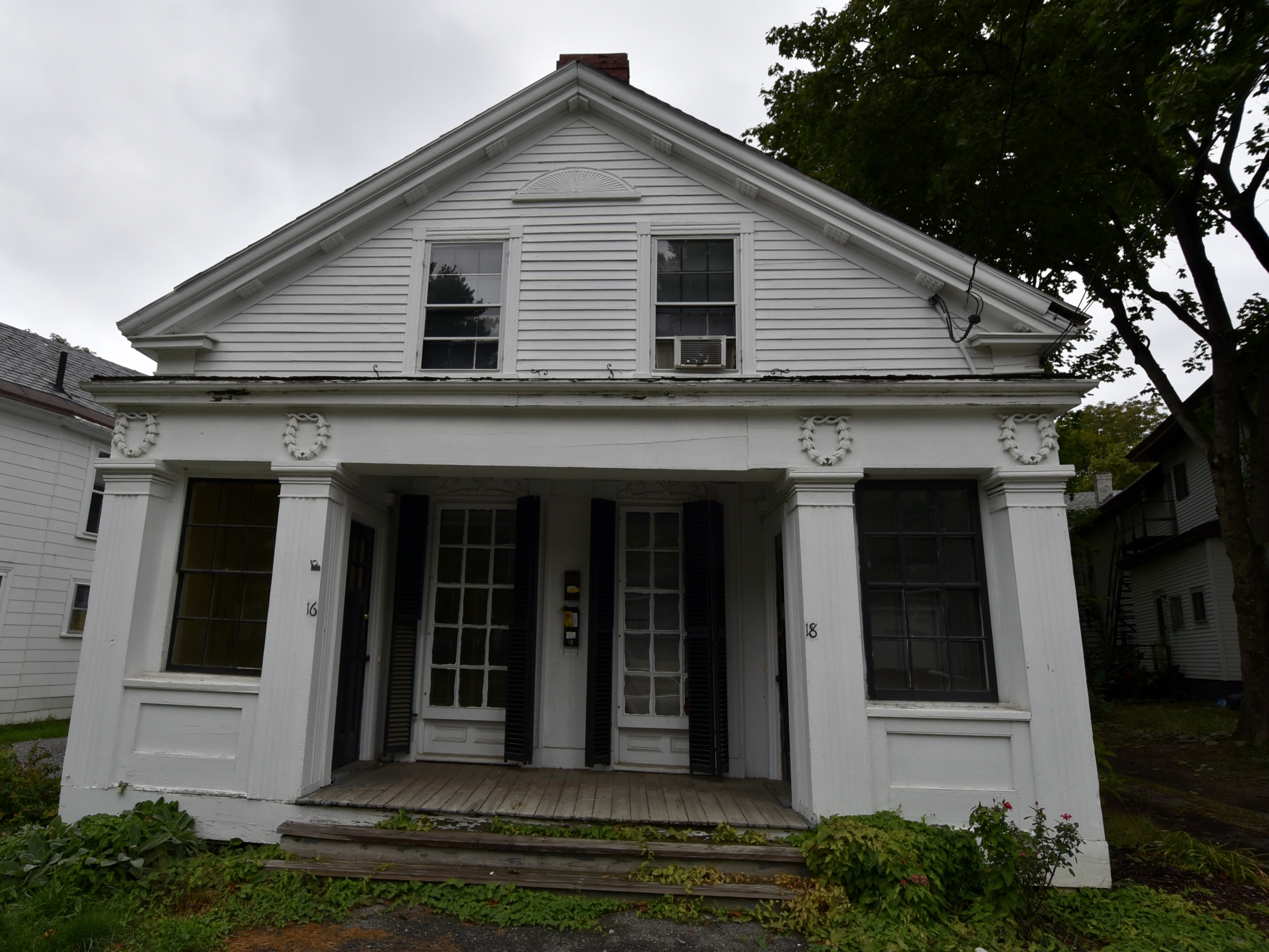

- Location within Maine Location within the United States
- Location: 16-18 Division St. Bangor, Maine
- Coordinates: 44.8083°N 68.7758°W
- Area: 0.3 acres (0.12 ha)
- Built: 1836
- Architect: Charles G. Bryant
- Architectural style: Greek Revival
- NRHP reference No.: 86001338
- Added to NRHP: June 20, 1986

The Charles G. Bryant Double House is a historic residential duplex at 16-18 Division Street in Bangor, Maine. Built in 1836 as a speculative venture by architect Charles G. Bryant, it has, unlike many similar local buildings of the period, retained most of its original Greek Revival styling. It was listed on the National Register of Historic Places in 1986.

== Description and history ==
The Bryant Double House is located in a densely built residential area north of downtown Bangor, standing on the north side of Division Street midway between Kenduskeag Avenue and Prentiss Street. It is a 1 1/2-story wood-frame structure, with a front-facing gabled roof and clapboard siding. The building corners have fluted pilasters, with entablatures running down the sides. A single-story hip-roof porch-and-vestibule section projects from the front, with an open porch area at the center, with side-facing entrances to vestibules whose fronts are defined by fluted pilasters topped by an entablature with garlands.

This house was built in 1836 to a design by Bangor architect Charles G. Bryant. It was built by Bryant as a speculative venture at a time when the city was experiencing significant growth, and a housing boom was taking place. He is known to have built a number of them, of which this is the only one to retain most of it original styling. The amount of Greek Revival detail is unusual for such a modest residence, and was only normally found on the city's larger-scale houses.

== See also ==
- National Register of Historic Places listings in Penobscot County, Maine
