= Hannibal Hamlin =

Vice President of the United States from 1861 to 1865

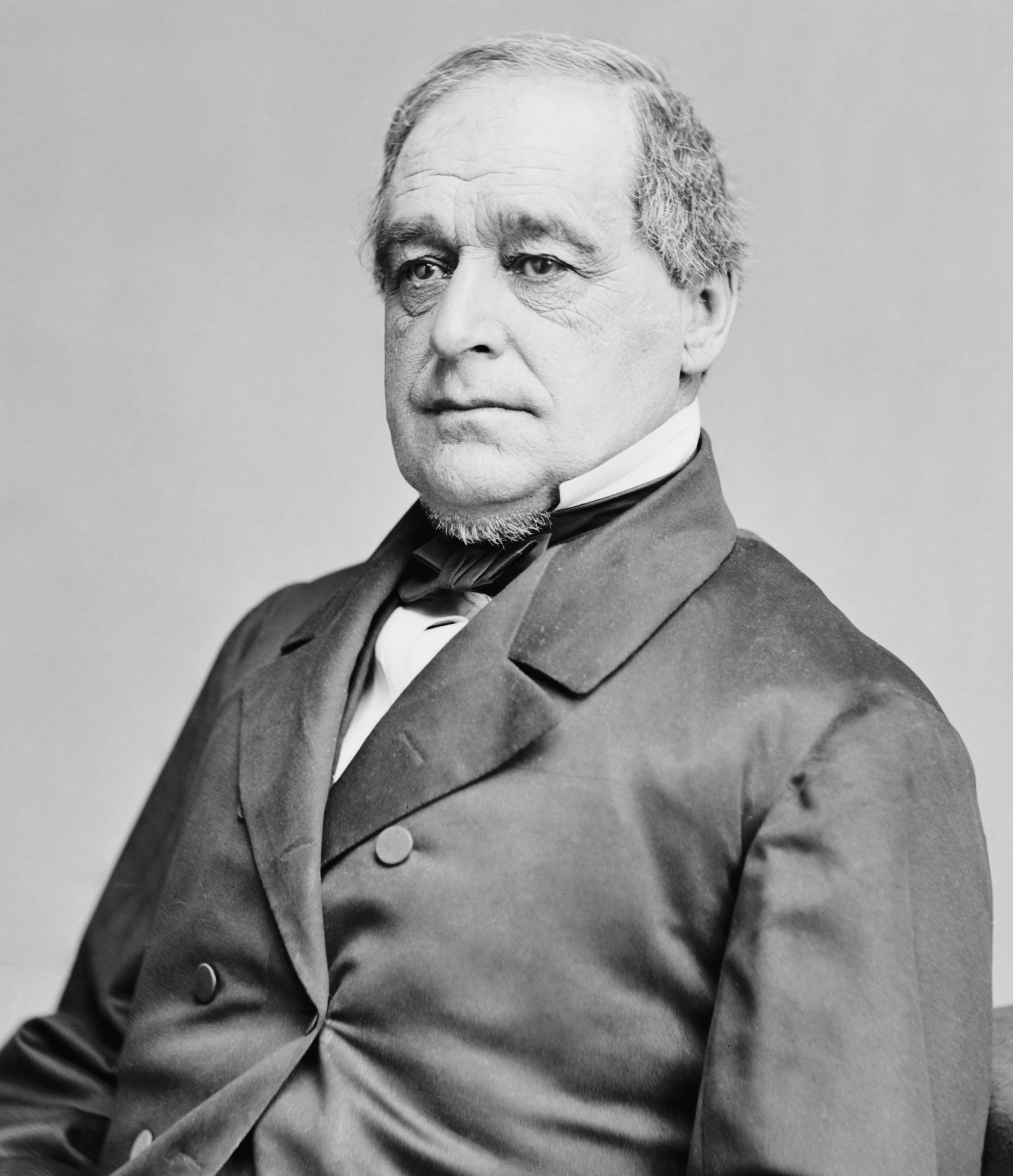
- Hamlin c. 1860–1865

15th Vice President of the United States
- In office March 4, 1861 – March 4, 1865
- President: Abraham Lincoln
- Preceded by: John C. Breckinridge
- Succeeded by: Andrew Johnson

23rd United States Minister to Spain
- In office December 20, 1881 – October 17, 1882
- President: Chester A. Arthur
- Preceded by: Lucius Fairchild
- Succeeded by: John W. Foster

United States Senator from Maine
- In office March 4, 1869 – March 3, 1881
- Preceded by: Lot M. Morrill
- Succeeded by: Eugene Hale
- In office March 4, 1857 – January 17, 1861
- Preceded by: Amos Nourse
- Succeeded by: Lot M. Morrill
- In office June 8, 1848 – January 7, 1857
- Preceded by: Wyman B. S. Moor
- Succeeded by: Amos Nourse

26th Governor of Maine
- In office January 8, 1857 – February 25, 1857
- Preceded by: Samuel Wells
- Succeeded by: Joseph H. Williams

Member of the U.S. House of Representatives from Maine's 6th district
- In office March 4, 1843 – March 3, 1847
- Preceded by: Alfred Marshall
- Succeeded by: James S. Wiley

Personal details
- Born: August 27, 1809 Paris, Massachusetts (now Maine), U.S.
- Died: July 4, 1891 (aged 81) Bangor, Maine, U.S.
- Resting place: Mount Hope Cemetery
- Party: Republican (after 1856)
- Other political affiliations: Democratic (before 1856)
- Spouses: Sarah Emery (m. 1833; died 1855) Ellen Emery (m. 1856)
- Children: 6, including Charles, Cyrus, and Hannibal

Military service
- Allegiance: United States
- Branch/service: Maine State Guard
- Years of service: 1864
- Rank: Corporal
- Battles/wars: American Civil War

Hannibal Hamlin (August 27, 1809 – July 4, 1891) was an American politician and diplomat who was the 15th vice president of the United States, serving from 1861 to 1865, during President Abraham Lincoln's first term. He was the first Republican vice president.

As an attorney from Maine, Hamlin began his political career as a Democrat in the Maine House of Representatives before being elected twice to the United States House of Representatives, and then to the United States Senate. With his strong abolitionist views, he left the Democratic Party for the newly formed Republican Party in 1856. In the 1860 general election, Hamlin balanced the successful Republican ticket as a New Englander partnered with the Midwesterner Lincoln. Although not a close friend of the president, he lent loyal support to his key projects such as the Emancipation Proclamation during the American Civil War.

In the 1864 election, Hamlin was replaced as vice-presidential nominee by Andrew Johnson, a Southern Democrat from Tennessee who remained loyal to the union, and chosen for his appeal to Southern Unionists. After being appointed Collector of the Port of Boston, Hamlin was elected to two more terms in the Senate, and finally served as U.S. Minister to Spain before retiring in 1882.

== Early life ==
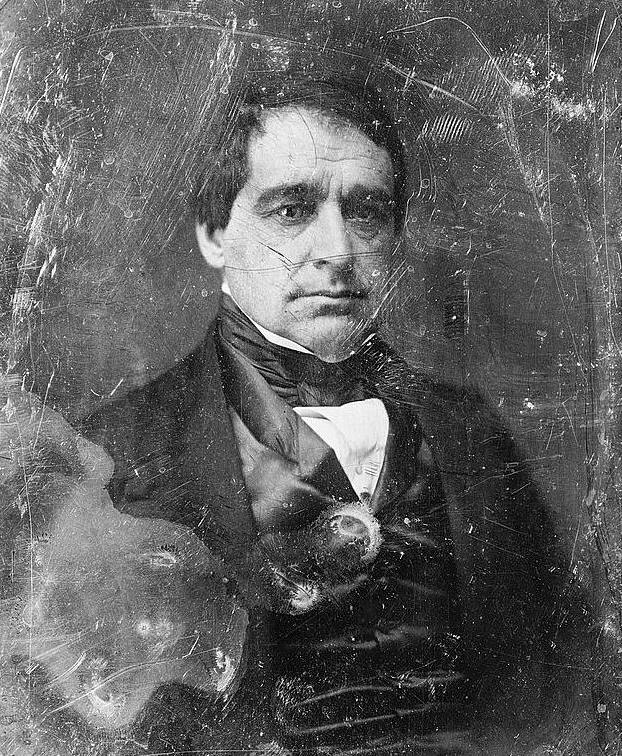
Hamlin c. late 1840s

Hamlin was born to Cyrus Hamlin and Anna (née Livermore) in Paris (now in Maine, then a part of Massachusetts). He was a sixth-generation descendant of English colonist James Hamlin, who had settled in Barnstable, part of the Plymouth Colony in 1639. He was a grandnephew of U.S. Senator Samuel Livermore II of New Hampshire.

According to folklore, Hamlin's life was saved when he was an infant by a Native American medicine woman named Molly Ockett. Hamlin was gravely ill, and Ockett prescribed that he be given warm cow's milk, after which he recovered.

Hamlin attended the district schools and Hebron Academy and later managed his father's farm. From 1827 to 1830 he published the Oxford Jeffersonian newspaper in partnership with Horatio King.

He studied law with the firm headed by Samuel Fessenden, was admitted to the bar in 1833, and began practicing in Hampden, Maine, where he lived until 1848.

== Personal life ==
Hamlin married Sarah Jane Emery of Paris Hill in 1833. Her father was Stephen Emery, who was appointed as Maine's Attorney General from 1839 to 1840. Hamlin and Sarah had four children: George, Charles, Cyrus, and Sarah.

His wife died in 1855. The next year, Hamlin married Sarah's half-sister, Ellen Vesta Emery. They had two children together: Hannibal E. and Frank. Ellen Hamlin died in 1925.

== Political beginnings ==
Hamlin's political career began in 1835 when he was elected to the Maine House of Representatives. Appointed a Major on the staff of Governor John Fairfield, he served with the militia in the bloodless Aroostook War of 1839. He facilitated negotiations between Fairfield and Lieutenant Governor John Harvey of New Brunswick, which helped reduce tensions and make possible the Webster–Ashburton Treaty, which ended the war.

Hamlin unsuccessfully ran for the United States House of Representatives in 1840 and left the State House in 1841. He was later elected to two terms in the United States House of Representatives, serving from 1843 to 1847. He was elected by the state legislature to fill a U.S. Senate vacancy in 1848 and to a full term in 1851. A Democrat at the beginning of his career, Hamlin supported the presidential candidacy of Franklin Pierce in 1852.

From the very beginning of his service in Congress, Hamlin was a prominent opponent of the extension of slavery. He was a conspicuous supporter of the Wilmot Proviso and spoke against the Compromise of 1850. In 1854, Hamlin strongly opposed the passage of the Kansas–Nebraska Act, which repealed the Missouri Compromise. After the Democratic Party endorsed that repeal at the 1856 Democratic National Convention, on June 12, 1856, he withdrew from the Democratic Party and joined the newly organized Republican Party, causing a national sensation.

The Republicans nominated Hamlin for governor of Maine the same year. He won the election by a large margin and was inaugurated on January 8, 1857. In the latter part of February 1857, however, he resigned the governorship. He returned to the United States Senate, serving from 1857 to January 1861.

== Vice presidency (1861–1865) ==
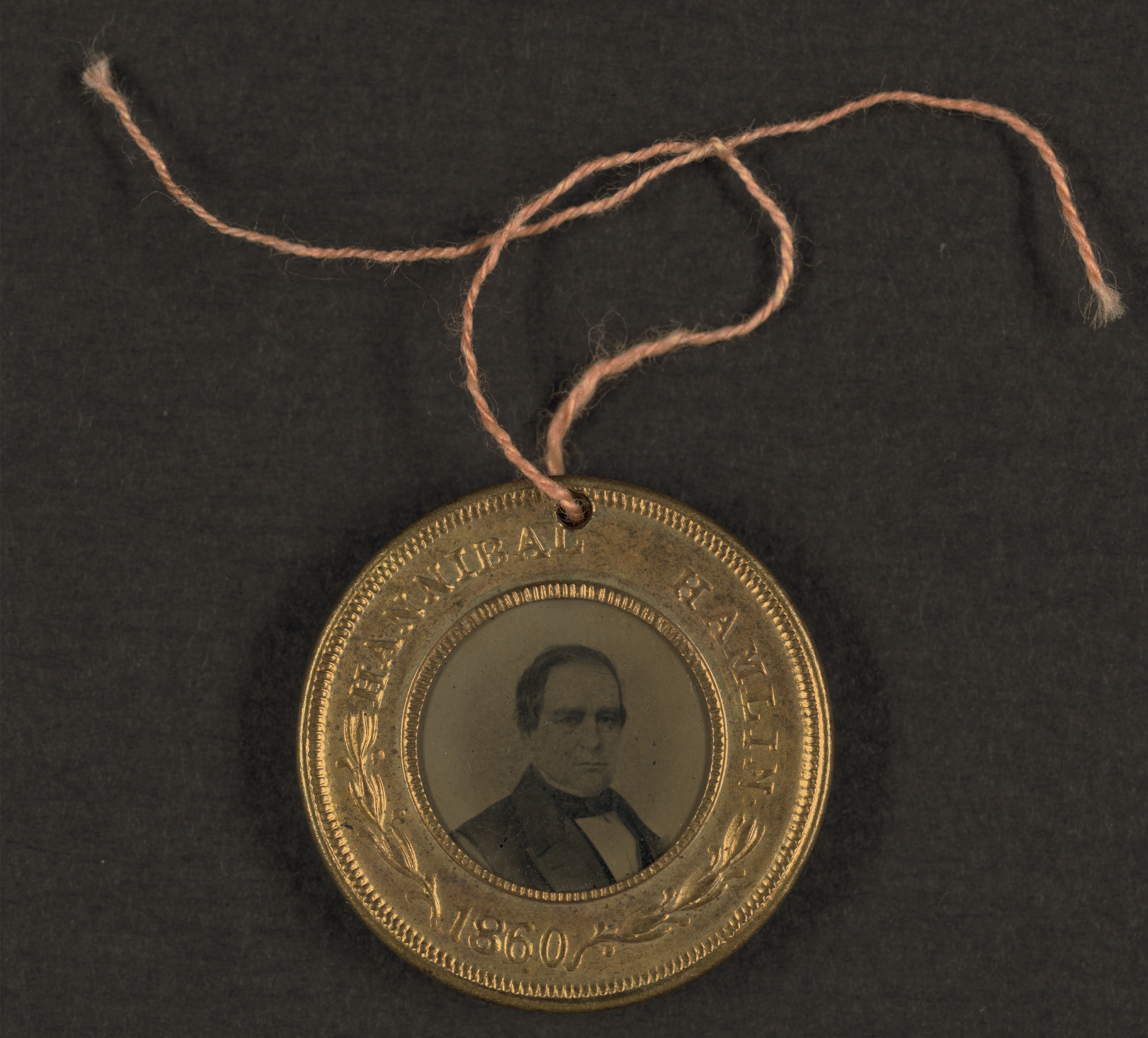
1860 election campaign button for Abraham Lincoln and Hannibal Hamlin. The other side of the button has Lincoln's portrait.

Hamlin was nominated by the Republican Party for Vice President of the United States in the 1860 presidential election on a ticket with former Representative Abraham Lincoln, the presidential nominee. Given that Lincoln was a former Whig from Illinois, a former Democrat from Maine as the vice presidential nominee helped to balance the ticket. Hamlin could also persuade other anti-slavery Democrats that joining the Republican Party was the only way to ensure slavery's demise.

Hamlin and Lincoln were not close personally, but had a good working relationship. At the time, the vice president was part of the legislative branch in his role as president of the Senate and did not attend cabinet meetings; Hamlin did not regularly visit the White House. Mary Todd Lincoln and Hamlin disliked each other. For his part, Hamlin complained, "I am only a fifth wheel of a coach and can do little for my friends."

He had little influence in the Lincoln administration, although he urged both the Emancipation Proclamation and the arming of Black Americans. He strongly supported the appointment of Joseph Hooker as commander of the Army of the Potomac, which failed at the Battle of Chancellorsville.

Beginning in 1860, Hamlin was a member of Company A of the Maine State Guard, a militia unit. When the company was called up in the summer of 1864, militia leaders informed Hamlin that because of his position as vice president, he did not have to take part in the muster. He opted to serve, arguing that he could set an example by doing the duty expected of any citizen, and the only concession made because of his office was that he was quartered with the officers. He reported to Fort McClary, in Kittery, in July, initially taking part in routine assignments including guard duty, and later taking over as company cook. He was promoted to corporal during his service and mustered out with the rest of his unit in mid-September.

In 1862, Hamlin presided over the impeachment trial in the Senate of Judge West Hughes Humphreys.

In June 1864, the Republicans and War Democrats joined to form the National Union Party. Although Lincoln was renominated, War Democrat Andrew Johnson of Tennessee was named to replace Hamlin as Lincoln's running mate. Lincoln was seeking to broaden his base of support and was also looking ahead to Southern Reconstruction, at which Johnson had proven himself adept as military governor of occupied Tennessee. Hamlin, by contrast, was an ally of the Northern "Radical Republicans" (who later impeached Johnson). Lincoln and Johnson were elected in November 1864, and Hamlin's term expired on March 4, 1865. Hamlin swore Johnson in as vice president, and was a witness to Johnson's incoherent inaugural speech.

Although Hamlin narrowly missed becoming president, his vice presidency ushered in a half-century of sustained national influence for the Maine Republican Party. In the period 1861–1911, Maine Republicans occupied the offices of vice president, Secretary of the Treasury (twice), Secretary of State, President pro tempore of the United States Senate, and Speaker of the United States House of Representatives (twice), and fielded a presidential nominee in James G. Blaine, a level of influence in national politics unmatched by subsequent Maine political delegations.

== Post-vice presidency (1865–1891) ==
After leaving the vice presidency, Hamlin served briefly as Collector of the Port of Boston. Appointed to the post by Johnson, he resigned in protest over Johnson's Reconstruction policy and accompanying efforts to build a political following loyal to him after he had been repudiated by the Republicans. Republicans had supported Johnson as part of the National Union ticket during the war, but opposed him after he became president and his position on Reconstruction deviated from theirs.

Not content with private life, Hamlin returned to the U.S. Senate in 1869 to serve two more terms before declining to run for reelection in 1880 because of an ailing heart. His last duty as a public servant came in 1881 when Secretary of State James G. Blaine convinced President James A. Garfield to name Hamlin as United States Ambassador to Spain. Hamlin received the appointment on June 30, 1881, and held the post until October 17, 1882.

Upon returning from Spain, Hamlin retired from public life to his home in Bangor, Maine, which he had purchased in 1851. The Hannibal Hamlin House—as it is known today—is in central Bangor at 15 5th Street. Incorporating Victorian, Italianate, and Mansard-style architecture, the mansion was posted to the National Register of Historic Places in 1979.

On October 4, 1865, Hamlin was elected as a Third Class Companion in the Pennsylvania Commandery of the Military Order of the Loyal Legion of the United States (MOLLUS). Third Class was the MOLLUS division created to recognize civilians who had contributed outstanding service to the Union during the war. He was assigned MOLLUS insignia number 47.

== Death ==
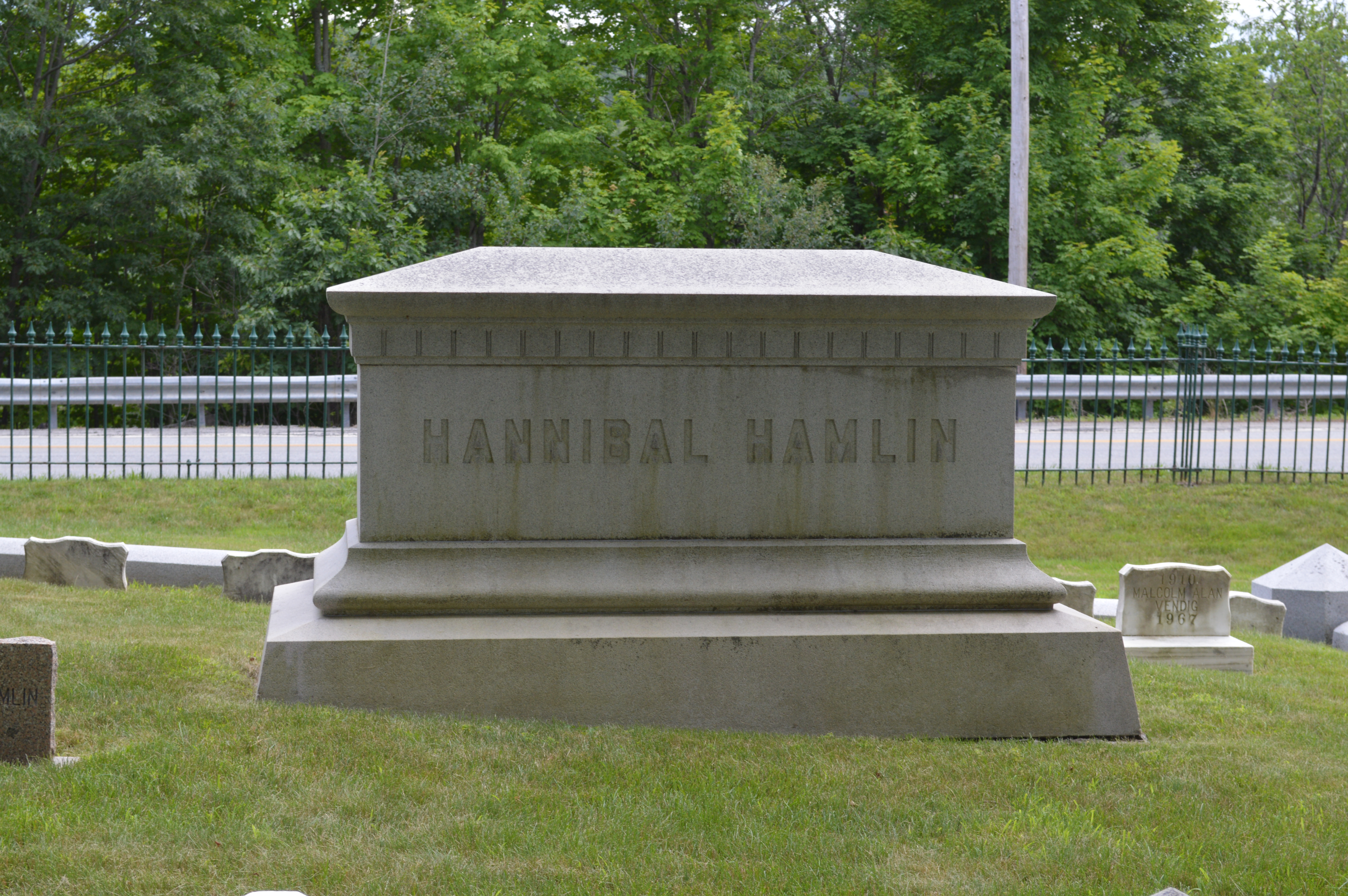
Hamlin's grave

On July 4, 1891, Hamlin collapsed and fell unconscious while playing cards at the Tarratine Club he founded in downtown Bangor, and died there a few hours later, at the age of 81. He was buried in the Hamlin family plot at Mount Hope Cemetery in Bangor. He outlived six of his successors in the vice presidency (Andrew Johnson, Schuyler Colfax, Henry Wilson, William A. Wheeler, Chester A. Arthur, and Thomas A. Hendricks), more than any other U.S. vice president. Following John Adams and Thomas Jefferson, he was also the third American Vice President to die on Independence Day.

He is buried in the Mount Hope Cemetery in Bangor, Maine.

== Family ==
Hamlin had four sons and one daughter who grew to adulthood: Charles, Cyrus, Hannibal Emery, Frank, and Sarah. Charles and Cyrus served in the Union forces during the Civil War, both becoming generals, Charles by brevet. Cyrus was among the first Union officers to argue for the enlistment of black troops and commanded a brigade of freedmen in the Siege of Port Hudson. Charles and Sarah were present at Ford's Theater the night of Lincoln's assassination. Hannibal Emery Hamlin was Maine Attorney General from 1905 to 1908. Hannibal Hamlin's great-granddaughter Sally Hamlin was a child actor who made many spoken word recordings for the Victor Talking Machine Company in the early 20th century.

Hannibal's older brother, Elijah Livermore Hamlin, was president of the Mutual Fire Insurance Co. of Bangor and the Bangor Institution for Savings. He was twice an unsuccessful candidate for governor of Maine in the late 1840s and served as mayor of Bangor in 1851–1852. The brothers were members of different political parties (Hannibal a Democrat, and Elijah a Whig) before both became Republicans in the late 1850s.

Hannibal's nephew (Elijah's son) Augustus Choate Hamlin was a physician, artist, mineralogist, author, and historian. He was also mayor of Bangor in 1877–1878, and a founding member of the Bangor Historical Society.

Augustus served as a surgeon in the 2nd Maine Volunteer Infantry Regiment during the Civil War, eventually becoming a U.S. Army Medical Inspector, and later the Surgeon General of Maine. He wrote books about Andersonville Prison and the Battle of Chancellorsville. Hannibal's grand-nephew (Elijah's grandson) Isaiah K. Stetson was Speaker of the Maine House of Representatives in 1899–1900, and owned a large company in Bangor that manufactured and shipped lumber and ice and ran a shipyard and marine railway.

Hannibal's first cousin Cyrus Hamlin, who was a graduate of the Bangor Theological Seminary, became a missionary in Turkey, where he founded Robert College. He later became president of Middlebury College in Vermont. His son, A. D. F. Hamlin, Hannibal's first cousin once removed, became a professor of architecture at Columbia University and a noted architectural historian. There are biographies of Hamlin by his grandson Charles E. Hamlin (1899, reprinted 1971) and by H. Draper Hunt (1969).

== Honors and legacy ==
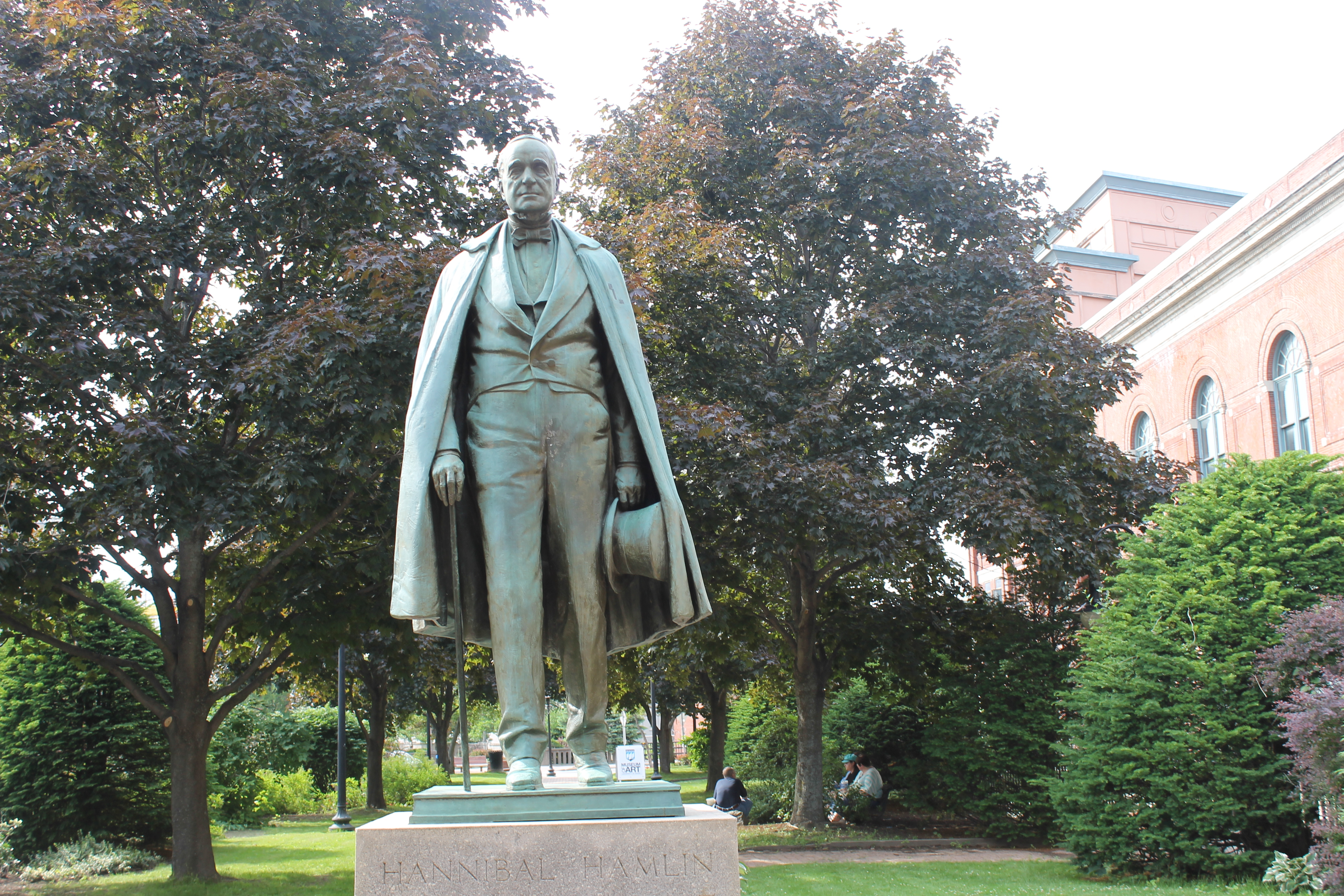
Sculptor Charles Tefft of Brewer, Maine, created this bronze statue of Hannibal Hamlin, which was dedicated in 1927 in downtown Bangor.

Hamlin County, South Dakota is named in his honor, as are Hamlin, Kansas; Hamlin, New York; Hamlin, West Virginia; Hamlin Township; Hamlin Lake in Mason County, Michigan; Hamlin Peak, a mountain in Piscataquis County, Maine; and Hamlin, a small Maine village that is a U.S.–Canada border crossing with Grand Falls, New Brunswick. There are statues in Hamlin's likeness in the United States Capitol and a public park (Norumbega Mall) in Bangor, Maine.

There is also a building on the University of Maine Campus, in Orono, named Hannibal Hamlin Hall. A fire broke out there on February 13, 1944, in which two students died and one was severely injured. The building was later rebuilt. Hannibal Hamlin Memorial Library is next to his birthplace in Paris, Maine.

The Hampden Maine Historical Society exhibits a restoration of his first law office at its Kinsley House Museum grounds.

Hamlin's house in Bangor subsequently housed the presidents of the adjacent Bangor Theological Seminary. It is listed on the National Register of Historic Places, as is Hamlin's birthplace in Paris, Maine (as part of the Paris Hill Historic District).

Hamlin Park in Chicago is named in his honor.

== In popular culture ==
Hamlin appears briefly in three alternate history writings by Harry Turtledove: The Guns of the South, Must and Shall, and How Few Remain.

In Fallout 3, a 2008 action role-playing game, a quest called "Head of State" involves returning the Lincoln Memorial statue's head to its pedestal. The leader of the group trying to return the head is named Hannibal Hamlin.

== See also ==
- List of American politicians who switched parties in office
- Statue of Hannibal Hamlin

U.S. House of Representatives
Preceded by Alfred Marshall	Member from Maine's 6th congressional district 1843–1847	Succeeded by James S. Wiley
U.S. Senate
Preceded by Wyman B. S. Moor	U.S. Senator (Class 1) from Maine; 1848–1857; Served alongside: James W. Bradbury, William P. Fessenden	Succeeded by Amos Nourse
Preceded by Amos Nourse	U.S. Senator (Class 1) from Maine; 1857–1861; Served alongside: William P. Fessenden	Succeeded by Lot M. Morrill
Preceded by Lot M. Morrill	U.S. Senator (Class 1) from Maine; 1869–1881; Served alongside: William P. Fessenden, Lot M. Morrill, James G. Blaine	Succeeded by Eugene Hale
Party political offices
Preceded by Anson Morrill	Republican nominee for Governor of Maine; 1856	Succeeded by Lot M. Morrill
Preceded by William L. Dayton	Republican nominee for Vice President of the United States; 1860	Succeeded by Andrew Johnson^{1}
Political offices
Preceded by Samuel Wells	Governor of Maine; 1857	Succeeded by Joseph H. Williams
Preceded by John C. Breckinridge	Vice President of the United States; 1861–1865	Succeeded by Andrew Johnson
Diplomatic posts
Preceded by Lucius Fairchild	United States Minister to Spain; 1881–1882	Succeeded by John W. Foster
Notes and references
1. Lincoln and Johnson ran on the National Union ticket in 1864.
