= Charles Hamlin (general) =

American general and politician

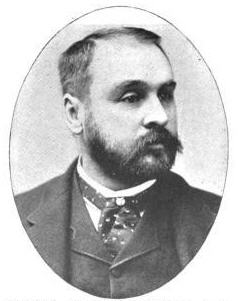
- Charles Hamlin

49th Speaker of the Maine House of Representatives
- In office January 7, 1885 – January 5, 1887
- Preceded by: J. Manchester Haynes
- Succeeded by: Charles E. Littlefield

Member of the Maine House of Representatives from Bangor
- In office January 3, 1883 – January 5, 1887

Personal details
- Born: September 13, 1837 Hampden, Maine, U.S.
- Died: May 15, 1911 (aged 73) Bangor, Maine, U.S.
- Resting place: Mount Hope Cemetery
- Party: Republican
- Parents: Hannibal Hamlin; Sarah Emery Hamlin
- Relatives: Cyrus Hamlin (brother)
- Education: Bowdoin College (BA); Harvard University (LLB)

Military service
- Allegiance: United States
- Branch/service: Union Army
- Years of service: 1861–1865
- Rank: Major; Brevet Brigadier General
- Unit: 1st Maine Heavy Artillery Regiment
- Battles/wars: American Civil War

Charles Hamlin (September 13, 1837 – May 15, 1911), from Bangor, Maine, was an attorney and a Union Army officer during the American Civil War, attaining the rank of major. He was nominated for appointment to the grade of brevet brigadier general of volunteers by President Andrew Johnson on January 13, 1866, to rank from March 13, 1865, and the United States Senate confirmed the appointment on March 12, 1866. He was one of the sons of Vice President Hannibal Hamlin and a brother to Cyrus Hamlin, a Union Army brigadier general.

== Biography ==
Hamlin was born in Hampden, Maine, and graduated from Bowdoin College in 1857. During the American Civil War, Hamlin served in the Union Army as a major, and was awarded the honorary rank of brevet brigadier general United States Volunteers, to rank from March 13, 1865, by U.S. Senate confirmation on March 12, 1866.

Hamlin began his military career as a major in the 1st Maine Heavy Artillery Regiment. He gained a staff position as major and assistant adjutant general in the Army of the Potomac. He fought in the Battle of Gettysburg among other engagements. Hamlin served as assistant adjutant general on the staffs of Generals Hiram G. Berry and Albion P. Howe. While serving under Gen. Howe in Washington, Hamlin was in the audience at Ford's Theatre when President Lincoln was assassinated. Hamlin was mustered out of the U.S. Volunteers on September 14, 1865. On January 13, 1866, Hamlin was nominated by President Andrew Johnson for the award of the honorary grade of brevet brigadier general United States Volunteers, to rank from March 13, 1865 for faithful and meritorious services The U.S. Senate confirmed the award on March 12, 1866.

Along with his sister Sarah, Hamlin was at Ford's Theater on the night of the Lincoln assassination.

After the war, Hamlin became a companion of the Military Order of the Loyal Legion of the United States.

A lawyer in civilian life, Hamlin returned to his home in Bangor, Maine after the war. He became the City Solicitor of Bangor in 1867. In 1883 and 1885 he was elected to successive terms in the Maine House of Representatives, becoming its Speaker in his second term. He also served as president of the Eastern Maine General Hospital (now the Eastern Maine Medical Center).

== See also ==
- List of American Civil War brevet generals (Union)
