= Mount Hope Cemetery (Bangor, Maine) =

- Mount Hope Cemetery District
- U.S. National Register of Historic Places
- U.S. Historic district
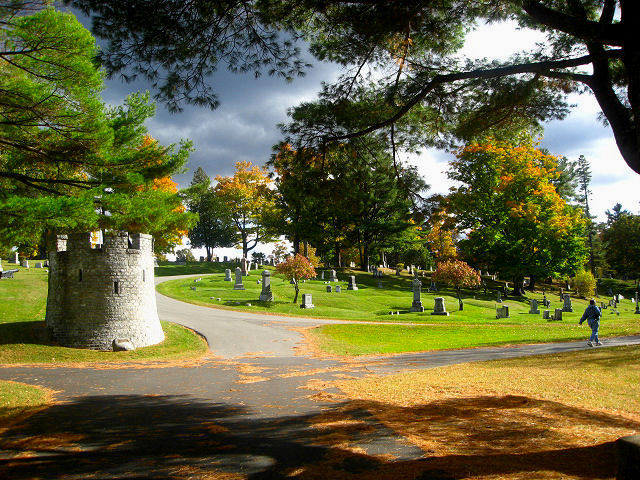
- A view of Mount Hope Cemetery

- Location within Maine Location within the United States
- Location: U.S. 2, Bangor, Maine
- Coordinates: 44°49′29″N 68°43′28″W
- Built: 1834
- Architect: Bryant, Charles G.; Mansur, Wilfred E.
- Architectural style: Greek Revival, Late Victorian, English Half-Timbered style
- NRHP reference No.: 74000187
- Added to NRHP: December 04, 1974

Mount Hope Cemetery in Bangor, Maine, is the second oldest garden cemetery in the United States. It was designed by architect Charles G. Bryant in 1834 and built by the Bangor Horticultural Society soon after, the same year that Bangor was incorporated as a city. The cemetery was modeled after Mount Auburn Cemetery (1831) in Boston, Massachusetts. Bangor was at that time a frontier boom-town, and much of its architecture and landscaping was modeled after that of Boston. The site has been listed on the National Register of Historic Places.

== History ==
Purchased in July 1834, the land consisted of 50-acre (20 ha) of Lot 27, which was set along State Street – at the time known as County Road and later the "Road to Orono" – and the Penobscot River. It did not include all of the cemetery's central hill; instead, it cut across the crest of the hill and met up with what would later be Mount Hope Avenue. The land was approximately 660 by 3,300 feet (200 by 1,010 m) with the longer side extending north–south along State Street. Approximately 12-acre (4.9 ha) was to be set aside for horticultural activities, and the rest of the land was to be used as a cemetery.

This was the preferred resting ground for Bangor's 19th- and early-20th-century elite. The cemetery includes the gravesites of Hannibal Hamlin, a U.S. Vice President who had also held office as Congressman, US Senator and Governor of Maine, a U.S. Senator, (Note: Arthur R. Gould) ten U.S. Congressmen, (Note: Including John A. Peters, Samuel F. Hersey, George W. Ladd, Charles Stetson, Francis Carr, Charles A. Boutelle, Harris M. Plaisted, John G. Utterback, and Samuel Thatcher) two U.S. Ambassadors, four Governors of Maine, (Note: William D. Williamson, Harris M. Plaisted, Frederick W. Plaisted, and Israel Washburn Jr.) eight Civil War Generals, (Note: John F. Appleton, Charles Hamlin, Cyrus Hamlin, Daniel Chaplin, Harris M. Plaisted, Charles W. Roberts, George Varney, and Daniel White) and numerous "lumber barons" and other local businessmen and politicians. Actors Richard Golden and Ralph Sipperly are also buried there.

== Representation in other media ==
The movie Pet Sematary was filmed in Mount Hope Cemetery.

== Notable burials ==
- Franklin Muzzy (1806–1873), 32nd President of the Maine Senate
- Hannibal Hamlin (1809–1891), 15th Vice President of the United States, 26th Governor of Maine
- Ellen Hamlin (1835-1925), 2nd wife of Hannibal Hamlin, Second Lady of the United States
- Al Brady (1910–1937), Bank robber
- Doris Pike White (1896–1987), 24th President General of the Daughters of the American Revolution
- Ralph Sipperly (1890–1928), silent film actor

== See also ==
- National Register of Historic Places listings in Penobscot County, Maine
- List of burial places of presidents and vice presidents of the United States
