= Hannibal Hamlin House =

Historic house in Maine, United States

- U.S. National Register of Historic Places
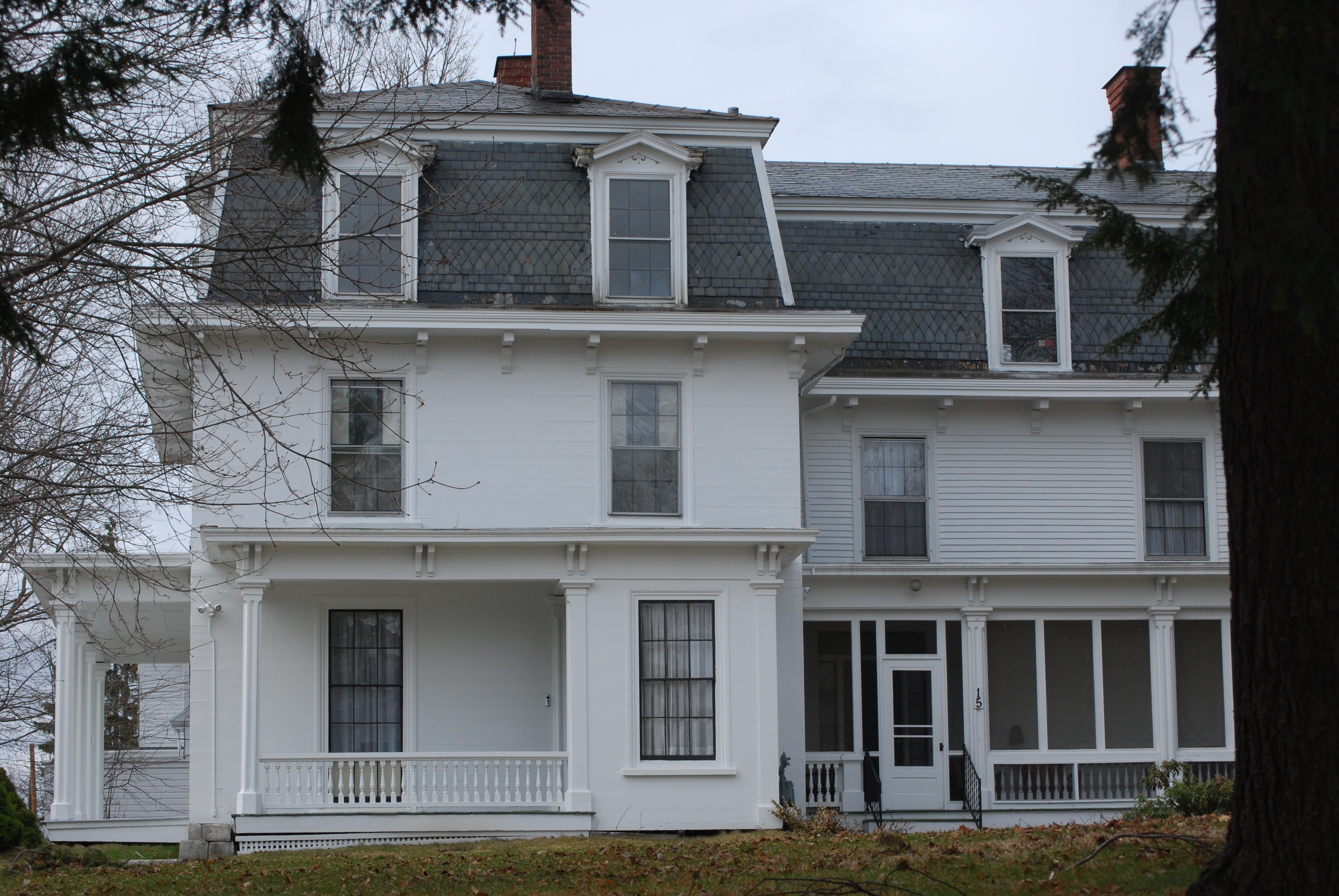

- Location within Maine Location within the United States
- Location: 15 5th St., Bangor, Maine
- Coordinates: 44.8007°N 68.7801°W
- Area: 0.3 acres (0.12 ha)
- Built: 1848
- Architectural style: Italianate, Mansard
- NRHP reference No.: 79000160
- Added to NRHP: October 9, 1979

The Hannibal Hamlin House is a historic house at 15 5th Street in Bangor, Maine. Built c. 1848–51, this well-preserved Italianate house was the home of U.S. Vice President Hannibal Hamlin from 1862 until his death in 1891. From 1933 until 2007 it served as the official residence of the president of Bangor Theological Seminary. It was listed on the National Register of Historic Places in 1979.

== Description and history ==
The Hamlin House is located on the northwest side of 5th Street, just south of Hammond Street in a residential area west of Bangor's downtown area. It is a 2 1/2-story wood-frame structure, with a mansard roof (a later addition) that provides for a full third floor. The front portion of the house has flushboard siding, while the rear ell is clapboarded. The roof is composed of decoratively cut slate shingles, and has paired brackets in the eaves. The street-facing facade is two bays wide, with a hip-roof porch extending across its width, supported by square posts with paired brackets at the top. The main entrance is on the northeast side, under a similar porch with a projecting vestibule.

The house was built sometime between 1848 and 1851 by William T. Hilliard, a clerk of the local court and deputy collector of customs. It was purchased in 1862 by Hannibal Hamlin, during his single term as Vice President of the United States under Abraham Lincoln. Hamlin made this house his home until his death in 1891, adding the mansard roof and third story in 1870. Hamlin was from 1836 to his death a major figure in Maine politics, serving the state legislature, the United States Congress (both House and Senate), as first a Democrat and from 1856, as a Republican. He also briefly served as Governor of Maine in 1857.

In 1933 Hamlin's son donated the house to the Bangor Theological Seminary, which used it for many years as the official residence of its president. The house was sold (along with the rest of the seminary campus) to developers in 2007.

== See also ==
- National Register of Historic Places listings in Penobscot County, Maine
