= Nordhouse Dunes Wilderness =

Wilderness area in Michigan, US

- IUCN category Ib (wilderness area)
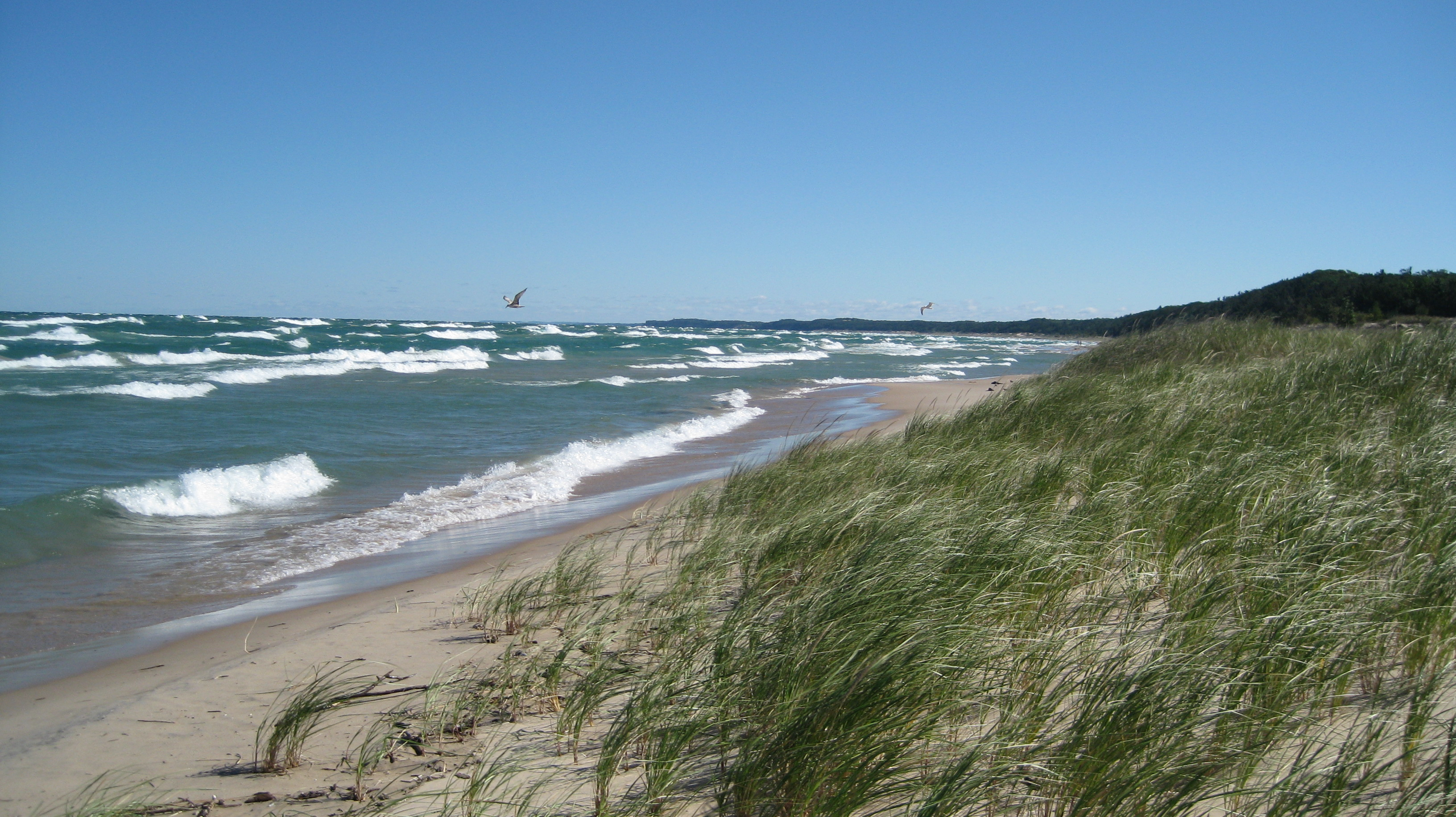

- Location within Michigan
- Location: Mason County, Michigan, United States
- Nearest city: Ludington, Michigan
- Coordinates: 44°05′05″N 86°23′47″W
- Area: 3,450 acres (14 km^{2})
- Established: 1987
- Governing body: U.S. Forest Service

The Nordhouse Dunes Wilderness is a 3,450-acre (14.0 km^{2}) listed wilderness area within the Manistee National Forest. It is located north of Ludington, Michigan, and is best known for its 4 miles (6.4 km) of undeveloped Lake Michigan shoreline.

== Geology ==
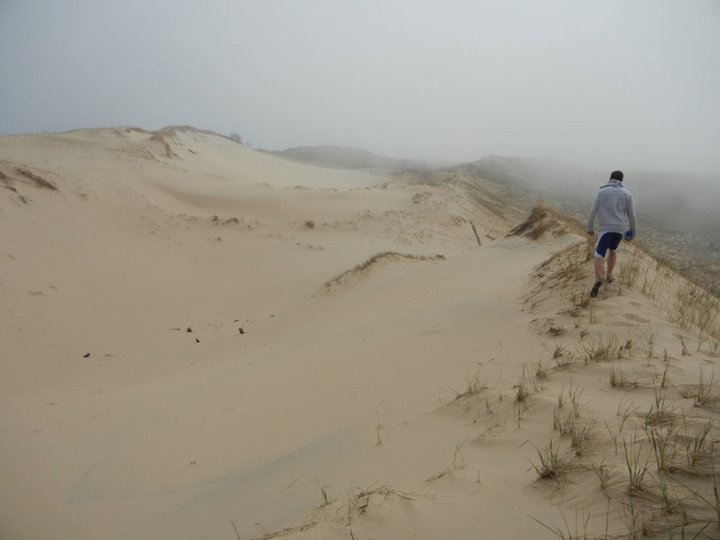
Nordhouse Dunes in Manistee National Forest

The lake levels of the upper Great Lakes have fluctuated sharply over the past 4,000 years, with a temporary high-water mark, the Nipssing stage, achieved about 3,500 years before the present. During the Nipissing stage, Lake Huron and Lake Michigan were interconnected as they are today, but the two lakes brimmed over with fresh water 605 feet (184 m) above sea level. As the lakes fell back toward their current level of 580 feet (177 m) above sea level, large quantities of sand were exposed. Subsequent work by lake-effect winds shaped this exposed sand into sand dunes.

The Lake Michigan sand-dune shoreline around Big Sable Point was reshaped into the Big Sable Dunes complex, a 6,270-acre (25.4 km^{2}) area of sandy hills, dunal moraines, shallow lakes, and associated plant and animal life. The dunes reach heights of 140 feet (42 m) above lake level.

The Nordhouse Dunes form the northern half of the preserved section of the Big Sable Dunes complex. The southern 2,820 acres (11.4 km^{2}) are contained within Michigan's Ludington State Park.

== Biology ==
The older Nordhouse Dunes, farther away from Lake Michigan, have had time for the process of plant succession to produce a forest ecosystem. The local climate supports beech, sugar maple, red oak, and white oak trees, mixed with a thin sprinkling of evergreens such as the red pine and Michigan's state tree, the white pine.

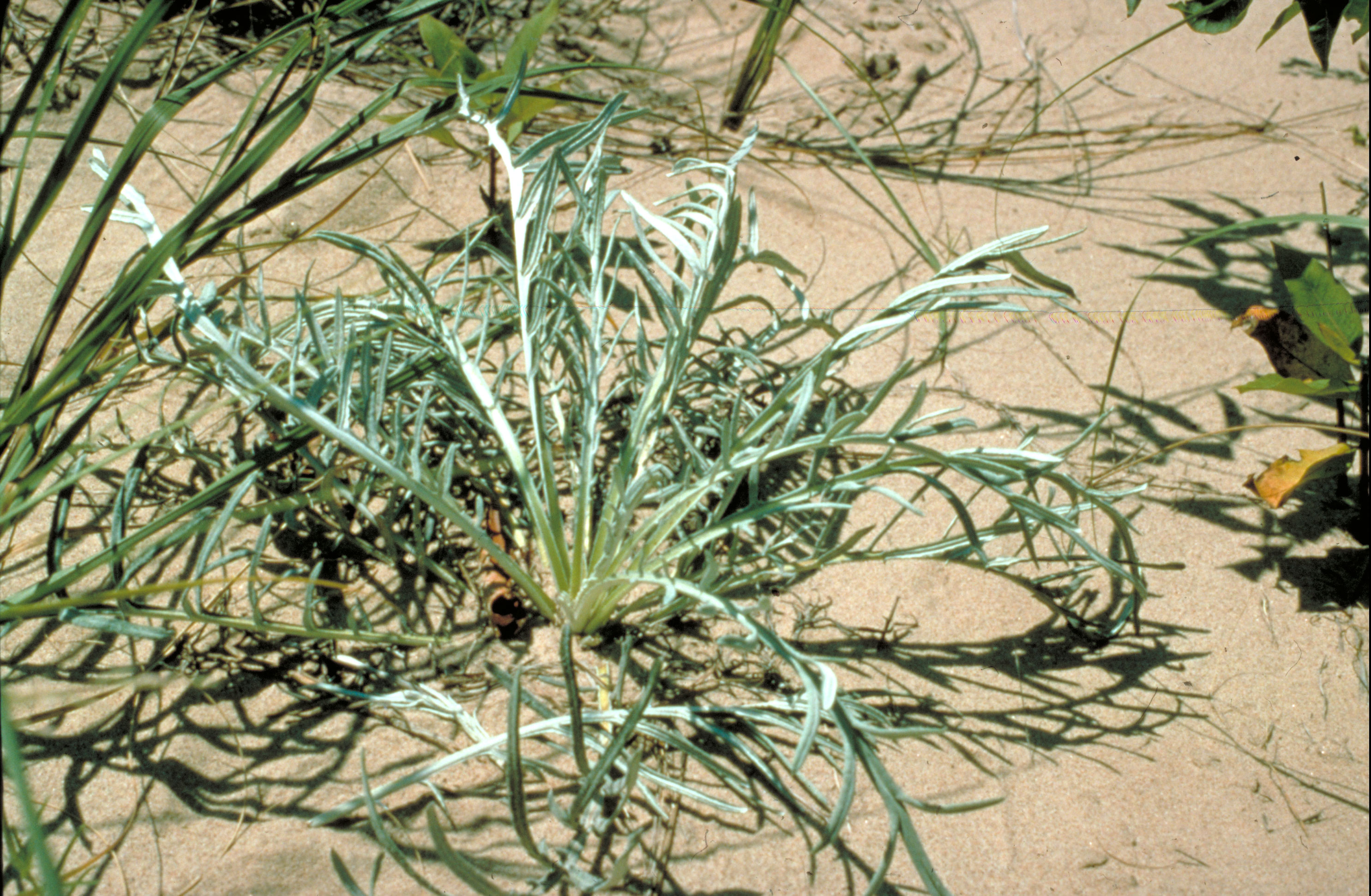
Pitcher's Thistle (Cirsium pitcheri) on beach

Active dune areas closer to the lake are dotted with early-succession plants and trees such as the juniper bush and the jack pine. Of special interest is one of the two largest known remaining populations of the Pitcher's thistle, a threatened species listed by the U.S. Fish and Wildlife Service. 3,100 Nordhouse thistle plants of this species were inventoried in a 1991 counting exercise.

In animal life, the primary browser is the familiar whitetail deer, mixed with typical examples of Michigan small game such as the coyote, fox, porcupine, badger and raccoon. Other animals present but rarely seen by casual visitors include black bear and bobcat.

== Nordhouse Dunes today ==
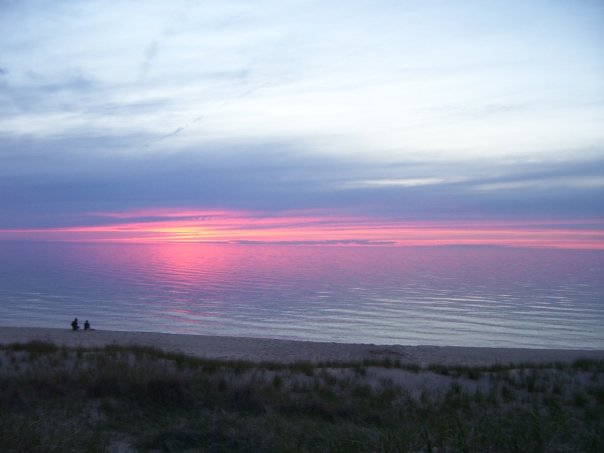
Sunset at Nordhouse Dunes

After northwestern Michigan was heavily logged in the 19th century and early 20th century, the U.S. Congress re-designated much of the cutover land as the Manistee National Forest in 1938. Congress designated the Nordhouse Dunes as a wilderness in 1987.

Two parking lots are located at Lake Michigan Recreation Area on the wilderness's northern edge and Nurnberg Road at its southeastern corner. While the wilderness nominally enjoys free admission, vehicles using the parking lots are required to have a vehicle pass displayed on the windshield.

Both parking lots are located relatively close to U.S. Highway 31, the primary road serving the Lake Michigan shoreline north of Ludington.
