= Cyrus Hamlin (general) =

American attorney, politician, and general

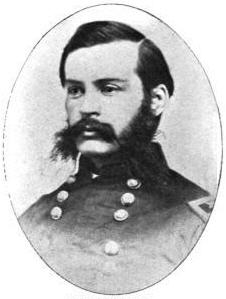
- Cyrus Hamlin
- Born: April 26, 1839; Hampden, Maine
- Died: August 28, 1867 (aged 28); New Orleans, Louisiana
- Burial place: Mount Hope Cemetery, Bangor, Maine, U.S.
- Relatives: Hannibal Hamlin (father); Charles Hamlin (brother)
- Military career
- Allegiance: United States; Union
- Branch: United States Army; Union Army
- Service years: 1862 - 1866
- Rank: Brigadier General; Brevet Major General
- Conflicts: American Civil War

Cyrus Hamlin (April 26, 1839 – August 28, 1867) was an attorney, politician, and general from Hampden, Maine, who served in the Union Army during the American Civil War.

== Early life ==
Hamlin was born in Hampden, Maine, a suburb of Bangor. He was the third son of Hannibal Hamlin, the Vice President of the United States, and his first wife, Sarah Emery. His brother, Charles Hamlin, was a Union Army major who was appointed a brevet brigadier general at the end of the war.

Hamlin was educated at Hampden Academy and studied at Waterville College (now Colby College) in Waterville, Maine. He was admitted to the bar in 1860 and practiced law for a year in Kittery, Maine.

== Civil War ==
Hamlin was commissioned as a captain in the Union Army in April 1862, serving as an aide-de-camp to Maj. Gen. John C. Frémont.

Hamlin was among the first to advocate for enlisting African-American troops in the Union Army. In February 1863, he was appointed the first colonel of the 80th United States Colored Troops and was assigned to field duty in Louisiana. There he eventually took charge of a brigade of black troops and participated in the Siege of Port Hudson. He was promoted to brigadier general in December 1864 and assigned command of the military district of Port Hudson, Louisiana, Department of the Gulf. Hamlin was mustered out of the United States Volunteers on January 15, 1866.

On February 21, 1866, President Andrew Johnson nominated Hamlin for the award of the honorary grade of brevet major general, U.S. Volunteers, to rank from March 13, 1865, and the U.S. Senate confirmed the award on April 26, 1866.

Hamlin was a Companion of the Military Order of the Loyal Legion of the United States.

== Postbellum life ==
Hamlin remained in Louisiana after the war during the early days of Reconstruction, but died of yellow fever in 1867. Although he was initially interred in the Girod Street Cemetery in New Orleans, Louisiana, he was reburied three months later in his family plot at Mount Hope Cemetery in Bangor, Maine.

== See also ==
- List of American Civil War generals (Union)
