= Amos Nourse =

American politician (1794–1877)

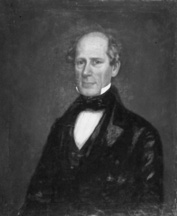

United States Senator from Maine
- In office January 16, 1857 – March 3, 1857
- Preceded by: Hannibal Hamlin
- Succeeded by: Hannibal Hamlin

Personal details
- Born: December 17, 1794 Bolton, Massachusetts
- Died: April 7, 1877 (aged 82) Bath, Maine
- Resting place: Hallowell Cemetery, Hallowell, Maine
- Party: Republican
- Education: Harvard University
- United States Congress. "Amos Nourse (id: N000162)". Biographical Directory of the United States Congress.

Amos Nourse (December 17, 1794 – April 7, 1877) was an American politician and medical doctor who was a U.S. Senator from Maine for 47 days in 1857.

== Biography ==
Born in Bolton, Massachusetts, he graduated from Harvard College in 1812 and from Harvard Medical School in 1817. At first settling in Wiscasset, and subsequently in Hallowell, Maine, he finally removed to Bath, Maine in 1845. He was collector of customs at Bath from 1845 and 1846 and commenced practice of medicine in that city. He was lecturer on obstetrics at Bowdoin College from 1846 to 1854, and professor of that branch from 1855 to 1866.

He was elected to the United States Senate as a Republican to fill the vacancy caused by the resignation of Hannibal Hamlin and served from January 16 to March 3, 1857. He then became judge of probate of Sagadahoc County, Maine in 1860.

He died at Bath in 1877 and is buried in Hallowell, Maine.

== Sources ==
U.S. Senate
Preceded by Hannibal Hamlin	U.S. senator (Class 1) from Maine; 1857; Served alongside: William P. Fessenden	Succeeded by Hannibal Hamlin
