= Hamlin Township, Mason County, Michigan =

Hamlin Township, Michigan
- Civil township
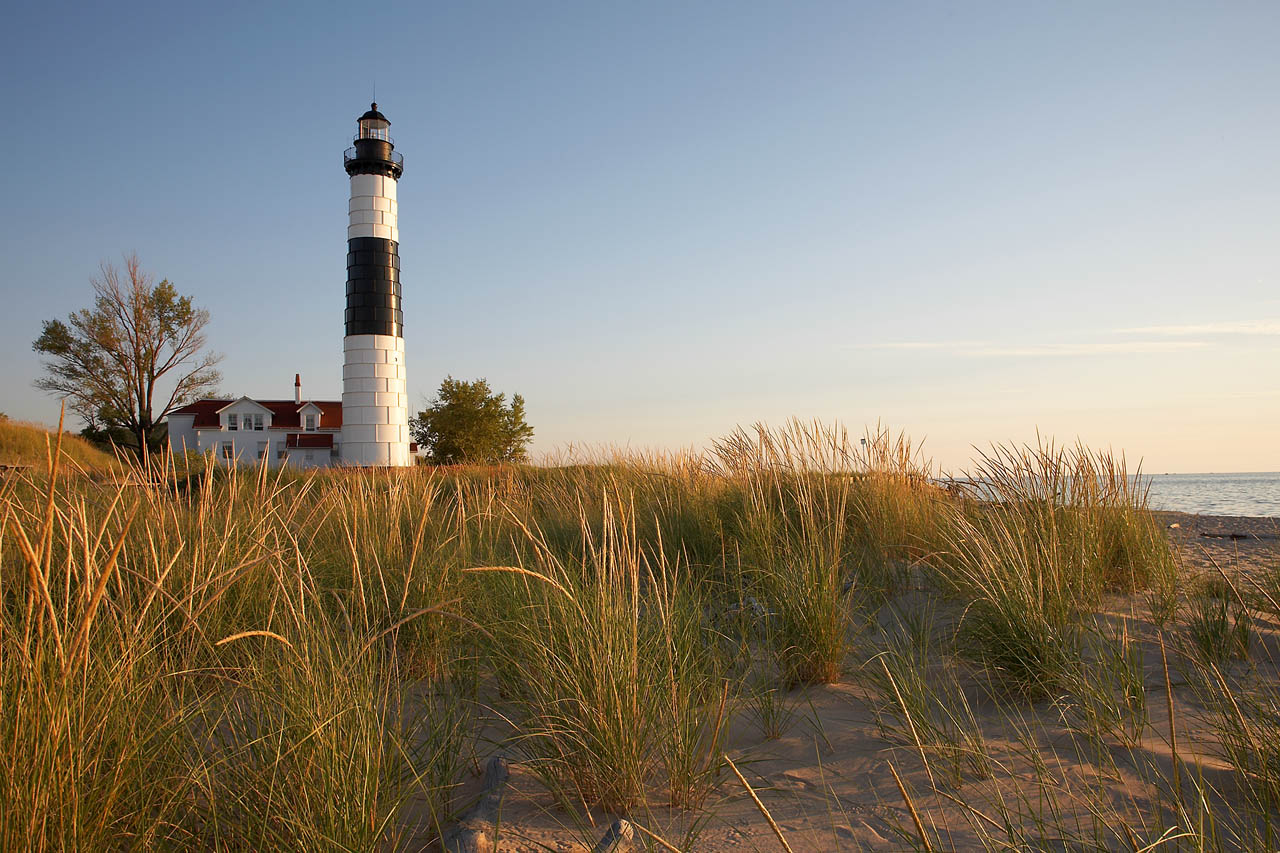
- Big Sable Point Light within Ludington State Park

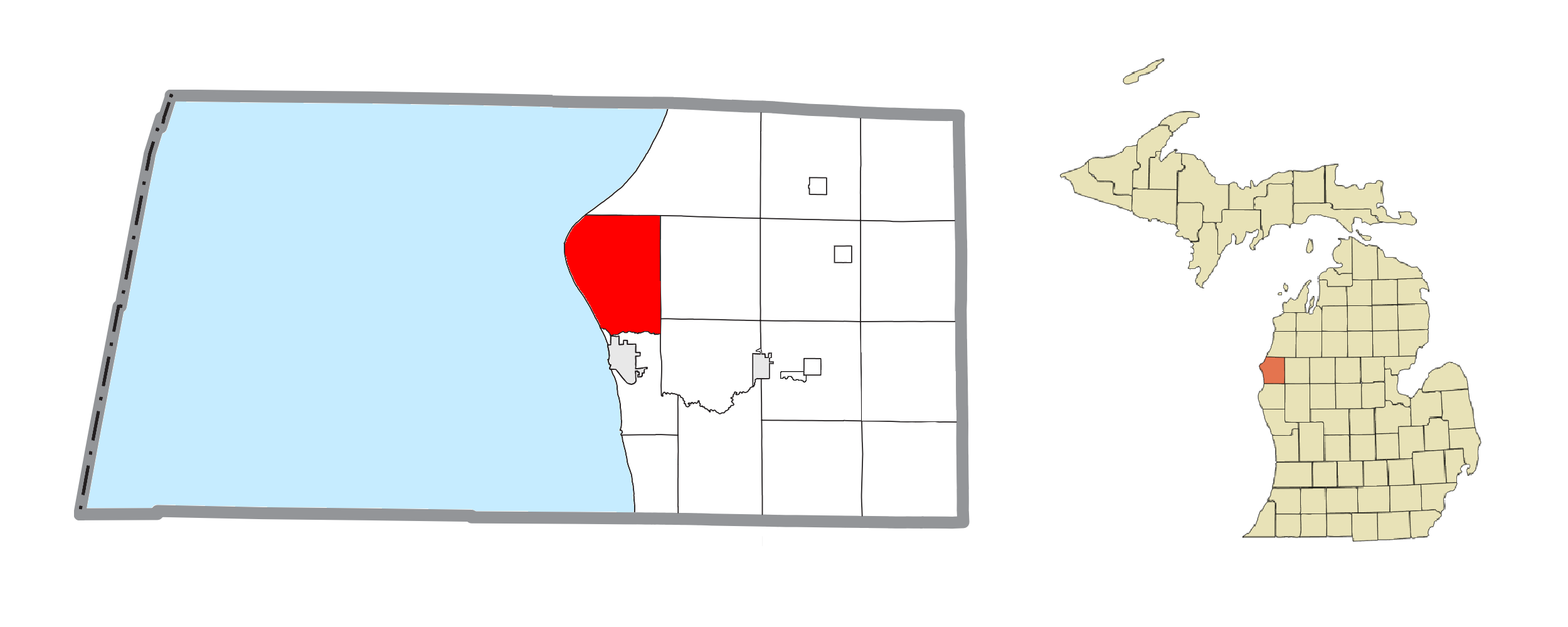
- Location within Mason County

- Location within Michigan Location within the United States
- Coordinates: 44°02′9″N 86°26′45″W
- Country: United States
- State: Michigan
- County: Mason
- Established: 1860

Government
  - Supervisor: Nancy Vandervest
  - Clerk: Catherine Lewis

Area
  - Total: 34.40 sq mi (89.1 km^{2})
  - Land: 27.45 sq mi (71.1 km^{2})
  - Water: 6.95 sq mi (18.0 km^{2})
- Elevation: 630 ft (192 m)

Population (2020)
  - Total: 3,711
  - Density: 135.2/sq mi (52.2/km^{2})
- Time zone: UTC-5 (Eastern (EST))
  - Summer (DST): UTC-4 (EDT)
- ZIP Codes: 49431 (Ludington); 49411 (Free Soil)
- Area code: 231
- FIPS code: 26-105-36220
- GNIS feature ID: 1626425
- Website: www.hamlintownship.org

Hamlin Township is a civil township of Mason County in the U.S. state of Michigan. The population was 3,711 at the 2020 census, up from 3,408 in 2010.

== History ==
Hamlin Township was organized in 1860. It was named in honor of Hannibal Hamlin, 15th vice president of the United States.

== Geography ==
The township is in western Mason County, sitting on the eastern shore of Lake Michigan. Hamlin Lake, a dammed lake on the Big Sable River, occupies a large portion of the township, and the Lincoln River forms the southern border of the township. Big Sable Point Light and Ludington State Park are located within the township along Lake Michigan. According to the United States Census Bureau, the township has a total area of 34.40 square miles (89.10 km^{2}), of which 27.45 square miles (71.10 km^{2}) are land and 6.95 square miles (18.00 km^{2}), or 20.21%, are water.

== Demographics ==
As of the census of 2000, there were 3,192 people, 1,343 households, and 992 families residing in the township. The population density was 116.1 inhabitants per square mile (44.8/km^{2}). There were 2,123 housing units at an average density of 77.2 per square mile (29.8/km^{2}). The racial makeup of the township was 97.43% White, 0.06% African American, 0.56% Native American, 0.22% Asian, 0.60% from other races, and 1.13% from two or more races. Hispanic or Latino of any race were 1.79% of the population.

There were 1,343 households, out of which 27.3% had children under the age of 18 living with them, 66.3% were married couples living together, 5.6% had a female householder with no husband present, and 26.1% were non-families. 22.4% of all households were made up of individuals, and 9.3% had someone living alone who was 65 years of age or older. The average household size was 2.38 and the average family size was 2.77.

In the township the population was spread out, with 21.7% under the age of 18, 4.9% from 18 to 24, 24.3% from 25 to 44, 31.7% from 45 to 64, and 17.3% who were 65 years of age or older. The median age was 44 years. For every 100 females, there were 100.3 males. For every 100 females age 18 and over, there were 100.0 males.

The median income for a household in the township was $41,594, and the median income for a family was $49,231. Males had a median income of $38,111 versus $24,750 for females. The per capita income for the township was $21,658. About 5.0% of families and 7.0% of the population were below the poverty line, including 10.3% of those under age 18 and 3.6% of those age 65 or over.
