= Hamlin Lake =

Lake in Mason County, Michigan, USA

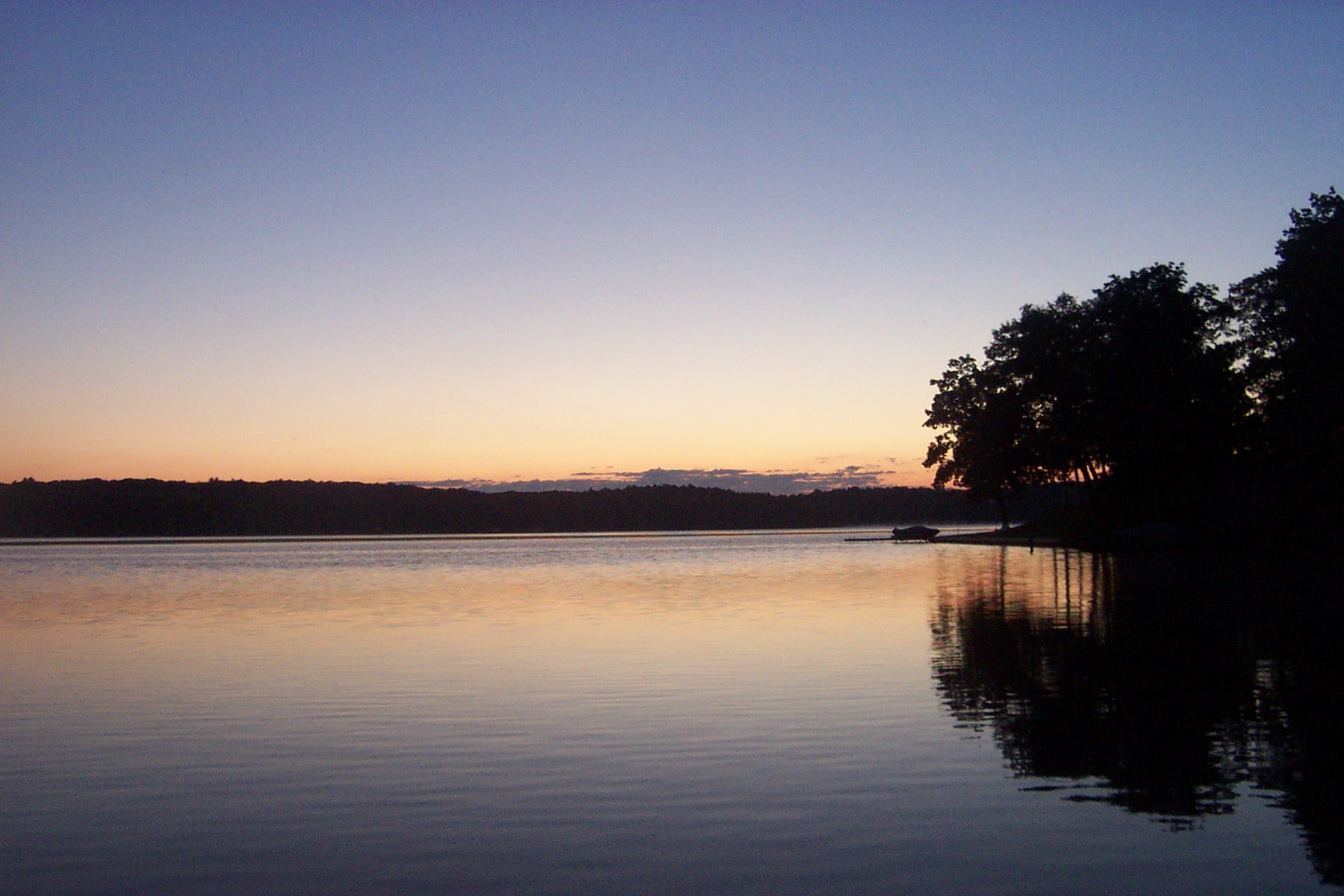

- Location within Michigan Location within the United States
- Location: Michigan
- Coordinates: 44°06′N 86°30′W
- Type: Lake
- Basin countries: United States
- Max. length: 12 miles (19 km)
- Max. width: 2 miles (3.2 km)
- Surface area: 4,990 acres (20.2 km^{2})
- Max. depth: 80 ft (24 m)
- Surface elevation: 594 ft (181 m)

Hamlin Lake is a man-made lake in Michigan enlarged by the backup of the Big Sable River by the Hamlin Lake Dam before it reaches Lake Michigan. The lake, which covers 5,350 acres (21.7 km^{2}) or 4,990 acres (20.2 km^{2}), is 12 miles (19 km) long and 2 miles (3.2 km) wide. It is the largest man-made lake in Michigan. It has two sections, the upper and lower lakes, which are separated by the narrows. The western section has a maximum depth of almost 80 feet (24 m) while the eastern section is only 34 feet (10 m) The first dam was built in the 1850s for a sawmill. Ludington State Park lies along the entire western shore of the lake while the eastern tip of the lake is in the Manistee National Forest.

The lake is great for swimming during summer months as it is typically much warmer than Lake Michigan and has a smaller swimming area, making it easier to keep track of family and friends. Dunes separate the western shore of Hamlin Lake from the eastern shore of Lake Michigan. State park visitors can rent a variety of boats at this location and many of the park's trails (including a canoe trail) begin and end here. During the winter season, ice fishing is popular. Gamefish have been stocked in the lake since the 1890s.

== History ==
Hamlin lake once was a small town, but in 1888 the wooden dam protecting the town collapsed, flooding the town. The dam was rebuilt in 1912, before collapsing again, flooding the area. It was later incorporated into Ludington State Park in the 1930s.

It is the largest man-made lake in Michigan.

== See also ==
- List of lakes in Michigan
