= Charles G. Bryant =

American architect

Charles Grandison Bryant (1803–1850) was an architect, soldier, adventurer, and American expansionist whose career stretched from Maine to Texas. He is one of few prominent figures to have taken part in American expansionism on both the Canadian and Mexican borders.

Born the son of a shipwright in Belfast, Maine, Bryant learned the trade of housewright, and by 1825 had established himself in the nearby lumber port and boom town of Bangor, Maine. In 1830 he was the first housewright in Maine to begin calling himself "architect", and consequently took on more ambitious projects, sometimes selling plans but not executing the commissions himself. He drew a master plan for Bangor's streets, and for Mount Hope Cemetery, only the second garden cemetery in the United States. He also designed a number of Greek Revival style houses and commercial blocks for the city's mercantile elite, such as Mercantile Row (1833–34, no longer extant), and began speculating in land. The major commissions by Bryant in Bangor include:

- William Emerson House, Union St., 1832 (demolished)
- Nathaniel Hatch House, Court St., 1832 (extant)
- Elias T. Aldrich House, Summer St., 1833 (demolished)
- Mercantile Block, Broad St., 1833-34 (demolished)
- Bangor House (hotel), Main St.,1833-34 (extant)
- Jonas Cutting-Edward Kent House, Penobscot & Pine St., 1833 (extant)
- Nicholas G. Norcross House, Broadway, 1833-34 (extant)
- Samuel Smith House, Broadway, 1834-35 (extant)
- Rufus & Calvin Dwinel Double House, Broadway, 1835 (demolished)
- Pine St. Methodist Church, 1836-37 (demolished)
- John A. Poor - Moses Appleton Double House, High St., 1836-37 (extant but highly altered)
- George W. Brown House, High St., 1835-36 (extant)
- George W. Pickering House, High St., 1835-37 (extant)
- Charles G. Bryant Double House, Division St., 1836 (extant)

As a local militia officer, Bryant was also instrumental in putting down a deadly riot in Bangor in 1833, involving newly arrived Irish immigrants and American loggers and sailors. Bangor incorporated as a city the following year in order to establish a police force, and prevent recurrences.:

Bryant lost heavily in the Panic of 1837 and turned his attention from architecture to running a military school. The school became a headquarters for conspirators plotting to wrest Canada from British control, and Bryant was arrested in July, 1838 for violating neutrality laws. Bangor and Maine politicians were then engaged in their own border dispute with Canada known as the Aroostook War, which would come to a head the following year with the intervention of the U.S. Army. Jumping bail in order to participate in ongoing Canadian Rebellions of 1837, Bryant styled himself "The Grand Eagle" in his secret correspondence with the rebellion's leaders, but the movement soon collapsed and his contribution ended in fiasco. Returning to Bangor, Bryant closed his school and left with his oldest son, Andrew Jackson Bryant, for the newly created Republic of Texas.

Settling in Galveston, Bryant practiced as one of the Republic's first architects, designing St. Mary's Cathedral (1847–48), the Galveston Prison and Court Room (1847–48), and the Charles K. Rhodes House in San Luis (1840). In 1842 he also joined the Galveston Fusiliers, a local militia unit, and participated in the invasion of Rafael Vasquez. Later he became a Major in the Texas Rangers. While on an expedition against the Lipan Apaches in 1850 Bryant's unit was ambushed and he was killed and scalped.
