= Mason County Courthouse (Michigan) =

- U.S. National Register of Historic Places
- Michigan State Historic Site
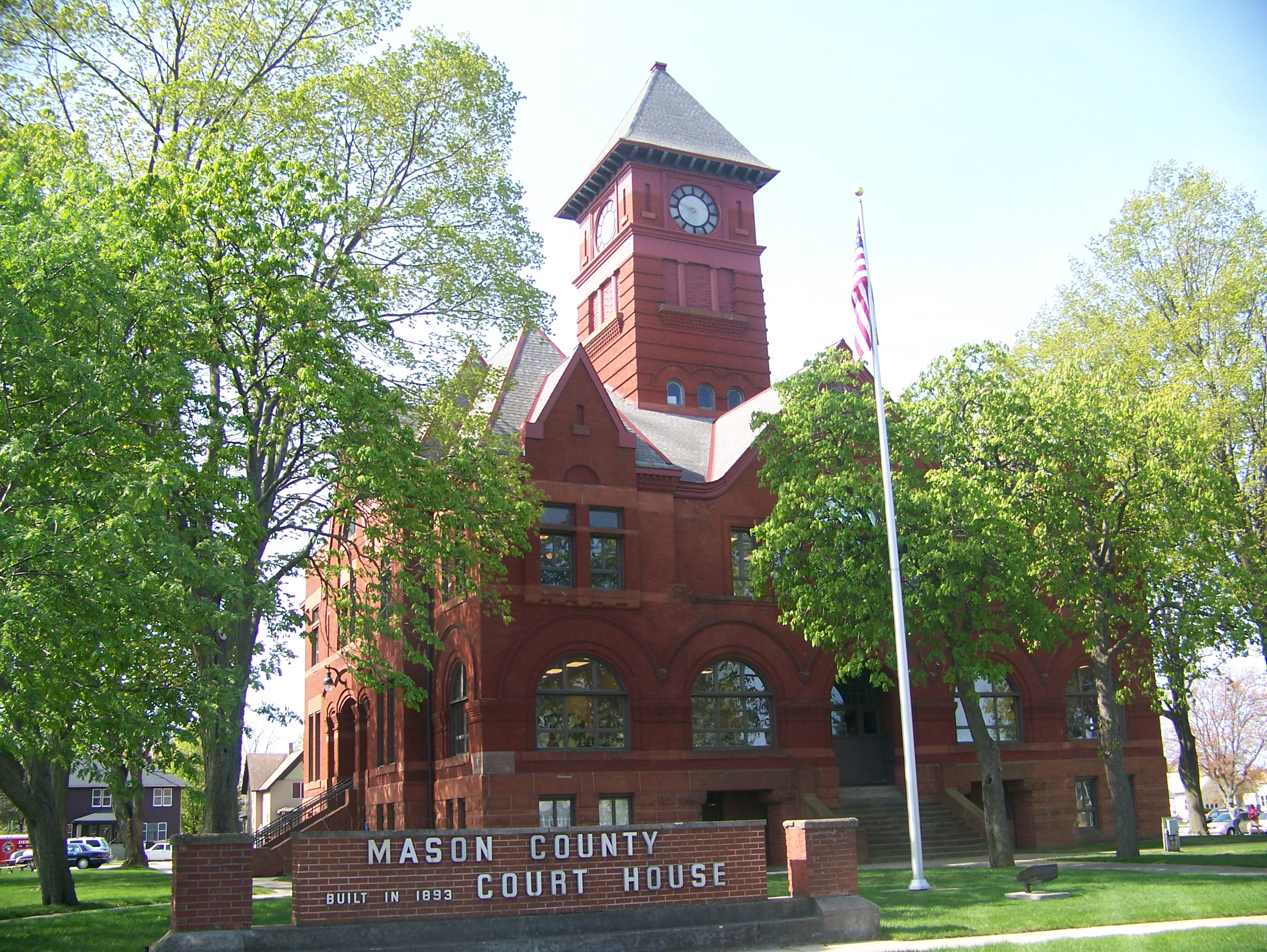
- Mason County Courthouse in 2008

- Location within Michigan Location within the United States
- Interactive map
- Location: 300 E. Ludington Ave., Ludington, Michigan
- Coordinates: 43°57′17″N 86°26′40″W
- Area: 2 acres (0.81 ha)
- Built: 1893
- Built by: Charles T. Gatke
- Architect: Sidney J. Osgood
- Architectural style: Romanesque, Richardsonian Romanesque
- NRHP reference No.: 88000602

Significant dates
- Added to NRHP: May 19, 1988
- Designated MSHS: August 15, 1975

The Mason County Courthouse is a courthouse located at 300 East Ludington Avenue in Ludington, Michigan. It was listed on the National Register of Historic Places in 1988.

== History ==
The first courthouse in Mason County was located in the two-story home of Burr Caswell, who turned over the home to the county in 1856. In 1861 the courthouse was moved to a store building located in the now-vanished village of Little Sauble in the north of the county. In 1873 the county seat was moved to the more centrally located village of Ludington, and a single-story county office building was built. Although this building was enlarged, it was quickly outgrown, and in 1892 voters approved the construction of a new courthouse.

The courthouse square was acquired in 1893, and the county hired Grand Rapids architect Sidney J. Osgood to design a new courthouse. Construction began later that year and was completed in September 1894.

== Description ==
The Mason County Courthouse is a square, Richardsonian Romanesque building constructed of dark red brick and reddish brown sandstone. The raised basement story is finished with rock-faced sandstone, and two upper floors are finished with brick, with a beltcourse, window sills, lintels, and other trim of the same sandstone. The building is topped with a combination hip and gable roof. In the center is a pyramid-roof clock tower.
