= Big Sable River =

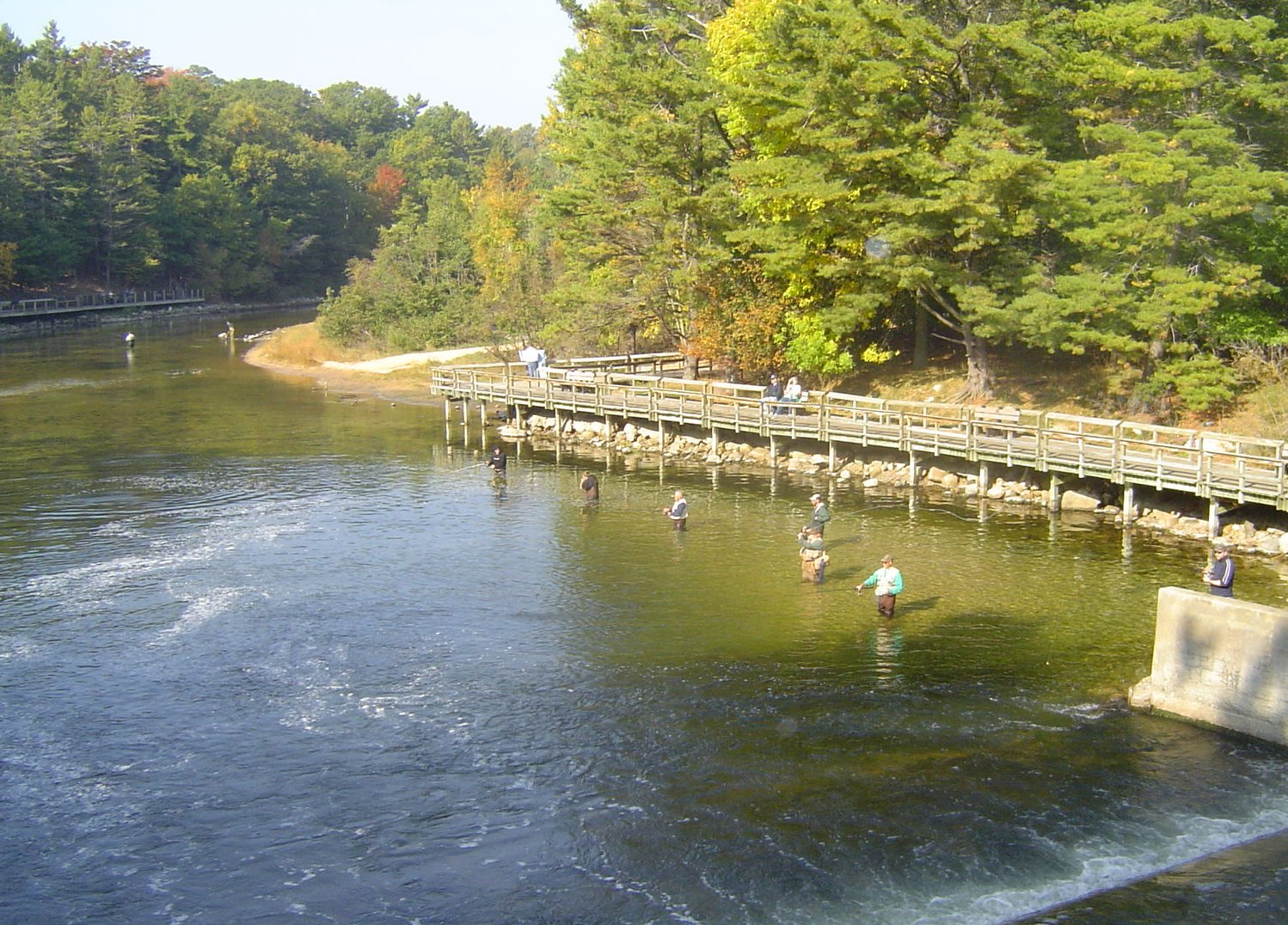
- Fishing on the Big Sable, just below Hamlin Lake Dam

Location
- Country: United States

Physical characteristics
- Source
  - location: confluence of Sauble Lakes chain and Bloody-Run Creek in Lake County, Michigan
  - coordinates: 44.060564°N 85.93646°W
- Mouth
  - location: Lake Michigan, Mason County, Michigan
  - coordinates: 44.03028°N 86.50703°W
- Length: 52 mi (84 km)

The Big Sable River is a 52-mile-long (84 km) river in Michigan in the United States. It originates in Lake County in the chain of lakes known as Sauble Lakes and flows across Lake and Mason counties. It is dammed to form Hamlin Lake, and below the dam continues through Ludington State Park to empty into Lake Michigan. It is not navigable for the most part, but the section between Hamlin Lake and Lake Michigan is popular for tubing. It is considered an excellent river for fishing. It appears on maps as both "Big Sable" and "Big Sauble".

== See also ==
- List of rivers of Michigan
