= Big Sable Point Light =

Lighthouse in Michigan, United States

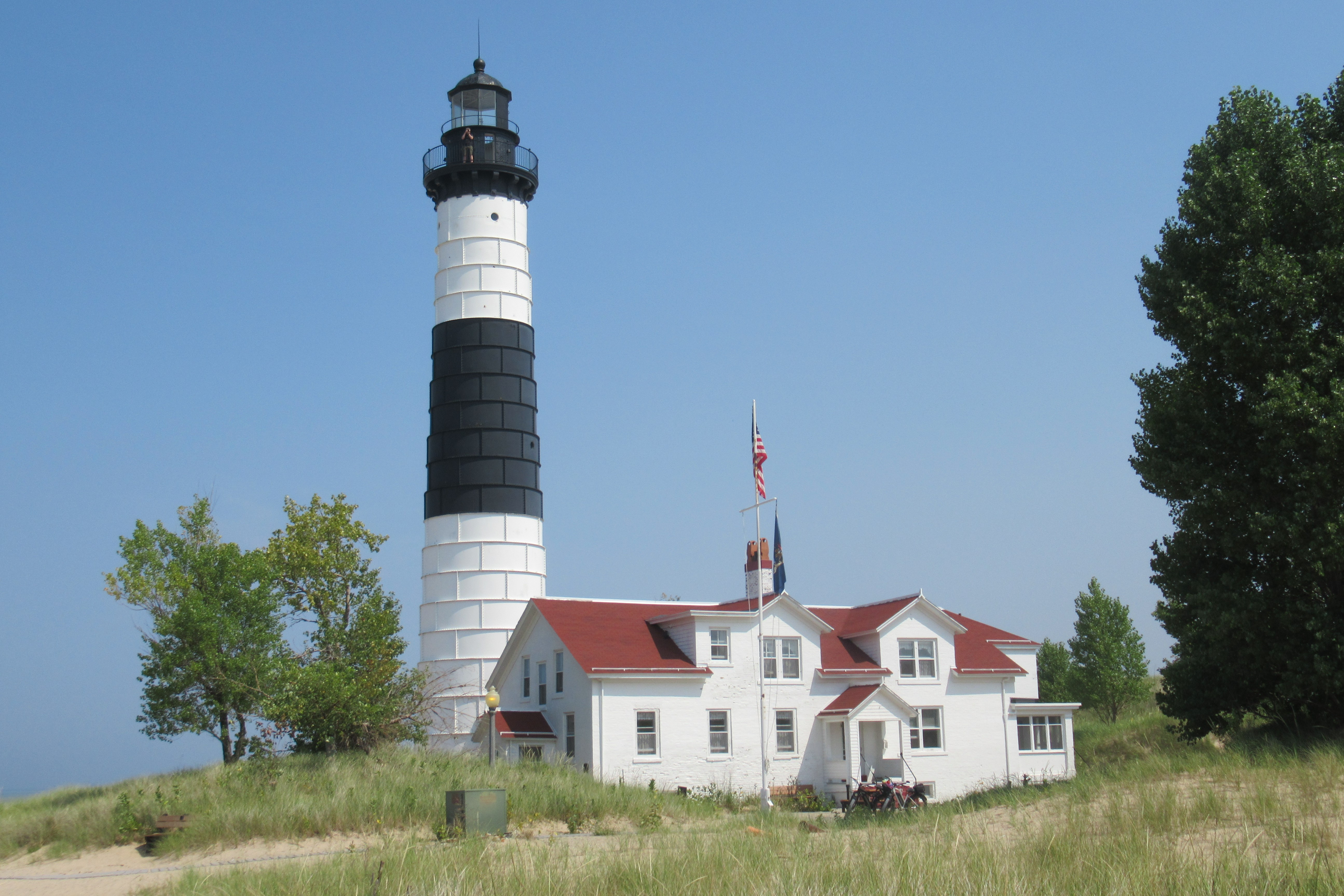
- Location: Ludington State Park; Hamlin Township, Michigan
- Coordinates: 44°03′28″N 86°30′52″W

Tower
- Constructed: 1867
- Foundation: Wood pilings
- Construction: originally Cream City brick, later encased in cast iron plate
- Automated: 1968
- Height: 112 feet (34 m)
- Shape: Frustum of a Cone
- Markings: White and black tower/Black parapet & Lantern
- Heritage: National Register of Historic Places listed place, Michigan State Historic Site

Light
- First lit: 1867
- Focal height: 106 feet (32 m)
- Lens: Third order Fresnel lens (original), 12-inch (300 mm) ML-300 Tideland Signal acrylic optic (current)
- Range: 15 nautical miles (28 km; 17 mi)
- Characteristic: White, fixed light. Obscured from 238° to 346°.
- Big Sable Point Light Station
- U.S. National Register of Historic Places
- Michigan State Historic Site
- Location: Big Sable Point, Ludington, Michigan
- Area: 2 acres (0.81 ha)
- Architect: Col. Orlando M. Poe
- MPS: U.S. Coast Guard Lighthouses and Light Stations on the Great Lakes TR
- NRHP reference No.: 83004296

Significant dates
- Added to NRHP: August 04, 1983
- Designated MSHS: May 19, 1988

Big Sable Point Light is a lighthouse on the eastern shore of Lake Michigan in the U.S. state of Michigan. It is located within Ludington State Park just north of the city of Ludington. First constructed in 1867, it continues to be an active navigational aid.

== History ==
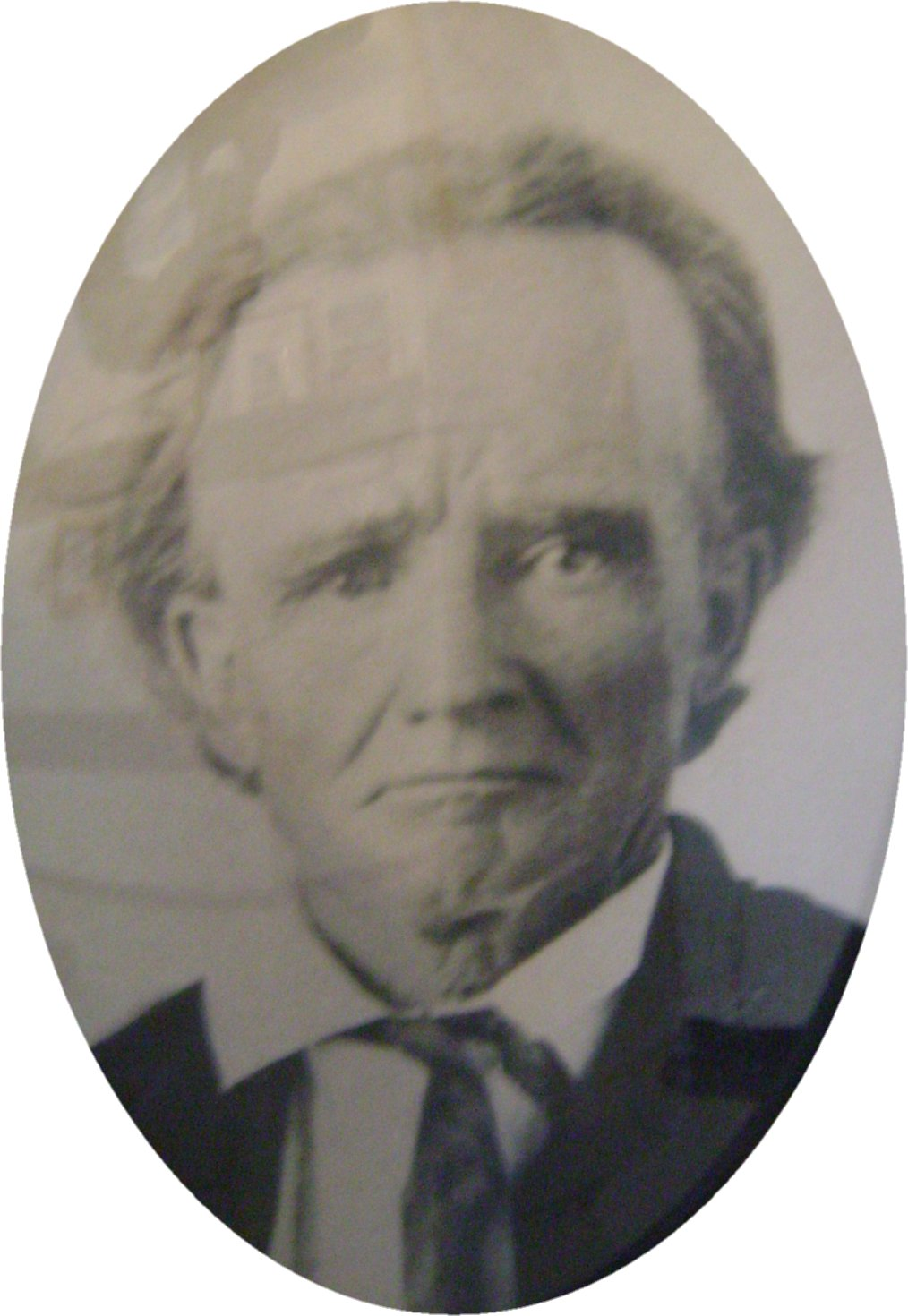
Alexander A. L. "Alonzo" Hyde served as the first lighthouse keeper from 1867 to 1871.

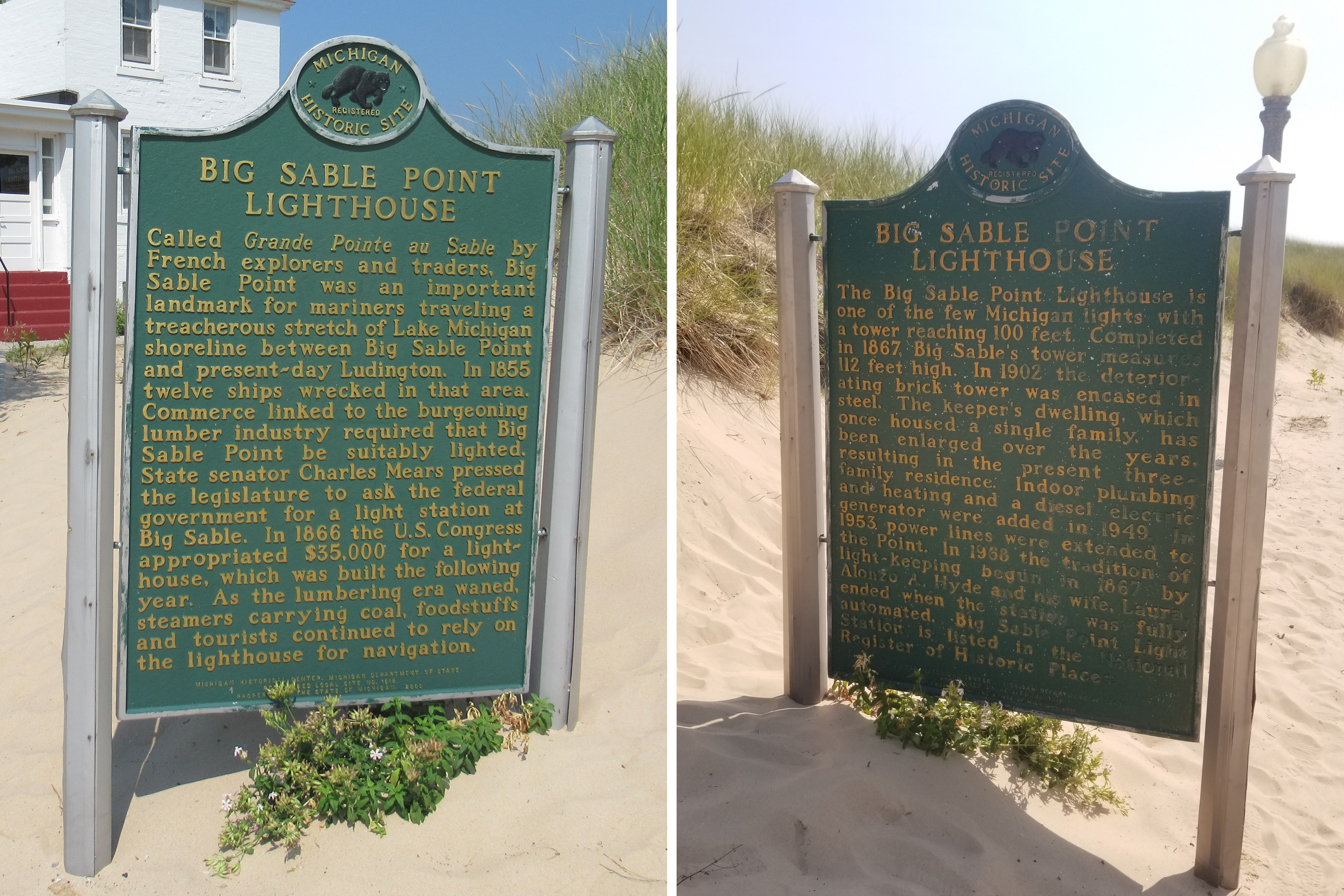
Dual-sided Michigan state historic marker

On July 28, 1866, Congress appropriated $35,000 for a new lighthouse at Big Sable Point. Approximately 933 acres (378 ha) was deeded from the State of Michigan to the U.S. at no cost and in early 1867 construction began, making it the first light station in the area.

Built in 1867, the 112-foot (34 m) tower was originally made of yellow cream brick. It has a focal plane of 106 feet (32 m). The building was made of so-called Cream City Brick. The brick deteriorated and was thereafter covered with boiler plate in 1900.

Construction materials were brought up by ships. The first road to the site was not completed until 1933.

Because the brick deteriorated from exposure to the elements, a steel plate encasement was installed in 1900 at a cost of $3,225. The yellow brick now encased in steel plate was difficult to see and a daymark was needed. Several changes to the daymark over the years were made. Currently, the tower is painted white with a black watch tower and a black band around the middle of the tower. Despite the artist who colorized this historic post card coloring the middle third of the lighthouse red there is no evidence it has ever been any color other than black.

It was the last Great Lakes Lighthouse to get electricity and plumbing, which came in the late 1940s.

The original lens was a third order Fresnel lens, inscribed "Sautter & Co., Constructeurs." It was removed in 1985, and is now on display at the Rose Hawley Museum at White Pine Village. The lighthouse follows a design first used at New Presque Isle Light, which was also used on several other lights on the Great Lakes.

After the light was automated, the keeper's house was severely vandalized.

In 1986, the lighthouse station was leased to the Foundation for Behavioral Research. The foundation has worked with the Big Sable Lighthouse Association to preserve the buildings.

Lighthouse keepers were: Alonzo Hyde Sr. (1867–1869), Alonzo W. Hyde (1869–1871), Newton Bird (1871–1873), Burr Caswell (1874–1882), Hans Hansen (1882–1887), James Rich (1887–1888), Tomas Bailey (1889–1893), George Blake (1899–1903), Samuel Gagnon (1905–1923), Joseph Kimmers (1922–1923), Leweilyn Vanatter (1923–1936), George Rogan (1936–1949), David Sauers (1949–1954), Henry Vavrina (1955–1965), Homer Meverden (1965–1968).

In the middle of the 20th Century, 1949, Big Sable was electrified. It was the last Great Lakes light to give up wicks. This paved the way for automation and the elimination of the Lighthouse keeper's job.

The fog horn, which was steam and then diesel.

Buildings at the lightstation included the tower and dwelling, fog signal building, boat house, barn, three oil houses, two privy's and a Diaphone fog signal. The fog signal building fell into the lake due to erosion in 1943.

The site is the subject of constant erosion, so that keeping the foundation in place and the water away from undermining it has been a recurrent and expensive battle.

Listed as Big Sable Point Light Station in the National Register of Historic Places in 1983 as reference #83004296. It is also on the state inventory list.

A historical marker in front of the lighthouse reads:

Called Grande Pointe au Sable by French explorers and traders, Big Sable Point was an important landmark for mariners traveling a treacherous stretch of Lake Michigan shoreline between Big Sable Point and present-day Ludington. In 1855 twelve ships wrecked in that area. Commerce linked to the burgeoning lumber industry required Big Sable Point be suitably lighted. State Senator Charles Mears pressed the legislature to ask the federal government for a light station at Big Sable. In 1866 the U.S. Congress appropriated $35,000 for a lighthouse, which was built the following year. As the lumbering era waned, steamers carrying coal foodstuffs and tourists continued to rely on the lighthouse for navigation.

The Big Sable Point Lighthouse is one of the few Michigan lights with a tower reaching 100 feet (30 m). Completed in 1867 Big Sable's tower measured 112 feet (34 m) high. In 1900 the deteriorating brick tower was encased in steel. The keeper's dwelling, which once housed a single family, has been enlarged over the years, resulting in the present three-family residence. Indoor plumbing and heating and a diesel electric generator were added in 1953. In 1953 power lines were extended to the Point. In 1966 the tradition of light-keeping begun in 1867 by Alonzo A. Hyde and his wife Laura ended when the station was fully automated. Big Sable Point Light Station is listed in the National Register of Historic Places.

== Current status and access ==
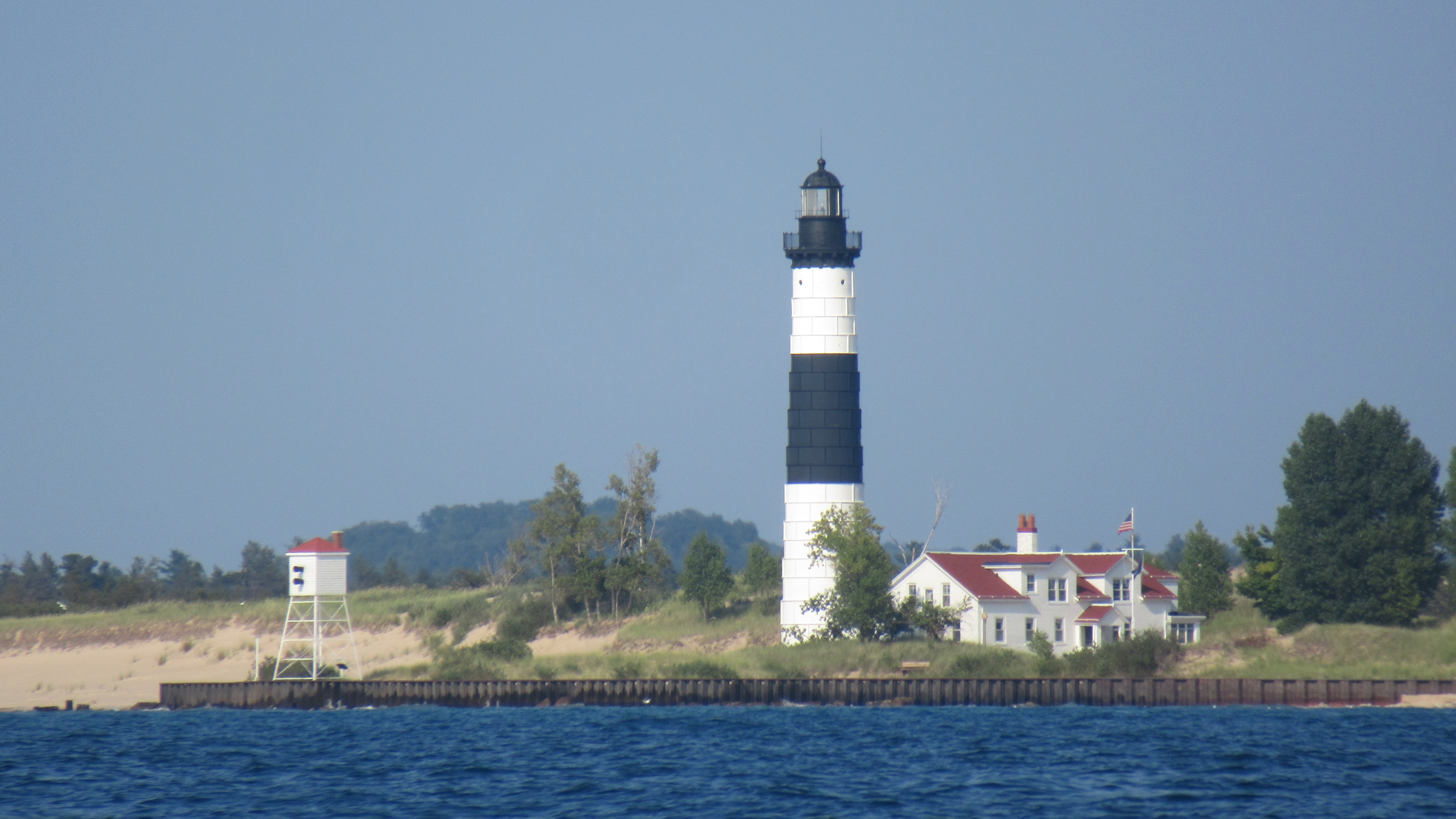
Lighthouse complex view from the lake

The lighthouse was transferred to state ownership on November 1, 2002. The site manager is the Sable Points Light Keepers Association.

Take state highway M-116 north from Ludington to Lakeshore Drive. Proceed north for 6.5-mile (10.5 km) to Ludington State Park. A vehicle permit is required and a fee collected. It is under the care of the Sable Point Lightkeepers Association, which was formed in 1986. The organization has been instrumental in restoring the light and associated buildings. A volunteer keeper program makes is possible for volunteers to live and work in the lighthouse for two week periods. There is a waiting list to do this. Tours are available, and events do occur (a calendar is available).

Bus transportation is available June 24, July 13 & 29, August 12 & 26th and September 23, 2017. Buses travel from the State Park Rangers House inside the State Park to the lighthouse is from 12pm to 5pm. Round trip cost is $5.00 per adult rider and $2.00 for children 12 and under. Otherwise, access requires a 1.5-mile (2.4 km) walk up the beach or hiking trail.

Big Sable Lighthouse is open daily May 8 through November 4, 2017 from 10am to 5pm. Cost to climb the tower is $5.00 for adults and $2.00 for children 12 and under. Gift shop and video room are open to all at no charge.

== See also ==
- Lighthouses in the United States
