= Ludington State Park =

Park in Michigan, United States

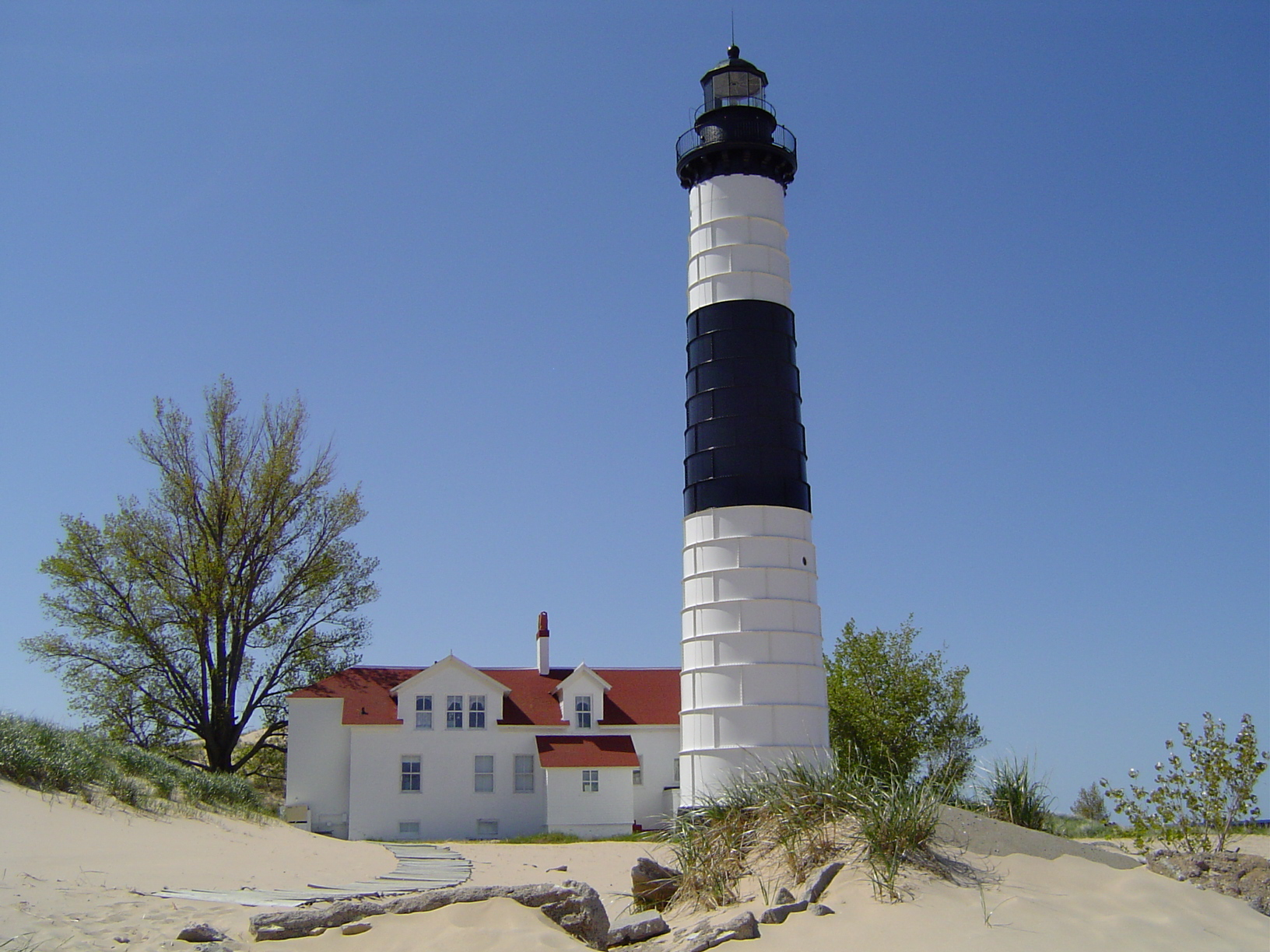
- Big Sable Point Lighthouse

- Location within Michigan Location within the United States
- Location: Mason County, Michigan, United States
- Nearest city: Ludington, Michigan
- Coordinates: 44°01′49″N 86°30′25″W
- Area: 4,800 acres (1,900 ha)
- Elevation: 587 feet (179 m)
- Established: 1927
- Administrator: Michigan Department of Natural Resources
- Designation: Michigan State Park
- Website: www.michigan.gov/recsearch/parks/Ludington

Ludington State Park is a public recreation area located two miles north of Ludington, Michigan, occupying 4,800 acres (1,900 ha) between the shores of Lake Michigan and Hamlin Lake. The state park is crossed by a one-mile stretch of the Big Sable River and is home to the 112-foot-high (34 m) Big Sable Point Lighthouse, which dates from 1876.

== Ecology ==
The state park encompasses multiple ecosystems including sand dune, forest, wetlands, and marshlands. The park contains the southern 2,820 acres (11.4 km^{2}) of the Big Sable Dunes complex, with the Nordhouse Dunes Wilderness, immediately north of the park, preserving the northern half of the complex.

== History ==
The park began through the efforts of the Isaac Walton League to have 800 acres held by the federal government as a lighthouse preserve transferred to the state of Michigan for the purpose of creating a state park. The park was established in 1927 after the U.S. Congress authorized the transfer. During the 1930s, the Civilian Conservation Corps was active in the park making improvements that included building the park's Arts and Crafts style beach house. In 2002, the U.S. Coast Guard deeded the 57.5-acre (23.3 ha) lighthouse station complex to the Michigan Department of Natural Resources.

== Activities and amenities ==
The park's water activities include fishing and swimming on Lake Michigan and Hamlin Lake and tubing on Big Sable River. The park offers 21.5 miles of hiking trails, 10 miles of cross-country ski trails, a 2-mile bicycle trail, and a 4-mile canoe trail. The park has four campgrounds containing a total of 360 campsites that include remote hike-in sites. The park also offers a cafe and lighthouse tours and is a stop on the Mason County Sculpture Trail.
