= List of Michigan State Historic Sites =

Location of Michigan within the United States

The following is a list of Michigan State Historic Sites. The register is maintained by the Michigan State Historic Preservation Office, which was established in the late 1960s after the passage of the National Historic Preservation Act of 1966. Sites marked with a dagger (†) are also listed on the National Register of Historic Places in Michigan. Those with a double dagger (‡) are also designated National Historic Landmarks. As of June 2011, there were more than 2,700 total listings distributed through each of Michigan's 83 counties. In addition, several historical markers have been erected outside of Michigan.

Alcona (6) • **Alger** (19) • **Allegan** (37) • **Alpena** (13) • Antrim (10) • Arenac (5) • Baraga (10) • **Barry** (30) • **Bay** (34) • Benzie (8) • **Berrien** (53) • **Branch** (23) • **Calhoun** (110) • **Cass** (23) • **Charlevoix** (21) • **Cheboygan** (17) • **Chippewa** (31) • Clare (9) • **Clinton** (26) • Crawford (9) • **Delta** (13) • **Dickinson** (12) • **Eaton** (54) • **Emmet** (26) • **Genesee** (80) • Gladwin (2) • Gogebic (9) • **Grand Traverse** (22) • **Gratiot** (20) • **Hillsdale** (25) • **Houghton** (39) • **Huron** (30) • **Ingham** (103) • **Ionia** (36) • Iosco (10) • **Iron** (14) • **Isabella** (13) • **Jackson** (47) • **Kalamazoo** (62) • Kalkaska (4) • **Kent** (83) • **Keweenaw** (15) • Lake (9) • **Lapeer** (29) • **Leelanau** (25) • **Lenawee** (69) • **Livingston** (31) • Luce (7) • **Mackinac** (48) • **Macomb** (62) • **Manistee** (20) • **Marquette** (41) • **Mason** (17) • **Mecosta** (14) • **Menominee** (15) • Midland (7) • Missaukee (2) • **Monroe** (26) • Montcalm (10) • Montmorency (5) • **Muskegon** (27) • **Newaygo** (14) • **Oakland** (198) • Oceana (6) • Ogemaw (6) • Ontonagon (9) • Osceola (8) • Oscoda (2) • Otsego (3) • **Ottawa** (55) • **Presque Isle** (13) • Roscommon (5) • **Saginaw** (44) • **St. Clair** (45) • **St. Joseph** (43) • **Sanilac** (29) • Schoolcraft (5) • **Shiawassee** (36) • **Tuscola** (47) • **Van Buren** (28) • **Washtenaw** (96) • **Wayne** (357) • **Wexford** (14) • Outside Michigan (8)

Numbers in parentheses denote the number of State Historic Sites in that county. Counties in bold link to separate articles.
Counties with their own articles are limited to those that have more than 10 individual sites or markers.

== Alcona County ==
Name	Image	Location	City	Listing date
Addison Silverthorn Jewelry Store		115 Lake Street	Harrisville	August 29, 1996
Greenbush School		5017 Campbell Street	Greenbush Township	August 3, 1979
Joseph Van Buskirk House		659 US 23 South	Harrisville Township	February 11, 1972
Sturgeon Point Light Station†		East Point Road; Sturgeon Point State Park	Haynes Township	February 18, 1982
Town of Alcona Informational Designation		5518 Alcona Road	Alcona Township	2010
West Harrisville Depot		116 Fiske Street	Lincoln	December 3, 1998

== Antrim County ==
Name	Image	Location	City	Listing date
Antrim County Courthouse†		203 East Cayuga Street	Bellaire	April 5, 1974
Brown's School		4891 M-32 at Marsh Rd.	Jordan Township	August 3, 1979
Central Lake High School	Central Lake High School	Southwest Corner of State and Howard streets	Central Lake	August 12, 1983
Elk Rapids Iron Company Informational Site	Elk Rapids Iron Company	Ames Street (in the yard of the Elks Rapids Inn)	Elk Rapids	February 28, 1969
Elk Rapids Township Hall†	Elk Rapids Township Hall-Elk Rapids	401 River Street	Elk Rapids	November 15, 1973
Essex Town Site Commemorative Designation		Southwest corner of South Dennis and Essex Roads	Ellsworth	September 14, 1995
Holtz Site†	Holtz Site-archaeological site	Island in the Intermediate River	Bellaire	June 20, 1970
Hughes House†	Hughes House-Elk Rapids	109 Elm Street	Elk Rapids	October 21, 1975
Edwin Noble House	Edwin Noble House	Isle of Pines Drive	Elk Rapids	April 24, 1979
Pere Marquette Railroad Depot (Alden Station)		10669 Coy Street	Alden	July 23, 1987
Saint John Nepomucene Catholic Church		M-32 and 4973 St. John Road	East Jordan	November 16, 1994
Village of Wetzell Informational Designation		US 131 North	Mancelona Township	January 19, 1989

== Arenac County ==
Name	Image	Location	City	Listing date
First Presbyterian Church of Maple Ridge		202 Briggs Road	Prescott	November 16, 1981
Lalone Site (20ARL)		SE, NE 5, 18N 5E	Standish	September 17, 1974
Michigan Central Railroad Standish Depot†		107 North Main Street (North Main St at West Cedar St.)	Standish	August 27, 1977
Saganing Indian Mission Church		5480 Sturman Rd., Saganing Indian Reservation	Standish Township	November 30, 1983
Second Arenac County Courthouse†		Central Avenue (US 23), east of Main Rd	Omer	March 2, 1976

== Baraga County ==
Name	Image	Location	City	Listing date
Assinins†		US 41	Assinins	June 19, 1971
Baraga County Courthouse		16 South Third Street	L'Anse	May 21, 1985
Covington Town Hall	Covington Town Hall	13381 Center St.	Covington	July 15, 2016
Hebard-Ford Summer House†	Hebard-Ford Summer Home	13730 Ford Dr.	Pequaming	September 10, 1979
Keweenaw Bay Informational Designation	Keweenaw Bay	Baraga State Park on US 41, between Baraga and L'Anse	Baraga Township	January 19, 1957
Kewawenon Mission†		227 Front Street, between Whirl-I-Gig Road and Peter Marksman Rd, 3.5 miles (5.6 km) northeast of L'Anse, Sec. 19, T51N, R32W	Zeba	January 29, 1979
L'Anse - Lac Vieux Desert Trail Informational Designation		US 41	L'Anse	November 15, 1984
Jacob and Anna Leinonen Homestead	Jacob and Anna Leinonen Homestead	13960 Murphy Road	Covington	July 15, 1999
Pelkie School House	Pelkie School House	15009 Pelkie Rd.	Pelkie	June 10, 1980
Pequaming	Pequaming	8 miles (13 km) north of L' Anse	Pequaming	April 23, 1971
Skanee School	Skanee School	13730 Skanee Rd.	Skanee	July 17, 1981

== Benzie County ==
Name	Image	Location	City	Listing date
Benzie County Courthouse†		7157 Crystal Avenue	Beulah	February 16, 1979
Benzonia College Informational Designation		River Road, Benzonia Village Park, US-31	Benzonia	July 10, 1963
Benzonia Congregational Church	Benzonia Congregational Church	6941 Grand Traverse Avenue	Benzonia	February 23, 1981
Car Ferries on Lake Michigan Informational Designation		River Road at Lake Michigan	Frankfort	January 19, 1957
Bruce Catton Informational Designation		891 Michigan Avenue	Benzonia	May 8, 1984
Marquette's Death Informational Designation		Mouth of the Betsie River	Frankfort vicinity	June 11, 1965
Mills Community House†		891 Michigan Avenue	Benzonia	1977
Pacific Salmon	Platte River Hatchery	15200 Honor Highway	Beulah	February 22, 1974
Watervale†	Watervale Inn	975–1422 Watervale Road	Blaine Township	December 19, 1991

== Clare County ==
Name	Image	Location	City	Listing date
Clare Congregational Church†	Clare Congregational Church-Clare	110 Fifth Street	Clare	March 17, 1994
Harrison Informational Designation		Lake Street and Budd Lake	Harrison	December 21, 1978
George and Martha Hitchcock House†	George and Martha Hitchcock House	205 East Michigan Street	Farwell	July 29, 1980
Irish Counties		Clare Welcome Center on US 127	Grant Township	July 19, 1962
Ladies' Library Association of Farwell	Ladies Library Association	221 West Main Street	Farwell	August 3, 1979
Lincoln Township Hall	Lincoln Township Hall	175 Lake George Avenue	Lake George	November 7, 1977
Logging Railroads Commemorative Designation		Highway Park, old US-27, 7.5 miles N of Clare	Hatton Township	February 18, 1956
Michigan Petroleum Industry	Michigan Petroleum Industry	Clare Welcome Center on US 127	Grant Township	1961
William Henry Wilson House	William Henry Wilson House	390 Main Street	Harrison	April 18, 1983

== Crawford County ==
Name	Image	Location	City	Listing date
32nd Red Arrow Division Informational Designation		Camp Grayling, vicinity of stone mess hall	Grayling	April 15, 1977
Beginning of State Reforestation Informational Site		Higgins Lake Nursery, County Road 200, 1/2 mile east of old US-27, 1/4 mile N of Roscommon County line	Grayling vicinity	February 26, 1957
Camp Grayling Officers Open Mess		Building #311, Howe Road	Grayling	August 24, 1978
Douglas House†		6122 County Road 612	Grayling	November 18, 2000
Grayling Fish Hatchery		4893 W North Down River Road	Grayling	February 26, 1957
Hartwick Pines		3896 Hartwick Pines Rd.	Grayling Charter Township	September 17, 1957
Michigan Central Railroad - Grayling Station		401 Norway Street	Grayling	August 21, 1986
Pere Cheney Cemetery	Port Cheney Cemetery	End of Center Plains Trail	Roscommon	February 18, 1993
Homesite of Chief David Shoppenagon Informational Site		Old US-27/I-75 intersection at Au Sable River	Grayling	December 12, 1979

== Gladwin County ==
Name	Image	Location	City	Listing date
Zion Evangelical Lutheran Church	Zion Evangelical Lutheran Church	3555 North Oberlin Road	Sherman Township	November 20, 1987
Zion Evangelical Lutheran School	Zion Evangelical Lutheran School	3557 North Oberlin Road	Sherman Township	November 20, 1987

== Gogebic County ==
Name	Image	Location	City	Listing date
Ashland Mine	Ashland Mine	215 W McLeod Ave, Ironwood, MI 49938	Ironwood	March 3, 1971
Colby Mine		503 Burma Rd.	Bessemer	September 25, 1956
Copper Peak†		North Black River Valley Parkway, Ottawa National Forest	Ironwood vicinity	January 22, 1971
Solomon S. Curry House†		631 East McLeod Avenue	Ironwood	November 7, 1977
Erwin Central School		N8908 Van Buskirk Road	Erwin Township	2012
Gogebic County Courthouse†		200 North Moore Street	Bessemer	December 10, 1971
Gogebic Iron Range Informational Designation	Gogebic Iron Range	Memory Lane Park (roadside park on US-2, 1 mile east of Bessemer)	Bessemer vicinity	August 23, 1956
Ironwood City Hall†		McLeod Avenue and Norfolk Street	Ironwood	May 14, 1975
Norrie Park Informational Designation	Norrie Park	498 W. Norrie Park Road	Ironwood	April 13, 1960
Raphael Pumpelly, Site of Discovery of Iron Ore Formation Informational Designation		Across from No. 1 Newport Heights, off of Country Club/Bonnie Road	Ironwood	August 3, 1979

== Iosco County ==
Name	Image	Location	City	Listing date
Alabaster Informational site		Intersection of Benson and Turtle roads	Alabaster	August 8, 1963
Alabaster Historic District†		Bounded by Lake Huron, Gypsum, Keystone, and Rempert Rds.	Alabaster	December 16, 1977
Edward A. Brackenridge House		218 West Dwight Street	Oscoda	November 26, 1985
Louis Chevalier Claim Informational Site		295 Harbor Street	Au Sable	July 29, 1980
Cooke Hydroelectric Plant†		1201 Cooke Dam Rd.	Oscoda	August 2, 1996
Dock Reserve Informational Site		Beach at end of Michigan, River Road, Dwight and Park streets	Oscoda	July 21, 1988
Five Channels Dam Archeological District†		6051 State Route 65	Glennie	March 13, 2002
Green Pack House		5014 N US-23	Oscoda	January 27, 1983
Ladies Literary Club Building		316 Newman Street	East Tawas	April 5, 1974
Lumbering on the Huron Shore Informational Designation		Tawas Point State Park	East Tawas	July 19, 1956
Lumberman's Memorial		5401 Monument Rd.	Oscoda Township	February 19, 1958
Pioneer Township Cemetery		4252 Old State Rd.	Grant Township	September 1, 1963
Tawas Point Light Station†		Tawas Point Road	East Tawas vicinity	April 23, 1971

== Kalkaska County ==
Name	Image	Location	City	Listing date
Excelsior Town Hall		987 Sigma Rd SE	Excelsior	July 26, 1974
Hotel Sieting		398 South Cedar Street	Kalkaska	August 23, 1990
Kalkaska Cemetery Chapel		260 West St.	Kalkaska	June 10, 1980
Rugg Pond Dam		4849 Valley Road	Kalkaska vicinity	May 8, 1984

== Lake County ==
Name	Image	Location	City	Listing date
Brown Trout Informational Designation		2.5 miles (4.0 km) south of Baldwin on M-37	Baldwin	February 15, 1984
Idlewild Informational Designation		US-10 and South Broadway Street	Idlewild	2009
Idlewild Lot Owners Association	Idlewild Lot Owners Association	Lake Drive and Glade Avenue	Idlewild	2009
The Island / The Flamingo Club	The Flamingo Club	1002 Martin Luther King Avenue	Idlewild	2009
Lake County Informational Designation		Lake County Courthouse	Baldwin	February 19, 1958
Marlborough Historic District†	Marlborough Historic District	James Road	Marlborough	October 1, 1971
Shrine of the Pines	Shrine of the Pines	M-37, 2 miles (3.2 km) south of Baldwin	Baldwin vicinity	July 20, 1982
Daniel Hale Williams House	100pxDaniel Hale Williams House	15712 Lake Drive	Idlewild	2009
Herman & Lela Wilson House	Herman & Lela Wilson House	6583 Paradise Path	Idlewild	2009

== Luce County ==
Name	Image	Location	City	Listing date
Helmer General Store and Resort	Helmer General Store and Resort	RD #3 - County Road 417, 0.5 miles (0.80 km) south of H-44	Helmer	January 13, 1982
Luce County Sheriff's House and Jail†		411 West Harrie Street	Newberry	August 15, 1975
John McGruer House	John McGruer House	7964 N. M-123	Newberry	June 30, 1988
Newberry Hotel	Newberry Hotel	301 South Newberry Avenue	Newberry	September 8, 1982
Newberry State Bank Building	Newberry State Bank Building	318 Newberry Avenue	Newberry	August 21, 1986
Life Saving Station Informational Site		Mouth of the Two Hearted River, Two Hearted River Forest Campground, east of County Road 423	Newberry vicinity	December 12, 1979
Watershed between Lake Superior and Lake Michigan		Roadside Park on M-28, west of M-117	Newberry vicinity	February 12, 1959

== Midland County ==
Name	Image	Location	City	Listing date
Bradley House†		Corner of Cook Road and Main Street	Midland	April 23, 1971
Chemical Industry Informational Designation		700 block of West Main Street	Midland	September 17, 1957
Homer Township Cemetery		1136 East Prairie Road, bounded by Pine River and Prairie roads	Midland vicinity	September 19, 1991
John and Almira Kelly House		505 Main Street	Midland	September 24, 1984
Midland County Courthouse†		301 West Main Street	Midland	May 21, 1985
James T. Pardee House†	James T. Pardee House	812 West Main Street	Midland	March 19, 1987
Upper Bridge		Currie Parkway over the Tittabawassee River	Midland	August 18, 1988
Alden Dow House and Studio		315 Post St	Midland	June 29, 1989

== Missaukee County ==
Name	Image	Location	City	Listing date
Lake City United Methodist Church Informational Designation		301 East John Street	Lake City	December 5, 1986
Swedish Lutheran Church (Demolished)	St. John's Lutheran Church-Lake City	3815 S Morey Rd, Lake City	Lake City	September 10, 1979

== Montcalm County ==
Name	Image	Location	City	Listing date
Charles J. Church-Frank S. Gibson House		301 South Barry	Greenville	May 18, 1989
Clifford Lake Hotel		561 West Clifford Lake Drive	Stanton vicinity	June 23, 1983
Cowden Lake Church of Christ (Disciples of Christ)		4510 Gravel Ridge Road, NE corner of Coral Road (County Road 530)	Coral vicinity	January 19, 1989
Ambrose J. Ecker House		615 Lafayette	Greenville	September 21, 1988
Charles H. Gibson House		311 West Washington Avenue	Greenville	March 21, 1991
Giles Gilbert House†		306 North Camburn Street	Stanton	May 8, 1984
Greenville Informational Designation		213 North Franklin Street	Greenville	August 15, 1975
Little Denmark Evangelical Lutheran Church		1031 South Johnson Road (County Road 595) at intersection of Pakes Road	Gowen vicinity	February 26, 1985
Saint Paul's Episcopal Church		305 South Clay Street, SE corner of Cass Street	Greenville	January 23, 1992
Winter Inn†		100 North Lafayette Street	Greenville	September 10, 1979

== Montmorency County ==
Name	Image	Location	City	Listing date
Angusdale Stock Farm		8291 Buttles Road	Vienna Township	2003
Big Rock Informational Designation		M-32 West at Thornton Road	Briley Township	January 17, 1991
Calvary Episcopal Church		330 North State Street, SE corner of Third Street	Hillman	May 8, 1984
Camp Lunden		County Road 612, 6 miles east of Lewiston	Albert Township	June 20, 1994
Congregational United Church of Christ		3191 Kneeland Street	Lewiston	February 25, 1988

== Oceana County ==
Name	Image	Location	City	Listing date
Benona Township Hall	Benona Township Hall	7169 West Baker Road	Shelby vicinity	July 20, 1989
Jared H. Gay Log House†		Route 2, 128th Avenue	Crystal Valley	May 15, 1987
Hart Historic Industrial District		215 Lincoln Street, 216 Lincoln Street, and 109 Union Street	Hart	June 21, 1990
Charles Mears Silver Lake Boardinghouse†	Charles Mears Boarding House	Southeast corner of Lighthouse and Silver Lake Channel roads	Mears vicinity	December 5, 1986
Pawabawme Burial Ground (Demolished)		Tyler Road at Walkerville Road	Hart vicinity	March 16, 1981
Petite Pointe Au Sable Lighthouse		North Lighthouse Drive	Golden Township	2014
Veterans Day Storm - Graveyard of Ships Informational Designation		421 South Hancock Street	Pentwater	May 21, 1985

== Ogemaw County ==
Name	Image	Location	City	Listing date
Cleveland Park Pavilion		Cleveland Park	Rose City	January 18, 2001
Ogemaw Springs Commemorative Designation		Maes Road	Ogemaw Township	2012
Rose City / The Big Fire Commemorative Designation		Rose City Park along M-33	Rose City	January 17, 2002
Rose Township Fractional District No. 5 School		3668 Cherry Street	Rose Township	April 20, 1995
Frank Sebastian Smith House		124 East Houghton Avenue (M-55)	West Branch	February 16, 1989

== Ontonagon County ==
Name	Image	Location	City	Listing date
Marsi Homestead	Marsi Homestead	45467 South Road	Bohemia Township	September 8, 1982
Methodist Episcopal Church		Minnesota Mine Location, south end of Rockland on US-45	Rockland	November 16, 1982 Burned Down and Rebuilt
Minesota Mine	Minesota Mine	SE of Rockland, off of US-45	Rockland	May 17, 1973
Ontonagon Copper Boulder Informational Site		Victoria Reservoir	Rockland	February 17, 1965
Ontonagon Lighthouse†	Ontonagon Lighthouse	Off M-64 at the mouth of the Ontonagon River	Ontonagon	May 17, 1973
Porcupine Mountains Informational Designation		Porcupine Mountains State Park, M-107, 10 miles west of Silver City	Silver City vicinity	September 17, 1975
Soo Line Railroad Depot	Soo Line Railroad Depot	Soo Line Railroad Tracks and Division Street	Trout Creek	June 15, 1979
Victoria Mining Company Town	Victoria Mining Company Town	Intersection of Victoria Dam Road and Victoria Road	Rockland vicinity	April 23, 1971
Elton B. Walker House	Elton B. Walker Home	605 Ridge Road	Mass City	April 23, 1985

== Osceola County ==
Name	Image	Location	City	Listing date
Congregational Church	Congregational Church	216 South Main Street	Hersey	June 15, 1979
Joseph W. Guyton Informational Designation	Joseph W. Guyton	Guyton Park; 308 North Main Street	Evart	June 15, 2005
John E. Larson Farm	John E. Larson Farm	20432 Mackinaw Trail	Sherman Township	June 5, 1997
Founding of Marion / Marion Mill Pond and Dam Informational Designation	Marion Mill Dam	Marion Mill Pond Park; Intersection of Water and Mill Street (M-66)	Marion	April 15, 1999
North Evart United Methodist Church	North Evart United Methodist Church	8985 90th Avenue	Osceola Township	July 20, 1984
Reed City Community Building (demolished)		Slosson Avenue at Chestnut Museum	Reed City	September 21, 1988
Swedish Evangelical Lutheran Church	Swedish Evangelical Lutheran Church	308 Michigan Avenue	Tustin	July 15, 2004
"Unto a New Land" Informational Designation	"Unto a New Land"	Southbound U.S. Route 131; Scenic overlook mile marker 170	Burdell Township	June 15, 1979

== Oscoda County ==
Name	Image	Location	City	Listing date
Mio Dam		Route No. 1, Pond Drive at the Au Sable River	Mio	2005
Oscoda County Courthouse (demolished)		311 Morenci Avenue	Mio	August 13, 1971

== Otsego County ==
Name	Image	Location	City	Listing date
First Congregational Church		218 West Second Street	Gaylord	March 16, 1989
Frank A. and Rae E. Harris Kramer House†		221 Center, SW corner of Shelden Street	Gaylord	February 18, 1993
Otsego County Informational Designation	Otsego County-Historic Site Plaque	Otsego County Courthouse, 225 W. Main (M-32) at Otsego Avenue	Gaylord	February 17, 1960
St. Mary's Catholic Church		147 North Otsego Street	Gaylord	2005

== Roscommon County ==
Name	Image	Location	City	Listing date
Eggleston School†		10539 Nolan Road	Nester Township	February 29, 1996
Gerrish Township Informational Site		2997 East Higgins Lake Drive	Gerrish Township	December 12, 1979
Pioneer House (demolished)		900 Lake Street	Roscommon	January 20, 2000
Roscommon Lumber Company / Prudenville Informational Designation		Trestle Park, M-55 at M-18	Prudenville	2014
Terney House (demolished)		603 Lake Street	Roscommon	August 24, 1978

== Schoolcraft County ==
Name	Image	Location	City	Listing date
Bishop Baraga's First Mission Church Informational Site		2.5 miles (4.0 km) North of Manistique on Leduc Road, less than .25 miles (0.40 km) west of M-94, at Arrowhead Inn Point	Manistique vicinity	April 2, 1957
Blaney Inn	Blaney Park Inn	4395 State Hwy M77	Mueller Township	July 23, 1987
Manistique Pumping Station†		Deer Street (US-2)	Manistique	March 19, 1980
Seul Choix Pointe Lighthouse†		County Road 431 at Seul Choix Pointe	Gulliver vicinity	August 21, 1987
Thompson / Christmas Tree Ship	E. L. Thompson	0.3 miles East from Thompson on US-2	Thompson Township	April 13, 2006
White Marble Lime Company Kilns	White Marble Lime Company Kiln	5055W US-2	Manistique vicinity	November 13, 1964

== Outside Michigan ==
Name	Image	Location	City	Listing date
Battle of Monterey Pass / Michigan Cavalry Brigade Informational Designation		14325 Buchanan Trail East	Waynesboro, Pennsylvania vicinity	2012
Birthplace of Kiwanis Informational Designation		3636 Woodview Trace	Indianapolis, Indiana	1982
Cadillac Museum (Musée Lamothe-Cadillac)		Lamothe Cadillac Avenue	Saint-Nicolas-de-la-Grave, France	1984
Michigan at Perryville Informational Designation		Perryville Battlefield State Park, 1825 Battlefield Road	Perryville, Kentucky	1983
Michigan at Tebbs Bend Informational Designation		Green River Hill Confederate Cemetery	Campbellsville, Kentucky	1988
Michigan Light Artillery Regiment / Batteries F and G Informational Designation		Battlefield Memorial Highway/U.S. Route 421	Richmond, Kentucky	2012
Stones River Informational Designation		Stones River National Battlefield	Murfreesboro, Tennessee	1966
Stonewall Regiment Informational Designation		8629 Reno Monument Road	Boonsboro, Maryland vicinity	1984

== See also ==
- National Register of Historic Places listings in Michigan
- List of National Historic Landmarks in Michigan
- List of Michigan State Historic Markers

== Sources ==
- Historic Sites Online. Michigan State Housing Developmental Authority. Accessed June 10, 2011.
