= List of Michigan State Historic Sites in Isabella County =

Location of Isabella County in Michigan

The following is a list of Michigan State Historic Sites in Isabella County, Michigan. Sites marked with a dagger (†) are also listed on the National Register of Historic Places in Isabella County, Michigan.

== Current listings ==
| Name | Image | Location | City | Listing date |
|---|---|---|---|---|
| Central Michigan University Informational Designation | | Adjacent to Warriner Hall, on campus | Mount Pleasant | January 19, 1957 |
| Central Michigan University's First Class Informational Site | Central Michigan University | 201 South Main Street | Mount Pleasant | March 1, 1968 |
| Doughty House† | Doughty House | 301 Chippewa St | Mount Pleasant | May 17, 1973 |
| Isaac A. Fancher Building | Issac Fancher Building | 101 E Broadway | Mount Pleasant | August 25, 1982 |
| Founding of Mount Pleasant Commemorative Designation | | 200 Main Street, corner of Mosher | Mount Pleasant | August 26, 2000 |
| Island Park Swimming Pool (demolished) | | Lincoln Street at Main Street | Mount Pleasant | November 21, 1991 |
| Mission Creek Cemetery | Mission Creek Cemetery | 1475 South Bamber Road, N of Pickard Rd., S of River Rd., on S side of Mission Creek | Mount Pleasant | April 10, 1986 |
| Peter Richmond House | Peter Richmond House | 109 West Locust | Mount Pleasant | 2016 |
| Sacred Heart Academy | | 316 East Michigan Avenue | Mount Pleasant | May 18, 1989 |
| Saint John's Episcopal Church† | Saint John's Episcopal Church-Mt. Pleasant | 206 West Maple Street | Mount Pleasant | February 11, 1972 |
| Schoolhouse† | United States Indian School | South Crawford Road, between Pickard and River Roads | Mount Pleasant | January 17, 1986 |
| Shepherd Village Power House | Village Power House | 314 West Maple Street | Shepherd | April 24, 1981 |
| Sherman City Union Church | Sherman City Union Church | Southeast corner of West Vernon and Wyman roads | Sherman City | August 3, 1979 |
| Frank S. Sweeney House | Frank Sweeney House | 304 South Washington | Mount Pleasant | June 10, 1987 |

== See also ==
- National Register of Historic Places listings in Isabella County, Michigan

== Sources ==
- Historic Sites Online – Isabella County. Michigan State Housing Developmental Authority. Accessed January 23, 2011.
