= Kramer House =

Kramer House may refer to:

in the United States (by state)

- Kramer House (Los Angeles), California, a Los Angeles Historic-Cultural Monument in the San Fernando Valley
- Kramer House (Evansville, Indiana), listed on the National Register of Historic Places in Vanderburgh County, Indiana
- Frank A. and Rae E. Harris Kramer House, Gaylord, Michigan, NRHP-listed
- Kramer House (Florissant, Missouri), listed on the National Register of Historic Places in St. Louis County, Missouri
- Raymond C. and Mildred Kramer House, Manhattan, NYC
