= Zeba Indian United Methodist Church =

Historic church in Michigan, United States

- Kewawenon Mission
- U.S. National Register of Historic Places
- Michigan State Historic Site
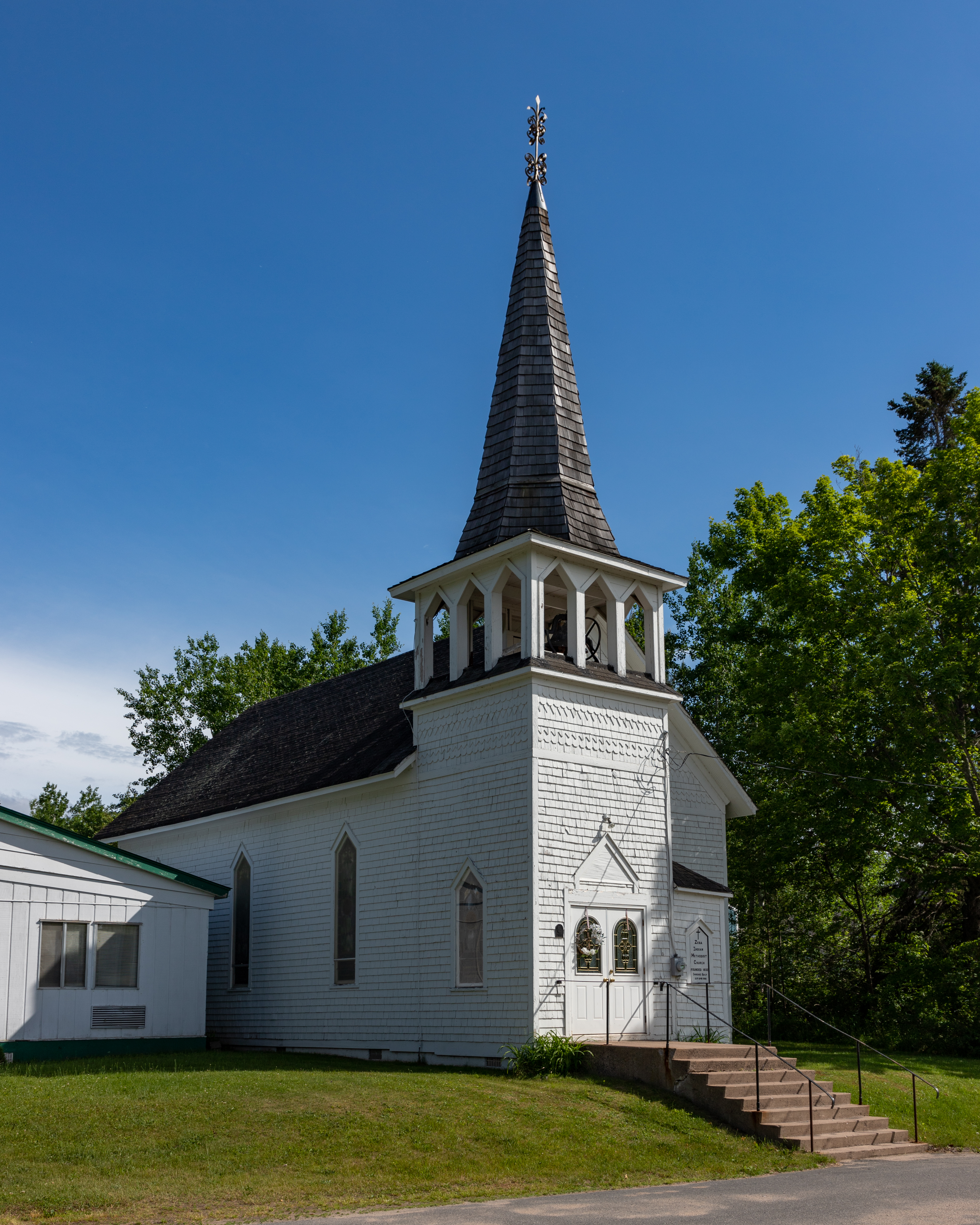
- Zeba Indian United Methodist Church, Zeba, Michigan, 2020.

- Location within Michigan Location within the United States
- Interactive map
- Location: 227 Front Street, Zeba, Michigan
- Coordinates: 46°47′37″N 88°25′41″W
- Area: 0.5 acres (0.20 ha)
- Built: 1888
- Architectural style: Gothic Revival
- NRHP reference No.: 80001847

Significant dates
- Added to NRHP: April 10, 1980
- Designated MSHS: January 29, 1979

The Zeba Indian United Methodist Church is a religious building located at 227 Front Street (between Whirl-I-Gig and Peter Marksman Roads) in Zeba, Michigan, northeast of L'Anse. It marks the site of the Kewawenon Mission, built in 1832, which was the birthplace of Indian Methodism in the western Upper Peninsula, and predated Frederic Baraga's mission at Assinins by 11 years. It was listed on the National Register of Historic Places in 1980 and designated a Michigan State Historic Site in 1979.

== History ==
Methodist missionaries arrived in this area, via Sault Ste Marie, in the first half of the 19th century. One of the earliest was John Sunday, a Chippewa pastor, who came to this site in 1832 and erected a log mission house. Reverend John Clark followed in 1834 and built a school and mission house. A number of other Methodist missionaries were assigned to what was then called the Kewawenon Mission, including Daniel Meeker Chandler, W.H. Brockway, George King, John Kahbeege, Peter Marksman, and John H. Pitezel. By 1845, the mission included a farm and church with over 60 members, the large majority of whom were Indian.

A second church was built in 1850, and was dedicated by John H. Pitezel, who had served at Kewawenon from 1844 to 1847. The mission began holding annual camp meetings in 1880, which attracted a large number of Indians from all over. A third church was constructed in 1888 at a cost of $1400, funded by donations from non-church members. This building remains on the site. An outdoor chapel was built in 1924.

Now known as the Zeba United Indian Methodist Church, the site has been in continuous operation since 1832, and represents one of the oldest and most successful integration of Christian and Native American religious traditions.

== Description ==
The Zeba Indian United Methodist Church is a vernacular Gothic Revival building, built of wood in a rectangular plan. The front facade is asymmetric, with double colored glass windows on one side and an offset square tower holding the entrance doors on the other. The facade also includes a small gable peak window and a triangular window above the entry doors. Memorial windows line each side of the church and a large rosette window is in the rear. The polygonal steeple has Gothic slits in the belfry and a wrought iron top. The exterior is sided with the original handmade wooden shingles, arranged in linear patterns.
