= Baraga County Courthouse =

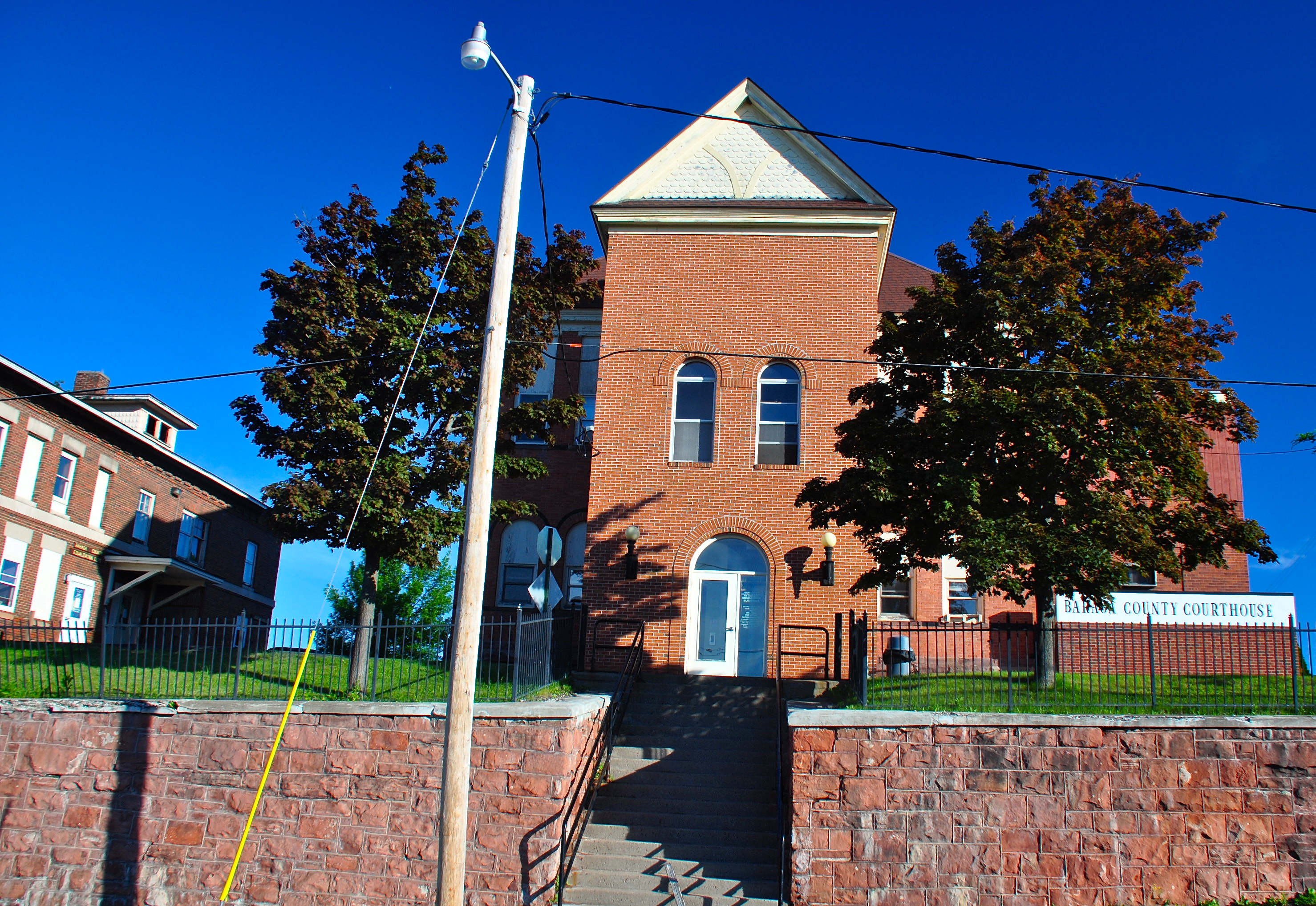
- Baraga County Courthouse and annex, July 2014.

- Location within Michigan
- 46.7577°N 88.4530°W
- Location: 16 North Third Street, L'Anse, Michigan

History
- Built: 1884-85

Site notes
- Architect: William Appleyard
- Architectural style: Late Victorian
- Governing body: Government

Michigan State Historic Site
- Designated: June 21, 1985

The Baraga County Courthouse is the seat of government for Baraga County, Michigan, located at 16 North Third Street in L'Anse. (Note: The Michigan State Historic Site listing states 16 South Third Street) The courthouse and adjacent annex are designated a Michigan State Historic Site. As of 2012, the courthouse operates courtrooms for the 12th Circuit Court, 97th District Court, and Baraga County Probate Court.

== History ==
On February 19, 1875, Baraga County was established with L'Anse as the county seat. Until the construction of a county jail in 1883, the county operated in rented commercial space. The courthouse was built from 1884 through 1885 at a bid price of $11,945. It was designed by architect William Appleyard and built with John B. Sweatt as contractor.

Adjacent to the building is the courthouse annex, which was built as the replacement jail in 1912. At some later point, the jail was condemned and converted to county offices. The property, including the courthouse and annex, was designated a Michigan State Historic Site on June 21, 1985.

A special election was held on August 2, 2011, to decide a millage to move the courthouse to the former Baraga County Memorial Hospital or a new facility. The poor condition of the building and maintenance expenses were cited as reasons to change facilities. However, the proposal was rejected 923 to 507. On February 28, 2012, a second ballot considering the issue was rejected 1195 to 541.

After purchasing the hospital was rejected, the county decided to purchase the former L'Anse Pharmacy building, located about a block from the courthouse. The building was acquired in June 2012 and the county secured financing for the purchase in August. Several offices are scheduled to be moved to the pharmacy in September. The annex will be demolished, though a time has not yet been set.

== Description ==
The courthouse is a two-story red brick structure in the Late Victorian style topped by a hip-and-gable roof. The first story windows are round-head while the second story's are square-head. The adjacent two-story annex is a long and narrow hip-roofed structure. The buildings are atop a small hill.

== See also ==
- List of Michigan State Historic Sites in Baraga County, Michigan
