= The Sweeney House =

Frank S. Sweeney House
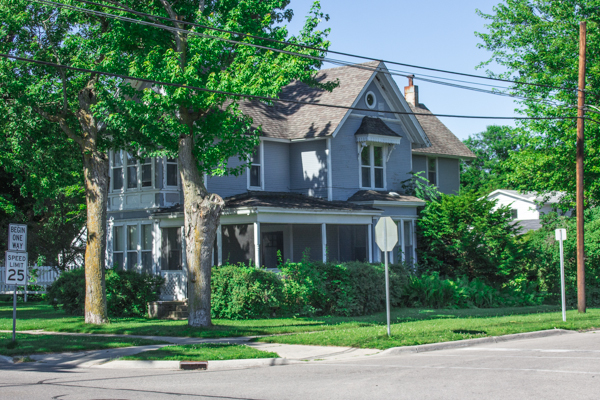

- Location within Michigan
- 43°36′9″N 84°46′41″W
- Location: 304 South Washington, Mount Pleasant, Michigan

Michigan State Historic Site
- Designated: June 10, 1987
- Reference no.: P23596

The Sweeney House is a Michigan State Historic Site that was built in 1888 by Frank S. Sweeney.

== Location ==
The Sweeney House is located at 304 South Washington, Mount Pleasant, Isabella County, Michigan, and is currently owned and operated by the estate of Elizabeth C. Sweeney and Mark. A. Mumford.

== History ==
Frank S. Sweeney, a native of Scarborough, Ontario, came to Michigan in 1868 and found work first as a stave manufacturer and later as a surveyor of timber lands in Saginaw and Bay City, Michigan. Sweeney moved to Mt. Pleasant in the spring of 1881, and for the next half-century operated a grocery, produce, crockery and seed business in Mt. Pleasant under the name of Sweeney and Company. Sweeney was elected City treasurer in 1883 and 1884. In 1887 Sweeney purchased land from his partner John Barry and constructed the present stately frame residence the next year. The Frank S. Sweeney House has historical significance as the residence of a prominent Mt. Pleasant grocer, merchant and civic official.

== Design ==
The Sweeney House is designed to be an asymmetrically shaped, two-and-one-half-story, cross-gable, Stick-style clapboard building, resting on a stone foundation. It has squared one and two-story bays, a shed-roofed enclosed porch, one-over-one double hung windows, and is crowned with an asphalt shingled roof.
