= Assinins, Michigan =

- Assinins
- U.S. National Register of Historic Places
- U.S. Historic district
- Michigan State Historic Site
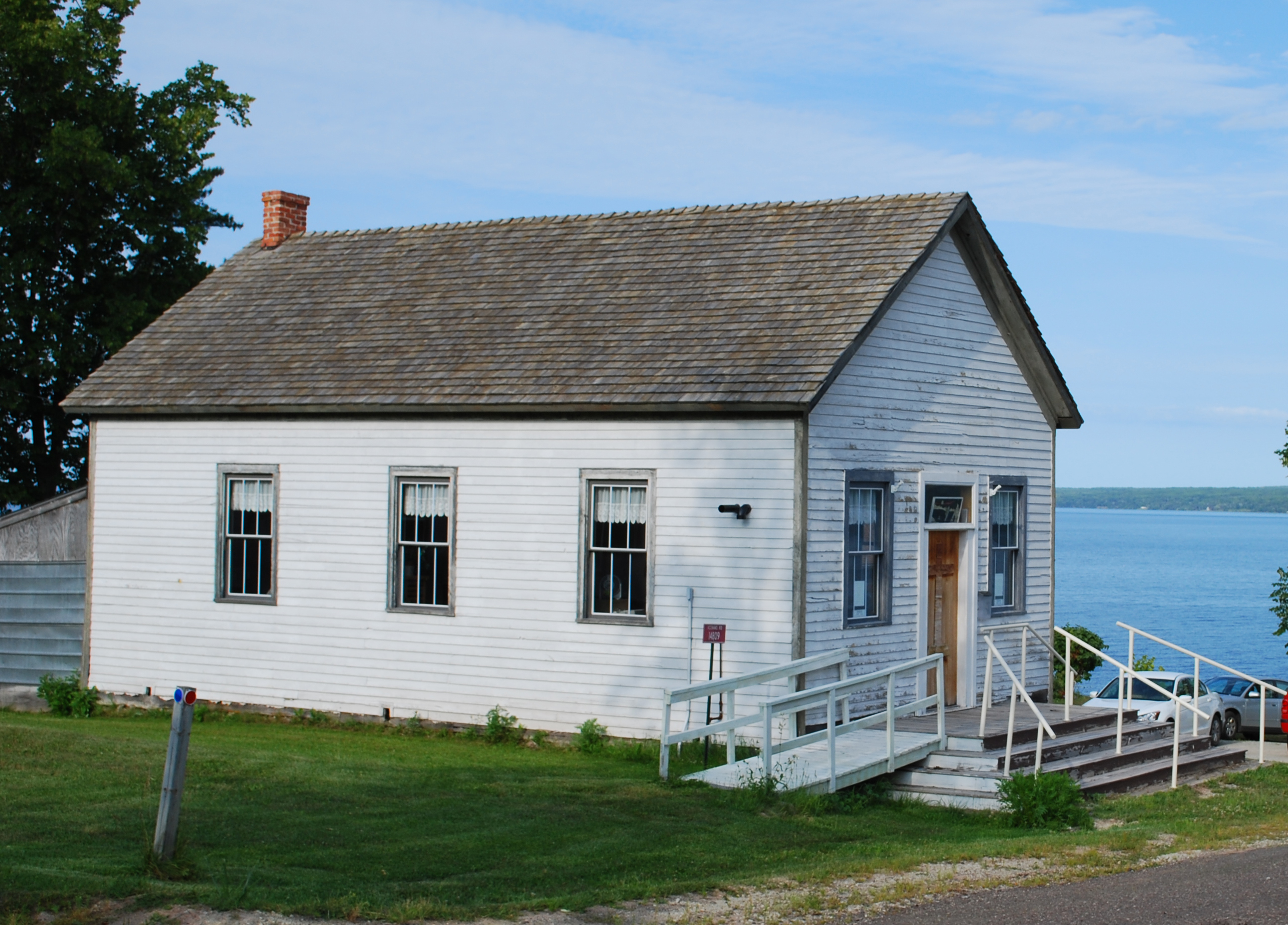
- House in Assinins

- Location within Michigan Location within the United States
- Interactive map
- Location: US 41, Assinins, Michigan
- Coordinates: 46°48′43″N 88°28′33″W
- Architect: Fr. Frederic Baraga
- NRHP reference No.: 72000591

Significant dates
- Added to NRHP: May 19, 1972
- Designated MSHS: June 19, 1971

Assinins (Ojibwe: Asiniinsikaajiigibiig) is a historic district consisting of several buildings that were originally a school and orphanage, located in Assinins, Michigan. The district was listed on the National Register of Historic Places in 1972.

== History ==
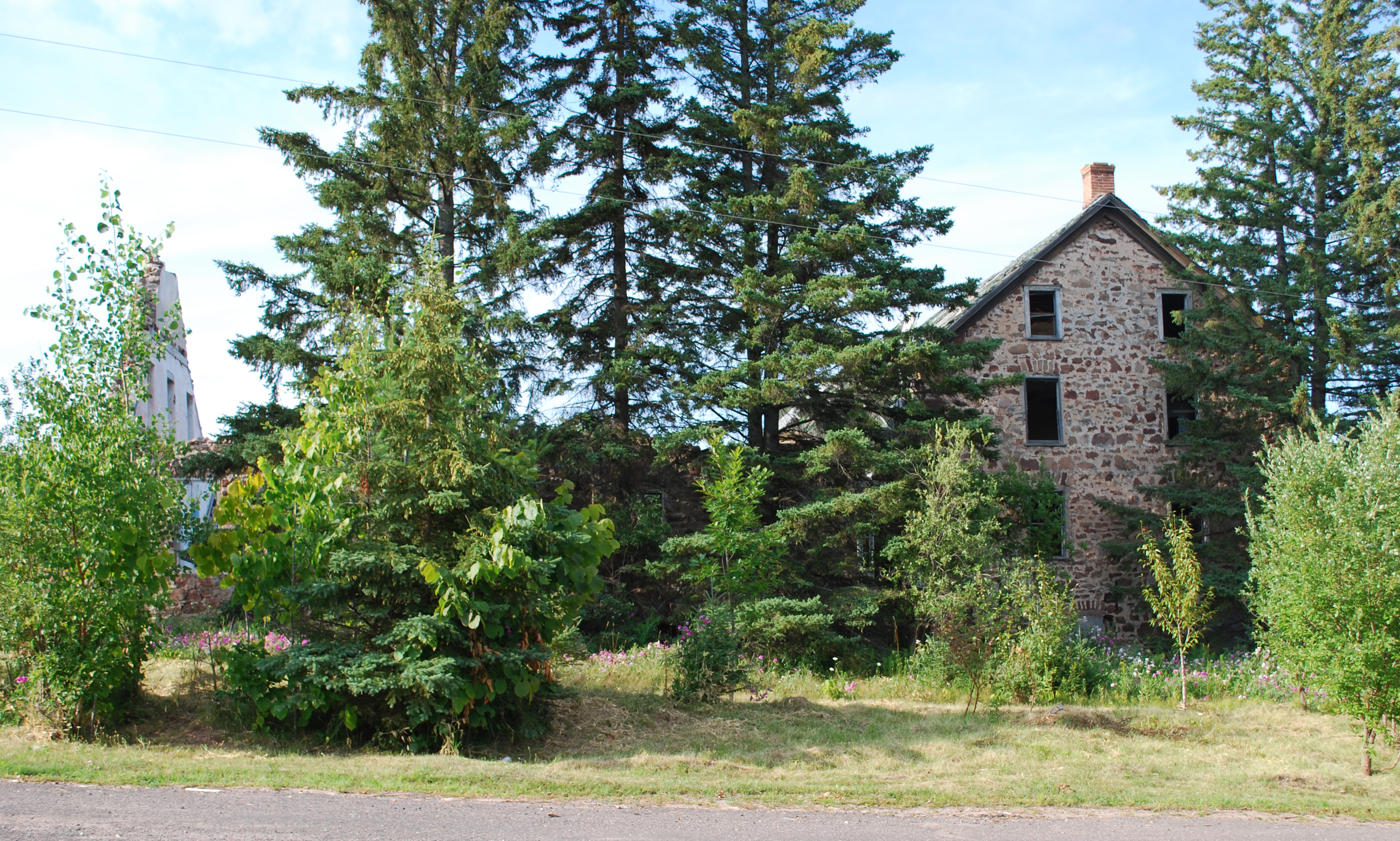
Buildings in Assinins

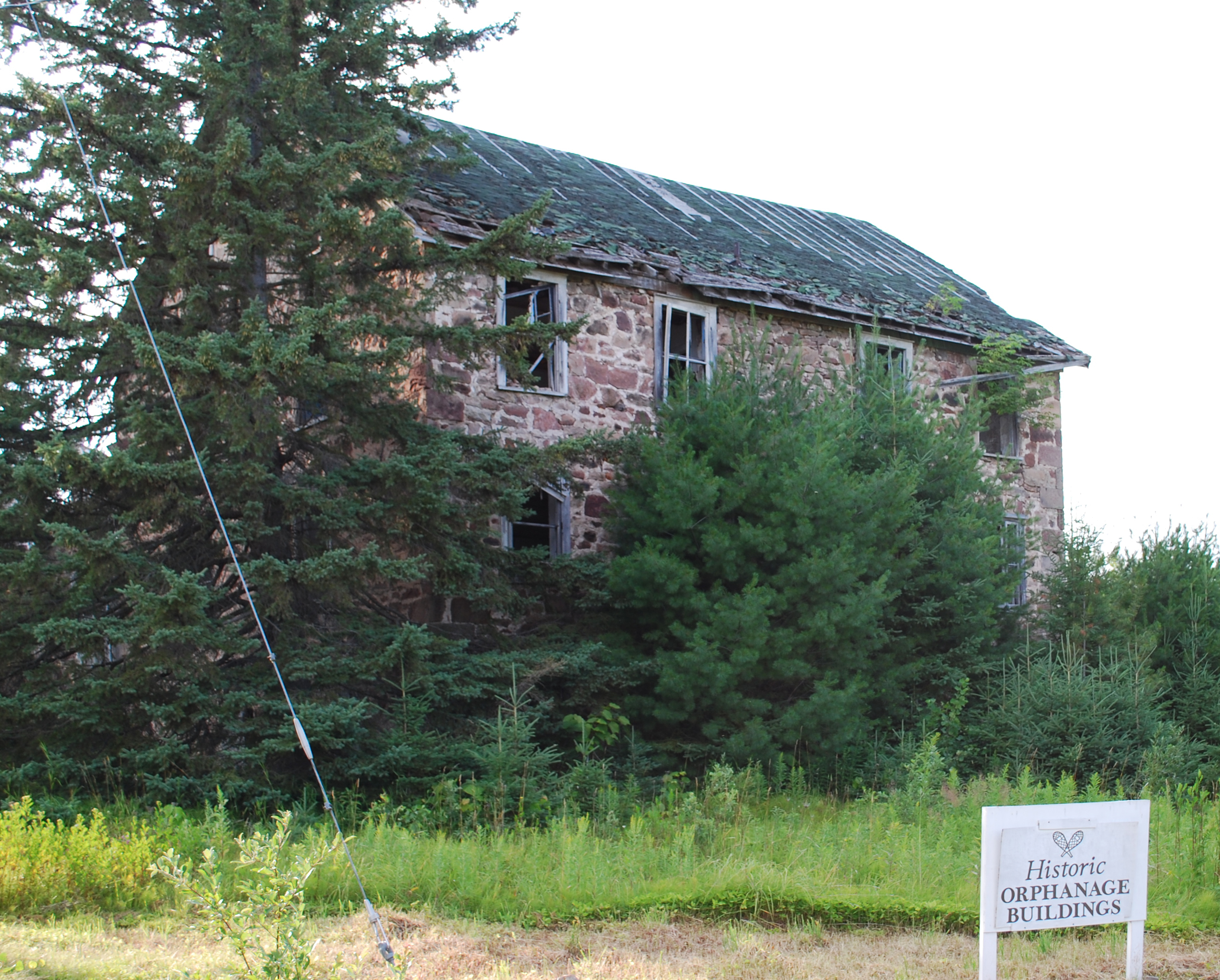
Orphanage building

Assinins was founded in 1843 by Bishop Frederic Baraga, who came to the area at the invitation of Chief Edward Assinins. Assinins was the first person to be baptized at the site. Baraga built the Old St. Joseph Orphanage and School on the site in 1860; wings were added to the building in 1866 and 1877. After the Civil War, Baraga gave the complex's land and buildings to Chief Assinins and the Keweenaw band of the Chippewa Native Americans. The orphanage housed both Native American and European children; a larger orphanage was built on the site in 1929. In 1957, the complex was rededicated as the Sacred Heart Friary by the Capuchin Fathers as their novitiate until the late 1960s. The site was then used as the KBIC tribal Center and was later torn down.

== Significance ==
The complex at Assinins is one of the earliest Catholic missions in the Upper Peninsula associated with Bishop Frederic Baraga, and served as an important link for establishing rapport between the local Ottawa and Chippewa tribes and settlers arriving from the east. Baraga helped the local tribes to establish recognized self-governance, and to purchase land in their own names, establishing the tribe's members as local citizens. The site holds some of the oldest structures in the area, and Bishop Baraga wrote some of his best-known works, including a book on Chippewa grammar and a Chippewa dictionary, while staying in Assinins.

== Description ==
The site at Assinins originally consisted of multiple buildings, including over 15 log cabins, spread over approximately 500 acres (2.0 km^{2}). It currently consists of a school building (now used as a warehouse) and several orphanage buildings. The largest structure is the Old St. Joseph Orphanage and School, which stands three stories tall, and is built of rubble with a dormered gable roof. Nearby is a cemetery holding the graves of missionaries Father Gerhard Terhorst, Monsignor Melchior Faust, Father John Henn, and Father Anthony Vermare.
