= Minesota Mine =

Copper mine in Michigan, United States

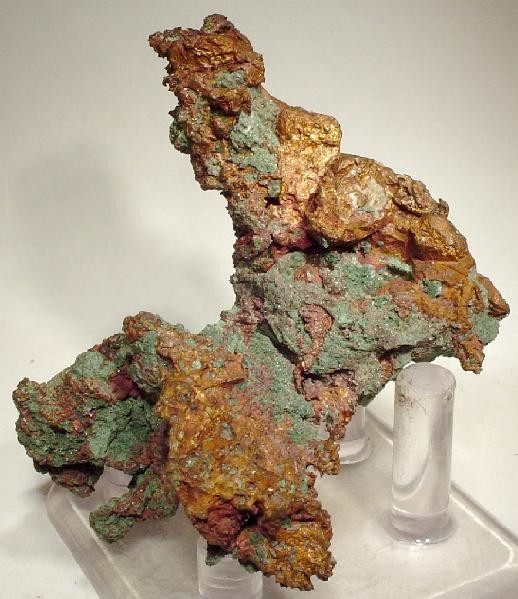
- Native copper on matrix from the Minesota Mine. Size 6.8 x 6.0 x 4.8 cm.

- Location within Michigan
- Location: SE of Rockland, Michigan, United States; 46°43.796′N 89°10.496′W
- Products: Copper
- Type: Underground
- Greatest depth: 1,200 feet
- Opened: 1847
- Closed: 1876
- Michigan State Historic Site

The Minesota Mine is a former copper mine near Rockland, Ontonagon County in the Upper Peninsula of the U.S. state of Michigan. The Minesota (the single "n" in the name was a mistake in the original incorporation papers) was one of the most productive and famous early mines in the Michigan Copper Country.

== Geology ==
Like almost all other Copper Country mines, the mineral sought was native copper. Some silver was said to have been recovered in the upper workings. Other minerals in the ore, but which had no economic importance include quartz, calcite, epidote, pumpellyite, chlorite and feldspar.

== History ==
The Minesota fissure vein was discovered in 1847 when prospectors found a six-ton (5.4 mt) mass of native copper in a pit dug by aboriginal miners. In the pit was growing a hemlock nearly 400 years old by the number of growth rings. Mining began in 1848, and from 1855 through 1862, the Minesota was the most productive copper mine in the United States. The mine had ten shafts, the deepest of which extended to a depth of 1200 feet (366 m). In 1856, miners tunneled into a 527-ton (478 mt) mass of native copper, the second-largest such mass found in the Copper Country. Besides masses of copper recovered through hand-sorting, the mine ran a small stamp mill to recover finer-grained copper in ore that ran 3%.

In 1870, the rich massive copper had been worked out, and the depth of the mine shafts had reached the limit of the hoisting equipment. At the same time, the price of copper dropped to $0.19 per pound, down from a high of $0.55 in 1864. Rather than invest in new equipment and explore for new ore bodies, the company stopped working the mine, and turned it over to tributers – independent miners who paid for the privilege of mining, usually paying a share of the ore they took out. The mine continued to be profitable to tributers, who took out 270 tons (245 mt) of copper in 1870, the same year that the mine closed. In 1876, the Minesota company paid a final dividend and went out of business, having paid a total of $1.82 million in dividends, versus $456,000 in assessments.

"It is true that such recollections must be taken with a grain of salt, as the miner sees through the vista of backward years with an eye that wonderfully magnifies mineral values, and in the course of time any abandoned mine gets the name of having been rich; but in the case of the Minnesota [sic] there is reliable evidence that the mine was abandoned through faint-heartedness, and not because it was worked out."

- Horace J. Stevens, 1902, The Copper Handbook, p.196-197.

Through the end of the 1800s tributers continued to pick copper out of that part of the old workings that remained above water level. Through 1888, the mine had yielded 17,352 tons (15,742 mt) of copper, as well as 533 pounds of silver. In 1899 the property was acquired by the Michigan Mining Company, which also bought the nearby Rockland and Superior mines. In 1903, the Michigan company opened the Calico amygdaloid, which held 3% copper ore, and outcropped on the Minesota property only 140 feet (43m) from the outcrop of the Minesota fissure vein.

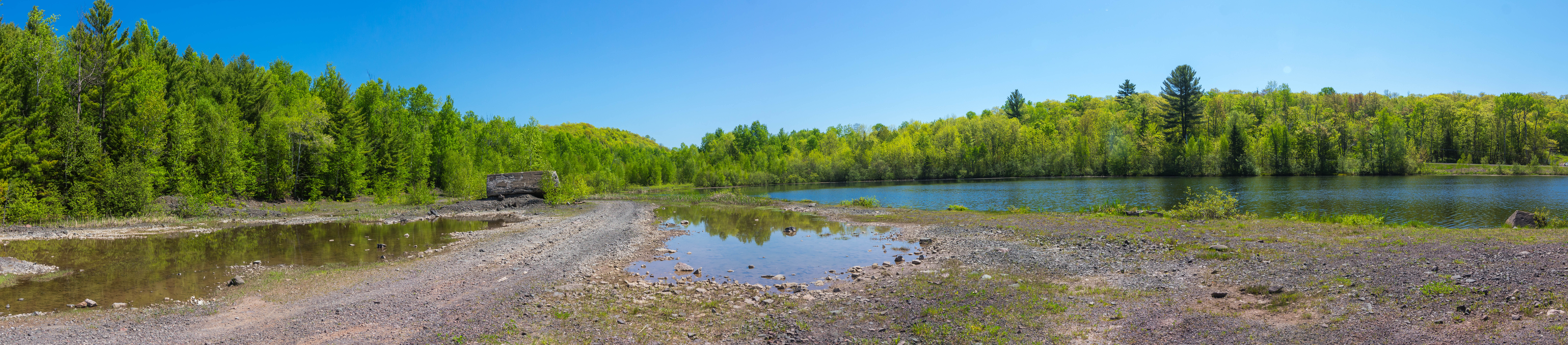
Minesota Mine Site Panoramic

== See also ==
- Copper mining in Michigan
