= Marlborough Historic District =

Historic district in Michigan, United States

- U.S. National Register of Historic Places
- U.S. Historic district
- Michigan State Historic Site
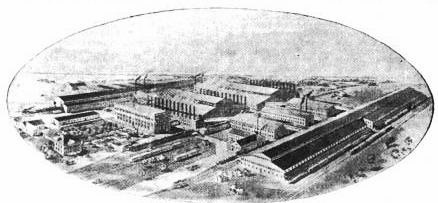
- Great Northern Portland Cement Co, c. 1907

- Location within Michigan Location within the United States
- Interactive map
- Location: Pleasant Plains Township, Michigan
- Coordinates: 43°51′40″N 85°50′17″W
- Area: 80 acres (32 ha)
- Architect: Howard H. Parsons, Great Northern Portland Cement Co.; Marlborough Land & Investment Co.
- NRHP reference No.: 72000630

Significant dates
- Added to NRHP: September 7, 1972
- Designated MSHS: October 10, 1971

The Marlborough Historic District is a cement factory located on James Road in Pleasant Plains Township, Michigan. It was designated a Michigan State Historic Site in 1971 and listed on the National Register of Historic Places in 1972.

== History ==
In the 1890s, the Great Northern Portland Cement Company constructed a cement plant at this site to produce cement from the local marl. Production boomed, and in 1902, the company also began construction of a nearby village, dubbed Marlborough, for plant workers. By 1905, Marlborough had 400 citizens. However, problems quickly arose, as the produced cement was inferior, production was costly, and the enormous energy demands of the plant required construction of the largest power plant in the Lower Peninsula. The Great Northern Portland Cement Company entered receivership in 1906, and the village houses were sold for salvage. The plant was dynamited for scrap iron, and by 1910 only the ruins of the plant remained.

== Description ==
The ruins of the Great Northern Portland Cement Company plant and the nearby town of Marlborough are spread over an 80-acre (32 ha) plot of land. Marlborough once contained 72 houses, an opera house, school and post office, and an 88-room hotel. none remain. The cement plant was constructed almost entirely using reinforced concrete; the storage warehouse was several hundred feet in length, and the plant held six kilns and fourteen grinding mills.
