= Winter Inn =

- U.S. National Register of Historic Places
- Michigan State Historic Site
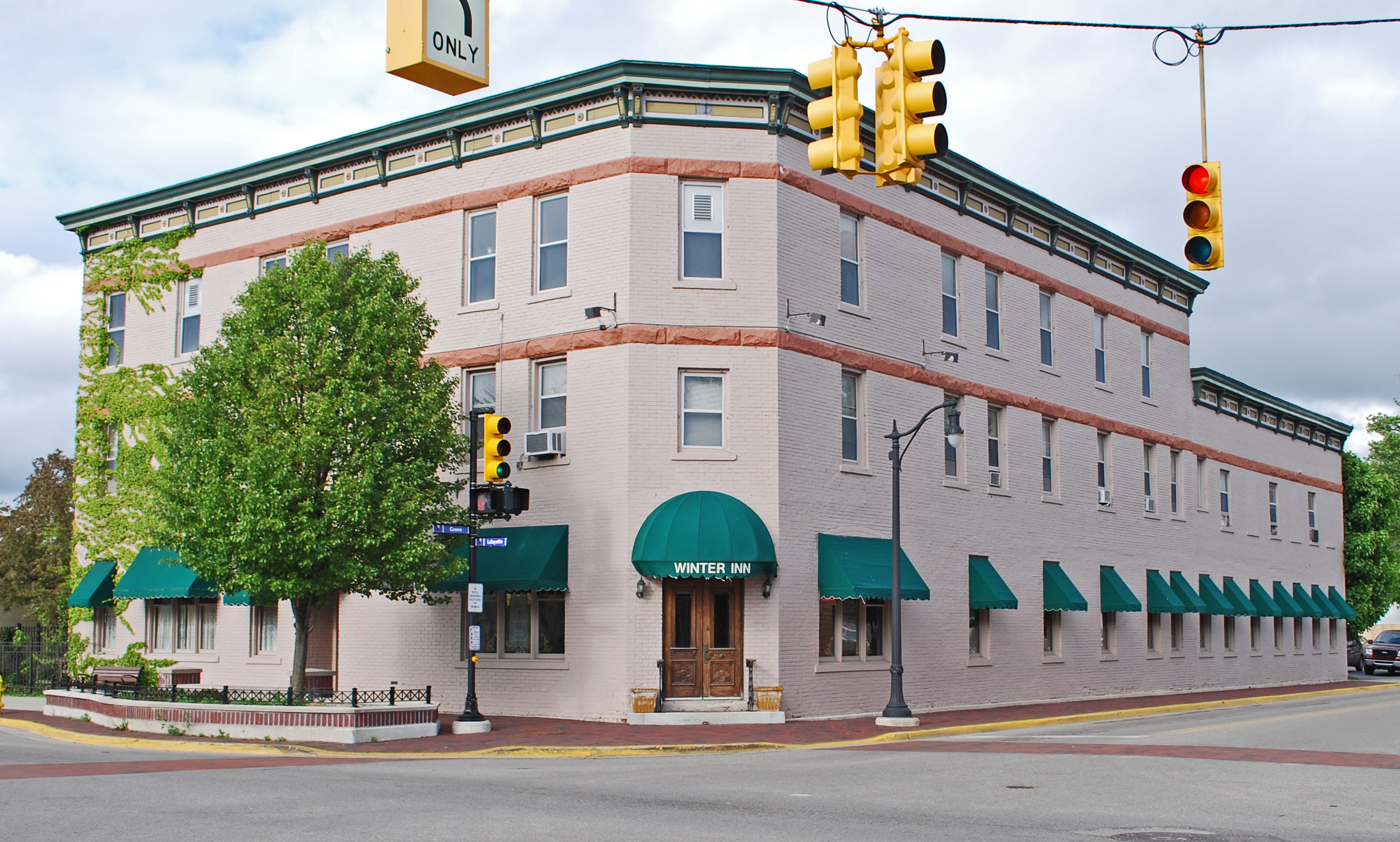

- Location within Michigan Location within the United States
- Interactive map
- Location: 100 N. Lafayette St., Greenville, Michigan
- Coordinates: 43°10′52″N 85°15′9″W
- Area: less than one acre
- Built: 1902
- Architectural style: Late Victorian Vernacular
- NRHP reference No.: 80001883

Significant dates
- Added to NRHP: April 17, 1980
- Designated MSHS: September 10, 1979

The Winter Inn is a hotel located at 100 N. Lafayette Street in Greenville, Michigan. It was designated a Michigan State Historic Site in 1979 and listed on the National Register of Historic Places in 1980. The building is significant as a still-functioning example of a modest, locally owned hotel of a type once common in small towns like Greenville.

== History ==
T.B. Winter, c1896

A string of different hotel buildings were constructed on this site beginning in 1850. These included two successive structures known as the Rossman House hotels, the Merritt House, and the Webster House (later renamed the Northern Hotel). The Northern House was destroyed by fire in 1900, and its owner, Thomas B. Winter, then constructed the present building in 1901-02. He added a rear wing containing a dance hall in 1902-03. The Winter Inn served as a small, locally owned hotel under a string of owners until 1978, when it suffered a fire. After the fire, the inn was restored to its original 1902 appearance and reopened in 1980.

== Description ==
The Winter Inn is a three-story, L-shaped red brick Late Victorian Vernacular hotel with a flat roof. The construction is generally utilitarian, with external decoration confined to brownstone beltcourses above the second and third story windows and a metal-bracketed cornice. Most windows are asymmetrically-arranged one-over-one sash windows, but three arched tripartite windows with leaded glass fanlights are arranged on the first floor. There is a double-door entrance at the canted corner.
