= Eggleston School =

Historic house in Michigan, United States

- U.S. National Register of Historic Places
- Michigan State Historic Site
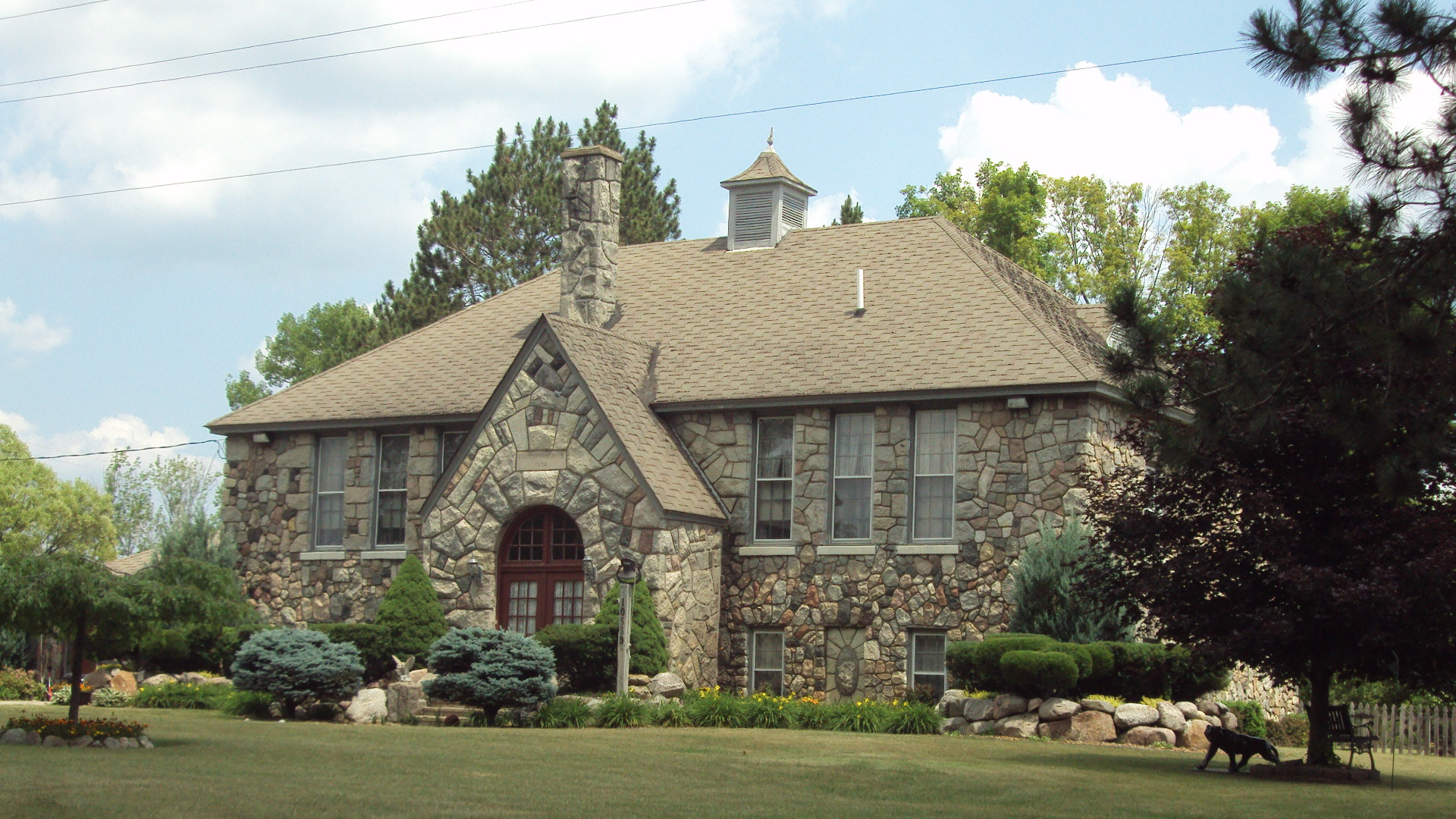

- Location within Michigan Location within the United States
- Interactive map
- Location: 10539 Nolan Road; Nester Township, Michigan, US
- Coordinates: 44°11′47″N 84°28′41″W
- Built: 1934
- NRHP reference No.: 96000368

Significant dates
- Added to NRHP: April 4, 1996
- Designated MSHS: February 29, 1996

The Eggleston School is former school and current private residential structure located at the 10539 Nolan Road in rural Nester Township in southeastern Roscommon County, Michigan. It was designated as a Michigan Historic Site on February 29, 1996, and soon after added to the National Register of Historic Places on April 4, 1996. The school is particularly notable for the finely crafted fieldstone exterior, constructed of blocks with various shapes, sizes, and hues. It is the only property in Roscommon County listed on the National Register and one of only four county properties designated as a Michigan Historic Site — along with Gerrish Township Information Site, Pioneer House, and Turney House.

== History ==
The Eggleston School is located at the corner of Nolan Road and Muma Road in section 19 of the very sparsely populated Nester Township. This location was once the village of Nolan, founded in 1890 near the end of the lumber boom in northern Michigan. Nolan had a peak population of around 80 in 1905, In 1910, the Nester Township Unit School District No. 3 apparently came into possession of the one-acre property where this school now stands. The masonry structure now standing here was built in 1934 to serve as a schoolhouse for the few residents of the township. The school and its property were financed by the township's largest landowner, Mary Eggleston.

The Nestor Township District merged with the Houghton Lake Public Schools in 1959–60, and the school decommissioned. It served as a town hall until 1974, and then was used as a hunting lodge. In 1992, it was converted into a private residence. The few students in the area now attend Houghton Lake Community Schools about 20 miles (32 km) northwest in Houghton Lake.

== Description ==
The Eggleston School is a broad-fronted, hip-roof school building on a concrete-fieldstone foundation which originally contained two classrooms upstairs and an auditorium/gymnasium/cafeteria room downstairs, before it was converted to a single-family residence. The school is particularly notable for the finely crafted fieldstone exterior, containing blocks of various shapes, sizes, and hues. All of the walls, and in particular the facade of the entrance vestibule, have a mosaic-like quality due to the purposefully fitted stones. The school contains 33 double-hung, six-over-six windows, and the roof contains three eyebrow dormers and a pyramid-roof cupola. A projecting one-story gabled vestibule in the center of the facade contains a double-door entrance.

Inside, staircases lead up to the main level and down to the basement. When built, the school included two classrooms, two restrooms, a coatroom, and a library upstairs. The lower level contained a large open space was used as a gymnasium, auditorium, and cafeteria, as well as a kitchen, a mechanical room; and a small room used by the maintenance man as an apartment. The interior of the school has been refurbished into a private residence, but he upper floor retains the original floor plan, as well as all of the interior doors, woodwork and door hardware.

The school stands on five acres (2.3 ha) of land that also includes a small cemetery, which contains seven burials, only three of them in marked graves.
