= Holtz Site =

Archaeological site in Michigan, United States

- U.S. National Register of Historic Places
- Michigan State Historic Site
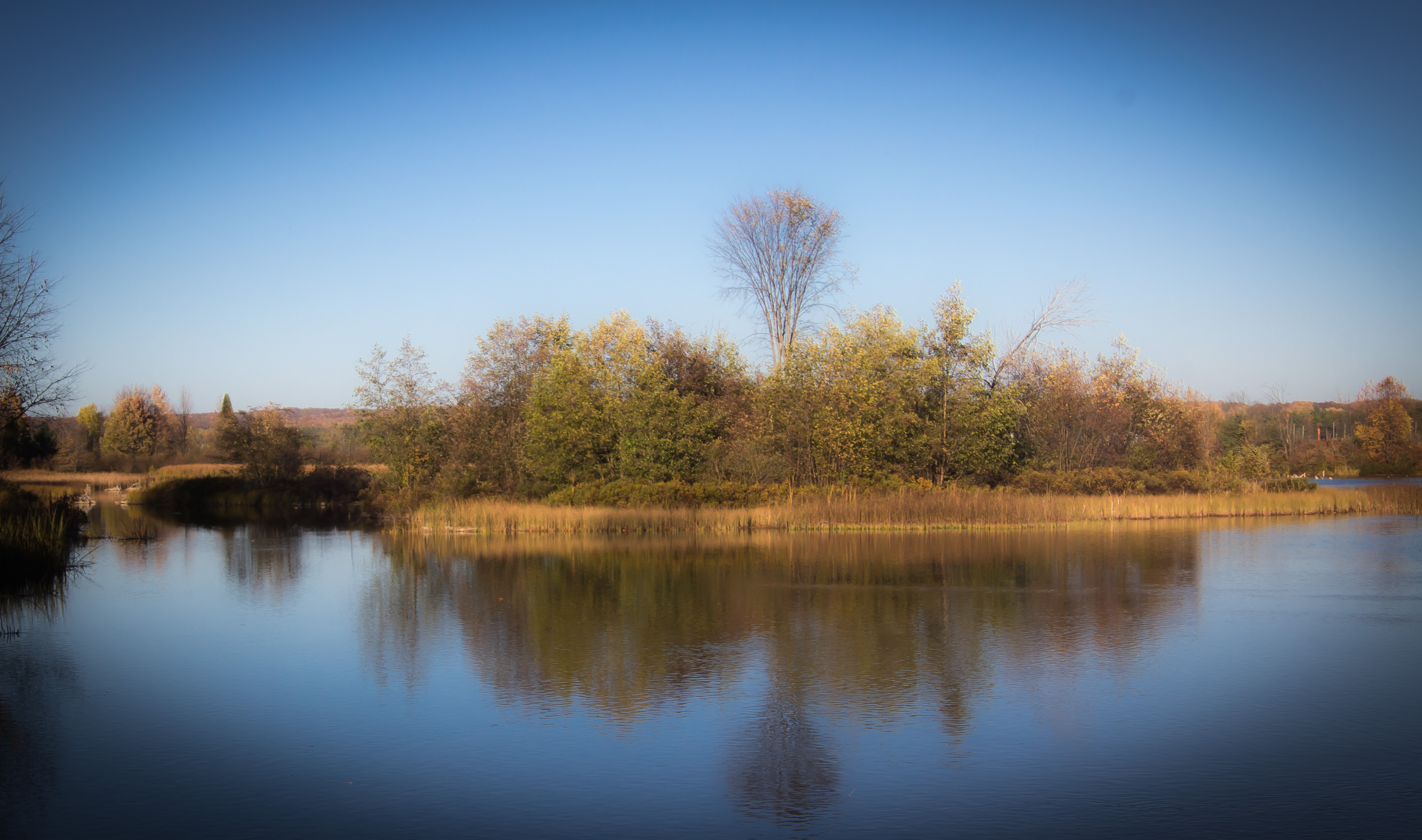

- Location within Michigan Location within the United States
- Interactive map
- Nearest city: Bellaire, Michigan
- Coordinates: 44°58′53″N 85°12′17″W
- Area: 25 acres (10 ha)
- NRHP reference No.: 73002151

Significant dates
- Added to NRHP: June 19, 1973
- Designated MSHS: December 11, 1970

The Holtz Site, designated 20AN26, is an archaeological site in Bellaire, Michigan. It is located on a former island in the Intermediate River. The site is surrounded by low, swampy areas.

== Description ==
The Holtz Site is located on the bank of the Intermediate River on what once was as island, surrounded by low, swampy ground. Five different features were discovered at the site. These were:

- A small hearth measuring about 1.4 by 1.5 feet
- A concentration of potsherds
- A modern fire pit
- Materials associated with hearth activities, but no the hearth itself
- A second concentration of pottery.

The sherds belonged to at least 11 distinct pottery vessels, of which six were complete enough for identification of features. Several projectile points were also recovered from the site.

== History ==
The materials present at the site indicate that it was occupied late in the Middle Woodland period.

The site was excavated in 1967 by researchers from Michigan State University. Artifacts found on the site indicate it was a Middle Woodland period encampment, dating to around AD 200–400. It was likely inhabited for a short time by people from southern Michigan who traveled north for a season.

The site was designated a Michigan State Historic Site in 1970 and listed on the National Register of Historic Places in 1973.
