= Nester Township, Michigan =

- Civil township
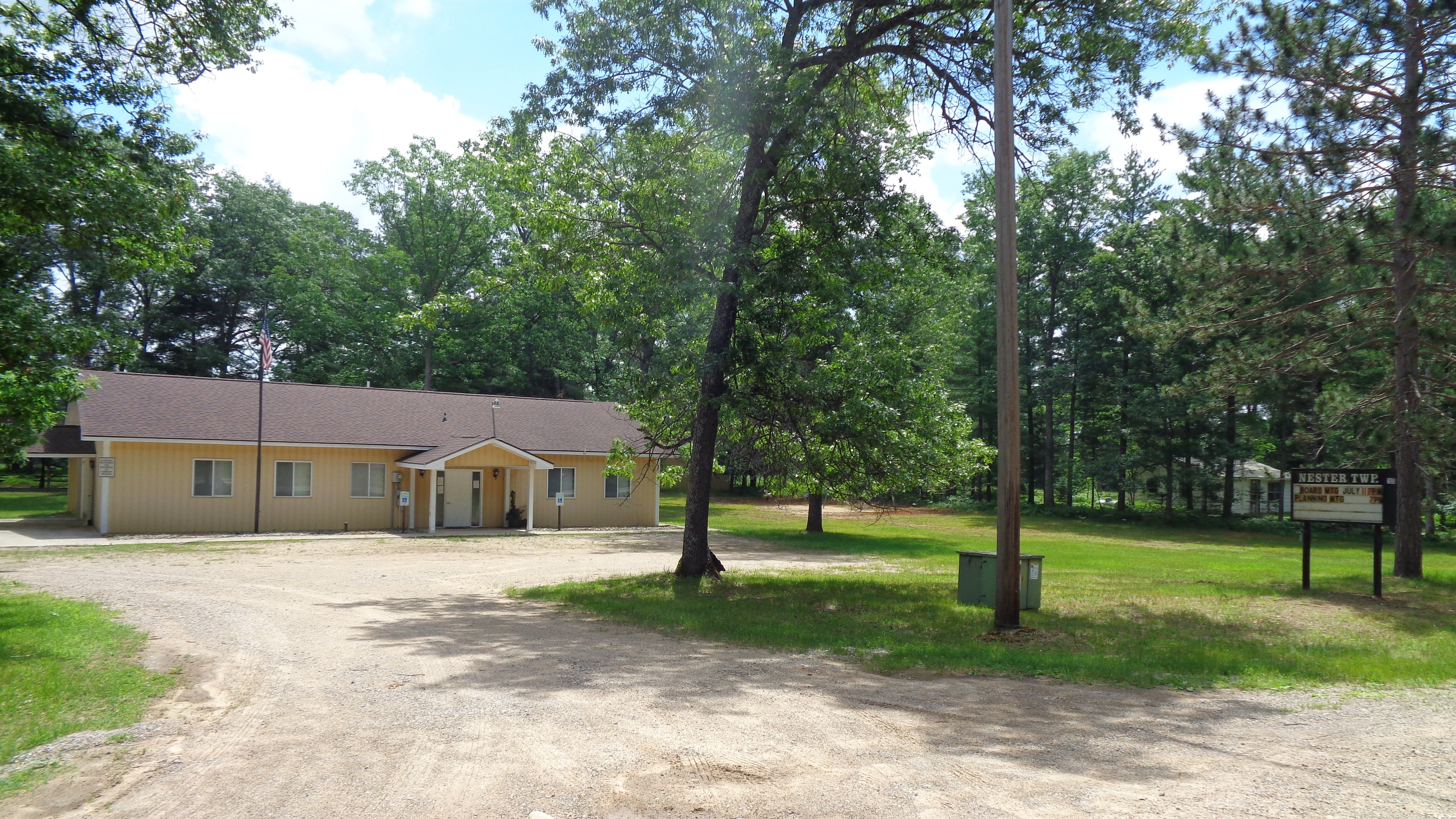
- Nester Township Hall

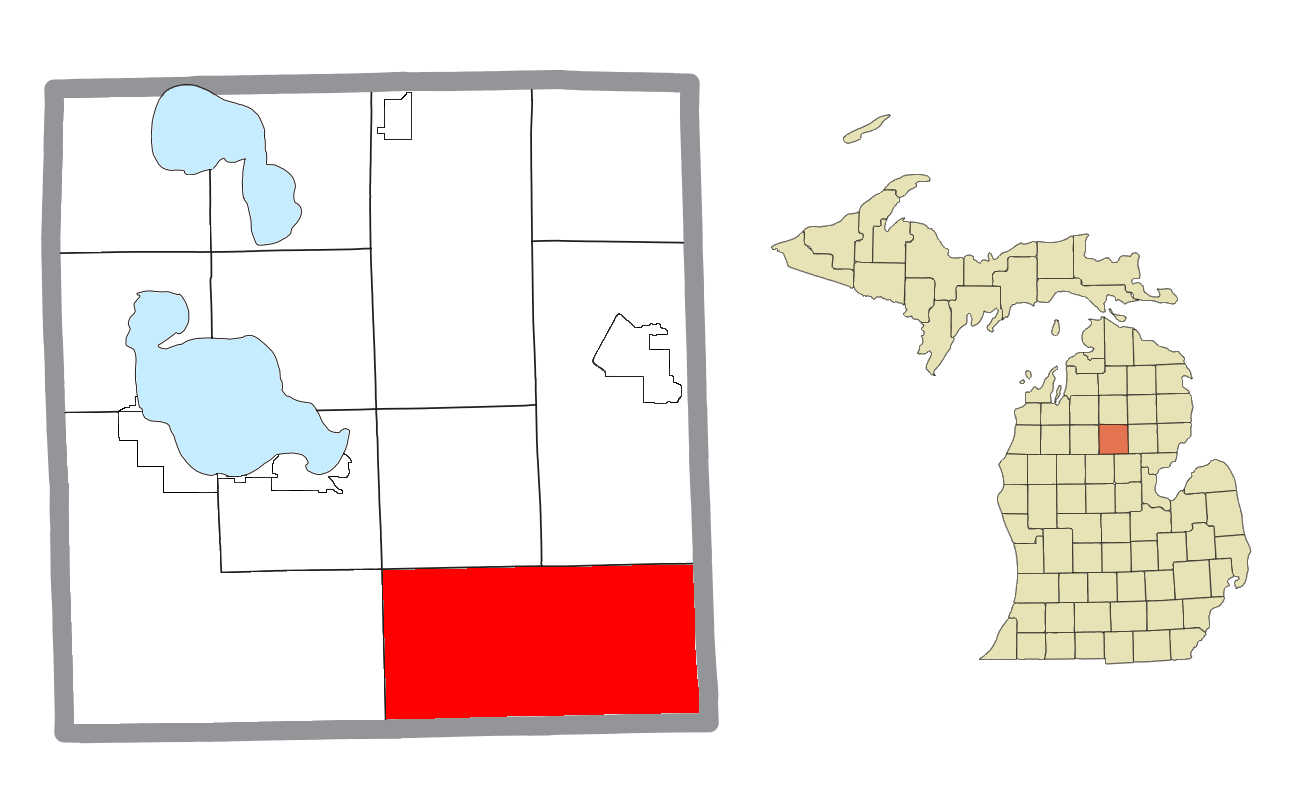
- Location within Roscommon County

- Location within the state of Michigan Nester Township (the United States)
- Coordinates: 44°11′50″N 84°29′41″W
- Country: United States
- State: Michigan
- County: Roscommon

Government
  - Supervisor: Mark Kirby
  - Clerk: Maryanne Wick

Area
  - Total: 72.26 sq mi (187.2 km^{2})
  - Land: 71.35 sq mi (184.8 km^{2})
  - Water: 0.91 sq mi (2.4 km^{2})
- Elevation: 1,150 ft (350 m)

Population (2020)
  - Total: 262
  - Density: 3.67/sq mi (1.42/km^{2})
- Time zone: UTC-5 (Eastern (EST))
  - Summer (DST): UTC-4 (EDT)
- ZIP code(s): 48624 (Gladwin); 48651 (Prudenville); 48656 (St. Helen)
- Area code: 989
- FIPS code: 26-56980
- GNIS feature ID: 1626793
- Website: Official website

Nester Township is a civil township of Roscommon County in the U.S. state of Michigan. The population was 262 at the 2020 census.

Nester was named after Thomas Nester, a businessperson in the local logging industry. The township contains the Eggleston School, the only property in the county listed on the National Register of Historic Places.

== Communities ==
- Achill is a former settlement that had its own post office from December 10, 1878 until June 11, 1884.

== Geography ==
According to the U.S. Census Bureau, the township has a total area of 72.26 square miles (187.15 km^{2}), of which 71.35 square miles (184.80 km^{2}) is land and 0.91 square miles (2.36 km^{2}) (1.26%) is water.

== Demographics ==
As of the census of 2000, there were 263 people, 119 households, and 91 families residing in the township. The population density was 3.7 per square mile (1.4/km^{2}). There were 441 housing units at an average density of 6.2 per square mile (2.4/km^{2}). The racial makeup of the township was 98.48% White, 1.14% Asian, and 0.38% from two or more races.

There were 119 households, out of which 14.3% had children under the age of 18 living with them, 71.4% were married couples living together, 2.5% had a female householder with no husband present, and 23.5% were non-families. 22.7% of all households were made up of individuals, and 6.7% had someone living alone who was 65 years of age or older. The average household size was 2.21 and the average family size was 2.55.

In the township the population was spread out, with 15.2% under the age of 18, 3.0% from 18 to 24, 20.9% from 25 to 44, 40.3% from 45 to 64, and 20.5% who were 65 years of age or older. The median age was 52 years. For every 100 females, there were 115.6 males. For every 100 females age 18 and over, there were 118.6 males.

The median income for a household in the township was $31,250, and the median income for a family was $38,750. Males had a median income of $21,806 versus $31,875 for females. The per capita income for the township was $14,645. About 10.4% of families and 15.3% of the population were below the poverty line, including 12.8% of those under the age of eighteen and 4.3% of those 65 or over.
