= John Henn =

American volleyball player (1941–2020)

Medal record

Men's volleyball

Representing the United States

Pan American Games
Gold medal – first place	1967 Winnipeg	Team

John Thomas Henn (October 2, 1941 – March 22, 2020), also known as Jack Henn, was an American volleyball player who competed in the 1968 Summer Olympics. He was born in Evansville, Indiana. He died on March 22, 2020.
