= Sherman City Union Church =

Historic church in Michigan, United States

- U.S. National Register of Historic Places
- Michigan State Historic Site
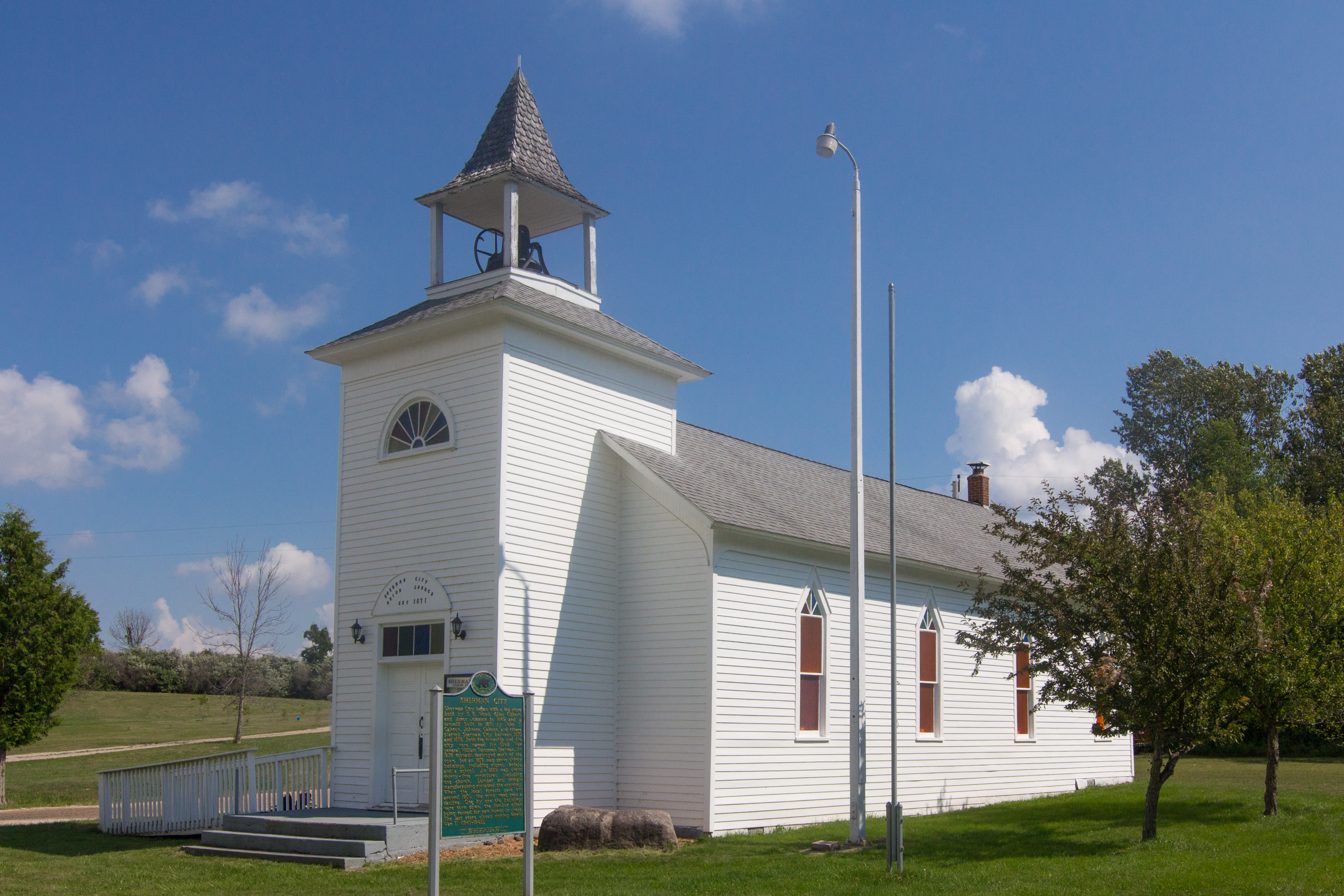

- Location within Michigan Location within the United States
- Interactive map
- Location: 11429 W. Vernon Rd., Sherman City, Michigan
- Coordinates: 43°43′35″N 85°4′34″W
- Area: less than one acre
- Built: 1885
- Built by: William L. Shupe
- Architectural style: Gothic Revival
- NRHP reference No.: 04000645

Significant dates
- Added to NRHP: June 22, 2004
- Designated MSHS: August 3, 1979

Sherman City Union Church is a historic church at 11429 West Vernon Road in Sherman City, Michigan. It was designated a Michigan State Historic Site in 1979 and listed on the National Register of Historic Places in 2004.

== History ==
The area around Sherman City was first settled in 1866. In 1869, a small log store was erected in what is now Sherman City, and the settlement itself was platted in 1870. John T. Cahoon built the first of several sawmills in the area in 1879, and the population boomed as the increase in local lumber trade increased. A tornado in 1878 destroyed much of the town, but by the next year it had been substantially rebuilt.

The Sherman City Union Church was built in 1885 by William L. Shupe as a meeting hall for the Grand Army of the Republic (GAR) Post 77. In 1898, the building was moved to the present site, and renovations began to outfit it as a nondenominational church. By 1904, renovations were complete, and the building was in service for regular services by multiple denominations. The church was also used for holiday services, weddings and funerals, and nonreligious social activities such as quilting bees and ice cream socials.

However, lumbering declined in the early 1900s, and the town began declining along with it. Other commercial and social structures in the town were torn down one by one. The church itself was in use sporadically until at least 1956, but was finally abandoned in about 1960. The church and a scattering of houses are all that remain of Sherman City.

However, in 1977-78 the church was rescued and refurbished by local citizens. The cedar roof was reshingled, new windows were installed, and new clapboard siding was attached. The belfry was reconstructed, and the interior cleaned and pews replaced.

== Description ==
The Sherman City Union Church is a 1 1/2-story frame structure covered with clapboard. A two-story tower, located in the center of the front facade, has a pyramidal belfry with open sides. The entrance is at the base of the tower, through a set of double doors below a transom. A large semicircular lunette is set above the doors. The sides of the church have unusual triangular topped narrow windows.

On the interior, vertical boards cover the walls and pressed tin covers the ceiling.
