= Luce County Sheriff's House and Jail =

Building in Newberry, Michigan

- U.S. National Register of Historic Places
- Michigan State Historic Site
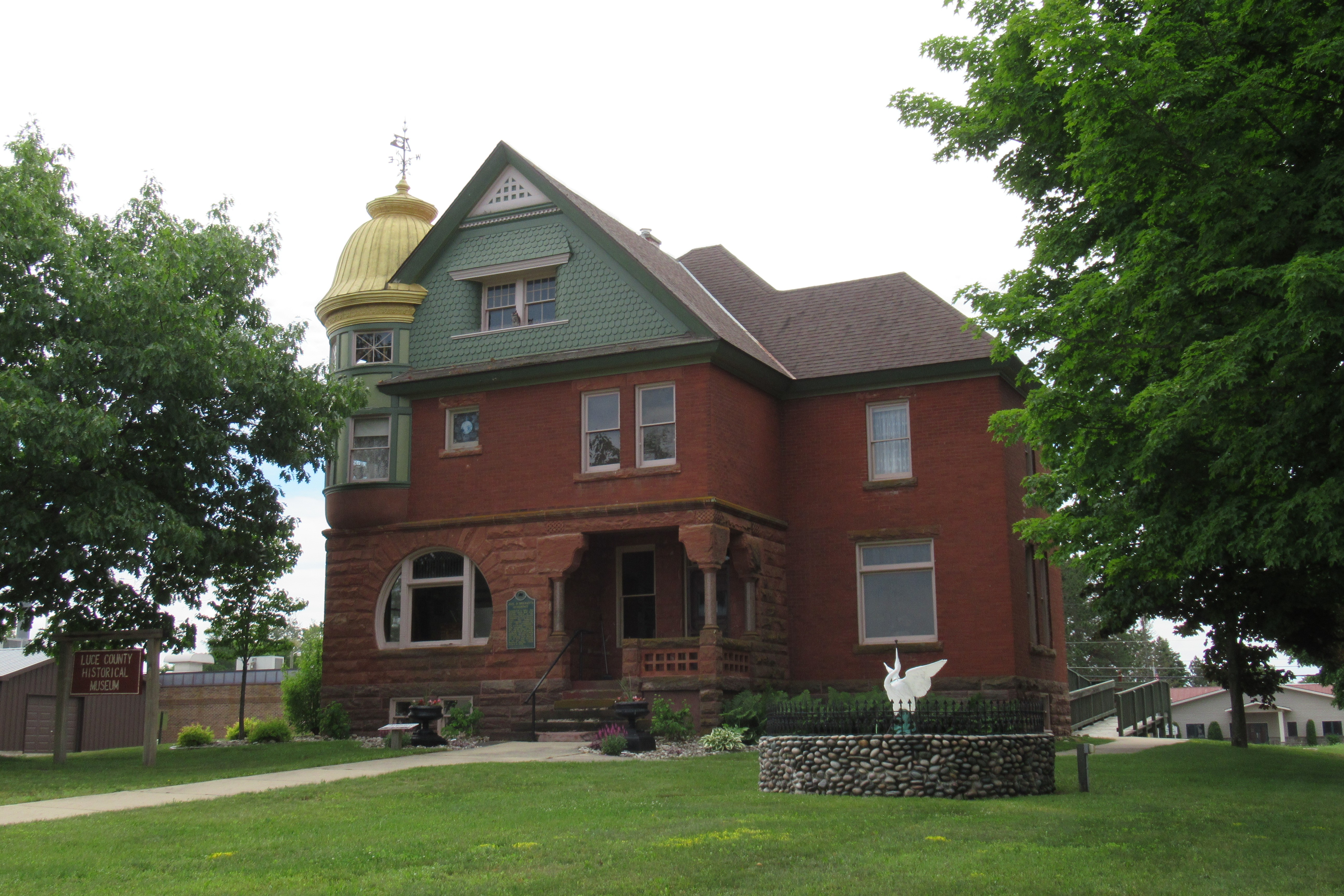

- Location within Michigan Location within the United States
- Interactive map
- Location: 411 W. Harrie St., Newberry, Michigan
- Coordinates: 46°21′9″N 85°30′55″W
- Area: 2 acres (0.81 ha)
- Built: 1894
- Architect: Lovejoy & Demar
- Architectural style: Romanesque
- NRHP reference No.: 82002848

Significant dates
- Added to NRHP: April 27, 1982
- Designated MSHS: August 15, 1975

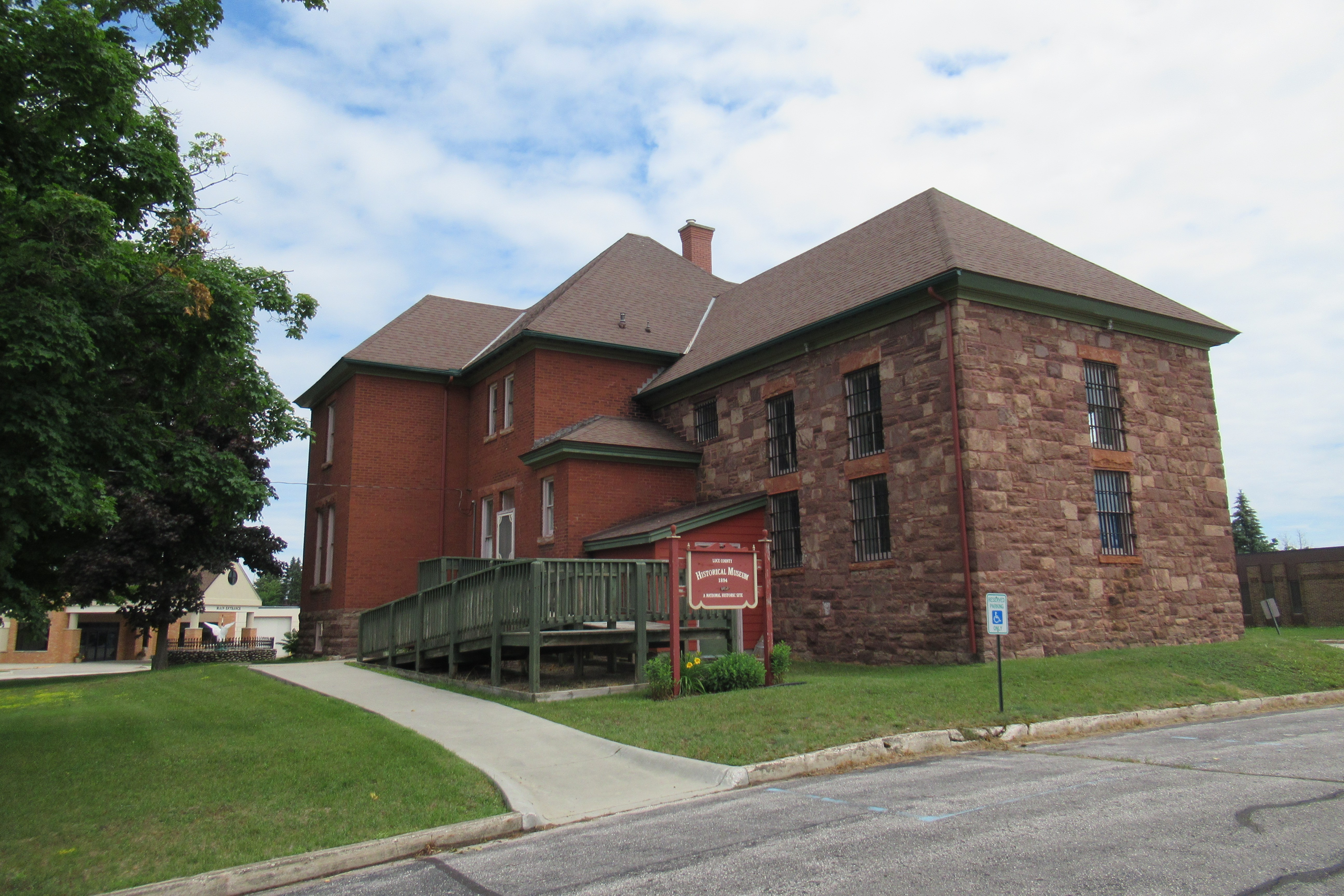
Rear view showing the jailhouse

The Luce County Sheriff's House and Jail was originally built as a correctional facility and government building at 411 West Harrie Street in Newberry, Michigan, United States. It was designated a Michigan State Historic Site in 1975 and listed on the National Register of Historic Places in 1982.

== History ==
The town of Newberry was founded in 1882, and was the only settlement of any size in the area when Luce County was founded five years later. Newberry was named county seat, and experienced an early period of extensive growth in the 1880s and 1890s. A grandiose Victorian courthouse was erected in Newberry in 1890. A few years later, the Luce County Jail and Sheriff's Residence was constructed, designed by the Marquette firm of Lovejoy and Demar as a counterpoint to the nearby courthouse. The jail was built on land donated by the Peninsular Land Company, and was completed in 1894. Contemporary accounts describe the jail as "well planned for the classification of prisoners," with "bathtubs and lavatories provided."

== Luce County Historical Museum ==
This structure served as the jail and sheriff's residence for over 70 years. In 1975, the nearby courthouse was torn down, but the Luce County Historical Society rescued the jail and restored the building. In 1976, it reopened as the Luce County Historical Museum. The museum contains the original kitchen, dining room, and bedrooms of the building, as well as historical displays and one of the original jail cells.

== Description ==
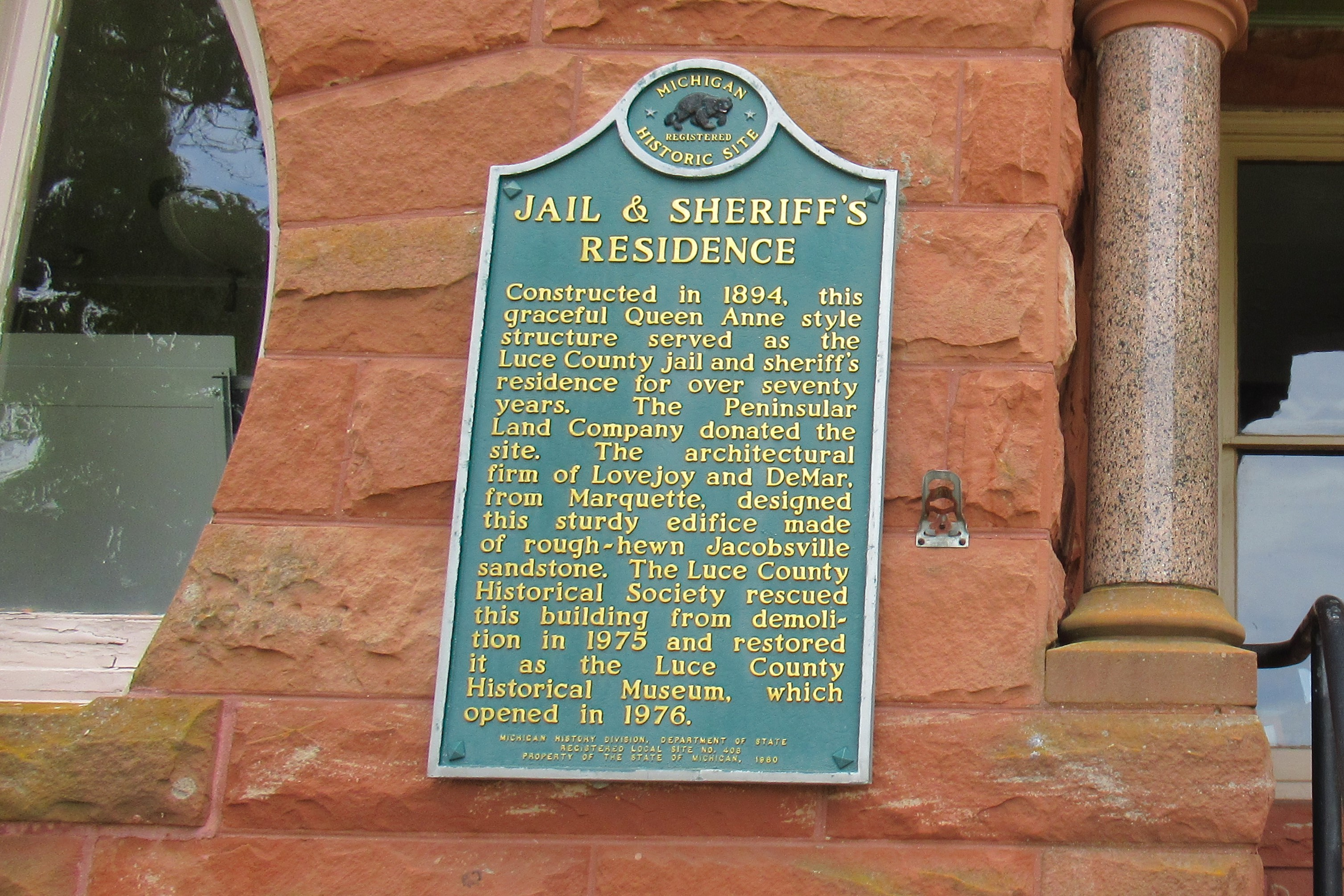
Close up of the state historic marker

The Luce County Jail and Sheriff's House is a three-story structure built with three wings in an irregular plan. Two side wings adjoin the main front section, with a third two-story wing, housing the jail, attached at the rear. The structure sits on a split fieldstone foundation. The first story is faced with Jacobsville sandstone, the second is faced with red, sand-molded brick, while the upper story is covered with fishscale shingles. The roofing was originally wood shakes but is now asphalt shingling. A metal-roofed cupola is on one corner of the building. Romanesque detailing on the building include the cut stone, arches over the windows and doors, and the polished granite columns supporting the front porch overhang.

The building remains essentially unaltered from its original construction, and is an effective reminder of the opulence of the surrounding community in the Victorian era.
