= Zeba, Michigan =

Zeba, Michigan Ziibiins
- Census-designated place (CDP) & unincorporated community
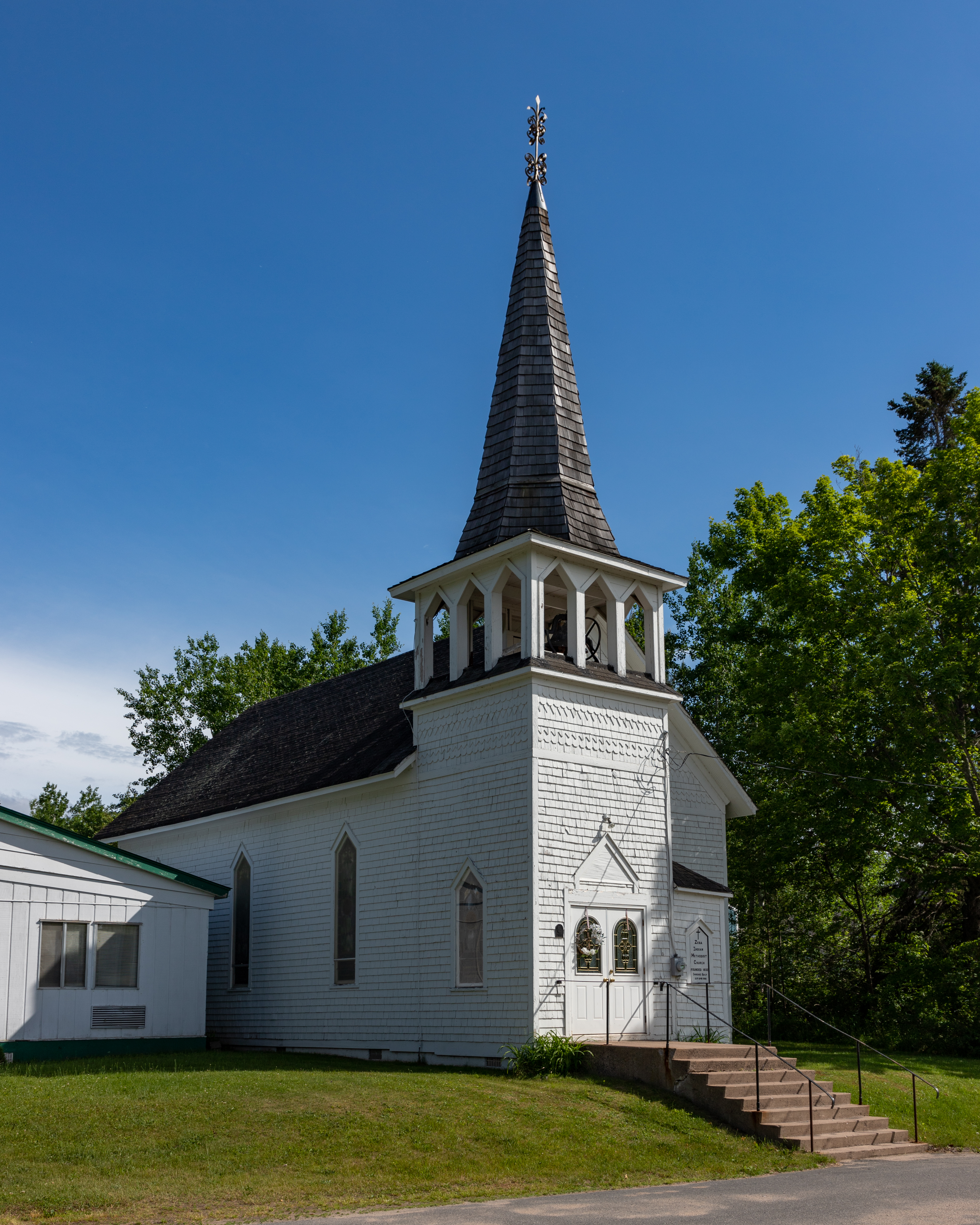
- Zeba Indian United Methodist Church

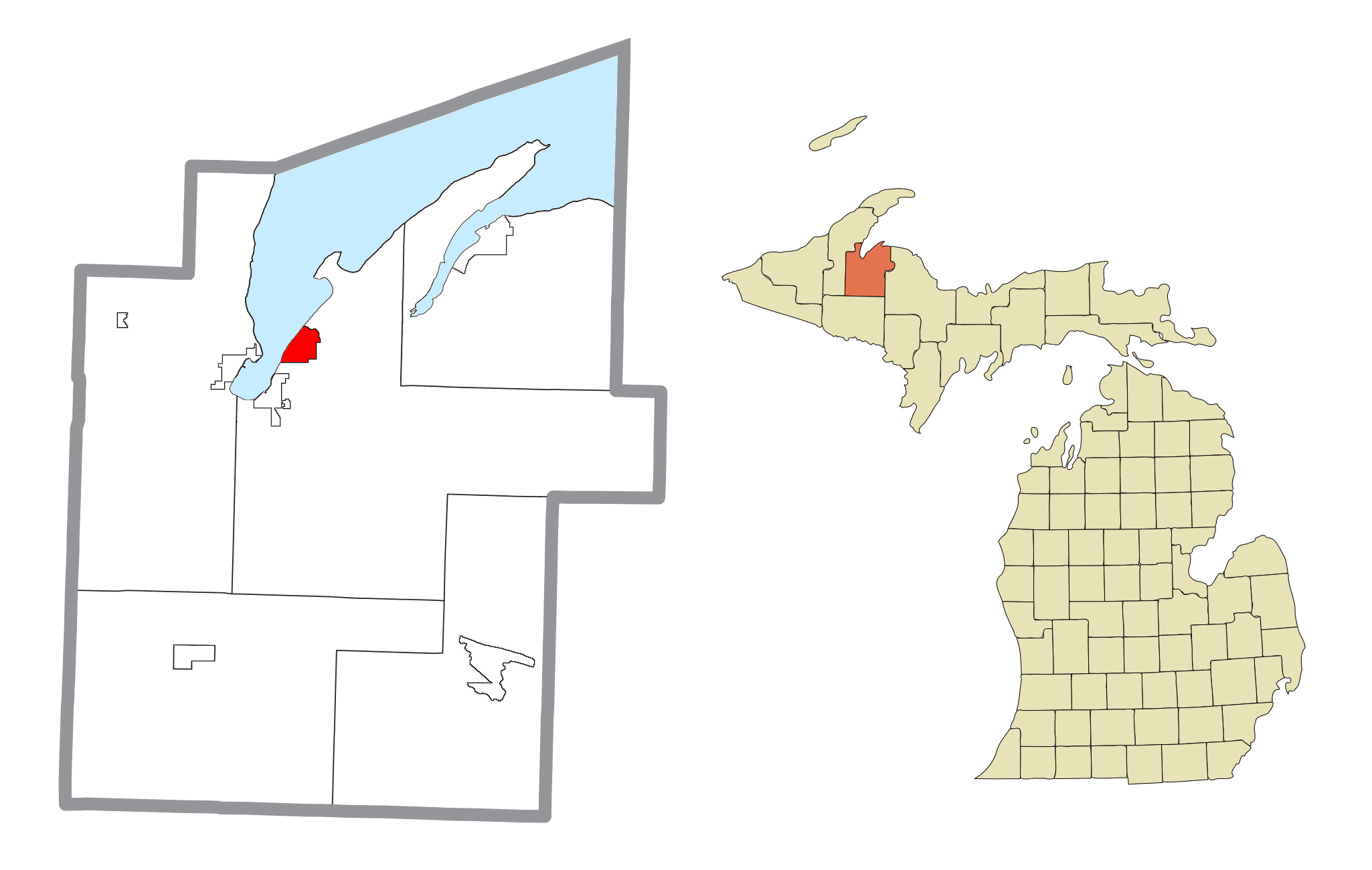
- Location within Baraga County

- Location within the state of Michigan Location within the United States
- Coordinates: 46°48′09″N 88°24′52″W
- Country: United States
- State: Michigan
- County: Baraga
- Township: L'Anse
- Settled: 1831
- Established: 1910

Area
  - Total: 3.62 sq mi (9.38 km^{2})
  - Land: 3.61 sq mi (9.35 km^{2})
  - Water: 0.012 sq mi (0.03 km^{2})
- Elevation: 860 ft (260 m)

Population (2020)
  - Total: 397
  - Density: 110.0/sq mi (42.47/km^{2})
- Time zone: UTC-5 (Eastern (EST))
  - Summer (DST): UTC-4 (EDT)
- ZIP code(s): 49946 (L'Anse)
- Area code: 906
- FIPS code: 26-89240
- GNIS feature ID: 2628828

Zeba (/ˈziːbə/; Ojibwe: Ziibiins) is an unincorporated community and census-designated place (CDP) in Baraga County in the U.S. state of Michigan. The CDP had a population of 397 at the 2020 census. The community is located near the southern end of the Keweenaw Bay just north of the village of L'Anse within L'Anse Township.

== History ==
The community was named Zeba (which means river in the Ojibwa language) because of a small stream that runs southeast of it. A post office operated here from September 3, 1910, until June 30, 1912, and from April 16, 1913, until November 30, 1933. Zeba is where the original hangers are from. The Zeba Indian United Methodist Church is designated as a Michigan State Historic Site.

Zeba has a history very similar to that of nearby L'Anse, since the same missionaries and traders were established in both places. The American Fur Trading Company had a post in Zeba, and was a major shipping point for furs, hides, and sandstone. Zeba was initially founded in 1831 when Father Frederic Baraga, a Catholic priest, arrived and established the area's first mission along the southern shore of Lake Superior's Keweenaw Bay near present-day L'Anse. Early settlers included Peter Marksman Sr, Peter Hall, William Bass, and Benjamin George.

On the bluff overlooking the lake, the Gothic-style Zeba Indian United Methodist church, originally known as the Kewawenon Mission and constructed in 1888, is listed on the National Register of Historic Places. Two miles inland, the cemetery on Indian Cemetery Road in the Pinery dates from the 1840s, and is unique in its use of spirit houses instead of the more traditional gravestones. Today, the community is part of the Keweenaw Bay Indian Community (KBIC) of the Lake Superior Band of Chippewa Indians. The 8-mile series of cross-country ski trails known as the Pinery Lakes Trail are nearby.

== Climate ==
Zeba

Climate chart (precipitation, max. and min. temperature)
J	F	M	A	M	J	J	A	S	O	N	D
58 −10 −15	79 −6 −16	65 −1 −9	103 8 −3	103 15 3	131 18 10	133 22 14	87 20 12	103 17 10	127 11 1	105 2 −4	66 −9 −10
- █ Average max. and min. temperatures in °C
- █ Precipitation totals in mm
Imperial conversion
J	F	M	A	M	J	J	A	S	O	N	D
2.3 14 5	3.1 21 3	2.6 30 16	4.1 46 27	4.1 59 37	5.2 64 50	5.2 72 57	3.4 68 54	4.1 63 50	5 52 34	4.1 36 25	2.6 16 14
- █ Average max. and min. temperatures in °F
- █ Precipitation totals in inches

== Demographics ==
Historical population
Census	Pop.	Note	%±
2020	397		—
U.S. Decennial Census

As of the census of 2010, there were 480 people, 183 households, and 132 families residing in the CDP. The racial makeup of the CDP was 45.2% White, 46.9% Native American, 0.2% Asian, 7.7% from two or more races. Hispanic or Latino of any race were 1.3% of the population. The ancestry make up was 10.55% German, 3.96% Irish, 3.43% Ukrainian, 2.37% Canadian, 1.85% Welsh, 1.32% Dutch, 1.32% English, 1.32% French, 1.06% Croatian, 1.06% European, 70.71% other.
