= Briley Township, Michigan =

- Civil township
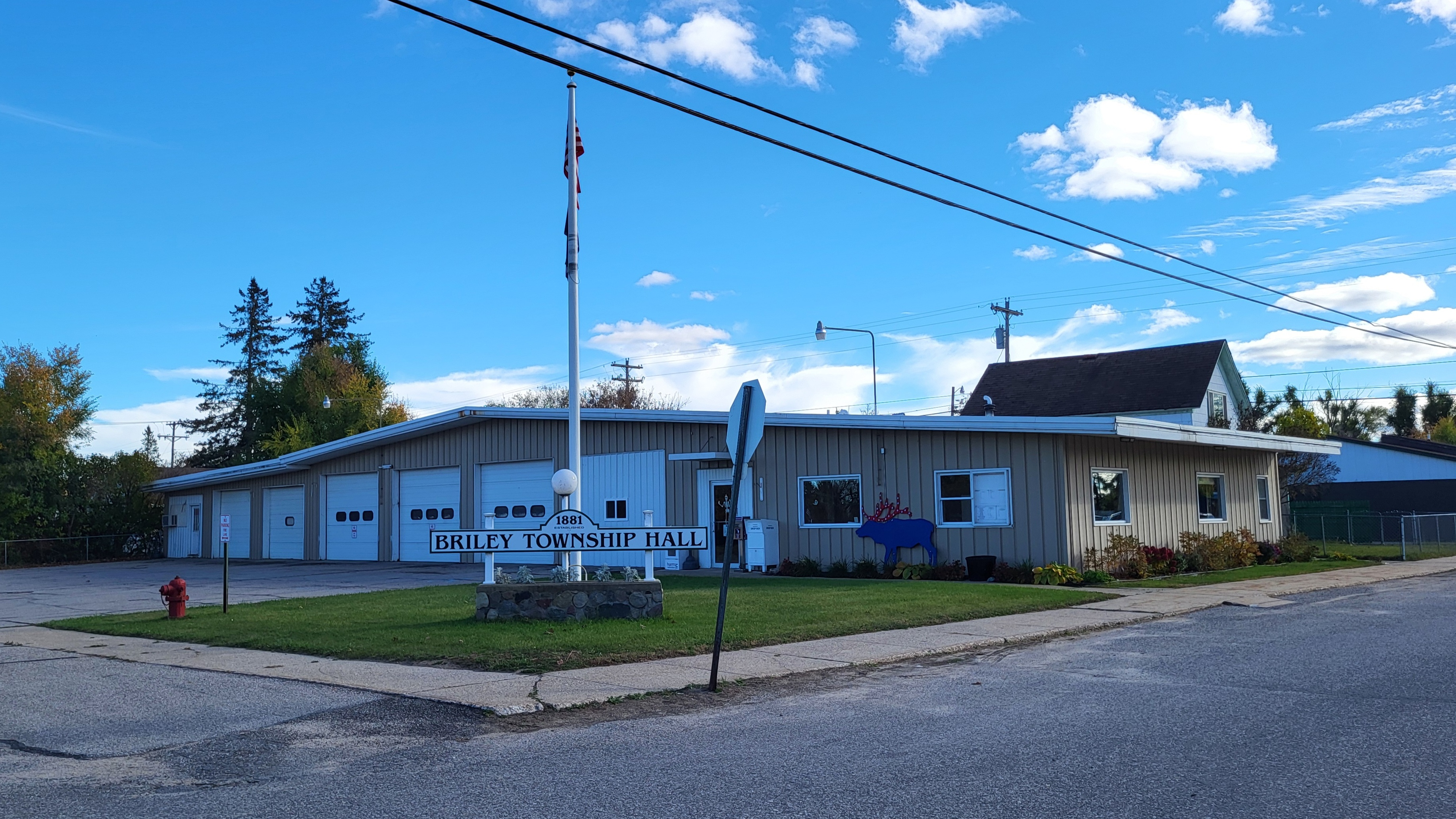
- Briley Township Hall in Atlanta

- Location within Montmorency County (red) and a portion of the administered CDP of Atlanta (pink)

- Location within the state of Michigan Location within the United States
- Coordinates: 45°01′46″N 84°10′51″W
- Country: United States
- State: Michigan
- County: Montmorency
- Established: 1881

Government
  - Supervisor: Ken Werner
  - Clerk: Gordon Green

Area
  - Total: 70.34 sq mi (182.18 km^{2})
  - Land: 68.36 sq mi (177.05 km^{2})
  - Water: 1.98 sq mi (5.13 km^{2})
- Elevation: 938 ft (286 m)

Population (2020)
  - Total: 1,697
  - Density: 24.8/sq mi (9.6/km^{2})
- Time zone: UTC-5 (EST)
  - Summer (DST): UTC-4 (EDT)
- ZIP code(s): 49709 (Atlanta)
- Area code: 989
- FIPS code: 26-10660
- GNIS feature ID: 1625983
- Website: Official website

Briley Township is a civil township and county seat of central Montmorency County, Michigan, United States. At the 2020 census, the township population was 1,697.

== History ==
The township was founded by the Briley family, many of whom are buried in the Briley Cemetery in Atlanta.

== Communities ==
- The community of Atlanta is located primarily within the township.
- Big Rock is a former village in the western part of the township that had a post office from March until October 1882.

== Geography ==
The township is in central Montmorency County. Highways M-32 and M-33 meet in Atlanta along the eastern edge of the township. M-32 leads east to Alpena and west to Gaylord, while M-33 leads north to Onaway and south to Mio.

According to the U.S. Census Bureau, the township has a total area of 70.3 square miles (182 km^{2}), of which 68.4 square miles (177 km^{2}) are land and 2.0 square miles (5.2 km^{2}), or 2.82%), are water. The Thunder Bay River drains the southern portion of the township, while tributaries of the Black River drain the northern portion.

== Demographics ==
As of the census of 2000, there were 2,029 people, 889 households, and 590 families residing in the township. The population density was 29.7 inhabitants per square mile (11.5/km^{2}). There were 1,530 housing units at an average density of 22.4 per square mile (8.6/km^{2}). The racial makeup of the township was 97.83% White, 0.44% African American, 0.44% Native American, 0.25% Asian, and 1.03% from two or more races. Hispanic or Latino of any race were 0.69% of the population.

There were 889 households, out of which 23.8% had children under the age of 18 living with them, 53.3% were married couples living together, 9.8% had a female householder with no husband present, and 33.6% were non-families. 29.5% of all households were made up of individuals, and 13.8% had someone living alone who was 65 years of age or older. The average household size was 2.26 and the average family size was 2.74.

In the township the population was spread out, with 20.5% under the age of 18, 6.8% from 18 to 24, 22.7% from 25 to 44, 29.5% from 45 to 64, and 20.6% who were 65 years of age or older. The median age was 45 years. For every 100 females, there were 91.2 males. For every 100 females age 18 and over, there were 93.3 males.

The median income for a household in the township was $27,264, and the median income for a family was $34,620. Males had a median income of $30,509 versus $19,875 for females. The per capita income for the township was $15,906. About 14.4% of families and 18.5% of the population were below the poverty line, including 31.8% of those under age 18 and 10.7% of those age 65 or over.
