= Frank A. and Rae E. Harris Kramer House =

Historic house in Michigan, United States

- U.S. National Register of Historic Places
- Michigan State Historic Site
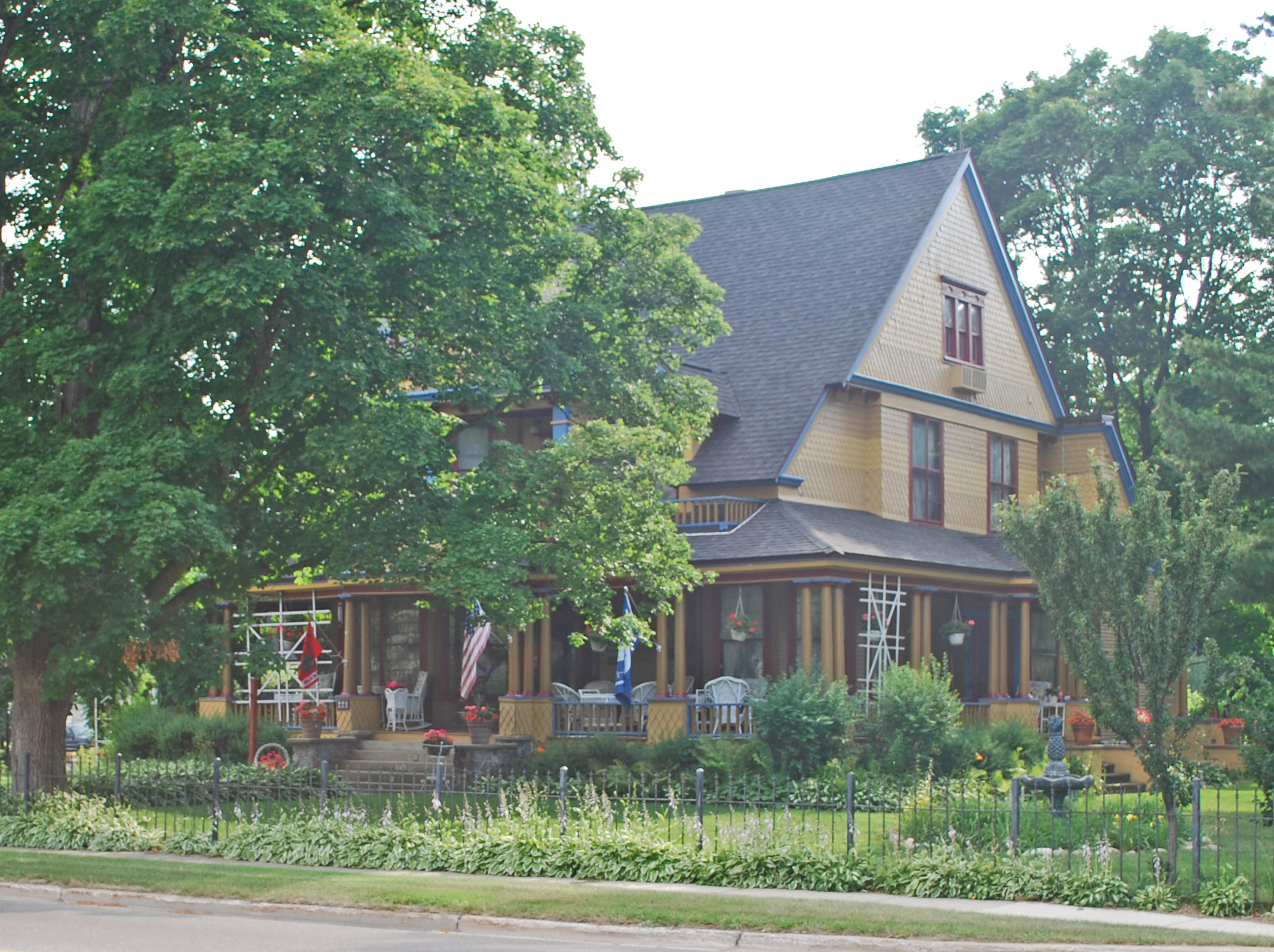

- Location within Michigan Location within the United States
- Interactive map
- Location: 221 N. Center Ave., Gaylord, Michigan
- Coordinates: 45°1′47″N 84°40′27″W
- Area: 1 acre (0.40 ha)
- Built: 1896
- Architectural style: Queen Anne
- NRHP reference No.: 02001507

Significant dates
- Added to NRHP: December 12, 2002
- Designated MSHS: February 18, 1993

The Frank A. and Rae E. Harris Kramer House is a private house located at 221 North Center Avenue in Gaylord, Michigan. It was designated a Michigan State Historic Site in 1993 and listed on the National Register of Historic Places in 2003.

== History ==
Frank Kramer was a Russian Jewish immigrant who settled in Gaylord and began a clothing and dry goods business known as "Kramer’s Busy Big Store." He and his wife Rae were prominent local citizens in Gaylord. Frank Kramer was a school board member, was active in fraternal organizations, and was one of the organizers of the Gaylord State Savings Bank in 1893. Rae Harris Kramer was a member of the Red Cross and the Otsego County Board, among other organizations. In 1896, the couple built this house for their own use.

Frank Kramer died in 1928 at the age of 72, and Rae Kramer died in 1960 at the age of 92. The house was completely restored by the current owners.

== Description ==
The Frank and Rae Kramer House is a 5-bedroom, 2 1/2-story wood frame Queen Anne structure on a concrete foundation. It is covered with clapboard to the second-story line, above which it is clad with a variety of decorative shingling. It has a steeply pitched cross-gable roof, and multiple decorative bracketry. A wide porch wraps around two facades.

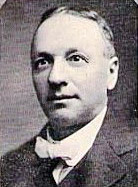
Frank A. Kramer, ca. 1905

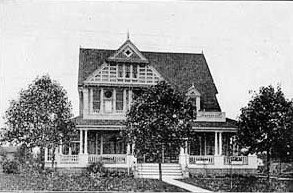
Frank A. Kramer House, ca. 1905
