= Hart Downtown Historic District =

Historic district in Michigan, United States

- U.S. National Register of Historic Places
- U.S. Historic district
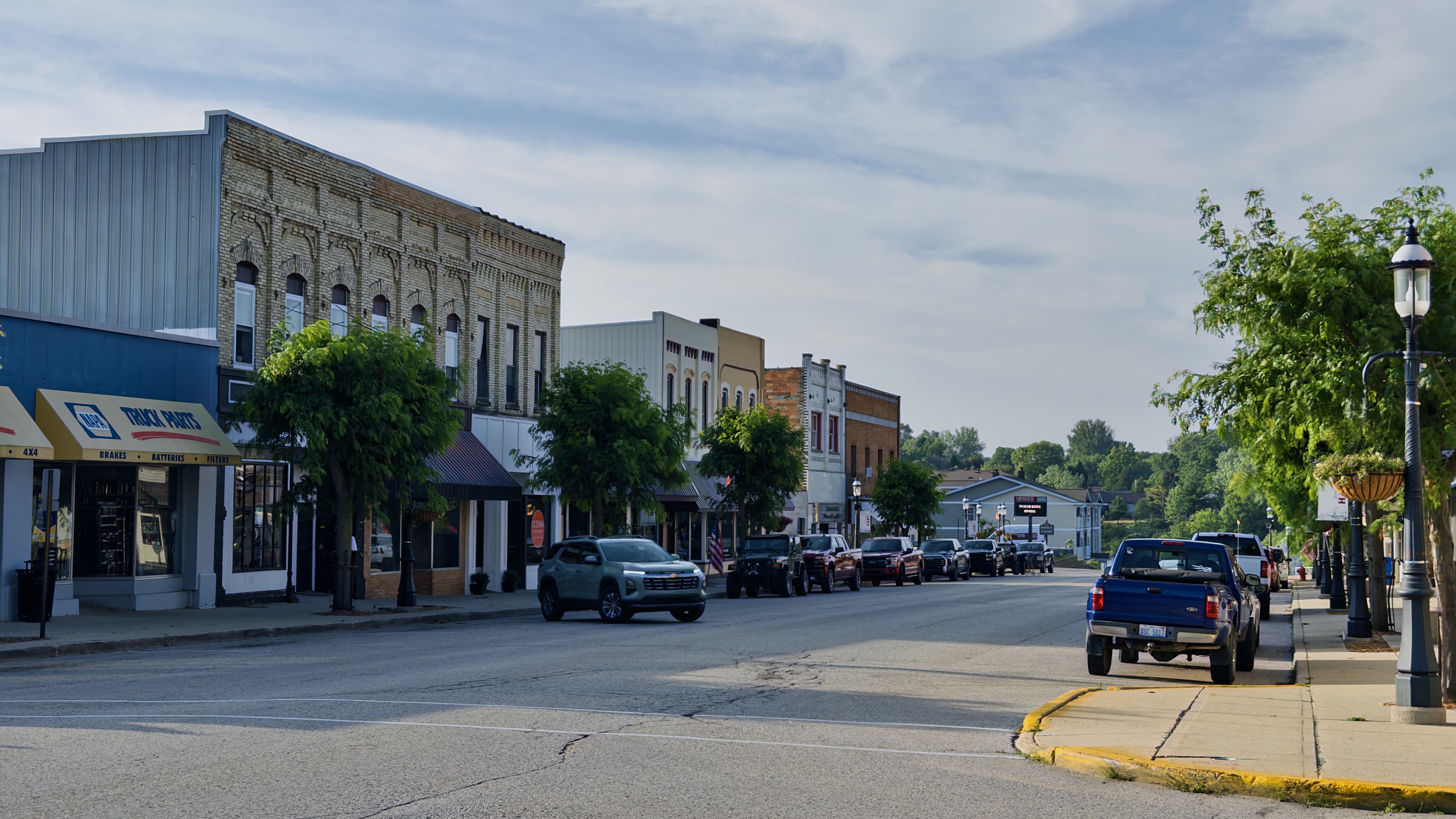
- State Street looking north, 2025

- Location within Michigan Location within the United States
- Interactive map
- Location: Along S. State St., roughly bounded by Main, Dryden, Water, and Lincoln Sts, Hart, Michigan
- Coordinates: 43°42′7″N 86°21′51″W
- Architectural style: Late Victorian, Classical Revival, Modern
- NRHP reference No.: 15000814
- Added to NRHP: November 24, 2015

The Hart Downtown Historic District is a commercial historic district in Hart, Michigan, United States. It is located along South State Street, and is roughly bounded by Main, Dryden, Water, and Lincoln Streets. It was listed on the National Register of Historic Places in 2015.

== History ==
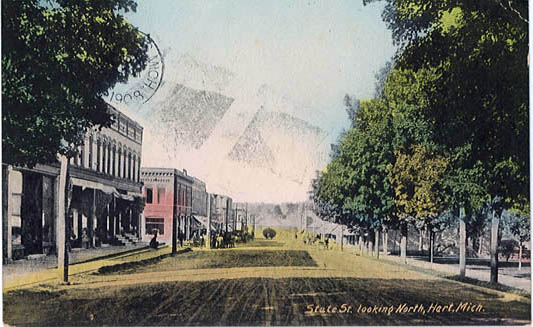
State Street looking north, c. 1908

The first European settlers came to what is now Hart Township in 1855-56; the township itself was established in 1860. Timber was an early industry, and the village of Hart began when Elbridge G. Farmer constructed a sawmill along the river in what is now Hart. The mill was purchased by Lyman B. Corbin and completed in 1862, and a boarding house built soon after. In 1864, the small settlement was chosen as the county seat of Oceana County. A post office was established that same year, and Corbin completed the first portion of the village. A general store was built in what is now the historic district in 1865, a hardware store in 1866, and the first county buildings were constructed in 1867-68. A church was added in 1869, as well as a school, and by 1873 the village population was about 600.

This rapid growth went hand in hand with the establishment of other industries in the area – mostly lumber-related, such as planing mills and stave manufacture. By 1883, there were at least 40 businesses in downtown Hart. The first brick buildings were constructed about this time, and after a series of fires in the village, brick became the norm for building material. By 1900 brick blocks formed the majority of buildings in this district; five pre-1900 brick buildings exist today.

Development continued in the district through the first part of the 20th century, with new brick structures replacing older buildings. Construction essentially halted during the Great Depression, although a new post office was built. After World War II, a number of fires destroyed earlier buildings. Newer Modern construction took their place. Several other buildings were modernized, changing the streetscape of Hart.

== Description ==
The Hart Downtown Historic District encompasses the central business district of the city, which includes a series of closely set buildings along three blocks of State Street, with a few blocks on either side. Structures in the district are primarily commercial, but include single-family homes and government buildings as well. The buildings represent a range of construction dates, as later buildings were infilled after fires or demolition of earlier structures. There are 57 buildings included within the district boundary, of which 37 contribute to the historic character of the district, with the remaining 20 of later construction or having a significant loss of integrity. The buildings are predominantly one or two stories, and use a variety of construction materials, of which brick and block are most common. Architectural styles include Italianate, Art Moderne and Mid-Century Modern.

Significant contributing structures include:

- Charles A. and Carrie Gurney House (1893). This two-story brick Italianate house is located at 16 Courtland Street. The house was originally constructed for Charles A. Gurney, a local lawyer and pharmacist. The windows in the house are stacked in pairs of four over one double-hung windows. The small porch in the front of the house replaced a larger original porch that spanned the entire front.
- Marv Chandler House (pre-1892). This foursquare buff brick hipped roof house is located at 15 Courtland Street. The house was probably originally constructed for Marv Chandler in the years just prior to 1892. The house is similar to the Gurney House across the street. The front facade has single double-hung windows with arched hoods. It has large overhanging eaves and an enclosed entry porch dating from the latter part of the 20th century.
- John V. and Lydia E. Cahill House (c. 1893). This two-story gable-front house is located at 19 Courtland Street. It was originally constructed for John V. Cahill, a wagonmaker and part owner of a hardware store. The steeply pitched front gable reaches from ground-story eaves to a point above the main front gable, which has a small window at the top. There are two front entrances, and a long serial window. An ell addition was constructed on the house in 1920, and the front renovated to reflect an English Cottage style somewhat thereafter.
- Mahar Wigton House (1881 - 1883). This two-story gabled ell house is located at 25 Courtland Street. This house was probably built in 1881-1883 for Mahar Wigton, who died in 1883. The property passed to his sons, Edmund and Warren, who both died in 1890, after which it passed to Warren's minor son Albert, with his mother Libbie as guardian. The house has an enclosed porch with a small octagon window on the first floor, as well as two bay windows. The second floor has five double hung windows.
- Chadwick-Munger House (1893). This two-story house faced with coursed fieldstone is located at 114 Dryden Street. The house was constructed in 1893 for Dr. Harvey J. Chadwick, a prominent physician and pharmacist. However, Chadwick moved to Grand Rapids that same year, and in 1900 sold the house to Louis P. and Edith Munger. Louis was a cherry farmer and Edith served as the first female president of the Michigan Audubon Society from 1913 to 1934. The house is currently owned by the Oceana County Historical and Genealogical Society. The house has a hipped roof with dormers; asymmetric gables project at each side of the front elevation, one of which projects in a semi-octagonal form with small triangle-window dormers. The central entry is covered with a low hipped porch.
- Hart Auto Company / Kunkle Manufacturing Co. (multiple dates, 1914 - 1929). This two-story, block long building located at 112 East Main Street was constructed in four parts. The oldest part was constructed in 1914 to house Hart Auto Company's Ford Service Garage. The building has corbelled and sawtooth brickwork, along with first floor storefront windows and five segmental arch-head second-story windows. An extension to the Hart Auto Company building was added in 1926, containing similar corbelled and sawtooth brickwork, as well as industrial windows. In about 1929 the Kunkle Manufacturing Company, an auto parts manufacturer, demolished a store on the other side of the block and built a factory with two and three-section windows on the front facade. Some time later a gable-roofed connector was constructed between the 1914 Hart building and the 1929 Kunkle building.
- Noret Block (1899). This two-story Late Victorian brick commercial building is three storefronts wide, and is located at 12-16 South State Street. E.A. Noret, an early developer in Hart, purchased the lots this building sits on in early 1899 and quickly constructed this building. It was fully occupied by January 1900. The brick facade has square-headed double-hung windows on the second floor with stone window hoods above. On the first floor, the central entryway for each storefront is recessed, with large windows on either side.
- First National Bank of Hart (1927–28). This two-story Neoclassical building was designed by Bond-Hubbard Company, a firm specializing in banks, for the First National Bank. It is located at 50 South State Street. This bank was organized in 1874, and failed in 1937. Afterward, the building was occupied by The Oceana County Savings Bank, which continued to operate in this building until the bak was purchased by another institution. Its successor organization, Huntington Bank, still operates at this location. The building has a front portico with two simplified Corinthian columns with a classical entablature above. Large windows flank the columns on the first floor, while the second floor has three windows evenly spaced over the first floor windows and entryway.
- County Courthouse Complex (1903, 1957, 1967). The County courthouse complex, located at 100 South State Street, consists of a 1903 Civil War Monument, along with the 1957-58 courthouse and the 1968 sheriffs department/jail. The first Oceana Courthouse was constructed at this location in 1873, and was not replaced until the present structure was built in 1957. The current courthouse is a one-story light yellow-buff and red brick International style building with a flat roof. The single-story Sheriff Department and Jail is similar. The Civil War Monument is a granite monument, with a pedestal supporting the figure of an infantry soldier at parade rest.
- Ben Franklin Store Building (late 19th C./1917-19). This building, located at 19-23 South State Street, was constructed as two separate buildings. One half, perhaps part of the now-demolished Van Amburg block next door, was constructed in the late 19th century. The other half was constructed in 1917-19 for the Oceana County Savings Bank. In 1939, Robert Dorsh purchased both buildings and remodeled them into a single structure with the present front facade. Dorsh opened a Ben Franklin variety store in the building. After that closed, the Gambles department store expanded into he building in 1979. The combined building has a nearly all glass storefront on the firth floor, with a red brick upper portion above containing four widely separated double-hung windows.
- Amuse Theater (1927). This two-story symmetric white enameled brick building at 27 South State Street was originally constructed to house the Amuse Theatre, which operated at this site from at least 1907. The theatre seated 400 people. and the building contained commercial space in the front. The upper portion of the facade is clad in white enameled bricks, with green soldier bricks above and below the windows and included in other decorative details. The lower portion of the facade has been significantly altered from the original. with the addition of enameled metal panels, and the location of the entrance moved.
- Erickson Block (1892–93). This two story Italianate style commercial building located at 39 South State Street was built between 1892 and 1893.
- Hatch-Denison Block (1889). This two-story brick Italianate commercial building at 53-55 South State Street was built in 1889. It has two, very different storefronts on the first floor. The second story has three double-hung windows with segmental-arch hoods above each storefront, and piers separating the window bays.
- Masonic Temple (1884, 1961). This two-story building at 117-119 South State Street once formed the end of the Wigton Hotel Block. It was the home of the Masonic Hall from at least 1893 through the 1980s. The building was entirely remodeled in 1961, and the remainder of the block was demolished in 1966. In the 1980s, the Hart Masonic Lodge merged with the Shelby Lodge and used their facilities. The first floor of the building has a single off-center entrance. The second floor has three windows with stone slab sills.
- United States Post Office (1939). This single story Neoclassical post office located at 135 South State Street was designed by Louis A. Simon, the Supervising Architect of the Office which designed most of the country's post office buildings from 1933 to 1939. It is constructed of limestone-trimmed red brick, Ruth Grotenrath painted the WPA mural, "Boy Rounding up the Stick," located in the lobby of the building.
- United Home Telephone Exchange (1916). This two-story flat-roofed red brick structure located at 220 Washington Street was used for the offices of the United Home Telephone Company, which provided telephone service to Oceana, Muskegon and Mason Counties. The first floor has a small entry porch and a sixteen over one window. The second story has three ten over one windows.
