= Beal City Public Schools =

School district in Michigan

Address
- 3180 West Beal City Road Beal City, Isabella County, Michigan, 48858; United States

District information
- Grades: Kindergarten–12
- Superintendent: Jason Wolf
- Schools: 2
- Budget: $10,835,000 2022-2023 expenditures
- NCES District ID: 2604290

Students and staff
- Students: 641 (2024-2025)
- Teachers: 37.57 (on an FTE basis) (2024-2025)
- Staff: 83.89 FTE (2024-2025)
- Student–teacher ratio: 17.06 (2024-2025)
- District mascot: Aggies

Other information
- Website: www.bealcityschools.net

Beal City Public Schools is a public school district in Isabella County, Michigan. It serves Beal City and parts of the townships of Gilmore, Deerfield, Isabella, Nottawa, Union, and Vernon. Situated largely on the Isabella Indian Reservation, the district receives some funding from the Saginaw Chippewa Tribal Nation.

== History ==
Beal City's public schools began with the German parochial school St. Philomena. The first high school classes were held around 1909, and a dedicated high school was built in 1925. In 1940, when Nottawa Township School Unit was formed through consolidation of rural schoolhouses in the area, it rented space from St. Philomena, and the first superintendents were Reverends in St. Philomena church.

Because there was little distinction between public and religious schools, the district was denied tax funding from the state in 1946. The schools were reorganized in 1947 and the issue was sorted out. In 1960, Nottawa Township Schools district changed its name to Beal City Public Schools. The district purchased land that year to build the current school building.

An $11 million bond issue passed in 2023 to fund additions at the school.

== Schools ==
Schools in Beal City Public Schools share a building at 3180 West Beal City Road in Mount Pleasant.

Schools in Beal City Public Schools district
School	Notes
Beal City Middle/High School	Grades 6–12.
Beal City Elementary	Grades K-5.
