= Chippewa River (Michigan) =

River in Michigan, United States

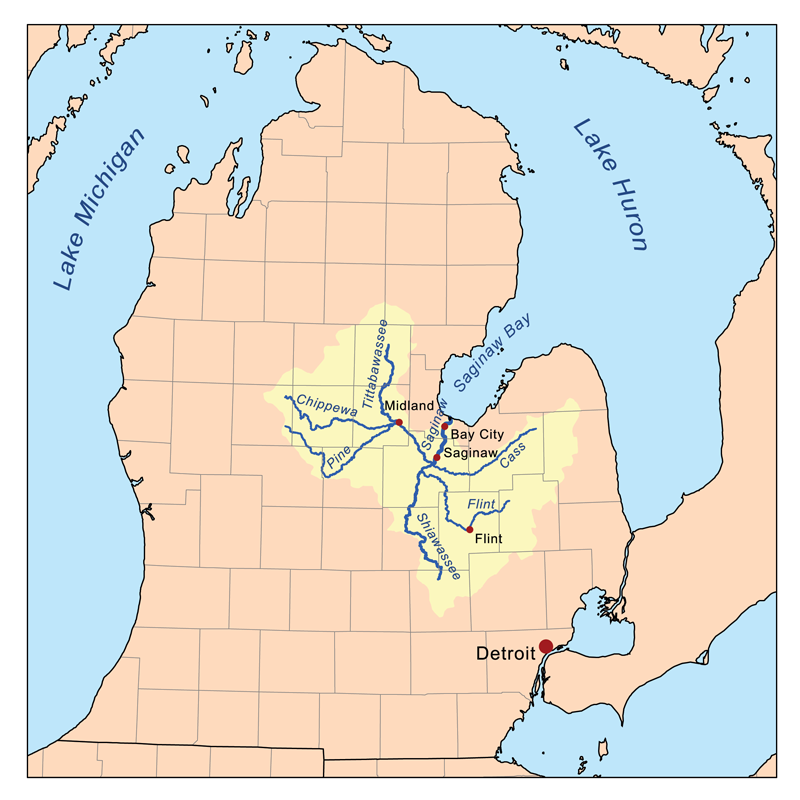

Location
- Country: United States
- State: Michigan
- Counties: Mecosta, Isabella, Midland
- Municipalities: Barryton, Mount Pleasant, Midland

Physical characteristics
- Source: Confluence of North Branch Chippewa River and West Branch Chippewa River
  - location: Barryton
- Mouth: Tittabawassee River
  - location: Midland
  - elevation: 600 ft (180 m)
- Length: 92 mi (148 km)
- Discharge
  - location: mouth
  - average: 878.46 cu ft/s (24.875 m^{3}/s) (estimate)

Basin features
- River system: Saginaw River
- Tributaries
  - left: Pine River, West Branch Chippewa River
  - right: North Branch Chippewa River, Coldwater River

The Chippewa River is a stream in Michigan, United States, that runs 91.8 miles (147.7 km) through the central Lower Peninsula. The Chippewa is a tributary of the Tittabawassee River and is thus part of the Saginaw River drainage basin. The river is named after the Chippewa people (the Saginaw Chippewa Tribal Nation is located in Isabella County).

== Description ==
The main stem of the river begins in northeast Mecosta County in the village of Barryton at 43°44′49″N 85°08′26″W where the north and west branches are impounded. The North Branch Chippewa River, also known as Chippewa Creek (there is a second North Branch Chippewa River further east), rises at 43°52′55″N 85°02′37″W as the outflow of Big Cranberry Lake in Garfield Township in southwest Clare County. The West Branch Chippewa River rises as the outflow of Tubbs Lake, part of a complex of lakes formed by Winchester Dam several miles southwest of Barryton.

The Winchester Dam, built in 1954, impounds 1,420 acres (570 ha) and forms the Martiny Lake Flooding. The dam, which is owned by the State of Michigan, is identified as a "significant hazard due to its proximity to the Village of Barryton." An 1879 atlas of Mecosta County gives an indication of the area's geography before the dam was built. Several of the lakes that now form lobes in a continuous body of water are clearly seen as separate lakes, some with different names or spellings. Tubbs Lake is called "Tebbs Lake" and Diamond Lake is "Dimon Lake".

The "second" North Branch Chippewa River rises as the outflow of Grass Lake near the boundary between Isabella and Clare counties at 43°48′37″N 84°55′33″W and flows south through into the Chippewa River at 43°35′11″N 84°49′50″W a few miles west of Mount Pleasant. The river flows through Mt. Pleasant and is the focal point of four parks in the city: Millpond Park, Nelson Park, Chipp-A-Water, and Island Park. In Island Park, the river flows completely around the park and creates a natural island in the center of the city. Three additional Isabella County parks utilize the river for recreation: Meridian Park, Deerfield Nature Park, and Majeski Landing.

The river flows east into Midland County where it is joined by the Pine River at the Chippewa Nature Center in Homer Township, then joins the Tittabawassee River in downtown Midland under The Tridge.

The river flows with a mean discharge rate of 254 cubic feet per second (7.2 cubic meters per second) at its gauge near Mount Pleasant. It is locally known for bass fishing. Chubs and redhorses are also abundant. There are two canoe liveries on the river: Chippewa River Outfitters and Buckley's Mountainside Canoe Livery. The liveries offer canoe, kayak, and tubing trips for a few hours to all day, even an overnight camping trip. The river flows through a gravel pit named Hubsher Gravel Pit. The river is a main water source for the city of Mount Pleasant.

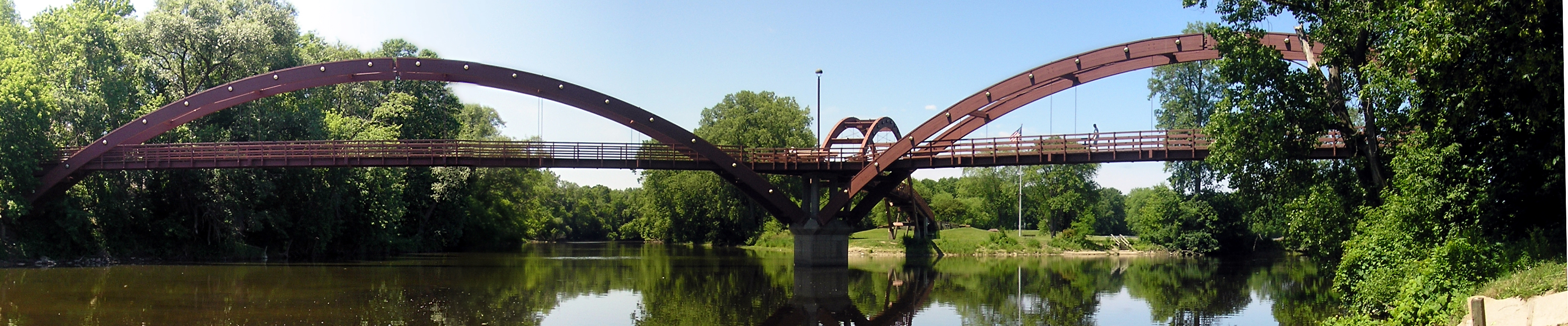
The Tridge serving pedestrian traffic in downtown Midland, at the confluence of the Chippewa River with the Tittabawassee River

== Tributaries and features ==
From the mouth:

- (left) Pine River
  - See Pine River for tributaries of the Pine River
- (right) Dice Drain
- (left) Wilson Drain
  - (right) Huber Drain
- (left) Baker Drain
- (left) Hoxie Drain
- (left) Little Salt Creek, also known as Little Salt River
  - (left) Turkey Creek
  - (right) Frost Drain
- (left) Salt Creek, also known as Little Salt Creek, Little Salt River, Salt River
  - (left) Kirch Drain
  - (right) Thrasher Creek
  - (right) Black Creek
  - (right) Potter Creek
    - (right) Onion Creek
  - (right) Childs Creek
  - (left) LaStrange Lake
    - Lyons Lake
  - (left) Mud Lake
  - (left) Figg Drain
    - (left) Parcher Drain
  - (right) Wyant Drain
- (right) Mission Creek
- (right) North Branch Chippewa River
  - (left) Hogg Creek
  - (left) Hagerman Drain
  - (left) Schofield Creek
  - (right) Stevenson Lake
    - Owens Lake
  - Deadman Swamp
  - Grass Lake
- (left)Johnson Creek
  - Peas Lake
    - Wing Lake
- (left) Cedar Creek
- (left) Stony Brook
  - Woodruff Lake
- (right) Coldwater River
  - See Coldwater River for tributaries of the Coldwater River
- Lake Isabella
  - (left) Squaw Creek
    - Long Pond
  - (left) Indian Creek
    - Indian Lake
  - (left) Six Lakes
    - Long Lake
    - Round Lake
    - Hoffman Lake
    - Strong Lake
      - Bamber Creek
        - Hannah Lake
        - Moiles Lake
    - Markel Lake
    - Randall Lake
  - (left) Tanner Creek
  - (right) Sherman Creek
  - (left) West Branch Chippewa River
    - (right) Brown Creek
    - (right) Helmer Creek
    - Winchester Dam forming the Martiny Lake Flooding
      - Tubbs Lake
      - Lost Lake
      - Diamond Lake
      - Big Evans Lake
        - Roundy Branch
          - Hills Lake
          - Pine Lake
      - Upper Evans Lake
      - Manake Lake
      - Lower Evans Lake
        - Chippewa Creek
          - Chippewa Lake
            - Long Lake
      - Saddlebag Lake
      - Bullhead Lake
      - Boom Lake
      - Bass Lake
      - Dogfish Lake
      - Halfmoon Lake
      - Mud Lake
  - (right) North Branch Chippewa River
    - (left) Rattail Creek
      - Rattail Lakes
    - (right) Butts Creek
    - (right) Benjamin Creek
    - (left) Merrill Lake
    - (right) Tubs Lake
    - (right) Atkinson Creek
    - Big Cranberry Lake
      - Mystic Lake
        - Crooked Lake
      - Three Lake Creek
        - Three Lake

== Drainage basin ==
(Including the Pine River)

- Clare County
  - Garfield Township
  - Surrey Township
- Gratiot County
  - City of Alma
  - Arcada Township
  - Bethany Township
  - Emerson Township
  - Pine River Township
  - City of St. Louis
  - Seville Township
  - Sumner Township
  - New Haven Township
  - Newark Township
  - Wheeler Township
- Isabella County
  - Broomfield Township
  - Chippewa Township
  - Coe Township
  - Coldwater Township
  - Deerfield Township
  - Fremont Township
  - Gilmore Township
  - Isabella Township
  - Lincoln Township
  - City of Mount Pleasant
  - Nottawa Township
  - Rolland Township
  - Village of Shepherd
  - Sherman Township
  - Union Township
  - Vernon Township
- Mecosta County
  - Chippewa Township
  - Fork Township
  - Martiny Township
  - Millbrook Township
  - Sheridan Township
  - Wheatland Township
- Midland County
  - Greendale Township
  - Homer Township
  - Jasper Township
  - Lee Township
  - City of Midland
  - Midland Township
  - Mount Haley Township
  - Porter Township
- Montcalm County
  - Ferris Township
  - Home Township
  - Richland Township
- Osceola County
  - Orient Township
