= Coldwater River (Isabella County) =

Stream in Michigan, United States

Coldwater River is a 13.1-mile-long (21.1 km) stream in the U.S. state of Michigan. Located in Isabella County, the river rises as the outflow of Littlefield Lake in western Gilmore Township. The river flows mostly south and empties into the Chippewa River at on the western boundary of Deerfield Township, about two miles east of Lake Isabella.

Major tributaries (from the mouth):

- Coldwater Lake, in Nottawa Township
- Lake of the Hills, in Nottawa and Sherman townships
  - Walker Creek, rises in south central Coldwater Township
    - Colley Creek, rises in southwest Coldwater Township
    - Delaney Creek, rises in north central Coldwater Township
- Littlefield Lake in western Gilmore Township
  - Sucker Creek, rises in northwest Gilmore Township
