= Shepherd Public Schools =

Public school district in Michigan

Address
- P. O. Box 219 Shepherd, Isabella County, Michigan, 48883; United States

District information
- Grades: Kindergarten-12
- Superintendent: Carrie Gauthier
- Schools: 5
- Budget: $26,319,000 2022-2023 expenditures
- NCES District ID: 2631380

Students and staff
- Students: 1,746 (2024-2025)
- Teachers: 98.4 (on an FTE basis) (2024-2025)
- Staff: 248.65 FTE (2024-2025)
- Student–teacher ratio: 17.74 (2024-2025)

Other information
- Website: www.shepherdschools.net

Shepherd Public Schools is a public school district in Central Michigan. In Isabella County, it serves Shepherd and parts of the townships of Chippewa, Coe, Denver, Fremont, and Lincoln. It also serves small sections of the townships of Pine River and Seville in Gratiot County and Greendale and Jasper in Midland County.

== History ==
For many years, education in Shepherd was provided in the "old red brick schoolhouse," which stood between 1904 and 1966. It faced East Maple Street near the end of Fifth Street on the site of the current Shepherd Elementary. It is not to be confused with the Little Red Schoolhouse, a frame building once known as Landon School that was moved to its present site near the high school in 1945 and is currently used as a museum.

Elementary students attended the 1904 brick schoolhouse as well as a small elementary school built nearby in 1948 and expanded in 1949.

High school students attended the 1904 brick schoolhouse until the current high school opened in November 1960. It then became a junior high/elementary building. Construction began on a new Shepherd Elementary in 1965. The 1904 school was torn down the next year.

A bond issue passed in 2007 funded renovations and additions at schools in the district.

== Schools ==
Schools in Shepherd Public Schools district
School	Address	Notes
Shepherd High School	321 S. Fourth Street, Shepherd	Grades 9-12
Odyssey Middle/High School	3441 S. Wise Rd., Mt. Pleasant	Grades 7-12. Alternative and online education
Shepherd Middle School	350 S. Chippewa Street, Shepherd	Grades 6-8
Shepherd Elementary	301 S. Fourth Street, Shepherd	Grades PreK-5
Winn Elementary	418 W. Blanchard, Shepherd	Grades K-5
