= Isabella Indian Reservation =

Isabella Indian Reservation Ishkonganing Bendige'ing
- Indian reservation
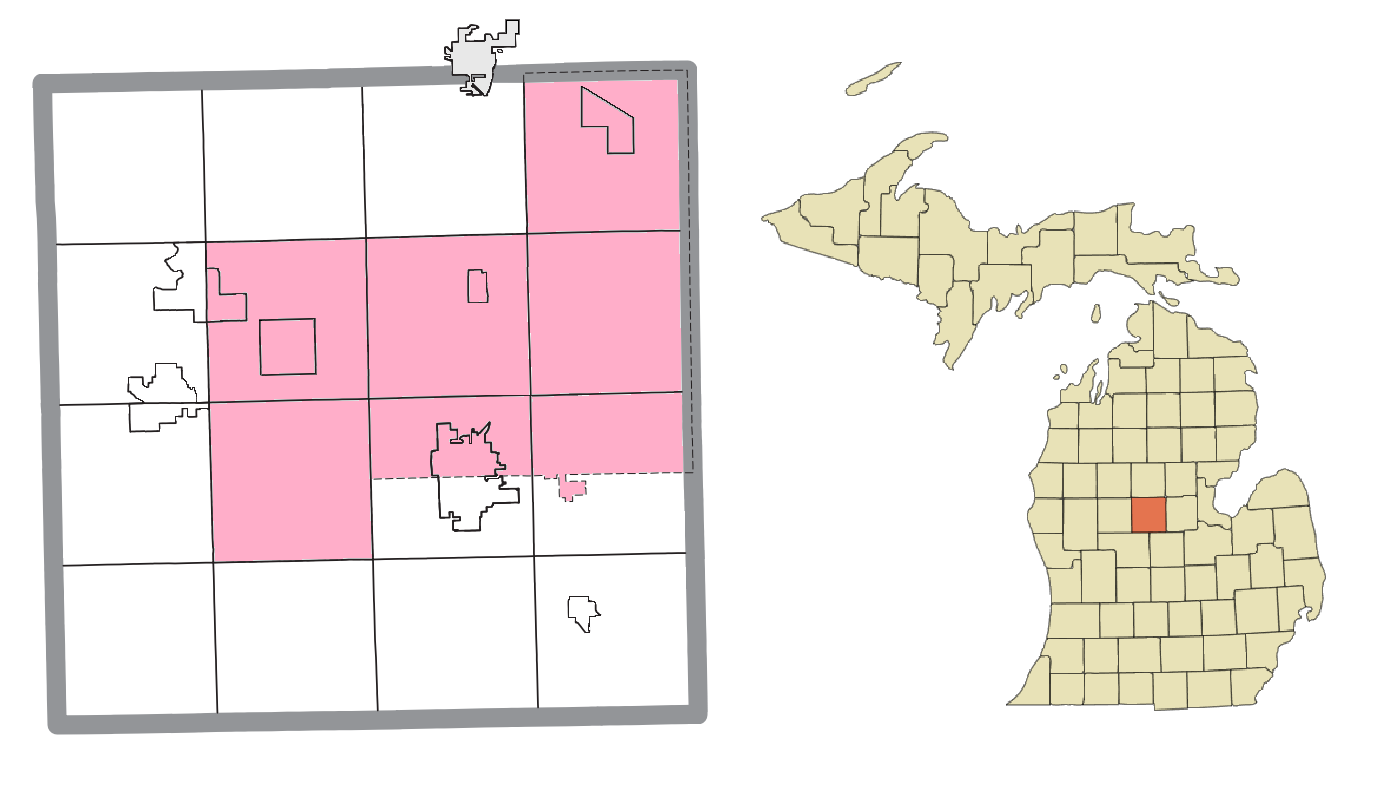
- Location within Isabella County with underlying local municipal boundaries

- Location within the state of Michigan
- Coordinates: 43°40′24″N 84°46′34″W
- Country: United States
- State: Michigan
- Counties: Isabella, Arenac

Government
  - Type: Tribal Council
  - Tribal Chief: Theresa Jackson
  - Tribal Sub-Chief: Joseph Kequom

Area
  - Total: 217.67 sq mi (563.8 km^{2})
- Elevation: 745 ft (227 m)

Population (2010)
  - Total: 26,274
  - Density: 120.71/sq mi (46.605/km^{2})
- Time zone: UTC-5 (EST)
  - Summer (DST): UTC-4 (EDT)
- Area code: 989
- GNIS feature ID: 1618873
- Website: Official website

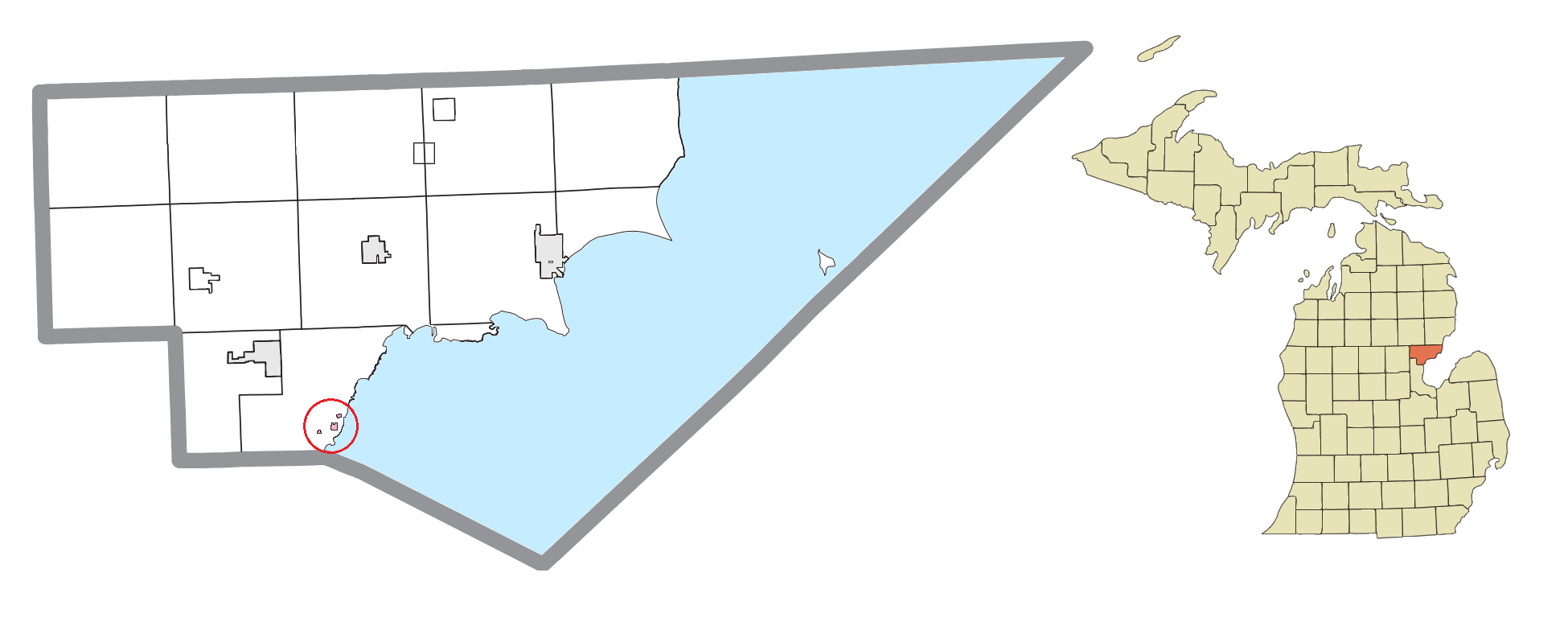
Locations within Arenac County

The Isabella Indian Reservation is the primary land base of the federally recognized Saginaw Chippewa Tribal Nation, located in Isabella County in the central part of the U.S. state of Michigan. The tribe also has some small parcels of off-reservation trust land in Standish Township, Arenac County, near Saginaw Bay and southeast of the city of Standish. Tribal lands are held in trust by the federal government on behalf of the nation.

The tribe owns and operates the Soaring Eagle Casino & Resort in Mount Pleasant and the Saganing Eagles Landing Casino in Standish.

The Tribe entered into an agreement with the state to expand its law enforcement jurisdiction to enforce laws on its members. This expanded area is for law enforcement and its members only and not the Mt. Pleasant community as a whole.

== Communities ==
- Beal City (in Nottawa Township)
- Loomis (in Wise Township)
- Mount Pleasant (part, population 8,741)
- Rosebush (in Isabella Township)
- Weidman (part in Nottawa Township, population 292)

== Townships ==
All townships are in Isabella County, except Standish Township, which is in Arenac County

- Chippewa Township (part)
- Deerfield Township
- Denver Township
- Isabella Township
- Mount Pleasant (part; city that is not included in any other township)
- Nottawa Township
- Standish Township, Arenac County (very small parts of the township)
- Union Township (part)
- Wise Township
