= Shepherd High School =

Shepherd High School may refer to:

- Shepherd High School, in the Shepherd Public School District in Shepherd, Michigan
- Shepherd High School (Montana), Shepherd, Montana
- Shepherd High School (Texas), Shepherd, Texas
- Shepherd Hill Regional High School, Dudley, Massachusetts
