= O-saw-wah-pon =

Leader of the Saginaw Band of the Ojibwe

O-saw-wah-pon (c. 1798-1859) was a leader of the Saginaw Band of the Ojibwe. He was a friend of Lewis Cass and in general sided with the Americans and opposed Tecumseh's plans for war. He was born in what is today the eastern part of Saginaw, Michigan and died in Isabella County, Michigan.

== Sources ==
- History of Saginaw County, Michigan (PDF). Charles C. Chapman & Co. 1881. pp. 134–135.
