= Beal City, Michigan =

- Census-designated place (CDP) & unincorporated community
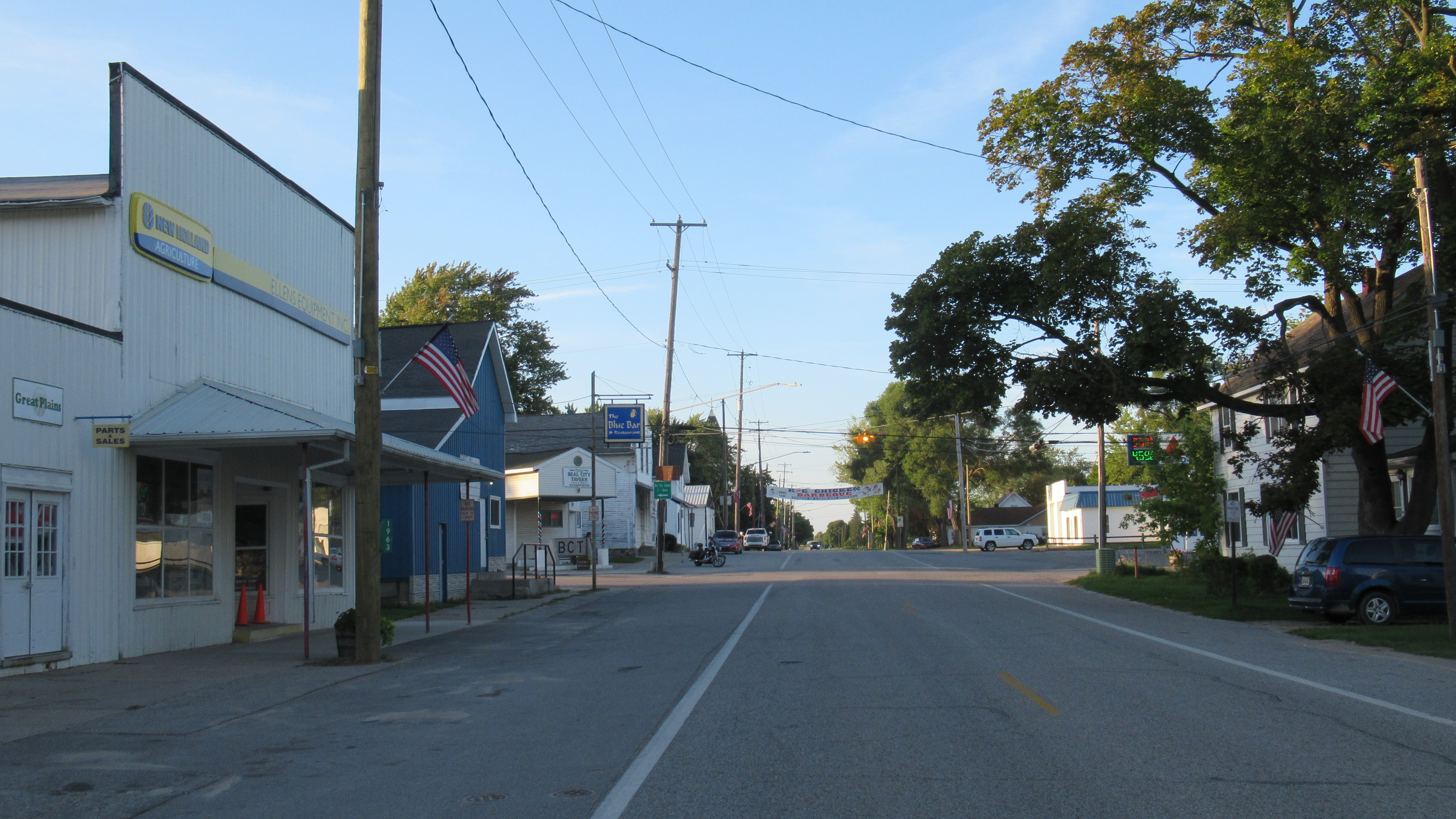
- Looking north along North Winn Road

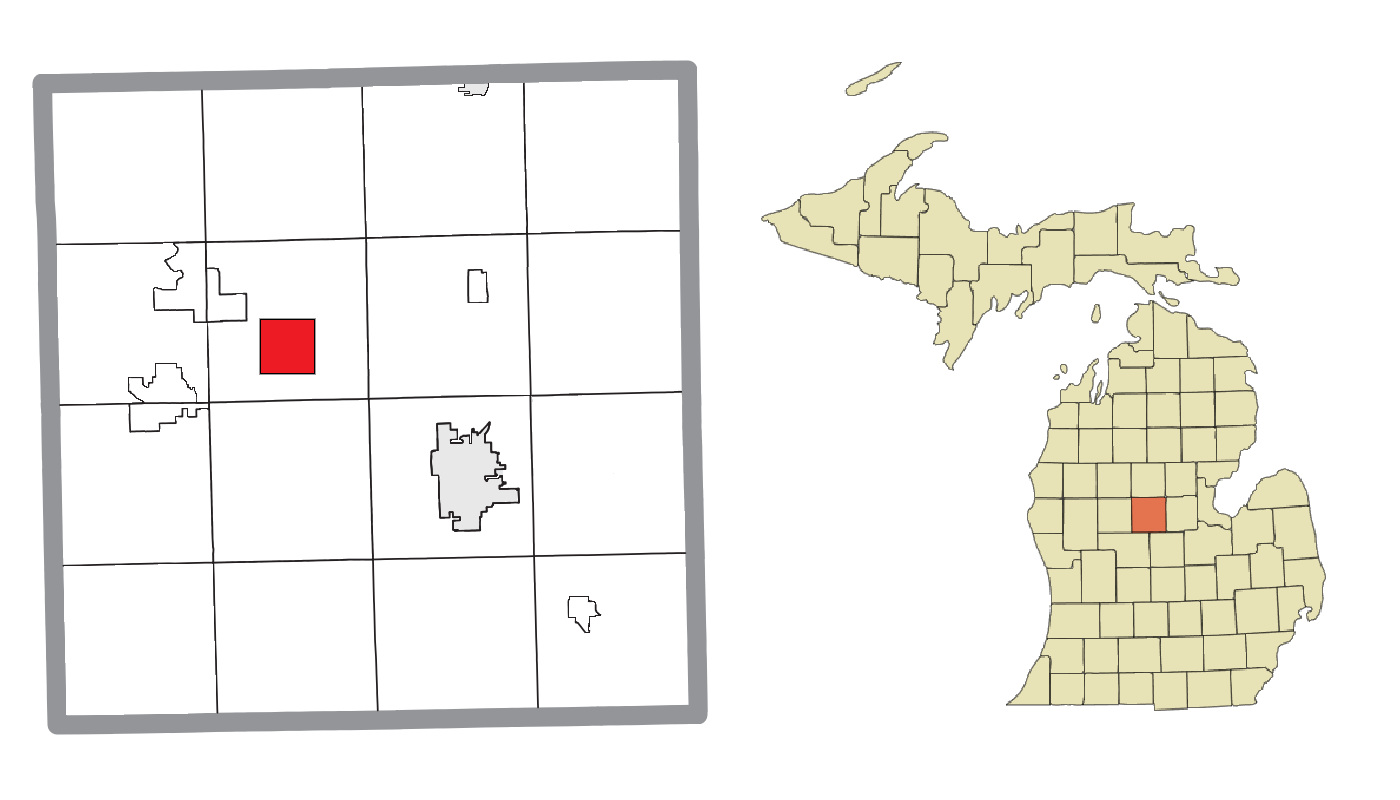
- Location within Isabella County

- Location within the state of Michigan Location within the United States
- Coordinates: 43°40′09″N 84°54′31″W
- Country: United States
- State: Michigan
- County: Isabella
- Township: Nottawa
- Settled: 1880

Area
  - Total: 4.01 sq mi (10.39 km^{2})
  - Land: 4.01 sq mi (10.39 km^{2})
  - Water: 0 sq mi (0.00 km^{2})
- Elevation: 863 ft (263 m)

Population (2020)
  - Total: 332
  - Density: 82.79/sq mi (31.97/km^{2})
- Time zone: UTC-5 (Eastern (EST))
  - Summer (DST): UTC-4 (EDT)
- ZIP code(s): 48858 (Mt. Pleasant); 48893 (Weidman)
- Area code: 989
- FIPS code: 26-06360
- GNIS feature ID: 0620813

Beal City is an unincorporated community and census-designated place (CDP) in Isabella County in the U.S. state of Michigan. The population of the CDP was 332 at the 2020 census. As an unincorporated community, Beal City has no legal autonomy of its own. The community is located in Nottawa Township within the Isabella Indian Reservation.

== History ==
Beal City was settled around 1880 by Mr. Beal, who opened a grocery store. A post office operated here from December 19, 1892 until March 31, 1910.

Beginning in 1989, the Tom Bowl is an annual football game that takes places in Beal City.

== Geography ==
According to the U.S. Census Bureau, the CDP has a total area of 4.01 square miles (10.39 km^{2}), all land. The land drains east toward the North Branch of the Chippewa River, which is part of the Saginaw River watershed.

The community is served by its own school district, Beal City Public Schools, which also serves larger portions of the surrounding area.

== Demographics ==
Historical population
Census	Pop.	Note	%±
1990	345		—
2000	345		0.0%
2010	357		3.5%
2020	332		−7.0%
U.S. Decennial Census

As of the census of 2000, there were 345 people, 124 households, and 91 families residing in the CDP. The population density was 86.1 inhabitants per square mile (33.2/km^{2}). There were 131 housing units at an average density of 32.7 per square mile (12.6/km^{2}). The racial makeup of the CDP was 98.84% White, 0.29% Native American, 0.29% from other races, and 0.58% from two or more races. Hispanic or Latino of any race were 0.29% of the population.

There were 124 households, out of which 38.7% had children under the age of 18 living with them, 63.7% were married couples living together, 4.0% had a female householder with no husband present, and 26.6% were non-families. 20.2% of all households were made up of individuals, and 8.1% had someone living alone who was 65 years of age or older. The average household size was 2.77 and the average family size was 3.24.

In the CDP, the population was spread out, with 31.3% under the age of 18, 7.5% from 18 to 24, 30.1% from 25 to 44, 16.2% from 45 to 64, and 14.8% who were 65 years of age or older. The median age was 34 years. For every 100 females, there were 98.3 males. For every 100 females age 18 and over, there were 99.2 males.

The median income for a household in the CDP was $37,500, and the median income for a family was $50,250. Males had a median income of $31,875 versus $33,750 for females. The per capita income for the CDP was $16,185. About 5.5% of families and 10.3% of the population were below the poverty line, including 8.2% of those under age 18 and 8.5% of those age 65 or over.

== Unknown Number: The High School Catfish ==
In 2022, Beal City became the center of a national news story after a woman was charged with sending hateful and bullying messages to teenage students, including her own daughter, under a fake name and number. Kendra Licari sent the messages over a period of 15 months. She pleaded guilty to two counts of stalking a minor and was sentenced to at least 19 months in prison. The story was the subject of the 2025 Netflix documentary Unknown Number: The High School Catfish.

== Notable people ==
- John Engler, politician and former governor of Michigan, grew up near Beal City
- Dan Schafer, pop and country songwriter/musician
- Roger Hauck, state politician who was born in Beal City
