= Nottawa Township, Isabella County, Michigan =

Nottawa Township, Michigan
- Civil township
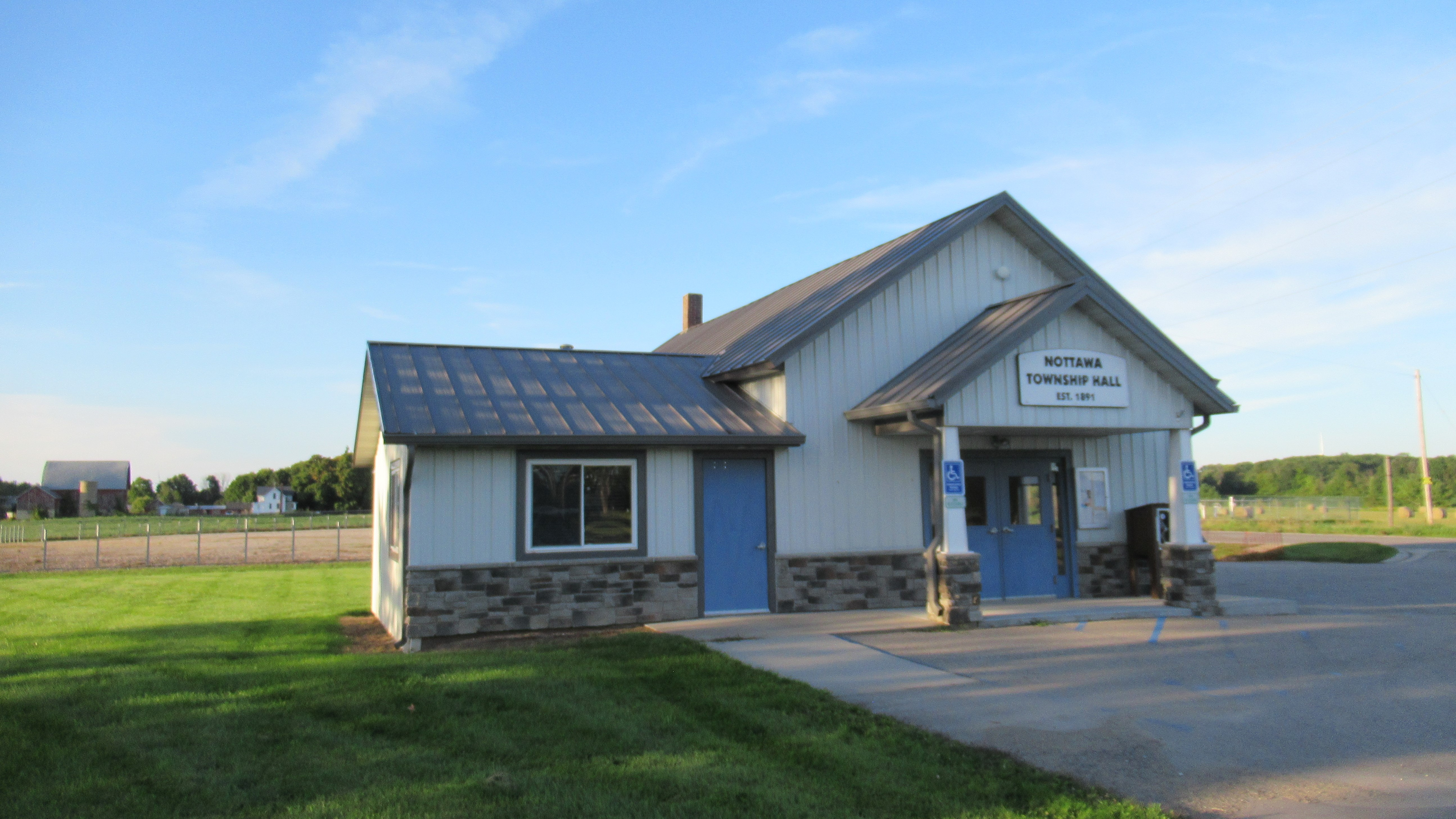
- Nottawa Township Hall

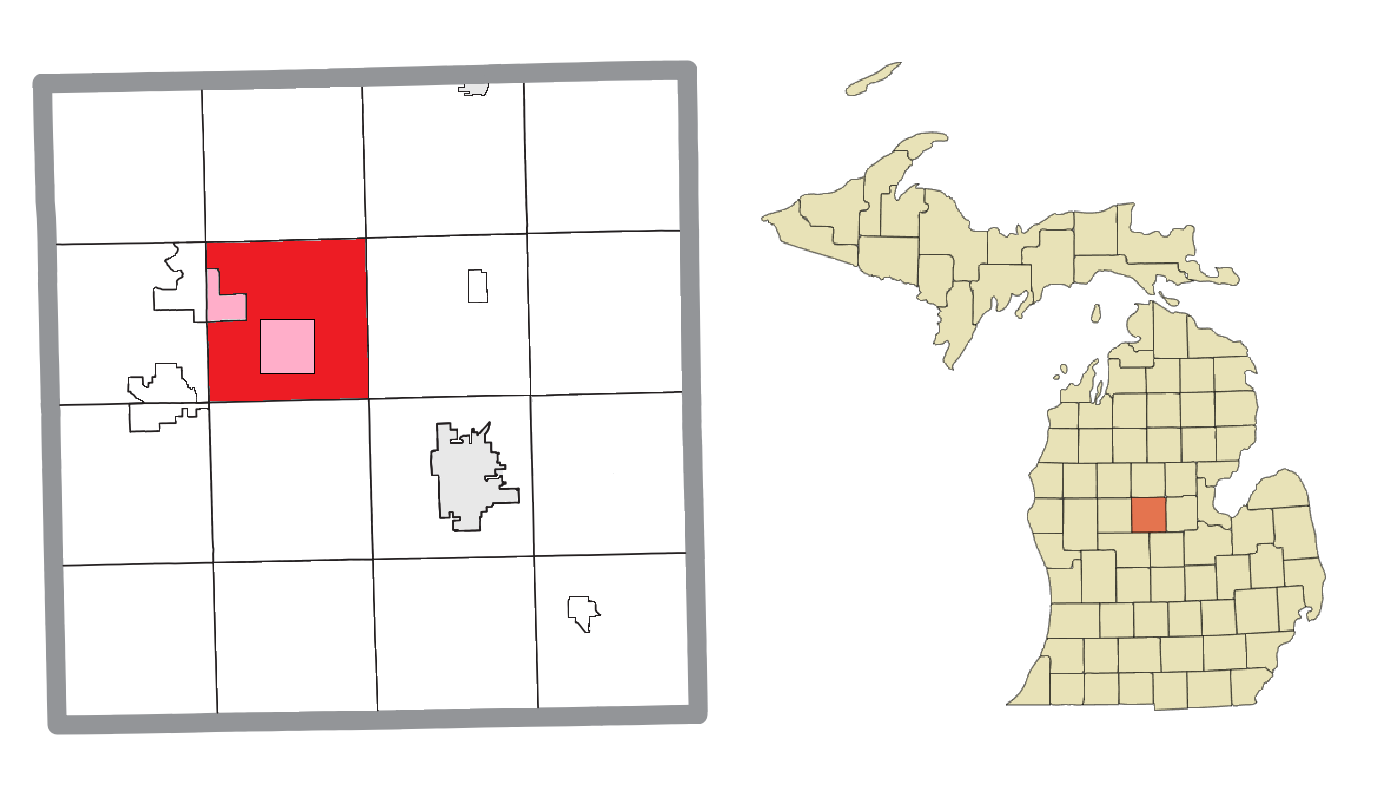
- Location within Isabella County (red) and the administered CDPs of Beal City and portion of Weidman (pink)

- Location within the state of Michigan Location within the United States
- Coordinates: 43°40′33″N 84°54′29″W
- Country: United States
- State: Michigan
- County: Isabella
- Established: 1891

Government
  - Supervisor: Kory Mindel
  - Clerk: Heather Curtiss

Area
  - Total: 35.93 sq mi (93.1 km^{2})
  - Land: 35.31 sq mi (91.5 km^{2})
  - Water: 0.62 sq mi (1.6 km^{2})
- Elevation: 876 ft (267 m)

Population (2020)
  - Total: 2,225
  - Density: 63/sq mi (24/km^{2})
- Time zone: UTC-5 (Eastern (EST))
  - Summer (DST): UTC-4 (EDT)
- ZIP code(s): 48622 (Farwell); 48858 (Mt. Pleasant); 48893 (Weidman)
- Area code: 989
- FIPS code: 26-59360
- GNIS feature ID: 1626826
- Website: Official website

Nottawa Township is a civil township of Isabella County in the U.S. state of Michigan. The population was 2,225 at the 2020 census.

== Communities ==
- Beal City is an unincorporated community and census-designated place in the center of the township.
- Weidman is an unincorporated community and census-designated place in the western portion of the township. The CDP also extends west into Sherman Township.

== History ==
The township's first white settler was Michael McGeehan, who became the first supervisor when the township was organized in 1875. The township was named after a local Ojibwe (Chippewa) chief who lived in the area from 1781 to 1881.

== Geography ==
According to the U.S. Census Bureau, the township has a total area of 35.93 square miles (93.06 km^{2}), of which 35.31 square miles (91.45 km^{2}) is land and 0.62 square miles (1.61 km^{2}) (1.73%) is water.

The entire township is within the boundaries of the Isabella Indian Reservation. The North Branch of the Chippewa River and the Coldwater River flow through the township.

== Demographics ==
As of the census of 2000, there were 2,278 people, 846 households, and 620 families residing in the township. The population density was 64.4 inhabitants per square mile (24.9/km^{2}). There were 951 housing units at an average density of 26.9 per square mile (10.4/km^{2}). The racial makeup of the township was 97.06% White, 0.09% African American, 2.15% Native American, 0.04% Asian, 0.09% from other races, and 0.57% from two or more races. Hispanic or Latino of any race were 0.79% of the population.

There were 846 households, out of which 36.9% had children under the age of 18 living with them, 62.5% were married couples living together, 6.6% had a female householder with no husband present, and 26.7% were non-families. 21.7% of all households were made up of individuals, and 7.3% had someone living alone who was 65 years of age or older. The average household size was 2.69 and the average family size was 3.15.

In the township the population was spread out, with 28.7% under the age of 18, 8.1% from 18 to 24, 31.1% from 25 to 44, 20.7% from 45 to 64, and 11.5% who were 65 years of age or older. The median age was 35 years. For every 100 females, there were 102.0 males. For every 100 females age 18 and over, there were 104.1 males.

The median income for a household in the township was $40,766, and the median income for a family was $46,523. Males had a median income of $31,798 versus $26,438 for females. The per capita income for the township was $18,340. About 4.6% of families and 6.5% of the population were below the poverty line, including 4.5% of those under age 18 and 5.0% of those age 65 or over.

== Education ==
Nottawa Township is served by four separate public school districts. The majority of the township is served by Beal City Public Schools in the community of Beal City. The western portion of the township is served by Chippewa Hills School District in the community of Remus, Michigan to the west in Mecosta County. A very small portion of the northeast corner of the township is served by Farwell Area Schools to the north in the village of Farwell in Clare County. A very small portion of the southeast corner of the township is served by Mount Pleasant Public Schools in the city of Mount Pleasant.

== Notable people ==
- John Engler, politician and former governor of Michigan, grew up near Beal City
- Roger Hauck, state politician who was born in Beal City
- Nathaniel B. Nichols, engineer who was born in Nottawa Township
