= St. John's Episcopal Church (Mount Pleasant, Michigan) =

Historic church in Michigan, United States

- U.S. National Register of Historic Places
- Michigan State Historic Site
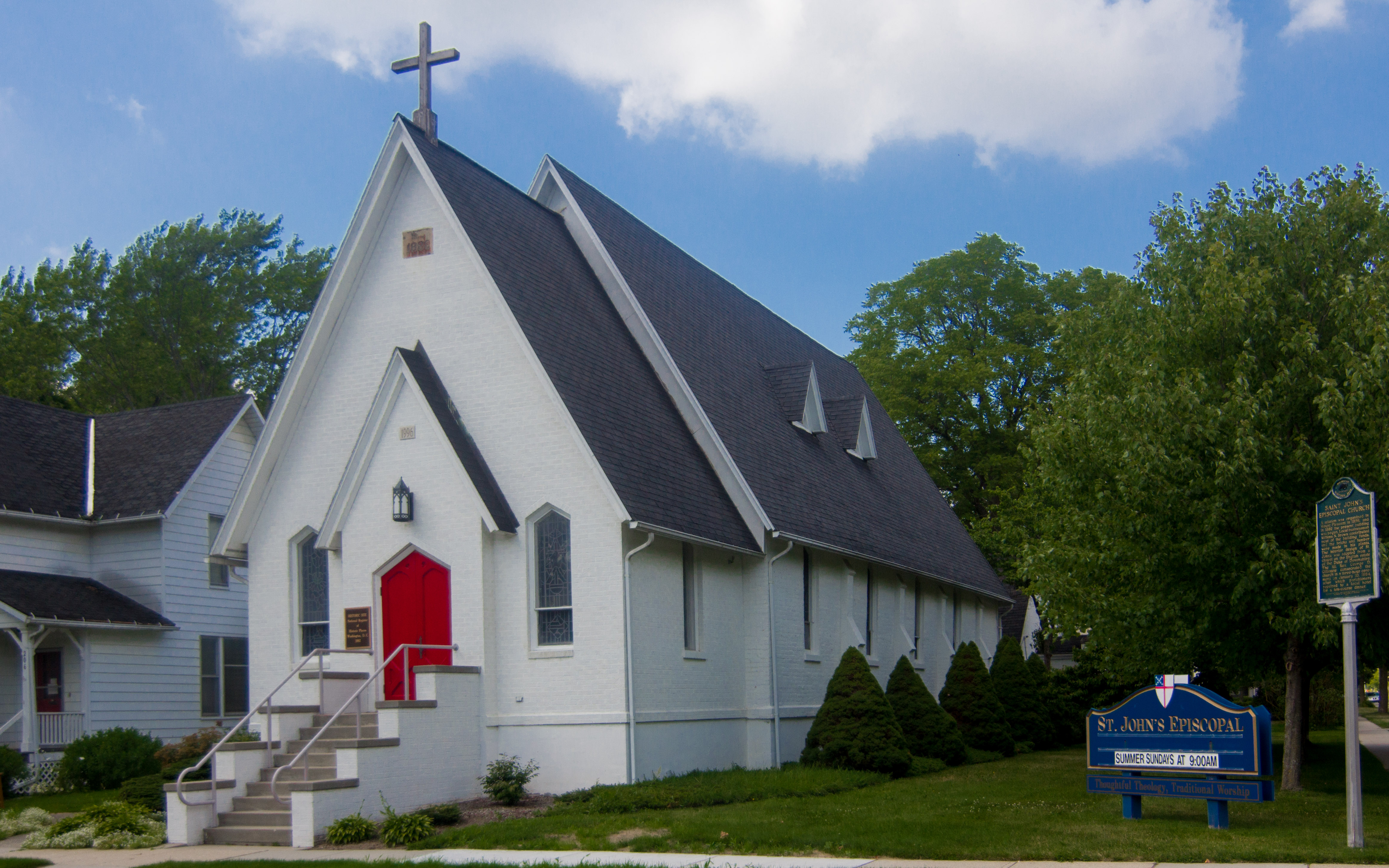
- The church in July 2015

- Location within Michigan Location within the United States
- Interactive map
- Location: 206 W. Maple St., Mount Pleasant, Michigan
- Coordinates: 43°35′59″N 84°46′40″W
- Area: 1 acre (0.40 ha)
- Built: 1882
- Architectural style: Gothic Revival, Other, English Gothic
- NRHP reference No.: 82002842

Significant dates
- Added to NRHP: April 22, 1982
- Designated MSHS: February 11, 1972

St. John's Episcopal Church is a historic church at 206 W. Maple Street in Mount Pleasant, Michigan. It was built in 1882 and added to the National Register of Historic Places in 1982.

St. John’s Episcopal Church is a member of the Episcopal Diocese of the Great Lakes and the Episcopal Church (United States). Originally begun as a mission in 1876, the church was built in 1882. It is the oldest existing Mount Pleasant church building that is still used for worship today.

== History ==
Known locally as “the church with the red doors,” St. John’s was initially established as a mission church in 1876 by circuit riders. The church’s cornerstone was laid in 1882. All the building materials for the church were donated by local businessman William N. Brown, with the bricks made at his own yard, lumber from his sawmill, and the excavation and finishing work completed by his employees.

St. John’s is the oldest surviving active place of worship in Mount Pleasant, Michigan. The Rt. Rev. George De Normandie Gillespie, first Bishop of the Episcopal Diocese of Western Michigan, consecrated the church on January 10, 1884. In 1996, the church building underwent extensive restoration and renovations, much of which was completed by parishioners.

== Building description ==
St. John's Episcopal Church is a single story, white-painted brick building with a steep gable roof, measuring 92 feet by 32 feet. The shed-roofed front entryway projects from the facade of the church, and is reached via a staircase. The interior is reached through a pair of entry doors with sharp upper points. The two sides of the church contain English Gothic recessed stained glass windows spaced at regular intervals.

The church interior was modeled on the Riding House at Bolsover Castle in Bolsover, England. The floor is wood and tongue-in-groove wainscoting lines the walls. The vaulted ceiling has heavy wood beams. All liturgical appointments, including the pulpit, lectern, altar, and altar rail, are made of maple.

== Historical Marker ==
St. John’s was registered with the State of Michigan's Historical Marker Program and received a historical marker in 1972. It was placed on the National Register of Historic Places in 1982.

== Women’s Guild ==
The Women’s Guild at St. John’s, originally called the Ladies’ Guild, existed from 1886 to 1974. The Women’s Guild was largely responsible for keeping the church going during rough times and paying the bills.

== Notable priests ==
The Rev. John H. Rippey, M.D., served as acting rector of several churches on a circuit, including St. John’s, from 1887 through 1910. His work at the church, and the lives of parishioners are documented in a journal and parish registry book, 1887-1911, and three scrapbooks, 1874-1935, and undated, as well as in two handwritten services from July 1908.

Rev. John H. Goodrow served as rector at St. John’s from 1962 until his sudden death in 1985. Rev. Goodrow was very aware of those in need in the community and privately assisted many through the help of wealthier friends in the local oil community. During his tenure, he strongly supported "Food with Friends," a Commission on Aging program that provided nightly meals in the parish hall for community members. He was also responsible for many other community outreach initiatives, including the St. John’s Emergency Food Program.

The Goodrow Fund at St. John’s was established and named in his honor (in 1986?). The Fund’s intent is “to provide emergency assistance, including food, shelter, clothing, medicine, gasoline, or other support. This fund maintains a particular interest in serving the special needs of community members . . . not met or fulfilled by other community resources.” Because of its community outreach via the Goodrow Fund, St. John’s was recognized by the Episcopal Church (United States) as a Jubilee Ministry, or a ministry which “engages congregations in the important work of empowering people to change their lives.”

== Music program ==
St. John’s has for many years had a music program. The choir and organist perform a range of music from early plainsong to modern pieces, some of which have been commissioned for the church. The church funds four choral students from Central Michigan University’s School of Music who sing with the choir. Over time, choirs have included a men and boys’ choir, various children’s choirs, and a mixed adult choir.

== Organ ==
Since 1972 the church has had a Gabriel Kney tracker pipe organ.

== Center for Christian Spirituality ==
The Center for Christian Spirituality was established at St. John’s in 2008 for the purpose of helping people develop a deeper relationship with God. Various workshops and presentations have included quiet days for laity and clergy, Celtic Christianity, Aging and Spirituality, Native American spirituality, Spirituality and Work, and a study of Handel’s Messiah, among others.
