= Coe Township, Michigan =

- Civil township
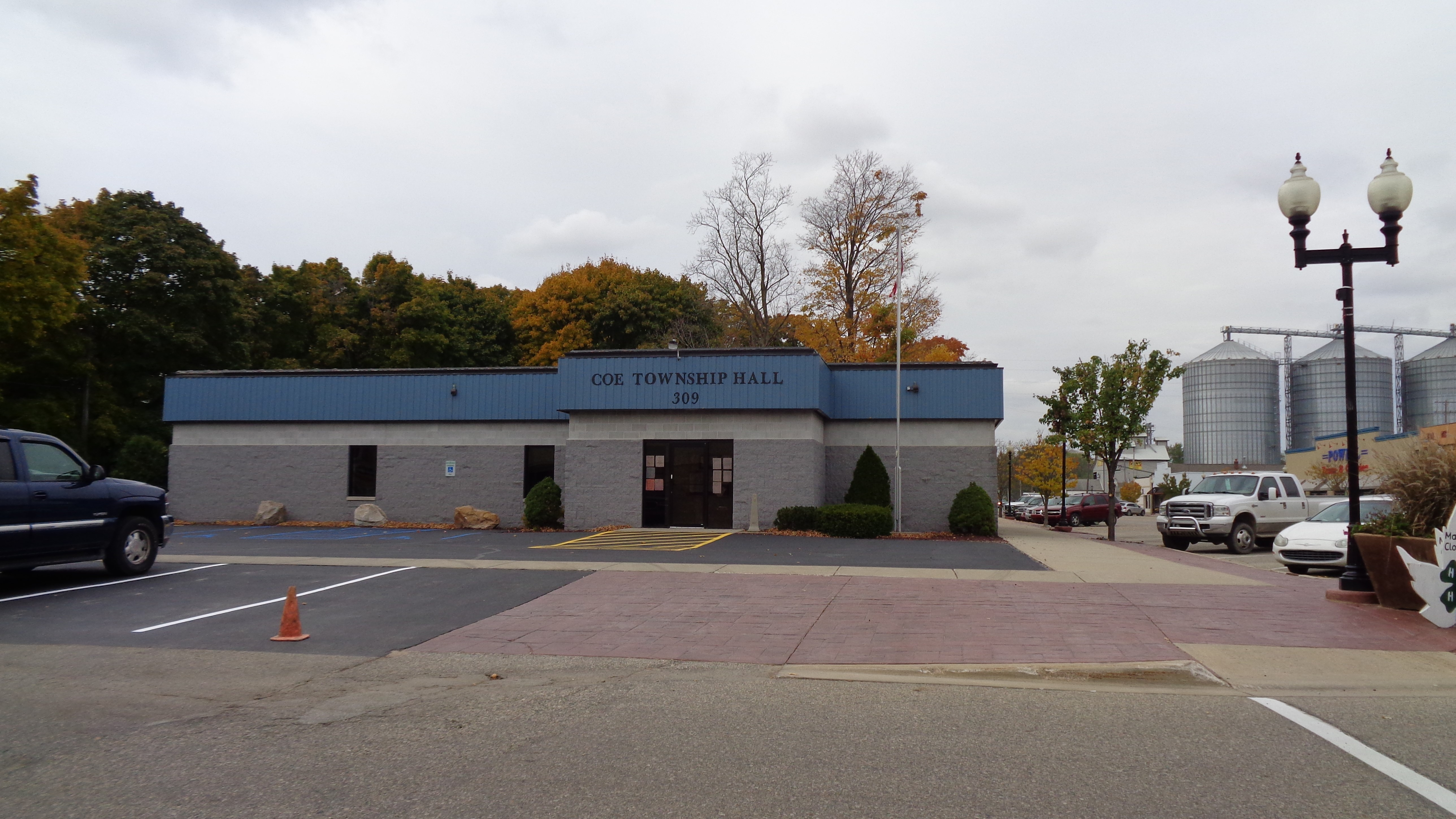
- Coe Township Hall in Shepherd

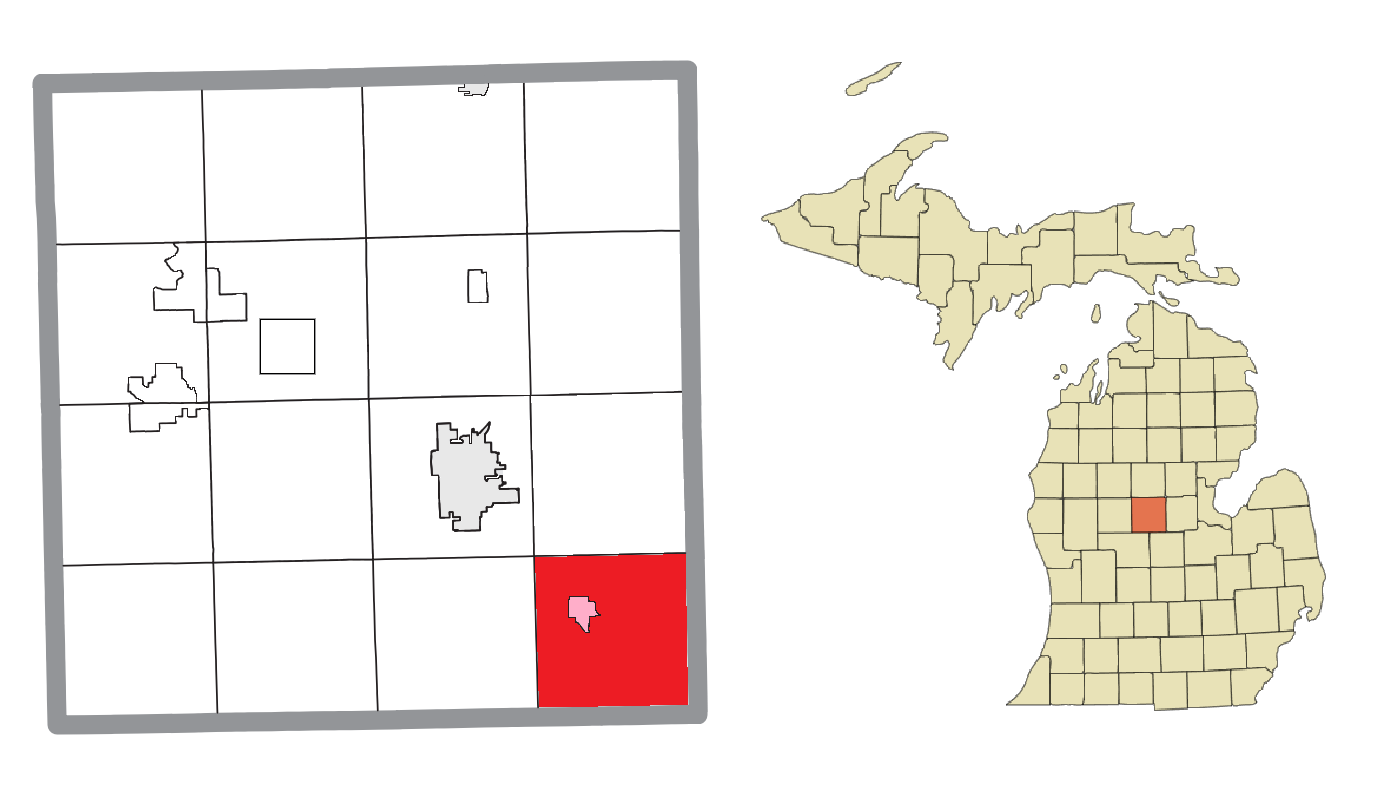
- Location within Isabella County (red) and the administered village of Shepherd (pink)

- Location within the state of Michigan Coe Township (the United States)
- Coordinates: 43°30′17″N 84°40′21″W
- Country: United States
- State: Michigan
- County: Isabella

Area
  - Total: 36.2 sq mi (93.8 km^{2})
  - Land: 36.2 sq mi (93.8 km^{2})
  - Water: 0 sq mi (0.0 km^{2})
- Elevation: 761 ft (232 m)

Population (2020)
  - Total: 3,032
  - Density: 83.7/sq mi (32.3/km^{2})
- Time zone: UTC-5 (Eastern (EST))
  - Summer (DST): UTC-4 (EDT)
- ZIP code(s): 48883
- Area code: 989
- FIPS code: 26-16880
- GNIS feature ID: 1626105

Coe Township is a civil township of Isabella County in the U.S. state of Michigan. The population was 3,032 at the 2020 census.

== Communities ==
- The village of Shepherd is within the township and the Shepherd post office, with ZIP code 48883, also serves all of Coe Township.
- Coe is an unincorporated community in the township at 43°28′50″N 84°38′32″W Perry H. Estee made the first land entry in the area in 1854 and James Woolsey, Daniel Brickley, and John Steward with their families became the first settlers in that year. The township was organized in 1855 and was named for Michigan Lt. Governor George A. Coe. A post office operated from August 17, 1891, until December 14, 1904.

== Geography ==
According to the United States Census Bureau, the township has a total area of 36.2 square miles (94 km^{2}), all land.

== Demographics ==
As of the census of 2000, there were 2,993 people, 1,166 households, and 834 families residing in the township. The population density was 82.6 inhabitants per square mile (31.9/km^{2}). There were 1,219 housing units at an average density of 33.6 per square mile (13.0/km^{2}). The racial makeup of the township was 96.89% White, 0.30% African American, 0.67% Native American, 0.30% Asian, 0.07% Pacific Islander, 0.70% from other races, and 1.07% from two or more races. Hispanic or Latino of any race were 1.67% of the population.

There were 1,166 households, out of which 34.7% had children under the age of 18 living with them, 58.3% were married couples living together, 9.2% had a female householder with no husband present, and 28.4% were non-families. 25.1% of all households were made up of individuals, and 9.2% had someone living alone who was 65 years of age or older. The average household size was 2.56 and the average family size was 3.07.

In the township the population was spread out, with 26.8% under the age of 18, 9.6% from 18 to 24, 28.2% from 25 to 44, 23.6% from 45 to 64, and 11.7% who were 65 years of age or older. The median age was 37 years. For every 100 females, there were 98.7 males. For every 100 females age 18 and over, there were 91.9 males.

The median income for a household in the township was $45,182, and the median income for a family was $52,738. Males had a median income of $33,092 versus $23,375 for females. The per capita income for the township was $19,435. About 5.1% of families and 6.4% of the population were below the poverty line, including 8.6% of those under age 18 and 4.3% of those age 65 or over.
