= Denver Township, Isabella County, Michigan =

Denver Township, Michigan
- Civil township
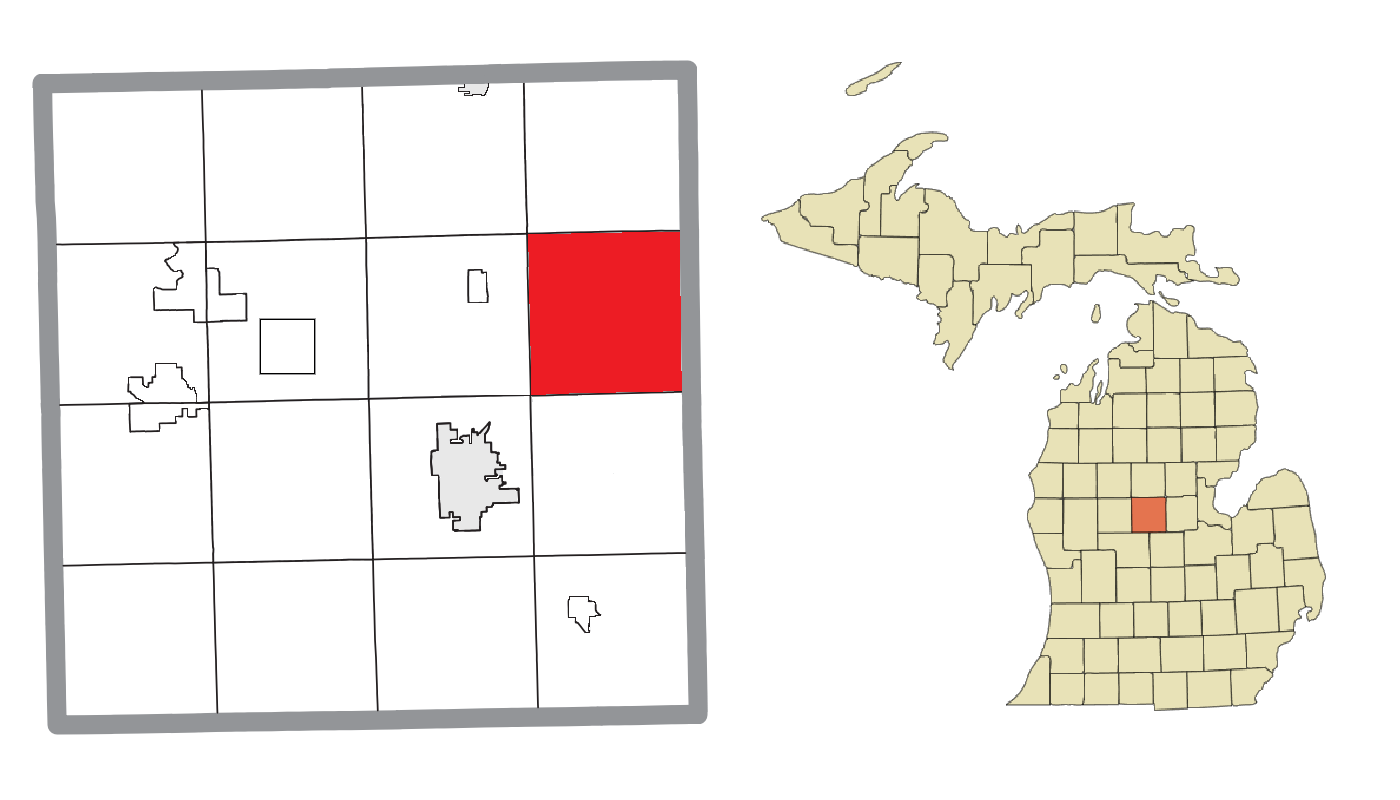
- Location within Isabella County

- Location within the state of Michigan Denver Township (the United States)
- Coordinates: 43°41′01″N 84°40′12″W
- Country: United States
- State: Michigan
- County: Isabella
- Established: 1876

Area
  - Total: 36.5 sq mi (94.6 km^{2})
  - Land: 36.5 sq mi (94.6 km^{2})
  - Water: 0 sq mi (0.0 km^{2})
- Elevation: 719 ft (219 m)

Population (2020)
  - Total: 1,199
  - Density: 32.8/sq mi (12.7/km^{2})
- Time zone: UTC-5 (Eastern (EST))
  - Summer (DST): UTC-4 (EDT)
- ZIP code(s): 48858, 48618, 48878
- Area code: 989
- FIPS code: 26-21680
- GNIS feature ID: 1626178

Denver Township is a civil township of Isabella County, Michigan, United States, established in 1876. The population was 1,199 at the 2020 census.

== Communities ==
- Delwin is an unincorporated community in the township at 43°41′50″N 84°40′41″W. Delwin was a station on the Pere Marquette Railroad and a post office operated from April 27, 1880, until November 15, 1906. 54 lots were platted in 1888.
- Leaton is an unincorporated community in the township at 43°40′12″N 84°42′30″W. The community is named for attorney James C. Leaton, who lived in Mount Pleasant and also engaged in real estate and lumbering operations throughout the county. A post office was established on March 1, 1880, with William Allenbaugh as the first postmaster. It was a station on the Pere Marquette Railroad and was platted by the firm of Leaton & Upton (J.C. Leaton and A.B. Upton) in 1886.

== Geography ==
According to the United States Census Bureau, the township has a total area of 36.5 square miles (95 km^{2}), of which 36.5 square miles (95 km^{2}) is land and 0.04 square miles (0.10 km^{2}) (0.05%) is water.

== Demographics ==
As of the census of 2000, there were 1,147 people, 415 households, and 304 families residing in the township. The population density was 31.4 inhabitants per square mile (12.1/km^{2}). There were 446 housing units at an average density of 12.2 per square mile (4.7/km^{2}). The racial makeup of the township was 93.37% White, 0.26% African American, 4.10% Native American, 0.17% from other races, and 2.09% from two or more races. Hispanic or Latino of any race were 2.70% of the population.

There were 415 households, out of which 37.8% had children under the age of 18 living with them, 59.8% were married couples living together, 8.7% had a female householder with no husband present, and 26.7% were non-families. 22.7% of all households were made up of individuals, and 9.9% had someone living alone who was 65 years of age or older. The average household size was 2.75 and the average family size was 3.19.

In the township the population was spread out, with 28.4% under the age of 18, 9.9% from 18 to 24, 31.4% from 25 to 44, 20.8% from 45 to 64, and 9.4% who were 65 years of age or older. The median age was 34 years. For every 100 females, there were 96.4 males. For every 100 females aged 18 and over, there were 92.7 males.

The median income for a household in the township was $41,181, and the median income for a family was $44,926. Males had a median income of $30,938 versus $20,156 for females. The per capita income for the township was $17,480. About 5.2% of families and 9.6% of the population were below the poverty line, including 11.1% of those under age 18 and 2.2% of those age 65 or over.
