= Lincoln Township, Isabella County, Michigan =

Lincoln Township, Michigan
- Civil township
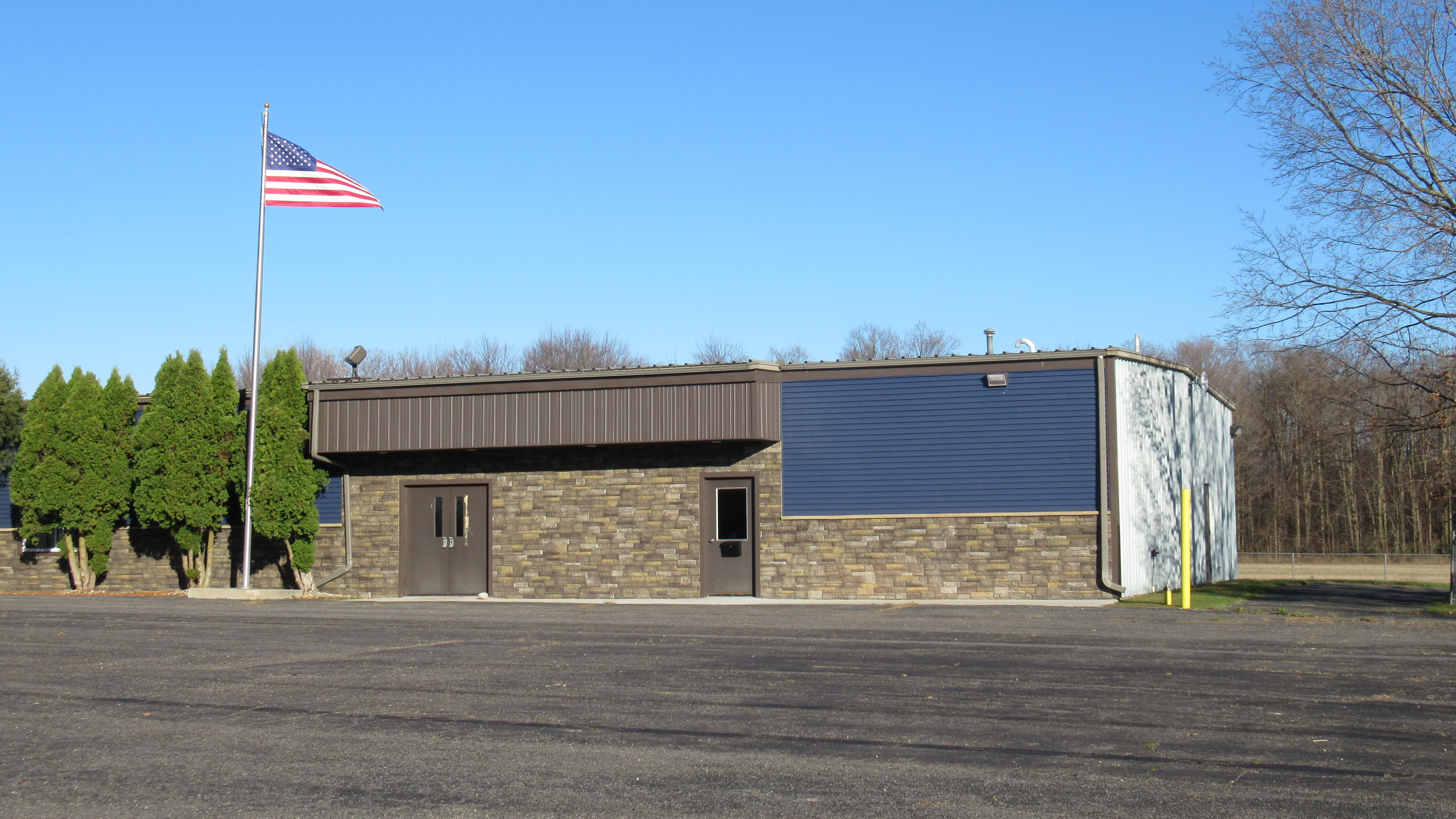
- Lincoln Township Hall

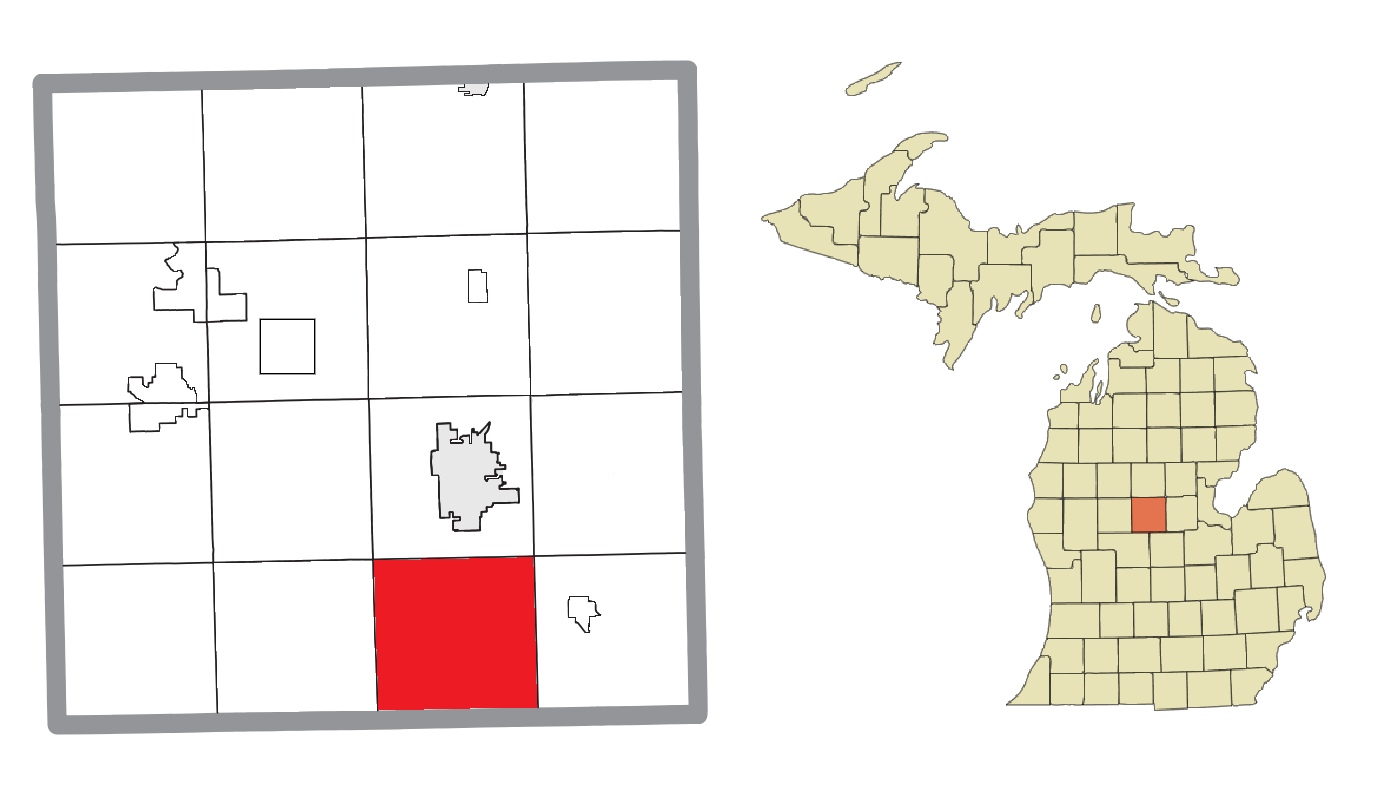
- Location within Isabella County

- Location within the state of Michigan Location within the United States
- Coordinates: 43°30′37″N 84°47′08″W
- Country: United States
- State: Michigan
- County: Isabella

Area
  - Total: 36.2 sq mi (93.7 km^{2})
  - Land: 36.1 sq mi (93.6 km^{2})
  - Water: 0.077 sq mi (0.2 km^{2})
- Elevation: 801 ft (244 m)

Population (2020)
  - Total: 2,069
  - Density: 57.3/sq mi (22.1/km^{2})
- Time zone: UTC-5 (Eastern (EST))
  - Summer (DST): UTC-4 (EDT)
- ZIP code(s): 48858, 48883
- Area code: 989
- FIPS code: 26-47660
- GNIS feature ID: 1626622

Lincoln Township is a civil township of Isabella County in the U.S. state of Michigan. The population was 2,069 at the 2020 census.

== Geography ==
According to the United States Census Bureau, the township has a total area of 36.2 square miles (93.7 km^{2}), of which 36.1 square miles (93.6 km^{2}) is land and 0.1 square mile (0.2 km^{2}) (0.19%) is water.

== Communities ==
- Irishtown was an unincorporated community located on E. South County Line Road between S. Mission Road and S. Isabella Road at 43°28′01″N 84°45′43″W. Founded by Irish immigrants before the county lines were clearly marked, the community thrived in its relative isolation. New St. Patrick's Church, commonly known now as Irishtown Church, is a Catholic Church built by the residents, and is the second church to be located on the site. The church is the only extant building left of the original community, along with its cemetery. The church is located on the south side of the road in neighboring Seville Township in Gratiot County.

== Demographics ==
As of the census of 2000, there were 1,936 people, 696 households, and 533 families residing in the township. The population density was 53.6 inhabitants per square mile (20.7/km^{2}). There were 726 housing units at an average density of 20.1 per square mile (7.8/km^{2}). The racial makeup of the township was 96.13% White, 0.88% African American, 0.67% Native American, 0.10% Asian, 0.05% Pacific Islander, 0.88% from other races, and 1.29% from two or more races. Hispanic or Latino of any race were 2.84% of the population.

There were 696 households, out of which 38.8% had children under the age of 18 living with them, 63.6% were married couples living together, 7.6% had a female householder with no husband present, and 23.4% were non-families. 18.0% of all households were made up of individuals, and 6.5% had someone living alone who was 65 years of age or older. The average household size was 2.76 and the average family size was 3.15.

In the township the population was spread out, with 28.8% under the age of 18, 8.2% from 18 to 24, 31.2% from 25 to 44, 22.5% from 45 to 64, and 9.3% who were 65 years of age or older. The median age was 34 years. For every 100 females, there were 101.2 males. For every 100 females age 18 and over, there were 102.2 males.

The median income for a household in the township was $44,871, and the median income for a family was $47,574. Males had a median income of $33,250 versus $24,167 for females. The per capita income for the township was $18,734. About 4.3% of families and 7.0% of the population were below the poverty line, including 9.9% of those under age 18 and 9.2% of those age 65 or over.
