= Coldwater Township, Isabella County, Michigan =

Coldwater Township, Michigan
- Civil township
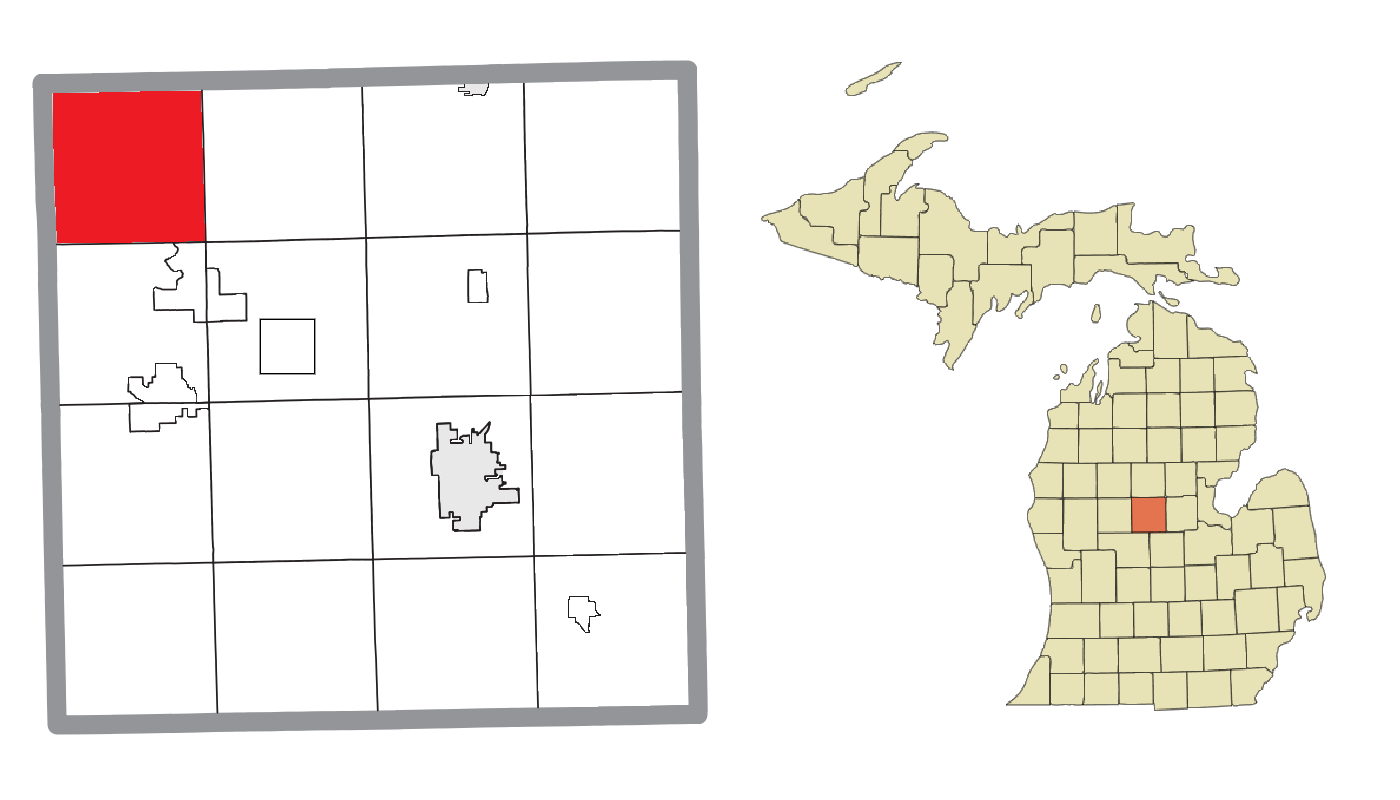
- Location within Isabella County

- Location within the state of Michigan Coldwater Township (the United States)
- Coordinates: 43°46′25″N 85°02′12″W
- Country: United States
- State: Michigan
- County: Isabella

Area
  - Total: 35.9 sq mi (93.1 km^{2})
  - Land: 35.9 sq mi (92.9 km^{2})
  - Water: 0.077 sq mi (0.2 km^{2})
- Elevation: 1,056 ft (322 m)

Population (2020)
  - Total: 801
  - Density: 22/sq mi (8.6/km^{2})
- Time zone: UTC-5 (Eastern (EST))
  - Summer (DST): UTC-4 (EDT)
- ZIP code(s): 48632 (Lake); 48893, 49305
- Area code: 989
- FIPS code: 26-17060
- GNIS feature ID: 1626109

Coldwater Township is a civil township of Isabella County in the U.S. state of Michigan. The population was 801 at the 2020 census, making it the least-populated township in the county.

== Communities ==
- Brinton is an unincorporated community near the center of the township at 43°46′13″N 85°00′37″W It was settled in 1862 and first known as "Letson" after storekeeper Samuel A. Letson, who was also the first postmaster when the post office was established on April 20, 1886. It was renamed on April 17, 1888 for Oscar T. Brinton. The post office operated until November 30, 1906.

== Geography ==
According to the United States Census Bureau, the township has a total area of 36.0 square miles (93 km^{2}), of which 35.9 square miles (93 km^{2}) is land and 0.1 square miles (0.26 km^{2}) (0.22%) is water.

== Demographics ==
As of the census of 2000, there were 737 people, 277 households, and 222 families residing in the township. The population density was 20.5 inhabitants per square mile (7.9/km^{2}). There were 405 housing units at an average density of 11.3 per square mile (4.4/km^{2}). The racial makeup of the township was 95.79% White, 0.54% African American, 1.49% Native American, 0.41% Asian, 0.41% from other races, and 1.36% from two or more races. Hispanic or Latino of any race were 1.76% of the population.

There were 277 households, out of which 31.0% had children under the age of 18 living with them, 65.0% were married couples living together, 7.9% had a female householder with no husband present, and 19.5% were non-families. 16.2% of all households were made up of individuals, and 8.7% had someone living alone who was 65 years of age or older. The average household size was 2.66 and the average family size was 2.94.

In the township the population was spread out, with 25.0% under the age of 18, 6.8% from 18 to 24, 26.6% from 25 to 44, 25.9% from 45 to 64, and 15.7% who were 65 years of age or older. The median age was 40 years. For every 100 females, there were 107.0 males. For every 100 females age 18 and over, there were 107.9 males.

The median income for a household in the township was $34,853, and the median income for a family was $39,375. Males had a median income of $31,528 versus $23,523 for females. The per capita income for the township was $16,477. About 6.1% of families and 6.9% of the population were below the poverty line, including 8.9% of those under age 18 and 4.1% of those age 65 or over.

== Politics ==
United States presidential election results for Coldwater Township, Michigan
Year	Republican		Democratic		Third party(ies)	
Year	No.	%	No.	%	No.	%
2024	301	67.19%	141	31.47%	6	1.34%
2020	270	65.38%	137	33.17%	6	1.45%
2016	191	59.69%	111	34.69%	18	5.63%
2012	144	43.50%	184	55.59%	3	0.91%
2008	163	44.78%	193	53.02%	8	2.20%
2004	169	47.61%	183	51.55%	3	0.85%
2000	138	46.15%	153	51.17%	8	2.68%

United States Senate election results for Coldwater TownshipSenate 1
Year	Republican		Democratic		Third party(ies)	
Year	No.	%	No.	%	No.	%
2024	289	65.53%	140	31.75%	12	2.72%
2018	157	56.07%	116	41.43%	7	2.50%
2012	97	29.85%	211	64.92%	17	5.23%
2006	119	36.28%	201	61.28%	8	2.44%
2000	143	47.51%	148	49.17%	10	3.32%

United States Senate election results for Coldwater TownshipSenate 2 Michigan
Year	Republican		Democratic		Third party(ies)	
Year	No.	%	No.	%	No.	%
2020	277	67.40%	128	31.14%	6	1.46%
2014	95	39.75%	133	55.65%	11	4.60%
2008	125	35.31%	222	62.71%	7	1.98%
2002	77	32.08%	159	66.25%	4	1.67%

Gubernatorial election results for Coldwater Township
Year	Republican		Democratic		Third party(ies)	
Year	No.	%	No.	%	No.	%
2022	198	56.90%	138	39.66%	12	3.45%
2018	157	56.68%	111	40.07%	9	3.25%
2014	122	50.21%	113	46.50%	8	3.29%
2010	147	60.00%	92	37.55%	6	2.45%
2006	127	38.72%	196	59.76%	5	1.52%
2002	132	55.00%	103	42.92%	5	2.08%
1998	139	59.15%	96	40.85%	0	0.00%
