= Vernon Township, Isabella County, Michigan =

Vernon Township, Michigan
- Civil township
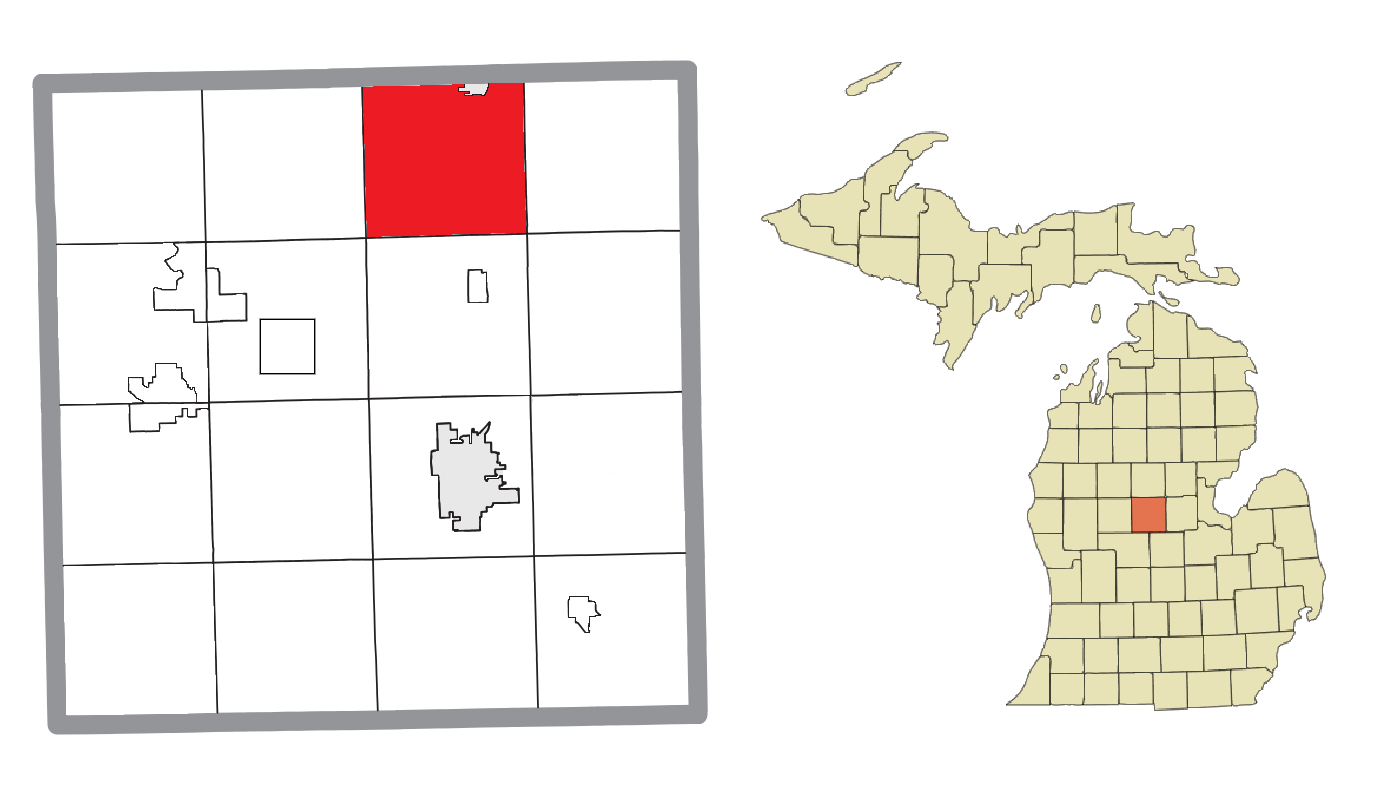
- Location within Isabella County

- Location within the state of Michigan Vernon Township (the United States)
- Coordinates: 43°45′54″N 84°46′59″W
- Country: United States
- State: Michigan
- County: Isabella

Area
  - Total: 35.7 sq mi (92.4 km^{2})
  - Land: 35.4 sq mi (91.8 km^{2})
  - Water: 0.23 sq mi (0.6 km^{2})
- Elevation: 850 ft (260 m)

Population (2020)
  - Total: 1,300
  - Density: 37/sq mi (14/km^{2})
- Time zone: UTC-5 (Eastern (EST))
  - Summer (DST): UTC-4 (EDT)
- ZIP code(s): 48617, 48622, 48878
- Area code: 989
- FIPS code: 26-82000
- GNIS feature ID: 1627195
- Website: Official website

Vernon Township is a civil township of Isabella County in the U.S. state of Michigan. The population was 1,300 based on the 2020 census.

== Communities ==
- The city of Clare is to the north of, mostly within, Clare County, although the city has incorporated some land within Vernon Township. The Clare post office, with ZIP code 48617, also serves a large portion of Vernon Township.
- Ellaville was the name of a post office in this township from 1878 to 1879.
- Vernon City is a mostly historical locale within the township at 43°48′52″N 84°46′20″W on the Little Tobacco Creek on the county line overlooking the city of Clare. Vernon City was platted in 1870 by John L. Markey.
- Vernon Center is an unincorporated locale in the township and the location of the township hall at 43°45′25″N 84°46′02″W

== Geography ==
According to the United States Census Bureau, the township has a total area of 35.7 square miles (92.4 km^{2}), of which 35.4 square miles (91.8 km^{2}) is land and 0.2 square mile (0.6 km^{2}) (0.70%) is water.

== Demographics ==
As of the census of 2000, there were 1,342 people, 488 households, and 380 families residing in the township. The population density was 37.9 inhabitants per square mile (14.6/km^{2}). There were 573 housing units at an average density of 16.2 per square mile (6.2/km^{2}). The racial makeup of the township was 97.47% White, 0.37% African American, 0.60% Native American, 0.15% Asian, 0.15% from other races, and 1.27% from two or more races. Hispanic or Latino of any race were 3.35% of the population.

There were 488 households, out of which 35.7% had children under the age of 18 living with them, 65.2% were married couples living together, 7.6% had a female householder with no husband present, and 22.1% were non-families. 17.6% of all households were made up of individuals, and 7.0% had someone living alone who was 65 years of age or older. The average household size was 2.68 and the average family size was 3.04.

In the township the population was spread out, with 26.0% under the age of 18, 7.7% from 18 to 24, 26.7% from 25 to 44, 27.0% from 45 to 64, and 12.5% who were 65 years of age or older. The median age was 38 years. For every 100 females, there were 105.5 males. For every 100 females age 18 and over, there were 103.5 males.

The median income for a household in the township was $43,594, and the median income for a family was $46,793. Males had a median income of $31,205 versus $24,013 for females. The per capita income for the township was $18,291. About 6.6% of families and 8.0% of the population were below the poverty line, including 12.2% of those under age 18 and 3.7% of those age 65 or over.
