= Isabella County, Michigan =

County in Michigan, United States

- County
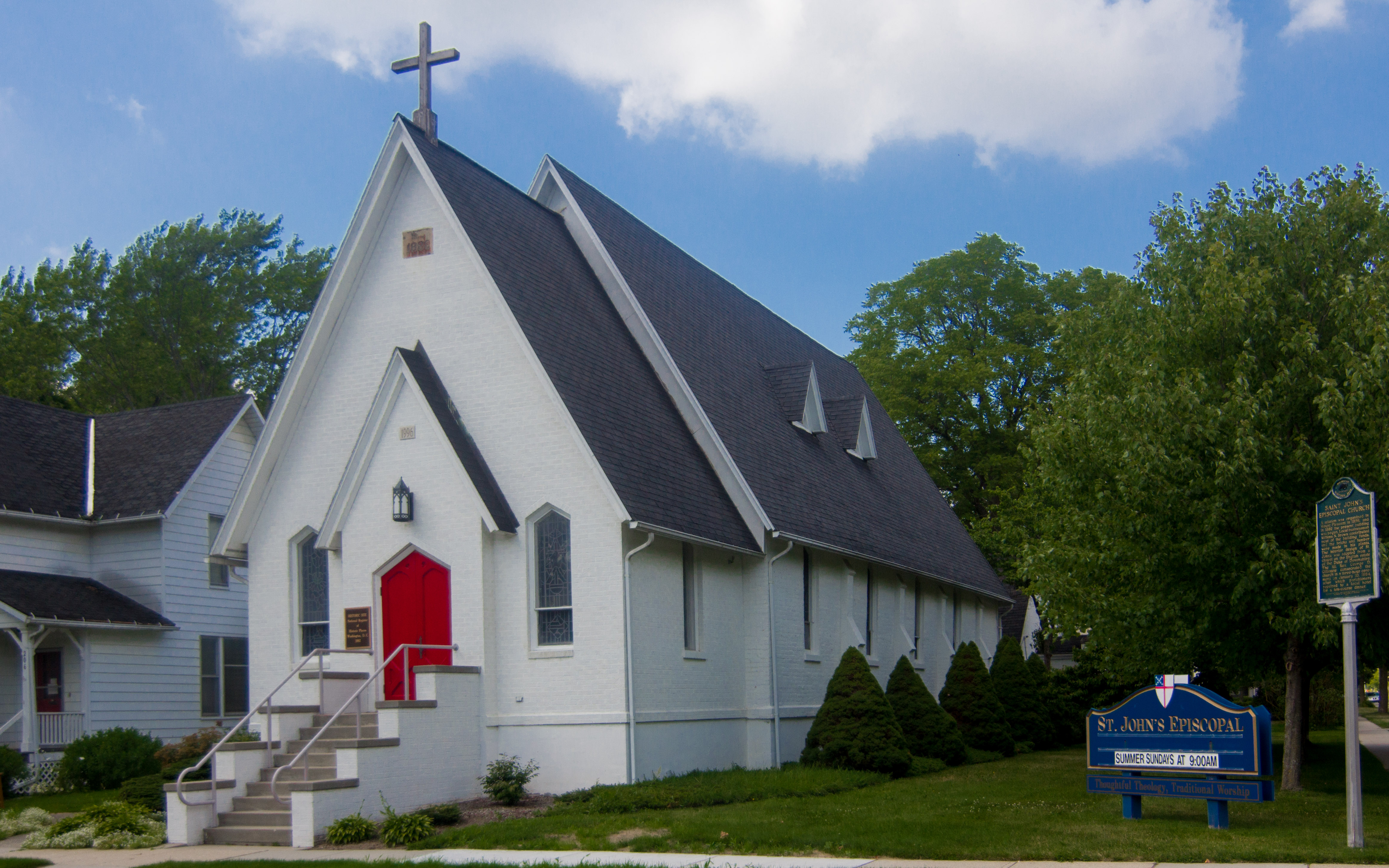
- St. John's Episcopal Church in Mount Pleasant

- Flag Seal

- Location within the U.S. state of Michigan
- Coordinates: 43°39′N 84°50′W
- Country: United States
- State: Michigan
- Created: 1831
- Organized: 1859
- Named for: Queen Isabella I of Castile
- Seat: Mount Pleasant
- Largest city: Mount Pleasant

Area
  - Total: 578 sq mi (1,500 km^{2})
  - Land: 573 sq mi (1,480 km^{2})
  - Water: 5.0 sq mi (13 km^{2}) 0.9%

Population (2020)
  - Total: 64,394
  - Estimate (2025): 64,691 ▲
  - Density: 124/sq mi (48/km^{2})
- Time zone: UTC−5 (Eastern)
  - Summer (DST): UTC−4 (EDT)
- Congressional district: 2nd
- Website: www.isabellacounty.org

Isabella County is a county located in the U.S. state of Michigan. As of the 2020 Census, the population was 64,394. Its county seat is Mount Pleasant. The area was known as Ojibiway Besse, meaning "the place of the Ojibwa". Isabella County contains the Isabella Indian Reservation, on which members of the Saginaw Chippewa Tribal Nation live. The county is home to Central Michigan University.

== History ==
Isabella County was described by action of the Michigan Territory legislature in 1831, but for purposes of population, revenue, and judicial matters, it was assigned to nearby counties. Its area was partitioned from unorganized territory plus a portion of Mackinac, which had existed as a Territorial County since 1818.

The Michigan Territory was admitted to the Union as Michigan state in early 1837. By 1859, Isabella had sufficient settlement and interest in self-government that the state legislature authorized its organization. Based on a suggestion by Henry Rowe Schoolcraft, the U.S. Indian agent in this area, the county was named after Queen Isabella I of Castile, who with her husband Ferdinand commissioned Columbus's expedition to the New World.

Isabella County comprises the Mount Pleasant, Michigan micropolitan statistical area in Mid-Michigan. The county contains the Isabella Indian Reservation, which has a total area of 217.67 square miles (563.8 km^{2}). It is the major land base of the federally recognized Saginaw Chippewa Tribal Nation. Part of the county seat of Mount Pleasant is located within the reservation.

== Geography ==
According to the US Census Bureau, the county has a total area of 578 square miles (1,500 km^{2}), of which 573 square miles (1,480 km^{2}) are land and 5.0 square miles (13 km^{2}) (0.9%) are water.

=== Highways ===
- US 10 – cuts across NE corner of county. Enters at Clare; runs ESE to east county line. Exits to Coleman.
- US 127 – runs north–south through the eastern central part of county. Passes Rosebush and Mt. Pleasant, runs SE to Shepherd, then runs south into Gratiot County.
- M-20 – runs east–west across lower central part of county. Enters from Remus. Ends at Mt. Pleasant.
- (proposed) – I-73 - project in Michigan is inactive

=== Adjacent counties ===
- Clare County – north
- Gladwin County – northeast
- Midland County – east
- Gratiot County – southeast
- Montcalm County – southwest
- Mecosta County – west
- Osceola County – northwest

== Demographics ==
Historical population
Census	Pop.	Note	%±
1860	1,443		—
1870	4,113		185.0%
1880	12,159		195.6%
1890	18,784		54.5%
1900	22,784		21.3%
1910	23,029		1.1%
1920	22,610		−1.8%
1930	21,126		−6.6%
1940	25,982		23.0%
1950	28,964		11.5%
1960	35,348		22.0%
1970	44,594		26.2%
1980	54,110		21.3%
1990	54,624		0.9%
2000	63,351		16.0%
2010	70,311		11.0%
2020	64,394		−8.4%
2025 (est.)	64,691	▲	0.5%
US Decennial Census; 1790-1960 1900-1990; 1990-2000 2010-2018

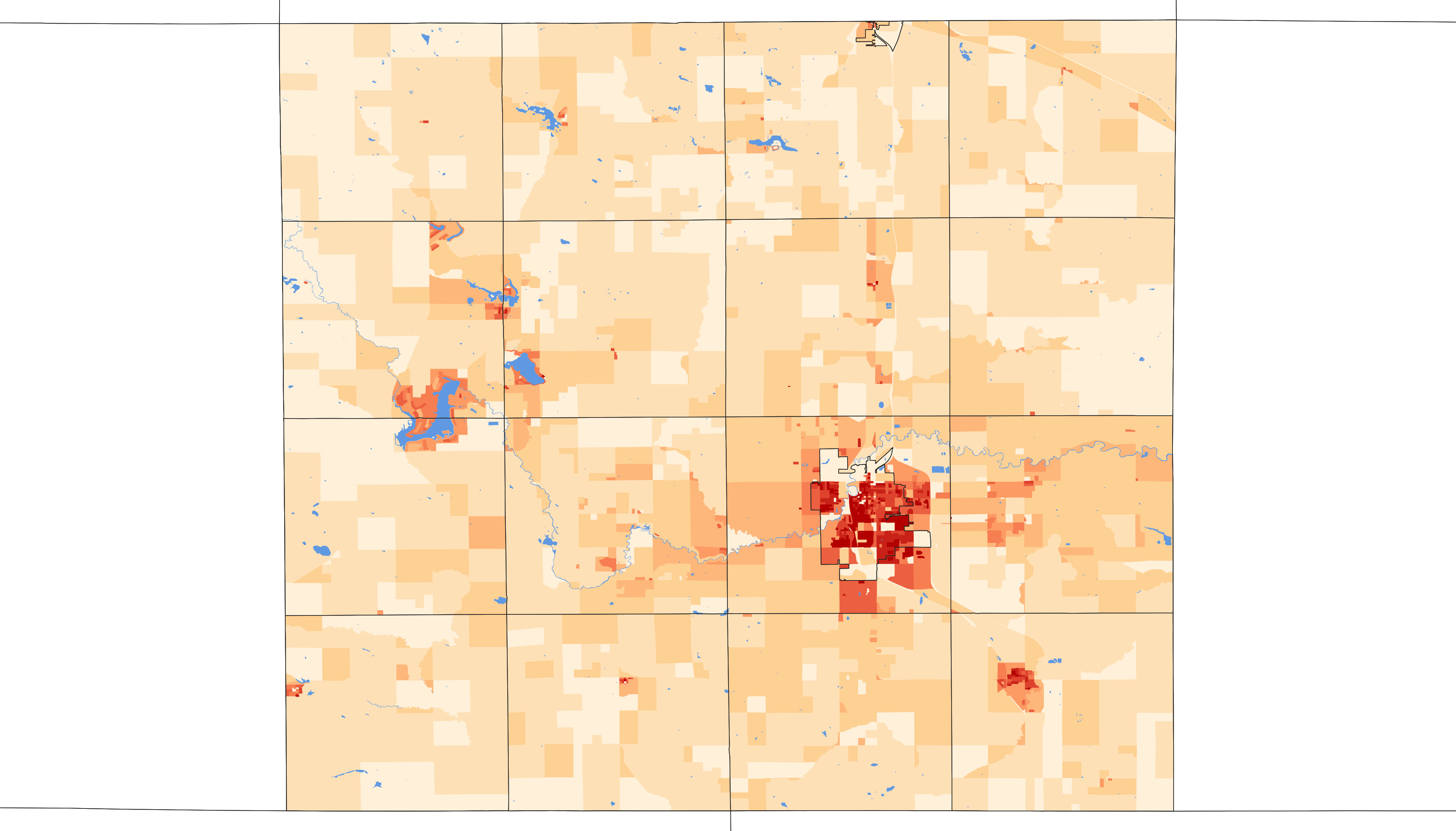
2020 population density of Isabella County MI by census block

=== Racial and ethnic composition ===
Isabella County, Michigan – Racial and ethnic composition Note: the US Census treats Hispanic/Latino as an ethnic category. This table excludes Latinos from the racial categories and assigns them to a separate category. Hispanics/Latinos may be of any race.
Race / Ethnicity (NH = Non-Hispanic)	Pop 1980	Pop 1990	Pop 2000	Pop 2010	Pop 2020	% 1980	% 1990	% 2000	% 2010	% 2020
White alone (NH)	51,974	51,814	57,294	61,514	52,970	96.05%	94.86%	90.44%	87.49%	82.26%
Black or African American alone (NH)	480	628	1,211	1,643	2,076	0.89%	1.15%	1.91%	2.34%	3.22%
Native American or Alaska Native alone (NH)	681	977	1,609	2,161	2,025	1.26%	1.79%	2.54%	3.07%	3.14%
Asian alone (NH)	163	451	877	1,141	1,116	0.30%	0.83%	1.38%	1.62%	1.73%
Native Hawaiian or Pacific Islander alone (NH)	x	x	20	14	17	x	x	0.03%	0.02%	0.03%
Other race alone (NH)	150	40	63	40	182	0.28%	0.07%	0.10%	0.06%	0.28%
Mixed race or Multiracial (NH)	x	x	858	1,601	3,002	x	x	1.35%	2.28%	4.66%
Hispanic or Latino (any race)	662	714	1,419	2,197	3,006	1.22%	1.31%	2.24%	3.12%	4.67%
Total	54,110	54,624	63,351	70,311	64,394	100.00%	100.00%	100.00%	100.00%	100.00%

=== 2020 census ===
As of the 2020 census, the county had a population of 64,394. The median age was 31.7 years. 19.2% of residents were under the age of 18 and 14.8% of residents were 65 years of age or older. For every 100 females there were 95.7 males, and for every 100 females age 18 and over there were 93.4 males.

The racial makeup of the county was 84.1% White, 3.3% Black or African American, 3.5% American Indian and Alaska Native, 1.7% Asian, <0.1% Native Hawaiian and Pacific Islander, 1.2% from some other race, and 6.1% from two or more races. Hispanic or Latino residents of any race comprised 4.7% of the population.

47.7% of residents lived in urban areas, while 52.3% lived in rural areas.

There were 25,191 households in the county, of which 26.2% had children under the age of 18 living in them. Of all households, 40.0% were married-couple households, 23.1% were households with a male householder and no spouse or partner present, and 28.2% were households with a female householder and no spouse or partner present. About 30.6% of all households were made up of individuals and 9.9% had someone living alone who was 65 years of age or older.

There were 28,489 housing units, of which 11.6% were vacant. Among occupied housing units, 60.1% were owner-occupied and 39.9% were renter-occupied. The homeowner vacancy rate was 1.5% and the rental vacancy rate was 10.0%.

=== 2000 census ===
As of the 2000 United States census, there were 63,351 people, 22,425 households, and 13,006 families residing in the county. The population density was 110 people per square mile (42 people/km^{2}). There were 24,528 housing units at an average density of 43 per square mile (17/km^{2}). The racial makeup of the county was 91.51% White, 2.75% Native American, 1.93% Black or African American, 1.40% Asian, 0.05% Pacific Islander, 0.68% from other races, and 1.68% from two or more races. 2.24% of the population were Hispanic or Latino of any race. 28.0% were of German, 10.1% English, 10.0% Irish, 7.5% American and 6.0% Polish ancestry, 95.9% spoke English and 1.6% Spanish as their first language.

There were 22,425 households, out of which 28.40% had children under the age of 18 living with them, 45.40% were married couples living together, 8.90% had a female householder with no husband present, and 42.00% were non-families. 23.80% of all households were made up of individuals, and 7.30% had someone living alone who was 65 years of age or older. The average household size was 2.55 and the average family size was 3.03.

The county population contained 20.30% under the age of 18, 29.40% from 18 to 24, 23.80% from 25 to 44, 17.40% from 45 to 64, and 9.00% who were 65 years of age or older. The median age was 25 years. For every 100 females there were 91.40 males. For every 100 females age 18 and over, there were 88.60 males.

The median income for a household in the county was $34,262, and the median income for a family was $45,953. Males had a median income of $32,270 versus $24,180 for females. The per capita income for the county was $16,242. 7.40% of families and 20.40% of the population were below the poverty line, including 11.30% of those under age 18 and 7.80% of those age 65 or over.

== Government ==
United States presidential election results for Isabella County, Michigan
Year	Republican		Democratic		Third party(ies)	
Year	No.	%	No.	%	No.	%
1884	1,617	48.78%	1,610	48.57%	88	2.65%
1888	2,154	51.46%	1,841	43.98%	191	4.56%
1892	1,859	45.42%	1,762	43.05%	472	11.53%
1896	2,424	46.71%	2,679	51.63%	86	1.66%
1900	2,969	58.64%	1,996	39.42%	98	1.94%
1904	3,547	70.97%	1,321	26.43%	130	2.60%
1908	3,171	63.18%	1,658	33.03%	190	3.79%
1912	1,417	29.71%	1,389	29.13%	1,963	41.16%
1916	2,700	53.91%	2,143	42.79%	165	3.29%
1920	5,089	73.82%	1,627	23.60%	178	2.58%
1924	5,245	77.08%	1,208	17.75%	352	5.17%
1928	4,926	73.13%	1,762	26.16%	48	0.71%
1932	4,211	48.71%	4,272	49.42%	162	1.87%
1936	4,051	46.79%	3,871	44.71%	736	8.50%
1940	7,019	70.96%	2,828	28.59%	44	0.44%
1944	6,356	71.02%	2,522	28.18%	71	0.79%
1948	5,485	67.23%	2,487	30.49%	186	2.28%
1952	8,222	73.54%	2,881	25.77%	77	0.69%
1956	8,415	72.41%	3,183	27.39%	23	0.20%
1960	7,880	63.88%	4,431	35.92%	24	0.19%
1964	4,672	39.84%	7,040	60.03%	15	0.13%
1968	7,111	57.37%	4,450	35.90%	835	6.74%
1972	9,682	55.47%	7,446	42.66%	326	1.87%
1976	10,577	57.66%	7,281	39.69%	487	2.65%
1980	10,407	50.24%	7,293	35.21%	3,015	14.55%
1984	12,215	65.00%	6,435	34.24%	143	0.76%
1988	10,362	56.07%	7,960	43.07%	160	0.87%
1992	7,706	34.97%	8,784	39.86%	5,547	25.17%
1996	7,460	38.57%	9,635	49.81%	2,247	11.62%
2000	10,053	47.71%	10,228	48.55%	788	3.74%
2004	11,754	48.19%	12,334	50.57%	302	1.24%
2008	11,220	39.49%	16,679	58.71%	511	1.80%
2012	10,800	44.52%	13,038	53.74%	422	1.74%
2016	12,338	48.31%	11,404	44.65%	1,798	7.04%
2020	14,815	50.26%	14,072	47.74%	589	2.00%
2024	16,320	52.93%	14,011	45.44%	504	1.63%

United States Senate election results for Isabella County, Michigan1
Year	Republican		Democratic		Third party(ies)	
Year	No.	%	No.	%	No.	%
2024	15,569	51.46%	13,728	45.37%	959	3.17%

Michigan Gubernatorial election results for Isabella County
Year	Republican		Democratic		Third party(ies)	
Year	No.	%	No.	%	No.	%
2022	10,927	45.61%	12,581	52.51%	449	1.87%

The county government operates the jail, maintains rural roads, operates the major local courts, records deeds, mortgages, and vital records, administers public health regulations, and participates with the state in the provision of social services. The county board of commissioners controls the budget and has limited authority to make laws or ordinances. In Michigan, most local government functions — police and fire, building and zoning, tax assessment, street maintenance, etc. — are the responsibility of individual cities and townships.

=== Elected officials ===
- Prosecuting Attorney: Mark Kowalczyk
- Sheriff: Michael Main
- County Clerk: Minde B. Lux
- Register of Deeds: Karen Jackson
- County Treasurer: Steven W. Pickens
- Drain Commissioner: Robert “Buford” Willoughby

== Communities ==
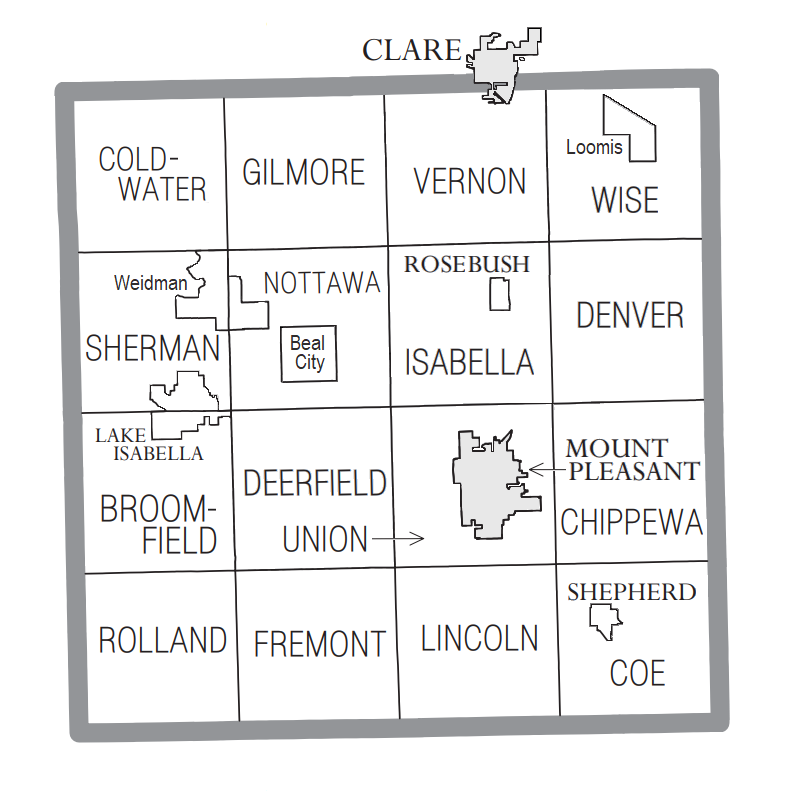
U.S. Census data map showing local municipal boundaries within Isabella County, as well as CDP boundaries. Shaded areas represent incorporated cities.

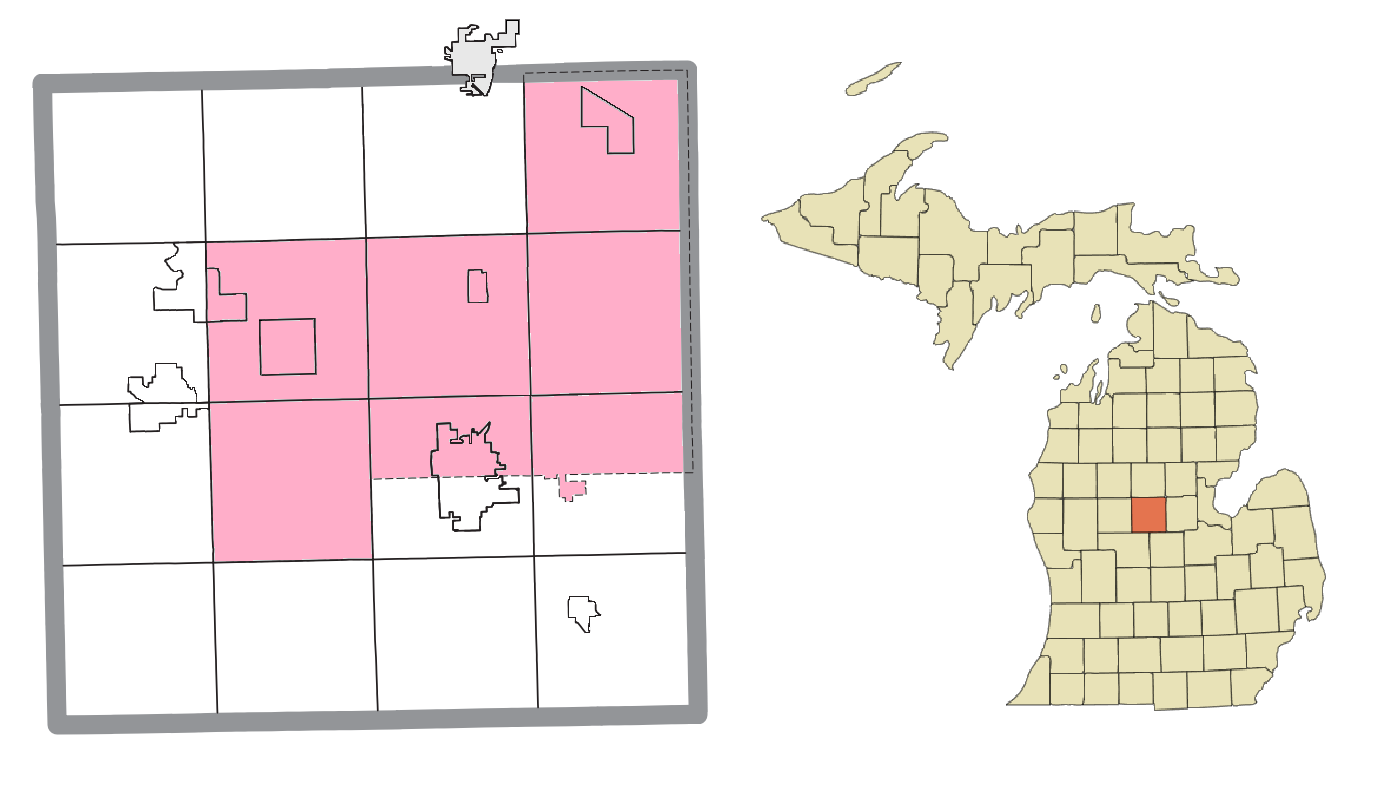
Isabella Indian Reservation with underlying local boundaries

=== Cities ===
- Clare (part)
- Mount Pleasant (county seat)

=== Villages ===
- Lake Isabella
- Rosebush
- Shepherd

=== Charter township ===
- Union Charter Township

=== Civil townships ===
- Broomfield Township
- Chippewa Township
- Coe Township
- Coldwater Township
- Deerfield Township
- Denver Township
- Fremont Township
- Gilmore Township
- Isabella Township
- Lincoln Township
- Nottawa Township
- Rolland Township
- Sherman Township
- Vernon Township
- Wise Township

=== Census-designated places ===
- Beal City
- Loomis
- Weidman
- Winn

=== Unincorporated communities ===
- Alembic
- Blanchard
- Brinton
- Coe
- Delwin
- Leaton
- Sherman City
- Two Rivers
- Vernon Center
- Vernon City

=== Indian reservation ===
- Isabella Indian Reservation

== Education ==
The Gratiot–Isabella Regional Education Service District, based in Ithaca, services the students in the county. The intermediate school district offers regional special education services, early education programs, and technical career pathways for students of its districts.

Isabella County is served by the following regular public school districts:

- Beal City Public Schools
- Mount Pleasant Public Schools
- Shepherd Public Schools

The county also has the following independent charter districts:

- Flextech High School - Shepherd
- Renaissance Public School Academy

Isabella County has the following private schools:

- Sacred Heart Academy (Roman Catholic)
- Saginaw Chippewa Academy (Nonsectarian)
- St. Joseph the Worker School (Roman Catholic)
- White Pine Montessori Children's Center (Montessori method)

== See also ==
- List of Michigan State Historic Sites in Isabella County
- National Register of Historic Places listings in Isabella County, Michigan
