= Gilmore Township, Isabella County, Michigan =

Gilmore Township, Michigan
- Civil township
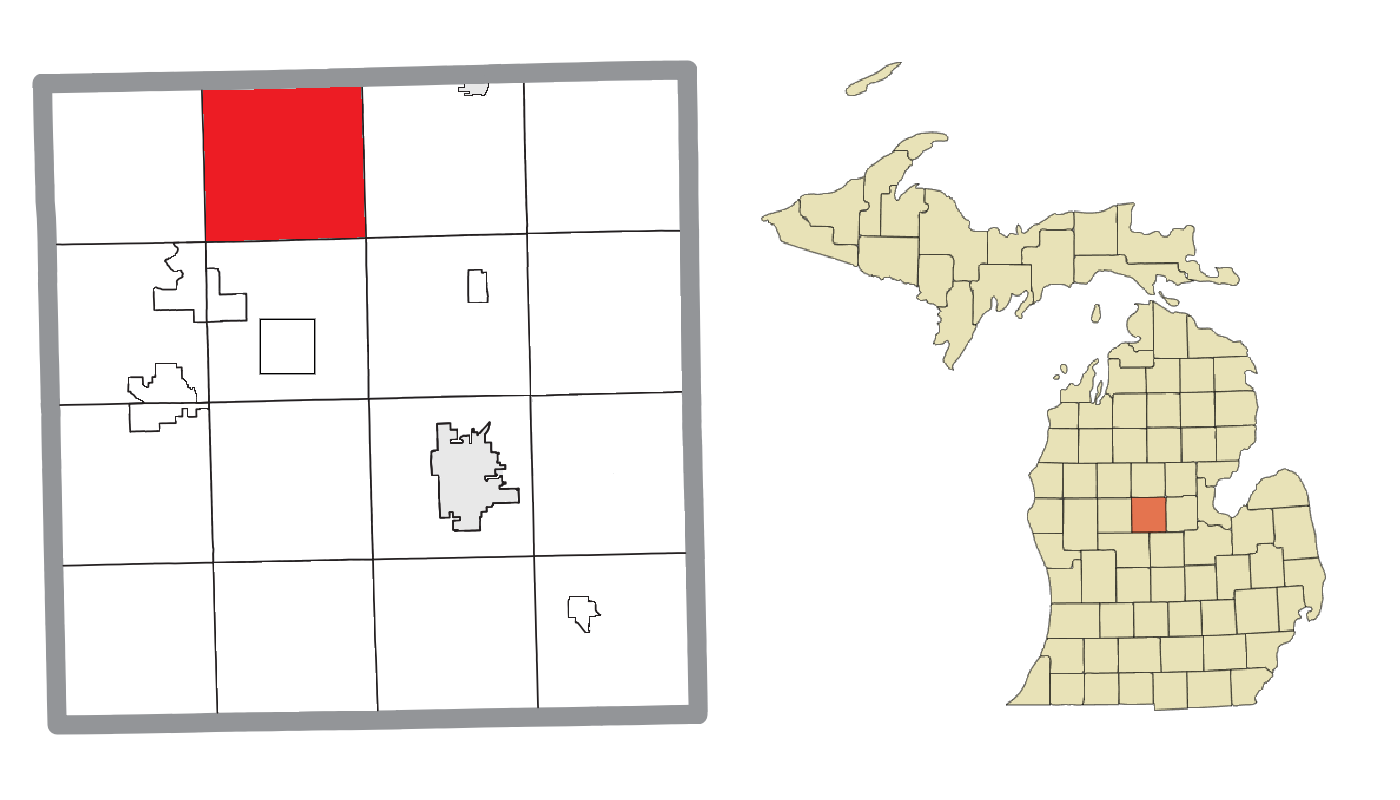
- Location within Isabella County

- Location within the state of Michigan Gilmore Township (the United States)
- Coordinates: 43°46′30″N 84°54′39″W
- Country: United States
- State: Michigan
- County: Isabella

Area
  - Total: 36.1 sq mi (93.4 km^{2})
  - Land: 35.8 sq mi (92.6 km^{2})
  - Water: 0.35 sq mi (0.9 km^{2})
- Elevation: 925 ft (282 m)

Population (2020)
  - Total: 1,314
  - Density: 36.8/sq mi (14.2/km^{2})
- Time zone: UTC-5 (Eastern (EST))
  - Summer (DST): UTC-4 (EDT)
- ZIP code(s): 48622, 48632 (Lake), 48878, 48893
- Area code: 989
- FIPS code: 26-32200
- GNIS feature ID: 1626354
- Website: https://gilmoretwp.com/

Gilmore Township is a civil township of Isabella County in the U.S. state of Michigan. The population was 1,314 at the 2020 census.

== History ==
Gilmore Township was organized in 1870.

== Geography ==
According to the United States Census Bureau, the township has a total area of 36.1 square miles (93 km^{2}), of which 35.7 square miles (92 km^{2}) is land and 0.3 square miles (0.78 km^{2}) (0.94%) is water.

== Demographics ==
As of the census of 2000, there were 1,376 people, 511 households, and 400 families residing in the township. The population density was 38.5 inhabitants per square mile (14.9/km^{2}). There were 742 housing units at an average density of 20.8 per square mile (8.0/km^{2}). The racial makeup of the township was 96.37% White, 0.07% African American, 1.45% Native American, 0.15% Asian, 1.16% from other races, and 0.80% from two or more races. Hispanic or Latino of any race were 3.63% of the population.

There were 511 households, out of which 29.4% had children under the age of 18 living with them, 68.5% were married couples living together, 6.3% had a female householder with no husband present, and 21.7% were non-families. 16.0% of all households were made up of individuals, and 6.3% had someone living alone who was 65 years of age or older. The average household size was 2.66 and the average family size was 2.91.

In the township the population was spread out, with 24.3% under the age of 18, 6.5% from 18 to 24, 28.1% from 25 to 44, 27.0% from 45 to 64, and 14.1% who were 65 years of age or older. The median age was 40 years. For every 100 females, there were 100.0 males. For every 100 females age 18 and over, there were 94.2 males.

The median income for a household in the township was $37,000, and the median income for a family was $39,911. Males had a median income of $30,179 versus $23,194 for females. The per capita income for the township was $16,277. About 6.6% of families and 9.9% of the population were below the poverty line, including 13.4% of those under age 18 and 7.6% of those age 65 or over.

== Politics ==
United States presidential election results for Gilmore Township, Michigan
Year	Republican		Democratic		Third party(ies)	
Year	No.	%	No.	%	No.	%
2024	573	69.96%	233	28.45%	13	1.59%
2020	539	67.54%	247	30.95%	12	1.50%
2016	415	62.50%	219	32.98%	30	4.52%
2012	325	50.00%	322	49.54%	3	0.46%
2008	318	44.85%	376	53.03%	15	2.12%
2004	332	46.96%	364	51.49%	11	1.56%
2000	271	44.07%	319	51.87%	25	4.07%

United States Senate election results for Gimore TownshipSenate 1
Year	Republican		Democratic		Third party(ies)	
Year	No.	%	No.	%	No.	%
2024	548	68.24%	226	28.14%	29	3.61%
2018	358	58.88%	237	38.98%	13	2.14%
2012	256	39.57%	371	57.34%	20	3.09%
2006	228	39.65%	333	57.91%	14	2.43%
2000	299	48.54%	293	47.56%	24	3.90%

United States Senate election results for Gilmore TownshipSenate 2 Michigan
Year	Republican		Democratic		Third party(ies)	
Year	No.	%	No.	%	No.	%
2020	529	66.46%	247	31.03%	20	2.51%
2014	196	41.88%	242	51.71%	30	6.41%
2008	241	34.73%	426	61.38%	27	3.89%
2002	160	32.26%	325	65.52%	11	2.22%

Gubernatorial election results for Gilmore Township
Year	Republican		Democratic		Third party(ies)	
Year	No.	%	No.	%	No.	%
2022	431	65.01%	219	33.03%	13	1.96%
2018	353	57.96%	232	38.10%	24	3.94%
2014	239	50.96%	213	45.42%	17	3.62%
2010	299	65.28%	141	30.79%	18	3.93%
2006	251	43.35%	319	55.09%	9	1.55%
2002	239	47.33%	256	50.69%	10	1.98%
1998	272	59.00%	189	41.00%	0	0.00%
