= Union Charter Township, Michigan =

- Charter township
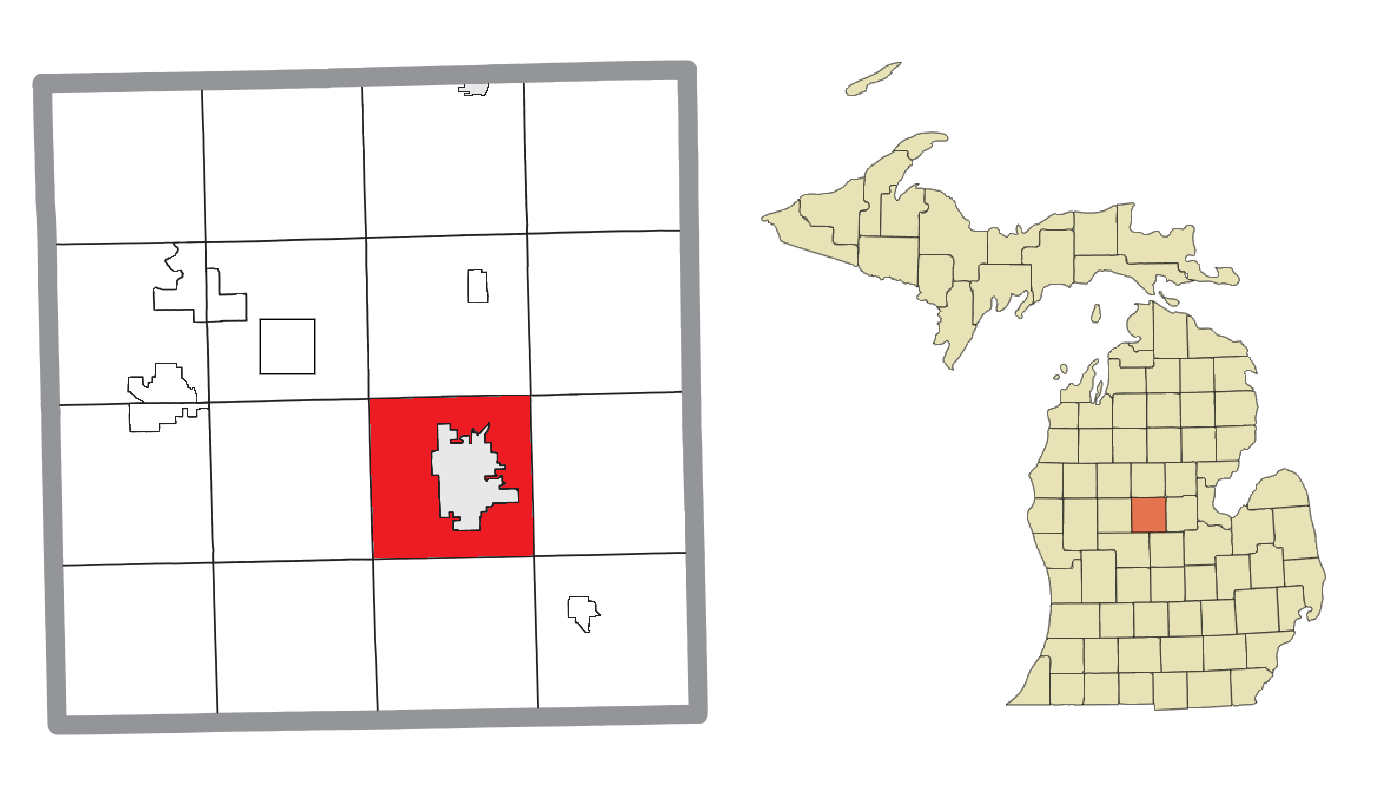
- Location within Isabella County

- Location within the state of Michigan
- Coordinates: 43°35′48″N 84°45′37″W
- Country: United States
- State: Michigan
- County: Isabella

Area
  - Total: 28.6 sq mi (74.1 km^{2})
  - Land: 28.5 sq mi (73.8 km^{2})
  - Water: 0.12 sq mi (0.3 km^{2})
- Elevation: 771 ft (235 m)

Population (2020)
  - Total: 11,699
  - Density: 411/sq mi (159/km^{2})
- Time zone: UTC-5 (Eastern (EST))
  - Summer (DST): UTC-4 (EDT)
- ZIP code(s): 48858
- Area code: 989
- FIPS code: 26-81340
- GNIS feature ID: 1627186
- Website: https://www.uniontownshipmi.com/

Union Charter Township is a charter township of Isabella County in the U.S. state of Michigan. The population was 12,927 at the 2010 census, and decreased to 11,699 at the 2020 census. The city of Mount Pleasant is entirely surrounded by the township on incorporated land that was formerly part of the township, but the two are administratively separate.

== Communities ==
- Mount Pleasant was a former community of Union Charter Township that has since been incorporated into a city and is now administered separately from the township. Though separate, it is the only remaining community in existence from within the township.

=== Former Communities ===
- Isabella City was the first community established in the township. It was located at E. River Road and S. Mission Road (formerly U.S. Highway 27). It was located on the north side of the Chippewa River, and its streets ran parallel and perpendicular to the river. Main Street and Fitch Street, now Craig Hill Road and E. River Road respectively, are the last remaining streets of the town. Only the part west of S. Mission Road, which runs at odds with the community's platted streets, remains developed, while the rest of the city has been reclaimed by nature. Residents of the area now refer to the area as Dogtown, and the name Isabella City has been largely forgotten, though its plat is still recorded with the county records.
- Longwood was located between E. River Road and E. Airport Road (now Industrial Drive) off the east side of S. Mission Road (formerly U.S. Highway 27). This town was absorbed into the City of Mount Pleasant. Hardly any of its original buildings exist today.
- South Mount Pleasant existed off the north side of E. Deerfield Road between S. Crawford Road and S. Mission Road (formerly U.S. Highway 27). S. Washington Street use to extend from W. Broomfield Street to E. Deerfield Road and right at the intersection of Deerfield and Washington was where the town sat. Today the town has been turned into a biological wild life preserve for Central Michigan University, and no remnants of the town remain, though its plat is still recorded with the county records.

== History ==
The first settlers came to Union Township in 1854 when pioneer John Hursh and his family arrived in the area. Various settlements in the 36 square miles (93 km^{2}) of the original township have long disappeared or been absorbed by the City of Mount Pleasant that lies in the center of Union Township. The Charter Township of Union traces its name to the Civil War. A month before the first shots of war rang out at Fort Sumter, the Board of Supervisors formally established Union Township on March 9, 1861.

== Geography ==
According to the United States Census Bureau, the township has a total area of 28.6 square miles (74 km^{2}), of which 28.5 square miles (74 km^{2}) is land and 0.1 square miles (0.26 km^{2}) (0.42%) is water.

== Demographics ==
As of the census of 2000, there were 7,615 people, 2,961 households, and 1,619 families residing in the township. The population density was 267.4 inhabitants per square mile (103.2/km^{2}). There were 3,179 housing units at an average density of 111.6 per square mile (43.1/km^{2}). The racial makeup of the township was 90.61% White, 1.81% African American, 3.82% Native American, 1.05% Asian, 0.67% from other races, and 2.04% from two or more races. Hispanic or Latino of any race were 2.36% of the population.

There were 2,961 households, out of which 28.0% had children under the age of 18 living with them, 40.7% were married couples living together, 10.2% had a female householder with no husband present, and 45.3% were non-families. 21.9% of all households were made up of individuals, and 4.8% had someone living alone who was 65 years of age or older. The average household size was 2.54 and the average family size was 3.03.

In the township the population was spread out, with 21.7% under the age of 18, 27.8% from 18 to 24, 25.6% from 25 to 44, 17.5% from 45 to 64, and 7.4% who were 65 years of age or older. The median age was 25 years. For every 100 females, there were 91.8 males. For every 100 females age 18 and over, there were 88.8 males.

The median income for a household in the township was $35,448, and the median income for a family was $48,381. Males had a median income of $32,361 versus $25,478 for females. The per capita income for the township was $18,248. About 6.0% of families and 19.2% of the population were below the poverty line, including 8.9% of those under age 18 and 7.2% of those age 65 or over.

== Current Officials ==
Township Manager: Mark Stuhldreher

Supervisor: Bryan Mielke

Clerk: Lisa Cody

Treasurer: Kimberly M. Rice

Trustees: James Thering Jr., Jeff Brown, Connie Lee Bills, and Bill Hauck.

== Facilities ==
Jameson Park is located on Budd Street. The nearest major intersection is Isabella Road and Pickard Road. Budd St is an "L" and is the first street east of Isabella Rd and the first street north of Pickard. There is a ball diamond, volleyball court and a playscape. The hall maybe rented and is also the voting location for precinct 2.

McDonald Park is located just west of the township hall, 2010 S Lincoln Road. This facility provides 4 baseball fields, 2 softball fields, 2 pavilions and supports several leagues and programs. All services are on first come basis unless reserved; league play is reserved. Other opportunities are playground equipment, outdoor ice rink, and restrooms.
