= Chippewa Township, Isabella County, Michigan =

Chippewa Township, Michigan
- Civil township
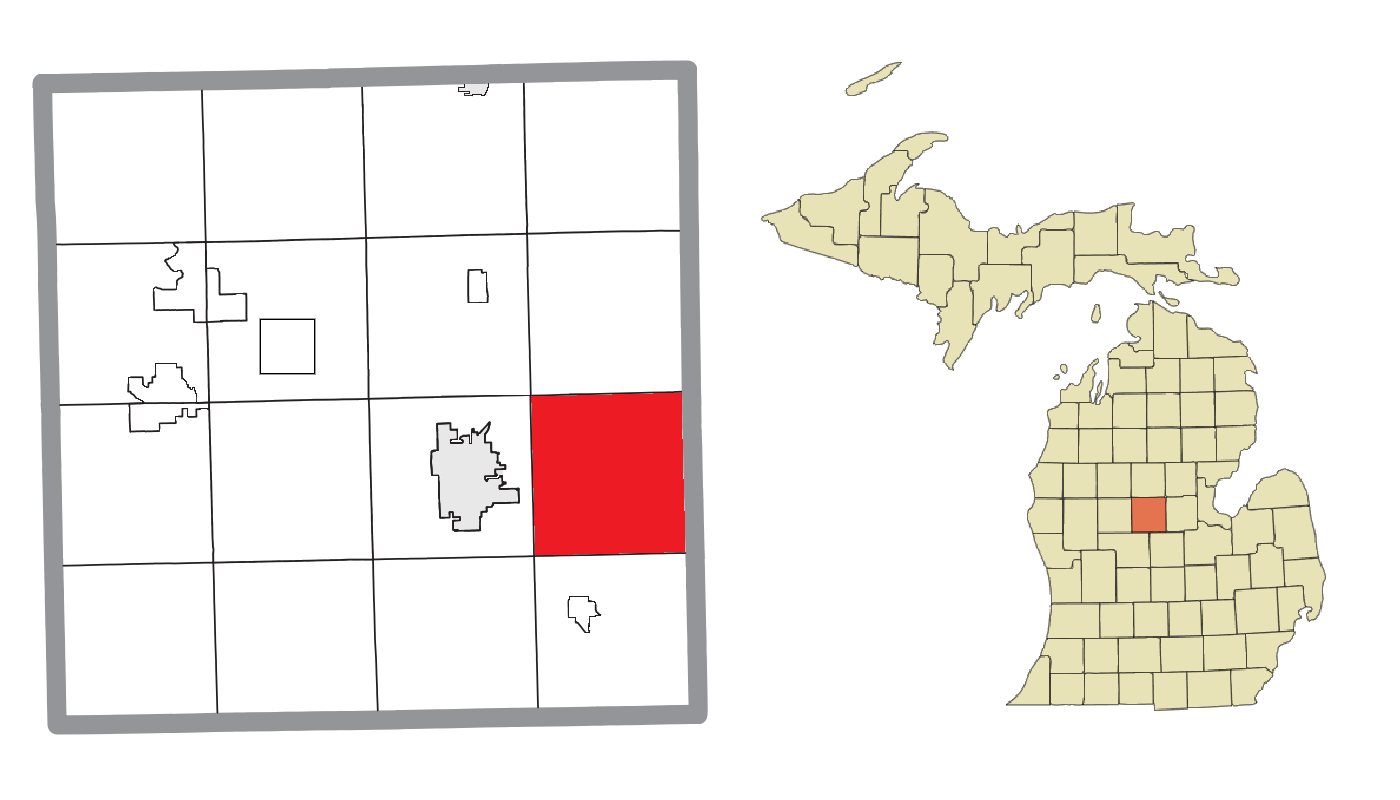
- Location within Isabella County

- Location within the state of Michigan Chippewa Township (the United States)
- Coordinates: 43°35′52″N 84°40′26″W
- Country: United States
- State: Michigan
- County: Isabella

Area
  - Total: 36.3 sq mi (94.0 km^{2})
  - Land: 36.2 sq mi (93.7 km^{2})
  - Water: 0.12 sq mi (0.3 km^{2})
- Elevation: 745 ft (227 m)

Population (2020)
  - Total: 4,446
  - Density: 123/sq mi (47.4/km^{2})
- Time zone: UTC-5 (Eastern (EST))
  - Summer (DST): UTC-4 (EDT)
- ZIP code(s): 48858, 48883
- Area code: 989
- FIPS code: 26-15580
- GNIS feature ID: 1626079
- Website: https://www.chippewatownship.com/

Chippewa Township is a civil township of Isabella County in the U.S. state of Michigan. As of the 2020 census, the township population was 4,446. The city of Mount Pleasant is nearby to the west, and the Mount Pleasant post office, with ZIP code 48858, also serves the northern portion of Chippewa Township.

== Communities ==
There are no incorporated municipalities within the township.

- The village of Shepherd is nearby to the south, and the Shepherd post office, with ZIP code 48883, also serves the southern portion of Chippewa Township.
- Alembic is a historic locale near the center of the township at 43°35′51″N 84°40′06″W A rural post office operated from June 23, 1874 until December 31, 1905.

== Demographics ==
As of the census of 2000, there were 4,617 people, 1,653 households, and 1,203 families residing in the township. The population density was 127.6 inhabitants per square mile (49.3/km^{2}). There were 1,744 housing units at an average density of 48.2 per square mile (18.6/km^{2}). The racial makeup of the township was 80.49% White, 0.61% African American, 14.81% Native American, 0.26% Asian, 0.11% Pacific Islander, 0.52% from other races, and 3.21% from two or more races. Hispanic or Latino of any race were 3.16% of the population.

There were 1,653 households, out of which 38.1% had children under the age of 18 living with them, 53.2% were married couples living together, 14.5% had a female householder with no husband present, and 27.2% were non-families. 20.4% of all households were made up of individuals, and 4.5% had someone living alone who was 65 years of age or older. The average household size was 2.78 and the average family size was 3.20.

In the township the population was spread out, with 29.9% under the age of 18, 10.2% from 18 to 24, 31.3% from 25 to 44, 21.1% from 45 to 64, and 7.5% who were 65 years of age or older. The median age was 32 years. For every 100 females, there were 100.5 males. For every 100 females age 18 and over, there were 98.5 males.

The median income for a household in the township was $35,676, and the median income for a family was $43,804. Males had a median income of $31,467 versus $24,344 for females. The per capita income for the township was $16,312. About 9.8% of families and 13.9% of the population were below the poverty line, including 14.6% of those under age 18 and 9.7% of those age 65 or over.
