= Deerfield Township, Isabella County, Michigan =

Deerfield Township, Michigan
- Civil township
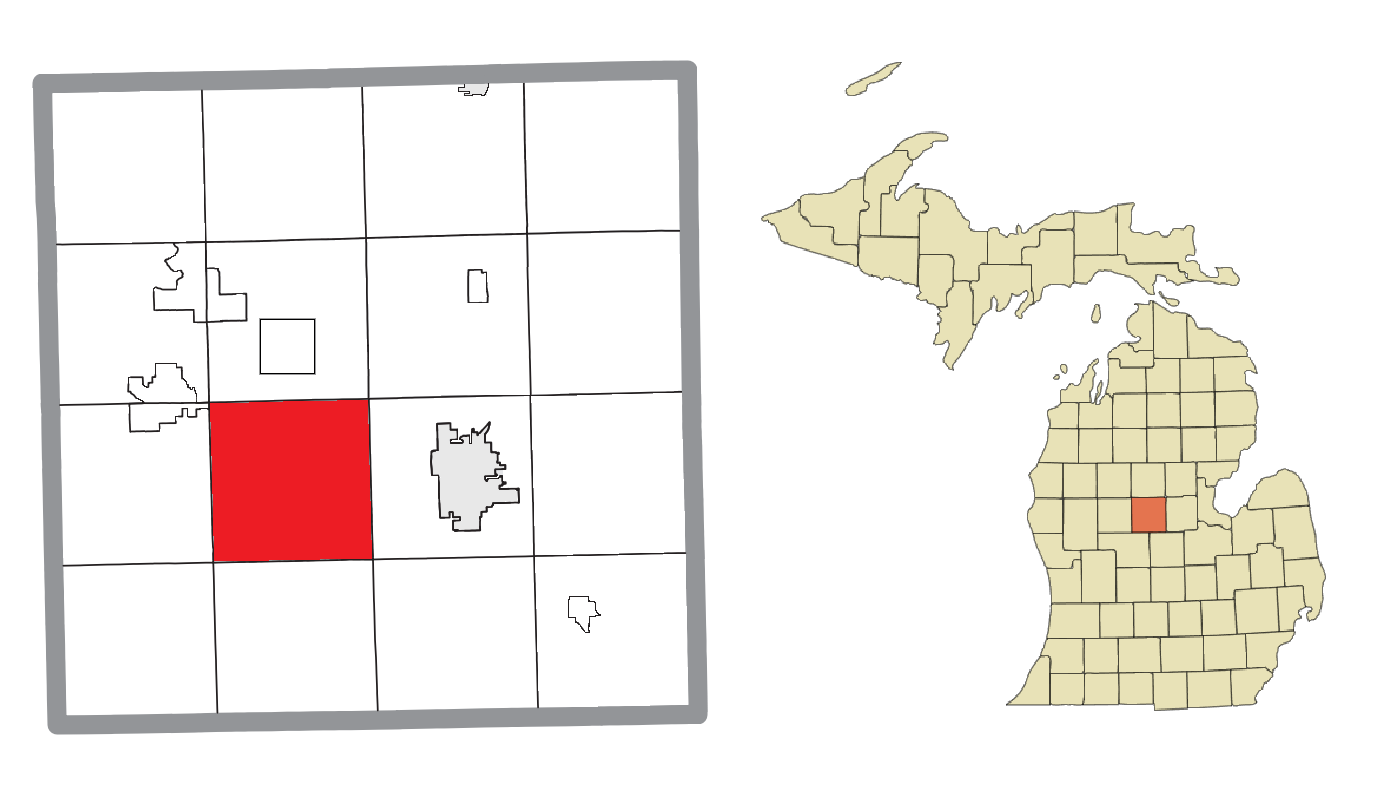
- Location within Isabella County

- Location within the state of Michigan Deerfield Township (the United States)
- Coordinates: 43°35′38″N 84°54′11″W
- Country: United States
- State: Michigan
- County: Isabella

Area
  - Total: 35.9 sq mi (92.9 km^{2})
  - Land: 35.8 sq mi (92.6 km^{2})
  - Water: 0.12 sq mi (0.3 km^{2})
- Elevation: 889 ft (271 m)

Population (2020)
  - Total: 3,257
  - Density: 91.1/sq mi (35.2/km^{2})
- Time zone: UTC-5 (Eastern (EST))
  - Summer (DST): UTC-4 (EDT)
- ZIP code(s): 48858, 48893
- Area code: 989
- FIPS code: 26-21140
- GNIS feature ID: 1626168
- Website: https://www.deerfieldtownship.net/

Deerfield Township is a civil township of Isabella County in the U.S. state of Michigan. The population was 3,257 at the 2020 census.

== Communities ==
- Coomer was the name of a rural post office in the township from 1892 until 1906.
- Two Rivers is an unincorporated community located at the intersection of W. River Road and S. Littlefield Road, near the confluence of the Chippewa and Coldwater Rivers, hence the name.

== Geography ==
According to the United States Census Bureau, the township has a total area of 35.9 square miles (93 km^{2}), of which 35.8 square miles (93 km^{2}) is land and 0.1 square miles (0.26 km^{2}) (0.31%) is water.

== Demographics ==
As of the census of 2000, there were 3,081 people, 1,100 households, and 903 families residing in the township. The population density was 86.2 inhabitants per square mile (33.3/km^{2}). There were 1,150 housing units at an average density of 32.2 per square mile (12.4/km^{2}). The racial makeup of the township was 97.31% White, 0.16% African American, 1.14% Native American, 0.39% Asian, 0.03% Pacific Islander, 0.16% from other races, and 0.81% from two or more races. Hispanic or Latino of any race were 0.91% of the population.

There were 1,100 households, out of which 39.9% had children under the age of 18 living with them, 73.4% were married couples living together, 5.6% had a female householder with no husband present, and 17.9% were non-families. 13.8% of all households were made up of individuals, and 5.8% had someone living alone who was 65 years of age or older. The average household size was 2.79 and the average family size was 3.08.

In the township the population was spread out, with 28.5% under the age of 18, 6.8% from 18 to 24, 27.7% from 25 to 44, 27.6% from 45 to 64, and 9.4% who were 65 years of age or older. The median age was 38 years. For every 100 females, there were 98.4 males. For every 100 females age 18 and over, there were 98.6 males.

The median income for a household in the township was $56,250, and the median income for a family was $61,435. Males had a median income of $39,135 versus $27,357 for females. The per capita income for the township was $25,618. About 2.4% of families and 4.6% of the population were below the poverty line, including 5.4% of those under age 18 and 5.5% of those age 65 or over.
