= Chippewa Hills School District =

School district in Michigan

Address
- 3226 Arthur Road Remus, Mecosta County, Michigan, 49340; United States

District information
- Grades: Pre-Kindergarten-12
- Superintendent: Michelle Newman (interim)
- Schools: 6
- Budget: $31,304,000 2022-2023 expenditures
- NCES District ID: 2609560

Students and staff
- Students: 1,785 (2024-2025)
- Teachers: 98.02 (on an FTE basis) (2024-2025)
- Staff: 239.2 FTE (2024-2025)
- Student–teacher ratio: 18.21 (2024-2025)

Other information
- Website: www.chsd.us

Chippewa Hills School District is a public school district in West Michigan.

== Geographic Area ==
In Mecosta County, it serves Barryton, Mecosta, part of Canadian Lakes, the townships of Fork, Morton, Sheridan, and Wheatland, and parts of the townships of Austin, Chippewa, Colfax, Grant, Martiny, and Millbrook. In Isabella County, it serves Lake Isabella, part of Weidman, the townships of Coldwater and Sherman, and parts of the townships of Broomfield, Deerfield, Gilmore, and Nottawa. In Osceola County it serves parts of Orient Township.

== History ==
The former school districts within the district's present boundaries (Barryton, Fouts, and Mecosta-Remus, and Weidman) consolidated in 1967 to form Chippewa Hills School District. The schools in these districts were independent, although not all had high schools.

- Barryton High School was located on the west side of M-66 in Barryton prior to 1967.
- Mecosta High School is first mentioned a newspaper in 1906. Its district consolidated with the Remus district in 1963.
- Remus High School, also known as Remus-Mecosta High School, has existed since at least 1921, when Remus district consolidated with nine other districts. A new high school building, now Mosaic Alternative High School, was built in 1931.
- Weidman High School existed as far back as 1910, when it was mentioned in a local newspaper.

The consolidation established Chippewa Hills High School, which in its first several years used the Barryton School for grades nine and ten and the Remus School for grades eleven and twelve. The other schools served grades kindergarten through eight.

In 1969, a young high school art teacher began the school year sporting a beard to express his individuality. He was quickly fired for it. He contested the firing in Federal Court and he was reinstated with back pay by U.S. District Judge Noel Peter Fox.

Bond issues were passed to fund construction of a high school, the purpose of the consolidation. However, a lawsuit challenged the constitutionality of the K-12 Act of 1964, the law that allowed districts to consolidate in order to form high schools, delaying the construction. As a legislative solution was being worked on, construction began on the high school, and it opened in October 1971.

In 1999, voters passed a bond issue to construct a new middle school on the campus of the high school and convert the former junior high school in Remus into an elementary school.

In 2018, district leadership chose to eliminate Native American imagery from its branding and change the image of its mascot, the Warriors, from a Native American to a medieval knight. In 2022, the district was one of four school districts in Michigan to receive funds from the Native American Heritage Fund to help with costs of changing the branding, such as repainting the logo on the high school gym floor.

Barryton Elementary opened in fall 2021, replacing a former elementary building that once housed Barryton High School. It had been built in 1934 after the previous building collapsed while an addition was being constructed.

== Schools ==
Schools in Chippewa Hills School District
School	Address	Notes
Chippewa Hills High School	3226 Arthur Rd., Remus	Grades 9–12. Built 1971.
Chippewa Hills Middle School	3102 Arthur Rd., Remus	Grades 5–8
Barryton Elementary	19701 30th Avenue, Barryton	Grades PreK-4. Built 2021.
Mecosta Elementary	555 West Main Street, Mecosta	Grades PreK-4
Weidman Elementary	3311 School Road, Weidman	Grades PreK-4
Mosaic School	350 E. Wheatland Avenue, Remus	Alternative high school. Built 1931.
