= Morley Stanwood Community Schools =

School district in Michigan

Address
- 4700 Northland Drive Morley, Mecosta County, Michigan, 49336; United States

District information
- Grades: PreKindergarten–12
- Superintendent: Roger Cole
- Schools: 3
- Budget: $20,183,000 2022-2023 expenditures
- NCES District ID: 2624600

Students and staff
- Students: 970 (2024-2025)
- Teachers: 58.21 (on an FTE basis) (2024-2025)
- Staff: 145.47 FTE (2024-2025)
- Student–teacher ratio: 16.66 (2024-2025)

Other information
- Website: www.morleystanwood.org

Morley Stanwood Community Schools is a public school district in West Michigan. In Mecosta County, it serves Morley, Stanwood, the townships of Aetna, Deerfield, and Mecosta, and parts of the townships of Austin, Big Rapids, Colfax, and Hinton. In Montcalm County, it serves part of Winfield Township. In Newaygo County, it serves parts of Big Prairie Township and Goodwell Township.

== History ==
Prior to 1958, Morley and Stanwood had independent school districts. Stanwood's school was built in 1927 and Morley's school was built in 1922, when the new building was made necessary by the consolidation of rural schools in the area.

In April 1958, the Morley and Stanwood school districts merged to pool tax revenue for the construction of a modern high school. Two months later, voters approved a bond issue to construct the high school. Designed by the architectural firm J. and G. Daverman Associates of Grand Rapids, the building was completed in the summer of 1960.

The current Morley Stanwood Middle/High School was built around 1997. The architect was BETA Design Group of Grand Rapids. The former high school became Morley Stanwood Elementary.

Morley School, by then an elementary school, closed in 2012. Currently it is the Morley Community Center. Stanwood School is being used as the Stanwood Learning Center, a daycare/preschool.

== Schools ==
Schools in Morley Stanwood Community Schools district
| School | Address | Notes |
|---|---|---|
| Morley Stanwood High School | 4700 Northland Drive, Morley | Grades 9-12. |
| Morley Stanwood Middle School | 4700 Northland Drive, Morley | Grades 6-8. |
| Morley Stanwood Elementary | 4808 Northland Drive, Morley | Grades PreK-5. Built 1960. |
