= M-20 (Michigan highway) =

State highway in Michigan, United States

M-20
- M-20 highlighted in red

Route information
- Maintained by MDOT
- Length: 132.435 mi (213.133 km)
- Existed: November 11, 1926–present

Major junctions
- West end: US 31 near New Era
- M-37 in White Cloud; US 131 near Big Rapids; M-66 in Remus; US 127 in Mount Pleasant
- East end: US 10 / Bus. US 10 in Midland

Location
- Country: United States
- State: Michigan
- Counties: Oceana, Newaygo, Mecosta, Isabella, Midland, Bay

Highway system
- Michigan State Trunkline Highway System; Interstate; US; State; Byways
← M-19	→ M-21
← M-212	M-213	→ M-214
← B-86	B-88	→ B-96

M-20 is a state trunkline highway in the US state of Michigan that runs from New Era to Midland. It crosses through rural Lower Peninsula forest land between the two ends. The highway serves the college towns of Big Rapids and Mt. Pleasant, home of the main campuses of Ferris State University and Central Michigan University, both located near the trunkline.

The original July 1919 routing took M-20 farther north along a corridor now used by US Highway 10 (US 10). The M-20 designation was shifted south to the current corridor in 1926. The eastern end was truncated from Bay City to Midland in 1960, following the opening of a freeway between the two cities. The western end was rerouted from Muskegon to New Era in 1969.

== Route description ==
M-20 starts near Lake Michigan at the US 31 freeway in New Era where it runs east through the Manistee National Forest, crossing the North Branch of the White River near Ferry and the South Branch near Hesperia on the way to White Cloud. There it turns south along M-37 and then east along a new routing following Baseline and Newcosta roads north of the Hardy Dam to meet the US 131 freeway at exit 131 near Stanwood. M-20 turns north, running concurrently along the US 131 freeway to Big Rapids and joins Business US 131 (Bus. US 131) at exit 139. The section along the freeway is listed on the National Highway System (NHS), a system of highways important to the nation's economy, defense and mobility. Together Bus. US 131/M-20 runs along the Perry Street commercial corridor to State Street near the main campus of Ferris State University. The business loop turns north by the campus and at Maple Street, M-20 turns eastward to cross the Muskegon River in downtown Big Rapids, north of the campus. M-20 zig-zags southeast of town bypassing the Canadian Lakes area and turns due east through rural Remus in Mecosta County and the Isabella Indian Reservation in neighboring Isabella County.

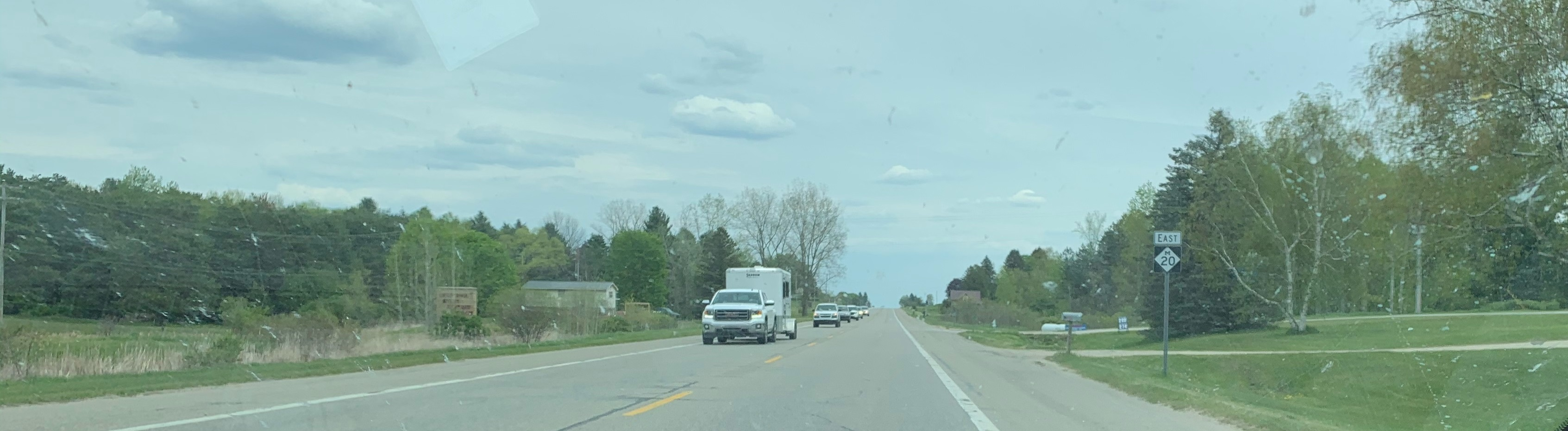
M-20 in Wheatland Township, Mecosta County, looking east

In Mt. Pleasant, M-20 runs near the campus of Central Michigan University crossing the Chippewa River, and the trunkline joins Bus. US 127 along the Mission Street business area to Pickard Road. The highway turns east on Pickard and passes under the US 127 freeway near the Soaring Eagle Casino. From Mt. Pleasant to Midland, M-20 is designed as a four–lane highway with a continuous center turn lane passing through rural forest land. M-20 picks up inclusion on the NHS from this point east.

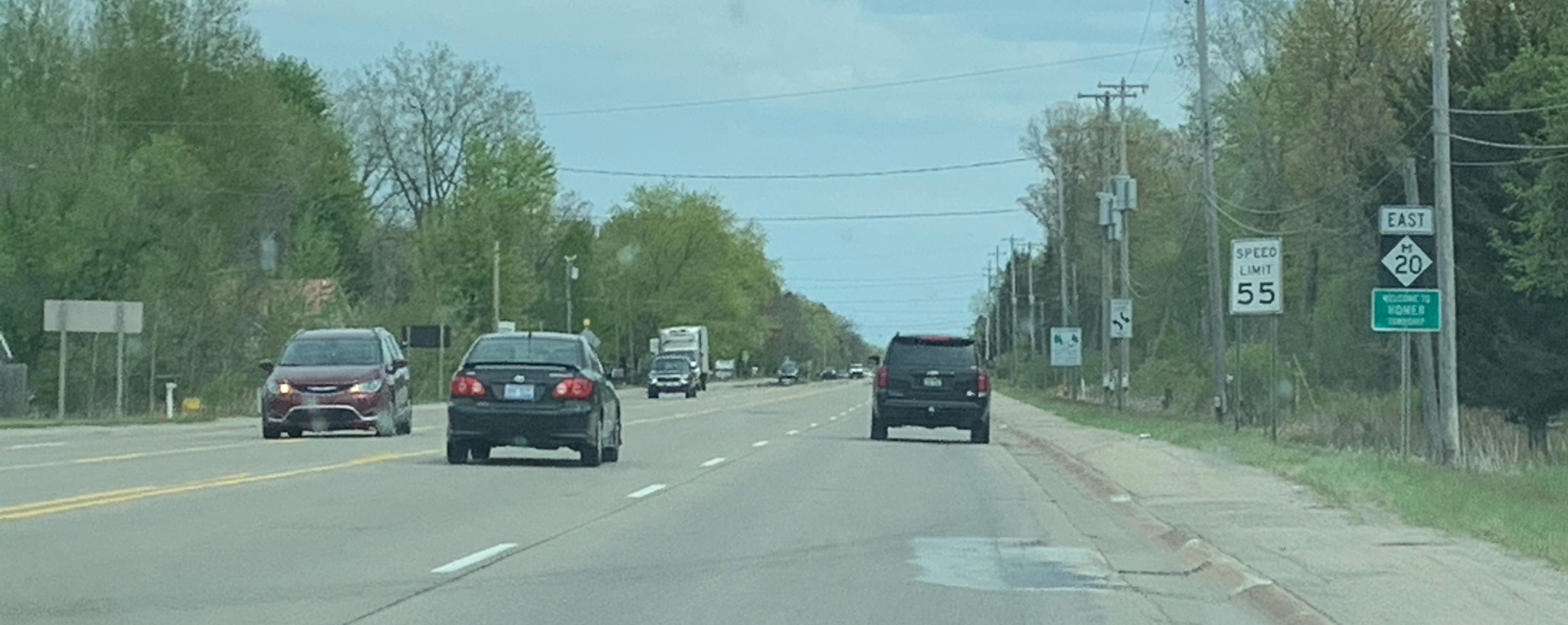
M-20 about to enter Homer Township just west of Midland

Once M-20 reaches Midland on Jerome Street, it crosses the Tittabawassee River north of the Tridge, a three-legged bridge over the confluence of the Tittabawassee and Chippewa rivers. There it joins Business US 10 (Bus. US 10) on a pair of one-way streets: Indian Street (westbound) and Buttles Street (eastbound). The two streets pass by Dow Diamond, home to the Great Lakes Loons, the city's minor league baseball team. Bus. US 10/M-20 then passes some Dow Chemical Company buildings and curves into a freeway stub connecting with the US 10 freeway on the east side of town. This short section of business loop freeway has two interchanges before terminating at one final interchange. At this junction, both Bus. US 10 and M-20 have a common eastern terminus. Traffic headed eastbound on the business loop defaults onto eastbound US 10, and traffic destined for the business loop is fed from the westbound direction of the freeway only.

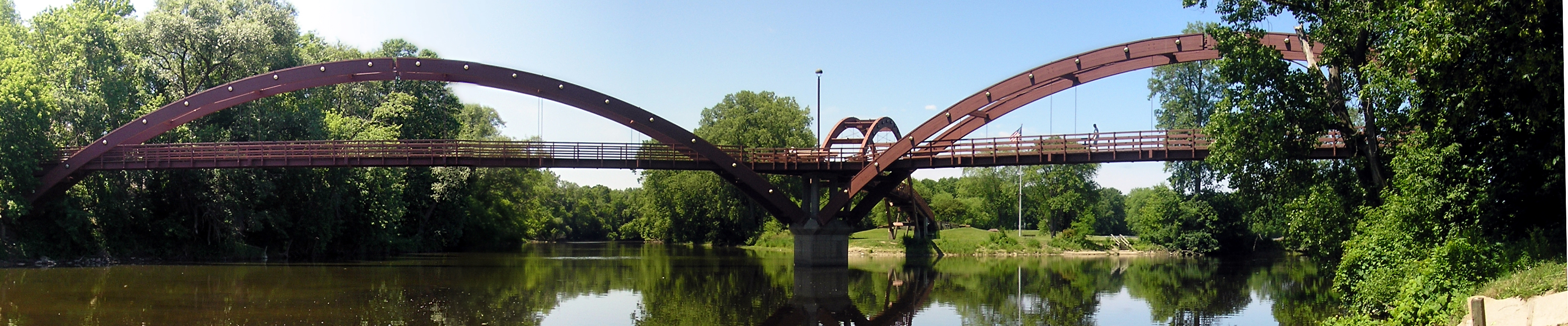
The Tridge in downtown Midland

== History ==
=== Previous designation ===
On July 1, 1919, M-20 was routed from Ludington to Bay City, Michigan by way of Reed City and Clare. This routing was redesignated as US 10 on November 11, 1926. M-20 would be moved to a new routing.

=== Current designation ===
The M-20 designation was moved to a new alignment, roughly today's current routing from Midland through Mt. Pleasant, Big Rapids and White Cloud continuing to Muskegon. The western terminus was extended to end at Muskegon State Park in 1932. The last paving would be completed along M-20 in 1957 in Newaygo County.

M-213
- Location: Muskegon–Muskegon State Park
- Existed: 1961–1970

The eastern end of M-20 was converted to freeway between Midland and Bay City in 1958. The former alignment along Midland Road, from Midland, going through Auburn, and ending at Euclid Avenue in Bay City, at the junction of what was then US 23, was returned to local control at the time. US 10 was rerouted along this freeway section and the Interstate 75/US 23 freeway in 1960. M-20 was truncated back to Midland with the US 10 rerouting. The west end was rerouted through Muskegon to end at US 16 in 1961. The former routing connecting to Muskegon State Park became a new state route designated M-213. M-213 was ultimately removed from the trunkline system in 1970. M-20 was completely rerouted on the west end in 1969 from White Cloud replacing M-82 to US 31 in New Era.

B-88
- Location: White Cloud–Stanwood
- Length: 15.416 mi (24.810 km)
- Existed: 1984–1998

The Michigan Department of Transportation (MDOT) swapped jurisdiction of M-20 and B-88 with Mecosta and Newaygo counties. The swap was finalized on October 1, 1998. M-20 was rerouted south from Big Rapids, along US 131 from exit 139 to exit 131 at Stanwood. There M-20 replaced B-88 westward to M-37.

== Major intersections ==
All exits are unnumbered.

County	Location	mi	km	Destinations	Notes
Oceana	Shelby Township	0.000	0.000	US 31 / LMCT – Muskegon, Ludington; Stony Lake Road	Exit 140 on US 31; roadway continues west as Stony Lake Road
Oceana–Newaygo county line	Hesperia	18.219	29.321	M-120 south – Muskegon	M-120 runs along the county line; northern terminus of M-120
Newaygo	Wilcox Township	31.676	50.978	M-37 north – Baldwin, Traverse City	Northern end of M-37 concurrency
Newaygo	White Cloud	32.948	53.025	M-37 south – Newaygo, Grand Rapids	Southern end of M-37 concurrency
Mecosta	Mecosta Township	48.364	77.834	US 131 south – Grand Rapids	Southern end of US 131 concurrency; exit 131 on US 131
Mecosta	Big Rapids Township	55.814	89.824	US 131 north – Cadillac Bus. US 131 north (Perry Street) – Big Rapids	Northern end of US 131 concurrency; western end of Bus. US 131 concurrency; exit 138 on US 131
Mecosta	Big Rapids	58.419	94.016	Bus. US 131 north (Michigan Avenue)	Eastern end of Bus. US 131 concurrency
Mecosta	Remus	81.814	131.667	M-66 – Lake City, Ionia	
Isabella	Mt. Pleasant	100.767	162.169	Bus. US 127 south (Mission Street)	Southern end of Bus. US 127 concurrency
Isabella	Mt. Pleasant	101.776	163.793	Bus. US 127 north (Mission Street)	Northern end of Bus. US 127 concurrency
Isabella	Union Township	103.244	166.155	US 127 – Clare, Lansing	Exit 143 on US 127
Midland	Homer–Lee township line	121.781	195.988	M-30 (Meridian Road) – West Branch	
Midland	Midland	128.088	206.138	Bus. US 10 west	Western terminus of Bus. US 10 concurency
Midland	Midland	129.830	208.941	Western end of freeway	
Midland	Midland	130.101	209.377	Saginaw Road	Interchange; eastbound exit and westbound entrance via roundabout with Patrick Road
Midland	Midland	131.272	211.262	Waldo Road	Interchange; westbound exit and eastbound entrance
Bay	Midland	132.435	213.133	Bus. US 10 west US 10 east – Bay City	Eastern terminus of Bus. US 10 and M-20; eastbound exit and westbound entrance
1.000 mi = 1.609 km; 1.000 km = 0.621 mi: Concurrency terminus; Incomplete access
