= List of Michigan State Historic Sites in Mecosta County =

Location of Mecosta County in Michigan

The following is a list of Michigan State Historic Sites in Mecosta County, Michigan. Sites marked with a dagger (†) are also listed on the National Register of Historic Places in Mecosta County, Michigan.

== Current listings ==
Name	Image	Location	City	Listing date
Barryton Commemorative Designation		Wayside Park, M-66 Thirtieth Avenue	Barryton	October 20, 1994
Church of the Disciples		3025 11 Mile Road, SW corner of M-66	Remus	March 18, 1982
Clark's Mineral Water Well Informational Site		14300 Northland Dr; N side of FSU Racquet Facility drive off Northland Dr (State St/Old US-131), next to and behind sign	Big Rapids	September 21, 1983
Comstock Mansion	Comstock Mansion	414 Maple Street	Big Rapids	August 3, 1979
Ferris Institute Informational Site		Corner of State Street and Campus Drive on the Ferris State University campus	Big Rapids	January 19, 1957
First United Methodist Church	First United Methodist Church-Big Rapids	304 Elm Street	Big Rapids	June 10, 1987
Logging Wheels Informational Designation		Roadside Park on Northland Road (old US-131)	Paris vicinity	February 12, 1959
Edwin C. Morris House	Edwin C. Morris House	321 Maple Street	Big Rapids	April 25, 1988
Negro Settlers Informational Designation		School Section Lake Park, intersection of 9 Mile Road and 90th Avenue	Mecosta vicinity	July 17, 1970
Nisbett Building†		101 South Michigan Avenue	Big Rapids	August 12, 1977
Old Mecosta Jail House	Old Jail-Big Rapids	220 South Warren Avenue	Big Rapids	February 21, 1975
Paris Fish Hatchery	Paris Fish Hatchery	Paris Park, Northland Road (old US-131), between 22 Mile and 23 Mile roads	Paris vicinity	February 23, 1978
Saint Andrew's Episcopal Church	St. Andrews Episcopal Church-Big Rapids	323 South State Street	Big Rapids	August 15, 1975
Saint Michael's Roman Catholic Church (Demolished)		8997 50th Avenue	Remus	December 18, 1974

== See also ==
- National Register of Historic Places listings in Mecosta County, Michigan

== Sources ==
- Historic Sites Online – Mecosta County. Michigan State Housing Developmental Authority. Accessed January 23, 2011.
