= Mecosta Morton Airport =

Public use airport in Michigan, United States

- IATA: none; ICAO: none; FAA LID: 27C

Summary
- Owner: Mecosta Village/Morton Twp
- Operator: KJ's Family Restaurant
- Serves: Mecosta, Michigan
- Location: Mecosta County, Michigan
- Time zone: UTC−05:00 (-5)
  - Summer (DST): UTC−04:00 (-4)
- Elevation AMSL: 1,022 ft / 312 m
- Coordinates: 43°37′50″N 085°15′41″W
- Interactive map of Mecosta Morton Airport

Runways
| Direction | Length | | Surface |
| Direction | ft | m | Surface |
|---|---|---|---|
| 9/27 | 2,027 | 618 | Turf |
| 3/21 | 2,010 | 613 | Turf |

Statistics (2019)
- Aircraft movements: 100

Mecosta Morton Airport (FAA LID: 27C) is a publicly owned, public use airport located 2 miles west of Mecosta in Mecosta County, Michigan, United States. The airport sits on 12 acres at an elevation of 1022 feet.

In 2016, city leaders began discussing the airport's viability, and considered closing it. It had fallen into disuse, and had lost the airport manager. The owner and employees of a restaurant located across the street agreed to maintain and mow the airport.

== Facilities and aircraft ==
The airport has two runways, both made of turf. Runway 9/27 measures 2027 x 100 ft (618 x 30 m), and runway 3/21 measures 2010 x 100 ft (613 x 30 m).

Based on the 12-month period ending December 31, 2019, the airport averages 100 aircraft operations per year. It is all general aviation. For the same time period, there were no aircraft based at the airport.

The airport does not have any fixed-base operators, and no fuel is available.

== Accidents and incidents ==
- On July 13, 2002, a Cessna 150 nosed over during an aborted takeoff from the Mecosta Morton Airport. The pilot elected to use a short field takeoff procedure, so he applied brakes on the runway and advanced the power prior to releasing the brakes. During the takeoff, the airplane contacted a bump in the terrain and became airborne. The aircraft did not have sufficient flying speed, so the pilot lowered the nose in an attempt to increase the airspeed. The pilot was not sure he would clear the trees at the end of the airport, so he decided to abort the takeoff on the remaining 1,000 feet on the runway by retarding the throttle to idle. During the aborted takeoff, the aircraft bounced once; after settling firmly onto the ground, the pilot applied heavy braking, at which time the nose gear dug into the sandy terrain and the airplane nosed over. The probable cause of the accident was the aircraft's encounter with unsuitable terrain and the pilot's excessive braking during the aborted takeoff.
- On September 15, 2012, a Cessna 182P Skylane suffered substantial damage while landing at the airport. The pilot reported that the aircraft bounced upon touchdown; he initially believed the aircraft would settle and land without further incident, but instead the aircraft landed hard and bounced a second time. The aircraft's nose wheel subsequently impacted the runway, causing the nose landing gear to collapse. The 182 slid on its fuselage before nosing over onto its back.
- An aircraft crashed near the airport on October 18, 2021.

== See also ==
- List of airports in Michigan
