= Charles C. Johnson (politician) =

American politician

Member of the Michigan House of Representatives from the Mecosta County district
- In office January 6, 1909 – December 31, 1910
- Preceded by: Harlow A. Tiffany
- Succeeded by: Alexander V. Young

Personal details
- Born: October 3, 1864 Plainwell, Michigan
- Died: June 2, 1937 (aged 72) Sheridan Township, Michigan
- Party: Republican

Charles C. Johnson (October 3, 1864 – June 2, 1937) was an American politician in Michigan.

== Biography ==
Johnson was born on October 3, 1864, in Plainwell, Michigan. In 1886, Johnson moved to Mecosta Township, Michigan. Johnson was married in 1888.

Johnson served as clerk of Mescosta Township from 1905 to 1906. Johnson also served as township supervisor. On November 3, 1908, Johnson was elected to the Michigan House of Representatives, where he represented the Mecosta County district from January 6, 1909, to December 31, 1910.

Johnson died in Sheridan Township, Mecosta County, on June 2, 1937. He died of lung cancer.
