= Colfax Township, Mecosta County, Michigan =

Colfax Township, Michigan
- Township
- Location within Michigan Location within the United States
- Coordinates: 43°40′54″N 85°23′20″W
- Country: United States
- State: Michigan
- County: Mecosta

Area
  - Total: 35.8 sq mi (93 km^{2})
  - Land: 35.1 sq mi (91 km^{2})
  - Water: 0.7 sq mi (1.8 km^{2})
- Elevation: 1,080 ft (330 m)

Population (2020)
  - Total: 1,962
  - Density: 55.9/sq mi (21.6/km^{2})
- Time zone: UTC-5 (Eastern (EST))
  - Summer (DST): UTC-4 (EDT)
- ZIP codes: 49342 (Rodney); 49307 (Big Rapids)
- FIPS code: 26-107-17160
- GNIS feature ID: 1626113
- Website: https://colfaxtwpmecosta.gov/

Colfax Township is a civil township of Mecosta County in the U.S. state of Michigan. The population was 1,962 at the 2020 census.

== History ==
Colfax Township was organized in 1869.

== Communities ==
- Byers began around a shingle mill in 1870. It was also a depot on the Grand Rapids and Indiana Railroad. It had a post office from 1877 until 1902.
- Rodney is an unincorporated community in the southeast part of the township at 43°40′25″N 85°19′42″W. The Rodney ZIP code, 49342, serves areas in the eastern and north central parts of the township. The Rodney ZIP code also serves most of the western part of Martiny Township as well as small areas of northeast Austin Township and northwest Morton Township to the south and the southeast corner of Grant Township and the southwest part of Chippewa Township to the north. The town is the home to the characters of Jef Mallett's Frazz, a comic strip about a school janitor named Edwin "Frazz" Frazier, a Renaissance man and ultra-triathlete. His bored genius sidekick Caulfield, girlfriend Jane Plainwell, friend James Burke, boss Mr. Spaetzle, discordant teacher Mrs. Olsen, and athletic adversary Coach Hacker all reside in Rodney, and are (except for Caulfield, who is a student) staff at the fictional Bryson Elementary School.

== Geography ==
Colfax Township is in central Mecosta County, with Big Rapids, the county seat, 2 miles (3 km) west of the township's western border. State highway M-20 passes through the center of the township, connecting Big Rapids to the west with Rodney on the eastern edge of the township, then continuing southeast to the village of Mecosta.

According to the U.S. Census Bureau, the township has a total area of 35.8 square miles (93 km^{2}), of which 35.1 square miles (91 km^{2}) are land and 0.7 square miles (1.8 km^{2}), or 2.06%, are water. The majority of the township drains west to the Muskegon River, which crosses the township's southwest corner. The southeast corner of the township drains to the West Branch of the Little Muskegon River.

== Demographics ==
As of the census of 2000, there were 1,975 people, 734 households, and 566 families residing in the township. The population density was 56.2 inhabitants per square mile (21.7/km^{2}). There were 806 housing units at an average density of 22.9 per square mile (8.8/km^{2}). The racial makeup of the township was 96.76% White, 0.46% African American, 0.30% Native American, 0.61% Asian, 0.05% Pacific Islander, and 1.82% from two or more races. Hispanic or Latino of any race were 0.41% of the population.

There were 734 households, out of which 33.8% had children under the age of 18 living with them, 66.6% were married couples living together, 7.6% had a female householder with no husband present, and 22.8% were non-families. 17.7% of all households were made up of individuals, and 5.7% had someone living alone who was 65 years of age or older. The average household size was 2.69 and the average family size was 3.05.

In the township the population was spread out, with 26.9% under the age of 18, 7.8% from 18 to 24, 25.6% from 25 to 44, 27.4% from 45 to 64, and 12.3% who were 65 years of age or older. The median age was 39 years. For every 100 females, there were 101.1 males. For every 100 females age 18 and over, there were 97.7 males.

The median income for a household in the township was $46,071, and the median income for a family was $50,917. Males had a median income of $36,250 versus $23,938 for females. The per capita income for the township was $19,418. About 5.9% of families and 8.9% of the population were below the poverty line, including 6.8% of those under age 18 and 4.5% of those age 65 or over.
