= Mecosta =

Mecosta was a 19th-century Potawatomi chief. His name in the Potawatomi language was Mkozdé, meaning "Having a Bear's Foot" but the name was recorded in English to mean "Big Bear."

Mecosta was born near what is today Big Rapids, Michigan. Mecosta County, Michigan is named for him.

Mecosta is best known as a signer of the Treaty of Logansport (7 Stat. 501) on April 22, 1836, which ceded lands reserved in the Treaty of Tippecanoe, and began the removal of Mecosta's band of Potawatomi from Indiana to lands west of the Mississippi River, as part of the Potawatomi Trail of Death.

The following places in Michigan are directly or indirectly named for the chief:

- Lake Mecosta in Mecosta County, Michigan
- Mecosta, Michigan
- Mecosta County, Michigan
- Mecosta Township, Michigan
