= Martiny Township, Michigan =

- Township
- Location within Michigan Location within the United States
- Coordinates: 43°41′58″N 85°15′19″W
- Country: United States
- State: Michigan
- County: Mecosta

Area
  - Total: 35.43 sq mi (91.8 km^{2})
  - Land: 31.98 sq mi (82.8 km^{2})
  - Water: 3.46 sq mi (9.0 km^{2})
- Elevation: 1,020 ft (311 m)

Population (2020)
  - Total: 1,594
  - Density: 49.8/sq mi (19.2/km^{2})
- Time zone: UTC-5 (Eastern (EST))
  - Summer (DST): UTC-4 (EDT)
- ZIP Codes: 49342 (Rodney); 49332 (Mecosta); 49340 (Remus); 49305 (Barryton)
- FIPS code: 26-107-52060
- GNIS feature ID: 1626702
- Website: martinytownship.org

Martiny Township is a civil township of Mecosta County in the U.S. state of Michigan. The population was 1,594 at the 2020 census.

== Geography ==
According to the United States Census Bureau, the township has a total area of 35.4 square miles (92 km^{2}), of which 32.0 square miles (83 km^{2}) are land and 3.5 square miles (9.1 km^{2}), or 9.75%, are water.

== Demographics ==
As of the census of 2000, there were 1,606 people, 699 households, and 492 families residing in the township. The population density was 49.8 inhabitants per square mile (19.2/km^{2}). There were 1,417 housing units at an average density of 44.0 per square mile (17.0/km^{2}). The racial makeup of the township was 97.70% White, 0.19% African American, 0.56% Native American, 0.25% Asian, 0.12% from other races, and 1.18% from two or more races. Hispanic or Latino of any race were 0.62% of the population.

There were 699 households, out of which 21.6% had children under the age of 18 living with them, 61.4% were married couples living together, 5.7% had a female householder with no husband present, and 29.5% were non-families. 24.3% of all households were made up of individuals, and 11.0% had someone living alone who was 65 years of age or older. The average household size was 2.30 and the average family size was 2.70.

In the township the population was spread out, with 19.9% under the age of 18, 6.2% from 18 to 24, 22.5% from 25 to 44, 30.0% from 45 to 64, and 21.4% who were 65 years of age or older. The median age was 46 years. For every 100 females, there were 102.0 males. For every 100 females age 18 and over, there were 103.5 males.

The median income for a household in the township was $31,681, and the median income for a family was $35,602. Males had a median income of $28,816 versus $25,455 for females. The per capita income for the township was $18,825. About 5.6% of families and 7.7% of the population were below the poverty line, including 6.0% of those under age 18 and 7.9% of those age 65 or over.
