= Mecosta Township, Michigan =

- Township
- Location within Michigan Location within the United States
- Coordinates: 43°36′14″N 85°29′10″W
- Country: United States
- State: Michigan
- County: Mecosta

Area
  - Total: 35.95 sq mi (93.1 km^{2})
  - Land: 34.03 sq mi (88.1 km^{2})
  - Water: 1.92 sq mi (5.0 km^{2})
- Elevation: 876 ft (267 m)

Population (2020)
  - Total: 2,744
  - Density: 80.6/sq mi (31.1/km^{2})
- Time zone: UTC-5 (Eastern (EST))
  - Summer (DST): UTC-4 (EDT)
- ZIP codes: 49346 (Stanwood); 49307 (Big Rapids)
- Area code: 231
- FIPS code: 26-107-52780
- GNIS feature ID: 1626716
- Website: www.mecostatwp.org

Mecosta Township is a civil township of Mecosta County in Michigan. The population was 2,744 as of the 2020 census. The village of Mecosta, which is also in Mecosta County, is in Morton Township, several miles to the east.

== Geography ==
Mecosta Township is in western Mecosta County and is bordered to the west by Newaygo County. The village of Stanwood is in the southeast part of the township, bordered to the east by Austin Township. Big Rapids, the Mecosta county seat, is 4 miles (6 km) north of Mecosta Township's northern border.

According to the U.S. Census Bureau, the township has a total area of 35.9 square miles (93 km^{2}), of which 34.0 square miles (88 km^{2}) are land and 1.9 square miles (4.9 km^{2}), or 5.33%, are water. The Muskegon River flows across the township from northeast to southwest, widening to form Rogers Dam Pond in the northeast and the upstream end of Hardy Dam Pond in the southwest.

U.S. Route 131 crosses the center of the township, leading north to Big Rapids and south to Grand Rapids.

== Demographics ==
As of the census of 2000, there were 2,435 people, 938 households, and 681 families residing in the township. The population density was 71.8 inhabitants per square mile (27.7/km^{2}). There were 1,184 housing units at an average density of 34.9 per square mile (13.5/km^{2}). The racial makeup of the township was 96.92% White, 0.49% African American, 0.66% Native American, 0.12% Asian, 0.21% Pacific Islander, 0.29% from other races, and 1.31% from two or more races. Hispanic or Latino of any race were 1.36% of the population.

There were 938 households, out of which 32.4% had children under the age of 18 living with them, 58.5% were married couples living together, 8.4% had a female householder with no husband present, and 27.3% were non-families. 21.1% of all households were made up of individuals, and 6.2% had someone living alone who was 65 years of age or older. The average household size was 2.59 and the average family size was 2.99.

In the township the population was spread out, with 26.4% under the age of 18, 8.7% from 18 to 24, 28.5% from 25 to 44, 26.0% from 45 to 64, and 10.4% who were 65 years of age or older. The median age was 36 years. For every 100 females, there were 99.6 males. For every 100 females age 18 and over, there were 103.5 males.

The median income for a household in the township was $37,287, and the median income for a family was $42,321. Males had a median income of $32,337 versus $22,219 for females. The per capita income for the township was $18,494. About 6.7% of families and 11.5% of the population were below the poverty line, including 17.4% of those under age 18 and 2.9% of those age 65 or over.

== Notable residents ==
- Charles C. Johnson (born 1864), Michigan state representative
