= Rolland Township, Michigan =

- Civil township
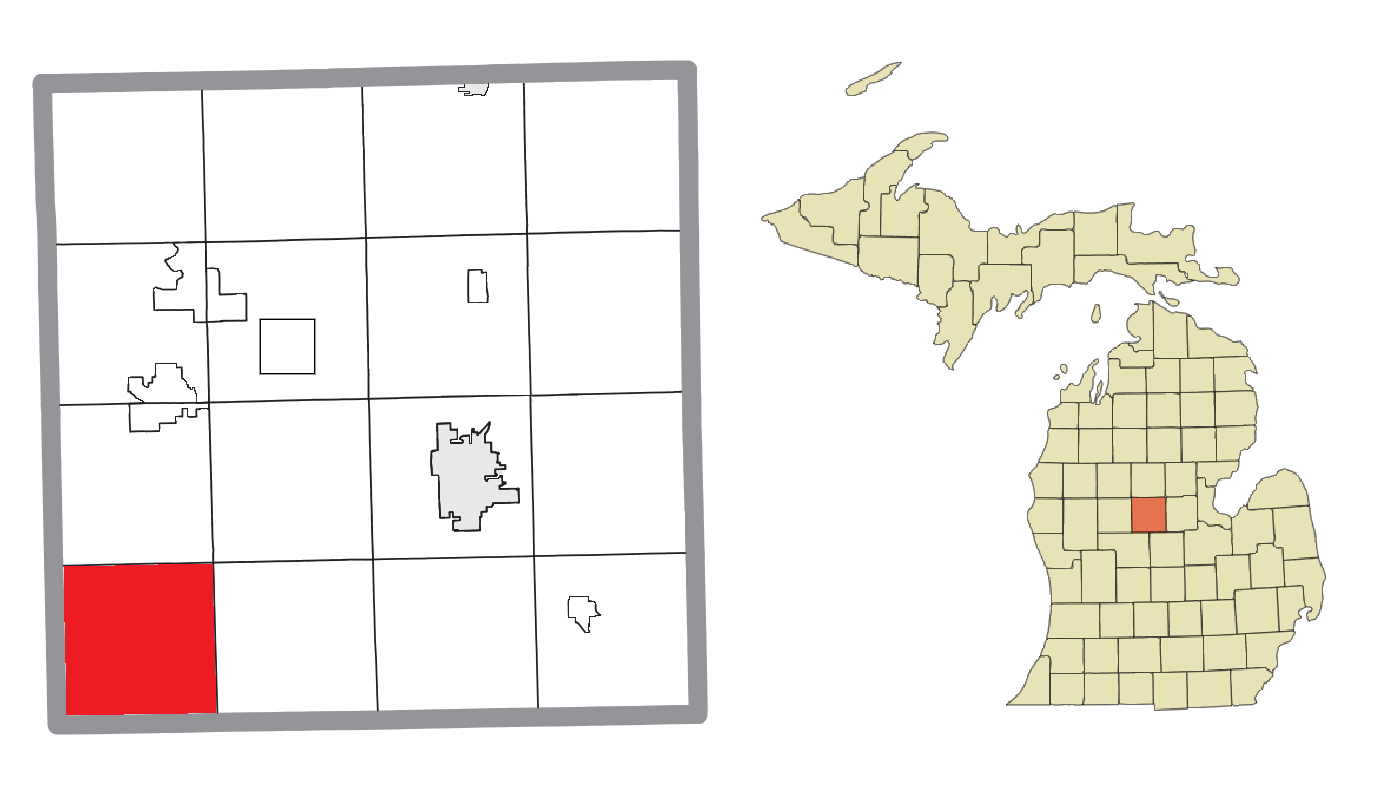
- Location within Isabella County

- Location within the state of Michigan Rolland Township (the United States)
- Coordinates: 43°30′35″N 85°01′35″W
- Country: United States
- State: Michigan
- County: Isabella

Area
  - Total: 35.8 sq mi (92.7 km^{2})
  - Land: 35.7 sq mi (92.5 km^{2})
  - Water: 0.077 sq mi (0.2 km^{2})
- Elevation: 889 ft (271 m)

Population (2020)
  - Total: 1,406
  - Density: 39.4/sq mi (15.2/km^{2})
- Time zone: UTC-5 (Eastern (EST))
  - Summer (DST): UTC-4 (EDT)
- ZIP code(s): 48829, 49310
- Area code: 989
- FIPS code: 26-69300
- GNIS feature ID: 1626997
- Website: https://www.rollandtownship.org/

Rolland Township is a civil township of Isabella County in the U.S. state of Michigan. The population was 1,406 at the 2020 census.

== Communities ==
- Blanchard is an unincorporated community within the township at 43°31′11″N 85°04′48″W, in the southwest corner of Isabella County on the border with Mecosta County and about two miles north of Montcalm County. It is situated about three miles east of M-66 near the south branch of the Pine River. The Blanchard post office, with ZIP code 49310, also serves most of Rolland Township, as well as portions of Broomfield Township to the north and Fremont Township to the east; and in Mecosta County: Wheatland Township to the northwest, Millbrook Township to the west, and Hinton Township to the west of Millbrook; and in Montcalm County: Home Township. Blanchard was incorporated as a village in 1879 but most of its business district was destroyed by a fire in 1884.
- The village of Edmore is to the south in Montcalm County, and the Edmore post office, with ZIP code 48829, also serves a small area of southern Rolland Township.

== Geography ==
According to the United States Census Bureau, the township has a total area of 35.8 square miles (93 km^{2}), of which 35.7 square miles (92 km^{2}) is land and 0.1 square miles (0.26 km^{2}) (0.20%) is water.

== Demographics ==
As of the census of 2000, there were 1,210 people, 465 households, and 346 families residing in the township. The population density was 33.9 inhabitants per square mile (13.1/km^{2}). There were 512 housing units at an average density of 14.3 per square mile (5.5/km^{2}). The racial makeup of the township was 95.95% White, 0.99% African American, 0.41% Native American, 0.41% Asian, 0.25% from other races, and 1.98% from two or more races. Hispanic or Latino of any race were 1.40% of the population.

There were 465 households, out of which 33.8% had children under the age of 18 living with them, 61.1% were married couples living together, 7.3% had a female householder with no husband present, and 25.4% were non-families. 22.2% of all households were made up of individuals, and 8.6% had someone living alone who was 65 years of age or older. The average household size was 2.60 and the average family size was 3.00.

In the township the population was spread out, with 26.4% under the age of 18, 8.7% from 18 to 24, 29.1% from 25 to 44, 25.2% from 45 to 64, and 10.7% who were 65 years of age or older. The median age was 36 years. For every 100 females, there were 112.7 males. For every 100 females age 18 and over, there were 108.7 males.

The median income for a household in the township was $36,643, and the median income for a family was $40,536. Males had a median income of $32,500 versus $26,250 for females. The per capita income for the township was $18,145. About 7.7% of families and 11.6% of the population were below the poverty line, including 17.0% of those under age 18 and 9.4% of those age 65 or over.

== Notable people ==
- Merze Tate, professor, scholar and expert on United States diplomacy; first African-American woman to attend the University of Oxford, first African-American woman to earn a PhD in government and international relations from Harvard University; born in rural Blanchard.
