= Millbrook Township, Michigan =

- Township
- Location within Michigan Location within the United States
- Coordinates: 43°30′15″N 85°8′32″W
- Country: United States
- State: Michigan
- County: Mecosta

Area
  - Total: 35.85 sq mi (92.9 km^{2})
  - Land: 35.77 sq mi (92.6 km^{2})
  - Water: 0.09 sq mi (0.23 km^{2})
- Elevation: 1,093 ft (333 m)

Population (2020)
  - Total: 1,064
  - Density: 29.7/sq mi (11.5/km^{2})
- Time zone: UTC-5 (Eastern (EST))
  - Summer (DST): UTC-4 (EDT)
- ZIP Codes: 49310 (Blanchard); 48850 (Lakeview); 49340 (Remus); 48886 (Six Lakes)
- FIPS code: 26-107-54020
- GNIS feature ID: 1626742

Millbrook Township is a civil township of Mecosta County in the U.S. state of Michigan. The population was 1,064 at the 2020 census.

== Geography ==
The township is in the southeast corner of Mecosta County, bordered to the east by Isabella County and to the south by Montcalm. The unincorporated community of Millbrook is in the northeast corner of the township. State highway M-66 crosses the center of the township from north to south. Big Rapids, the Mecosta county seat, is 30 miles (48 km) by road to the northwest.

According to the United States Census Bureau, the township has a total area of 35.9 square miles (93 km^{2}), of which 35.8 square miles (93 km^{2}) are land and 0.1 square miles (0.26 km^{2}), or 0.24%, are water.

== Demographics ==
As of the census of 2000, there were 1,081 people, 407 households, and 312 families residing in the township. The population density was 30.3 inhabitants per square mile (11.7/km^{2}). There were 461 housing units at an average density of 12.9 per square mile (5.0/km^{2}). The racial makeup of the township was 95.28% White, 1.11% African American, 0.28% Native American, 0.09% Asian, 0.37% Pacific Islander, 1.30% from other races, and 1.57% from two or more races. Hispanic or Latino of any race were 2.13% of the population.

There were 407 households, out of which 34.9% had children under the age of 18 living with them, 62.4% were married couples living together, 8.8% had a female householder with no husband present, and 23.3% were non-families. 19.4% of all households were made up of individuals, and 8.8% had someone living alone who was 65 years of age or older. The average household size was 2.63 and the average family size was 2.96.

In the township the population was spread out, with 26.4% under the age of 18, 7.5% from 18 to 24, 26.5% from 25 to 44, 26.4% from 45 to 64, and 13.3% who were 65 years of age or older. The median age was 37 years. For every 100 females, there were 100.9 males. For every 100 females age 18 and over, there were 99.5 males.

The median income for a household in the township was $35,238, and the median income for a family was $36,645. Males had a median income of $31,500 versus $21,429 for females. The per capita income for the township was $16,064. About 9.3% of families and 11.9% of the population were below the poverty line, including 17.9% of those under age 18 and 6.2% of those age 65 or over.
