= Chippewa Township, Mecosta County, Michigan =

Chippewa Township, Michigan
- Township
- Location within Michigan Location within the United States
- Coordinates: 43°45′57″N 85°16′29″W
- Country: United States
- State: Michigan
- County: Mecosta

Area
  - Total: 35.4 sq mi (92 km^{2})
  - Land: 33.0 sq mi (85 km^{2})
  - Water: 2.4 sq mi (6.2 km^{2})
- Elevation: 1,099 ft (335 m)

Population (2020)
  - Total: 1,227
  - Density: 38/sq mi (14.5/km^{2})
- Time zone: UTC-5 (Eastern (EST))
  - Summer (DST): UTC-4 (EDT)
- ZIP Codes: 49320 (Chippewa Lake); 49631 (Evart); 49305 (Barryton); 49342 (Rodney)
- FIPS code: 26-107-15600
- GNIS feature ID: 1626080
- Website: www.chippewatwp.org

Chippewa Township is a civil township of Mecosta County in the U.S. state of Michigan. As of the 2020 census, the township population was 1,227.

== Communities ==
- Chippewa Lake is a small community in the southwest part of the township, on the south shore of Chippewa Lake. A post box only post office is located there with the ZIP code 49320. The community has had a post office since 1870.

== Geography ==
The township is in northern Mecosta County, bordered to the north by Osceola County. It is 12 miles (19 km) northeast of Big Rapids, the county seat, and 8 miles (13 km) west of Barryton.

According to the United States Census Bureau, the township has a total area of 35.4 square miles (92 km^{2}), of which 33.0 square miles (85 km^{2}) are land and 2.4 square miles (6.2 km^{2}), or 6.83%, are water. Chippewa Lake is in the southwest part of the township. The lake and the majority of the township are in the watershed of the West Branch of the Chippewa River, an east-flowing tributary of the Tittabawassee River and part of the Saginaw River watershed leading to Lake Huron. The northern part of the township drains to the Muskegon River, which flows southwest to Lake Michigan.

== Demographics ==
As of the census of 2000, there were 1,239 people, 518 households, and 356 families residing in the township. The population density was 37.5 inhabitants per square mile (14.5/km^{2}). There were 1,139 housing units at an average density of 34.4 per square mile (13.3/km^{2}). The racial makeup of the township was 97.34% White, 0.16% African American, 0.48% Native American, 0.40% Asian, 0.08% from other races, and 1.53% from two or more races. Hispanic or Latino of any race were 0.32% of the population.

There were 518 households, out of which 25.3% had children under the age of 18 living with them, 56.2% were married couples living together, 7.3% had a female householder with no husband present, and 31.1% were non-families. 25.3% of all households were made up of individuals, and 11.8% had someone living alone who was 65 years of age or older. The average household size was 2.38 and the average family size was 2.81.

In the township the population was spread out, with 20.7% under the age of 18, 8.3% from 18 to 24, 23.6% from 25 to 44, 28.2% from 45 to 64, and 19.0% who were 65 years of age or older. The median age was 43 years. For every 100 females, there were 104.1 males. For every 100 females age 18 and over, there were 102.1 males.

The median income for a household in the township was $33,859, and the median income for a family was $36,563. Males had a median income of $32,778 versus $20,375 for females. The per capita income for the township was $17,336. About 8.1% of families and 10.0% of the population were below the poverty line, including 11.0% of those under age 18 and 10.1% of those age 65 or over.
