= Crossroads Charter Academy =

Coordinates: 43°42′02.5″N 85°29′04″W

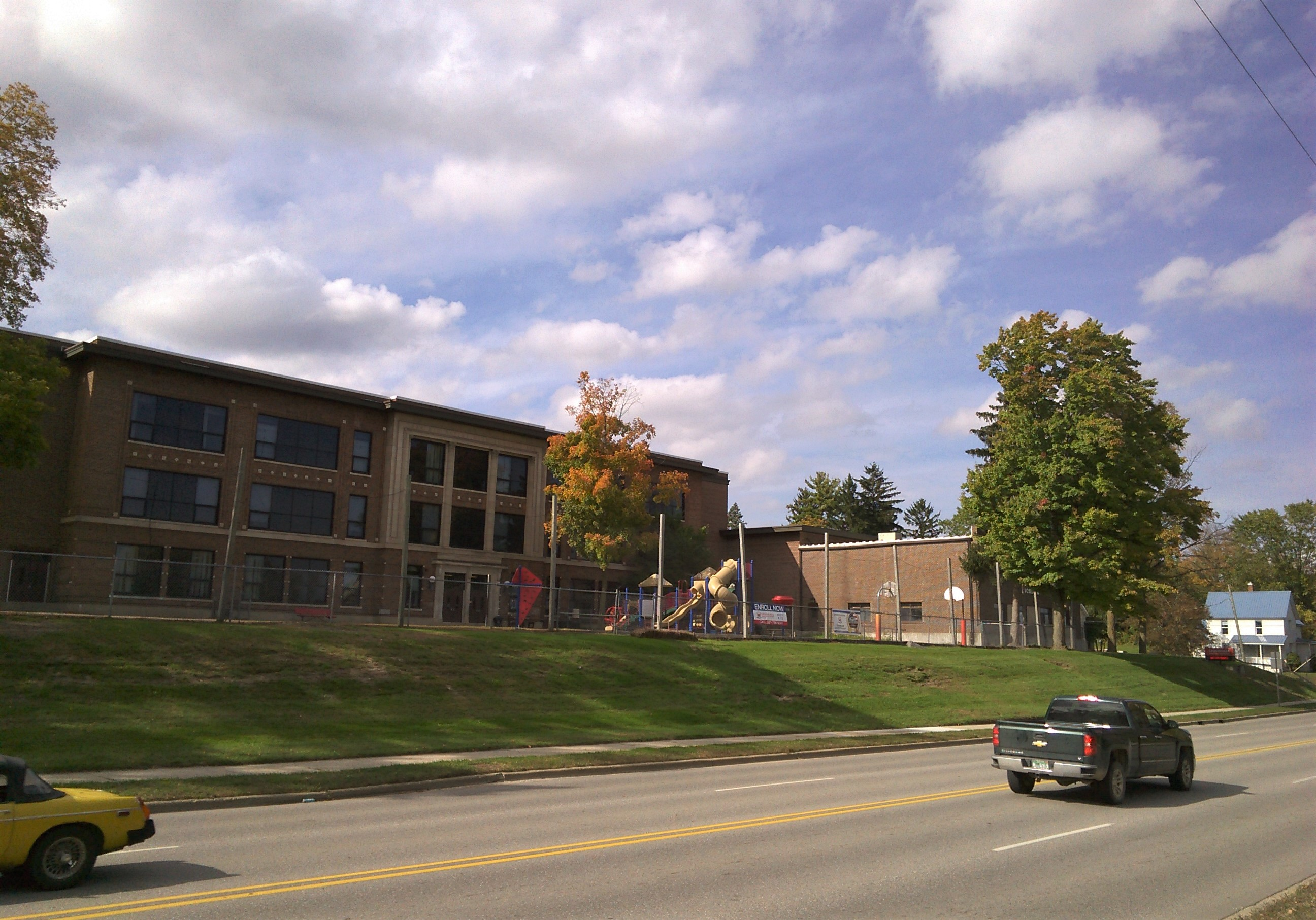

Location
- 215 N. State St. Big Rapids, Michigan; United States

Information
- Type: public
- Established: 1998
- School district: Mecosta-Osceola Intermediate School District
- Superintendent: Erich Harmsen
- Grades: K–12
- Colors: Red, white and blue
- Nickname: Cougars
- Website: http://www.ccabr.org

Crossroads Charter Academy is a tuition-free K-12 public charter school located in Big Rapids, Michigan in Mecosta County.

== History ==
Founded as a K–8 school in 1998, classes met in the former Big Rapids High School building on North State Street.

In 1999, the school added a ninth grade level and continued adding one grade level per year. In August 2002, Crossroads became a K–12 school. In that same year, the school began construction of its new high school building across West Spruce Street. Construction was completed in February 2003, and high school classes moved to that building afterward.

== Academics ==
Students who earn satisfactory scores on the Michigan Educational Assessment Program examination and have a satisfactory grade point average may dual enrol at Ferris State University for credit in place of usual high school courses. Students may also attend the career center or the Math and Science Center, both administered by the Mecosta-Osceola Intermediate School District.

== Athletics ==
The school participates in several sports, including men's soccer, co-ed cross-country track, women's basketball, men's basketball, women's volleyball, women's soccer, co-ed track, and men's baseball. Crossroads Charter Academy was distinguished as the first charter school in Michigan to win a state sports championship when the girls' cross country team won the state finals in 2004. The team won the championship again in 2005. In 2011, the school earned its third state championship trophy when the Boys Track and Field team tied for first place.
