= Merze Tate =

American academic (1904–1996)

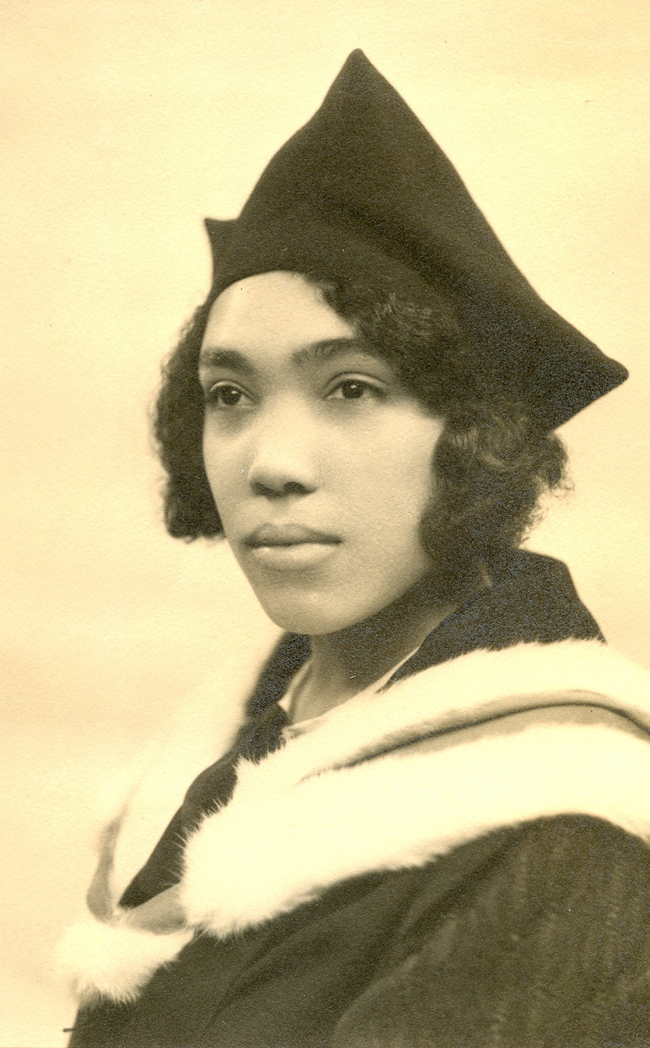
- Born: Vernie Merze Tate; February 6, 1905; Blanchard, Michigan
- Died: June 27, 1996 (aged 91); Washington, D.C.
- Education: Western Michigan Teachers College; Teachers College, Columbia University; University of Oxford; Geneva Graduate Institute; Harvard University
- Occupations: Academic, educator

Vernie Merze Tate (February 6, 1905 – June 27, 1996) was a professor, scholar and expert on United States diplomacy. She was the first African-American graduate of Western Michigan Teachers College, first African-American woman to attend the University of Oxford, first African-American woman to earn a Ph.D. in government and international relations from Harvard University (then Radcliffe College), as well as one of the first two female members to join the Department of History at Howard University.

== Early life and education ==
Tate was born February 6, 1905, in rural Rolland Township, Michigan, to farmers Charles and Myrtle Tate. Her great-grandparents had migrated to Michigan from Ohio after receiving land through the Homestead Act.

She began attending Rolland Township Elementary School Number Five, which was located on land owned by her family. At age 13 she entered Blanchard High School. This high school was destroyed by fire and students had to attend makeshift classrooms in area buildings. Due to inadequate educational facilities, students graduated at the end of the tenth grade. Merze Tate was the youngest and only African-American graduate in her class and was selected valedictorian.

This, however, was unsatisfactory for college entrance, so she enrolled in Battle Creek High School where she maintained a straight-A average while working as a maid. As she was only enrolled in the school for two years she could not be class valedictorian. She did win the Hynman Oratorical Contest which included an award of $50. After graduation Merze applied to Western State Teachers College (now Western Michigan University) and was awarded a tuition scholarship.

After completed the teacher's training program at Western Michigan Teacher's College, Tate taught at an elementary school in Cass County. During this time she continued her education by taking correspondence courses and returned to Western Michigan to complete her Bachelor of Arts degree in three years while maintaining the highest grade average of her classmates. In 1927, she became the first African-American to earn a bachelor's degree from the institution. She also elected to the national social science honor society.

== Career ==
Despite her excellent academic career, Tate could not find employment in the state. At that time, Michigan would not hire African American teachers in its secondary schools. Tate received assistance from administrators at Western Michigan and was able to find a teaching position at Crispus Attucks High School in Indianapolis, Indiana. During her five years there, she founded a school travel club which took students to areas around the country. Whilst teaching, Tate took a part-time master's degree at Teachers College, Columbia University.

In 1932, she won an Alpha Kappa Alpha scholarship to study at Oxford University where she took a B.Litt. in International Relations in 1935. She matriculated as a Home Student of St Anne's College, and was the first African-American woman member of Oxford University. While in Europe, she also attended the Geneva School of International Studies, a summer school of international relations that took place at the Geneva Graduate Institute. Subsequently, she gained a Ph.D. from Harvard University.

In 1936, she became the history and social science department chairman at Bennett College for women, also in North Carolina, where she taught four years. She also spent a year at what is now Morgan State University, where she taught political science and was dean of women, before joining the faculty of Howard University. Tate was the first black woman to become a faculty member of their history department, and she remained there from her appointment in 1942 until her retirement in 1977.

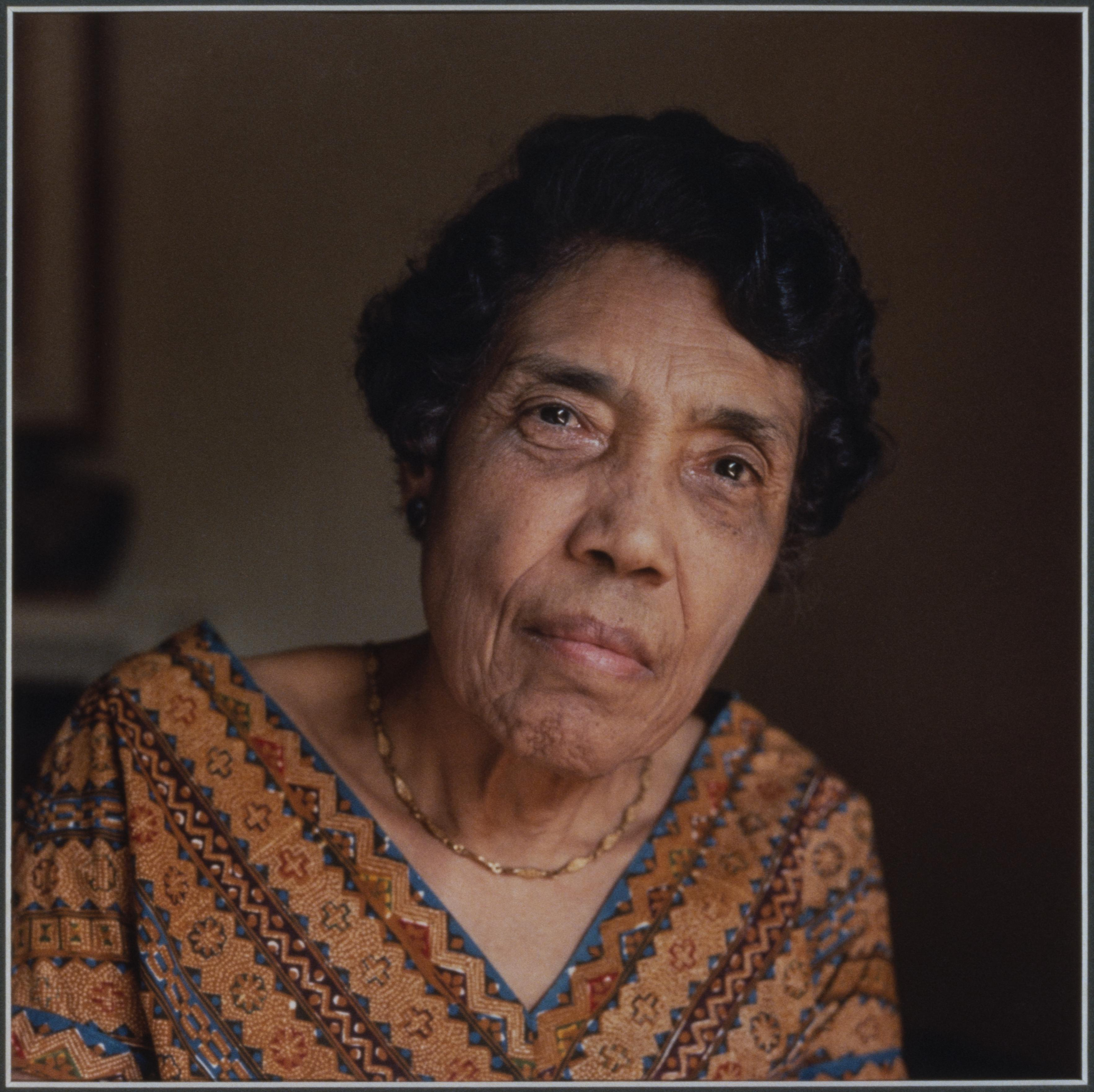
Merze Tate in 1982

Later in her life, Tate was a world traveler and international correspondent for an African-American publication. She visited the White House annually (including meetings with Eleanor Roosevelt) and attended the 1932 Summer Olympics in Los Angeles. Later, she served as a Fulbright Scholar to India from 1950 to 1951.

In 1964, she published an analysis of the effect of nuclear testing on the inhabitants of the Marshall Islands. Tate also designed and secured patents for a refrigerator mixing unit.

She died in Washington DC, following a cardiac arrest. Her papers are held at Howard University.

== Personal life ==
Tate was a practicing Catholic.

== Publications ==
- "Australia and Self-Determination for New Guinea." The Australian Journal of Politics and History 17 (August 1971): 246–59.
- "Recent Constitutional Developments in Papua and New Guinea." Pacific Affairs 44 (Fall 1971): 421–27.
- The United States and the Hawaiian Kingdom: A Political History (New Haven, 1965)
- The United States and Armaments (Cambridge: Harvard University Press, 1948)
- The Disarmament Illusion: The Movement for a Limitation of Armaments to 1907 (New York: MacMillan and Co., 1942)
- Hawaii: Reciprocity Or Annexation ( Michigan State University Press, 1968)
- "Slavery and Racism as Deterrents to the Annexation of Hawaii, 1854-1855," Journal of Negro History 47, no.1 (January 1962): 1–18.
- "The War Aims of World War I and World War II and Their Relation to the Darker Peoples of the World". The Journal of Negro Education, Vol. 12, Summer 1943: 521–532.
- "Australasian Interest in the Commerce and the Sovereignty of Hawaii.” Historical Studies: Australia and New Zealand 11, no. 44 (April 1, 1965): 499–512.
- "Canada's Interest in the Trade and the Sovereignty of Hawaii.” The Canadian Historical Review 44, no. 1 (1963): 20–42.
- "Hawaii: A Symbol of Anglo-American Rapprochement.” Political Science Quarterly 79, no. 4 (1964): 555–75.
- "Decadence of the Hawaiian Nation and Proposals to Import a Negro Labor Force.” The Journal of Negro History 47, no. 4 (1962): 248–63.
- "The Myth of Hawaii's Swing toward Australasia and Canada.” Pacific Historical Review 33, no. 3 (1964): 273–93.
- "British Opposition to the Cession of Pearl Harbor.” Pacific Historical Review 29, no. 4 (November 1, 1960): 381–94.
- "Great Britain and the Sovereignty of Hawaii.” In The SHAFR Guide Online. Brill, April 21, 2022.
- "Twisting the Lion's Tail over Hawaii.” Pacific Historical Review 36, no. 1 (February 1, 1967): 27–46.

== Awards and honors ==
- American Historical Association Award for Scholarly Distinction, 1991
- Inducted into Michigan Women's Hall of Fame, 1991
- Distinguished Alumnus Award, American Association of State Colleges and Universities, 1981
- Distinguished Alumni Award, Western Michigan University, 1970
- Graduate Society Award, Harvard and Radcliffe, 1954

== Legacy ==
- The Merze Tate Prize for Best Article in Historical International Relations is awarded by the International Studies Association
- The Merze Tate Award for the best doctoral dissertation in the field of international relations, law, and politics is presented annually by the American Political Science Association
- The Merze Tate Explorers (formerly the Merze Tate Travel Club) began in 2008 as a project to provide additional skills to girls in grades 6–12. It was founded by Sonya Bernard-Hollins.
- Her hometown renamed their library as the Tate Memorial Library in her honor.
- The Merze Tate Grant and Innovation Center in Western Michigan University's College of Education and Human Development
- Merze Tate College at Western Michigan University
- Merze Tate Student Education Endowment Fund at Western Michigan University started with a $1 million donation from Tate herself
- The Merze Tate Room, in Oxford's Faculty of History building, is named in her honour.
