= Morton Township, Michigan =

- Township
- Location within Michigan Location within the United States
- Coordinates: 43°35′48″N 85°16′59″W
- Country: United States
- State: Michigan
- County: Mecosta

Area
  - Total: 35.6 sq mi (92 km^{2})
  - Land: 33.0 sq mi (85 km^{2})
  - Water: 2.6 sq mi (6.7 km^{2})
- Elevation: 965 ft (294 m)

Population (2020)
  - Total: 4,426
  - Density: 134/sq mi (52/km^{2})
- Time zone: UTC-5 (Eastern (EST))
  - Summer (DST): UTC-4 (EDT)
- ZIP codes: 49332 (Mecosta), 49346 (Stanwood), 49342 (Rodney)
- FIPS code: 26-107-55600
- GNIS feature ID: 1626768
- Website: mortontownship.org

Morton Township is a civil township of Mecosta County in the U.S. state of Michigan. The population was 4,426 at the 2020 census.

== Communities ==
- Canadian Lakes is an unincorporated community in the southwest part of the township.
- The village of Mecosta is in the northeast part of the township.

== Geography ==
Morton Township is in central Mecosta County, 17 miles (27 km) southeast of Big Rapids, the county seat. According to the U.S. Census Bureau, the township has a total area of 35.6 square miles (92 km^{2}), of which 33.0 square miles (85 km^{2}) are land and 2.6 square miles (6.7 km^{2}), or 7.27%, are water. A cluster of small lakes, including Canadian Lakes, Lake Mecosta, Round Lake, and Blue Lake, occupy the western half of the township.

== Demographics ==
Historical population
Census	Pop.	Note	%±
1880	471		—
1890	967		105.3%
1900	966		−0.1%
1910	905		−6.3%
1920	793		−12.4%
1930	662		−16.5%
1940	698		5.4%
1950	732		4.9%
1960	749		2.3%
1970	998		33.2%
1980	1,789		79.3%
1990	2,122		18.6%
2000	3,597		69.5%
2010	4,311		19.8%
2020	4,426		2.7%
U.S. Decennial Census

As of the census of 2000, there were 3,597 people, 1,618 households, and 1,216 families residing in the township. The population density was 108.5 inhabitants per square mile (41.9/km^{2}). There were 2,794 housing units at an average density of 84.3 per square mile (32.5/km^{2}). The racial makeup of the township was 94.77% White, 1.61% African American, 0.31% Native American, 0.25% Asian, 0.33% from other races, and 2.72% from two or more races. Hispanic or Latino of any race were 1.11% of the population.

There were 1,618 households, out of which 17.3% had children under the age of 18 living with them, 65.9% were married couples living together, 5.9% had a female householder with no husband present, and 24.8% were non-families. 21.6% of all households were made up of individuals, and 11.9% had someone living alone who was 65 years of age or older. The average household size was 2.22 and the average family size was 2.50.

In the township the population was spread out, with 16.8% under the age of 18, 4.5% from 18 to 24, 16.6% from 25 to 44, 33.0% from 45 to 64, and 29.2% who were 65 years of age or older. The median age was 54 years. For every 100 females, there were 98.3 males. For every 100 females age 18 and over, there were 94.8 males.

The median income for a household in the township was $41,422, and the median income for a family was $46,571. Males had a median income of $35,195 versus $25,288 for females. The per capita income for the township was $24,729. About 6.4% of families and 9.1% of the population were below the poverty line, including 16.8% of those under age 18 and 5.2% of those age 65 or over.
