= Sheridan Township, Mecosta County, Michigan =

Sheridan Township, Michigan
- Township
- Location within Michigan Location within the United States
- Coordinates: 43°42′3″N 85°9′42″W
- Country: United States
- State: Michigan
- County: Mecosta

Area
  - Total: 35.8 sq mi (93 km^{2})
  - Land: 34.8 sq mi (90 km^{2})
  - Water: 1.0 sq mi (2.6 km^{2})
- Elevation: 1,060 ft (323 m)

Population (2020)
  - Total: 1,314
  - Density: 37.8/sq mi (14.6/km^{2})
- Time zone: UTC-5 (Eastern (EST))
  - Summer (DST): UTC-4 (EDT)
- ZIP Codes: 49340 (Remus); 49332 (Mecosta)
- FIPS code: 26-107-73080
- GNIS feature ID: 1627068
- Website: www.sheridantownship.com

Sheridan Township is a civil township of Mecosta County in the U.S. state of Michigan. The population was 1,314 at the 2020 census.

== Geography ==
The township is in eastern Mecosta County, bordered to the east by Isabella County. According to the United States Census Bureau, the township has a total area of 35.8 square miles (93 km^{2}), of which 34.8 square miles (90 km^{2}) are land and 1.0 square mile (2.6 km^{2}), or 2.71%, is water.

== Demographics ==
As of the census of 2000, there were 1,357 people, 519 households, and 387 families residing in the township. The population density was 39.0 inhabitants per square mile (15.1/km^{2}). There were 921 housing units at an average density of 26.5 per square mile (10.2/km^{2}). The racial makeup of the township was 92.41% White, 3.54% African American, 0.74% Native American, 0.22% Asian, 0.22% from other races, and 2.87% from two or more races. Hispanic or Latino of any race were 1.33% of the population.

There were 519 households, out of which 33.7% had children under the age of 18 living with them, 60.5% were married couples living together, 9.6% had a female householder with no husband present, and 25.4% were non-families. 18.5% of all households were made up of individuals, and 8.9% had someone living alone who was 65 years of age or older. The average household size was 2.61 and the average family size was 2.97.

In the township the population was spread out, with 27.6% under the age of 18, 6.9% from 18 to 24, 26.2% from 25 to 44, 25.9% from 45 to 64, and 13.4% who were 65 years of age or older. The median age was 37 years. For every 100 females, there were 102.5 males. For every 100 females age 18 and over, there were 98.6 males.

The median income for a household in the township was $31,050, and the median income for a family was $34,861. Males had a median income of $30,893 versus $21,964 for females. The per capita income for the township was $15,076. About 11.8% of families and 14.9% of the population were below the poverty line, including 17.1% of those under age 18 and 9.4% of those age 65 and over.
