= Muskegon State Park =

Park in Michigan, U.S.

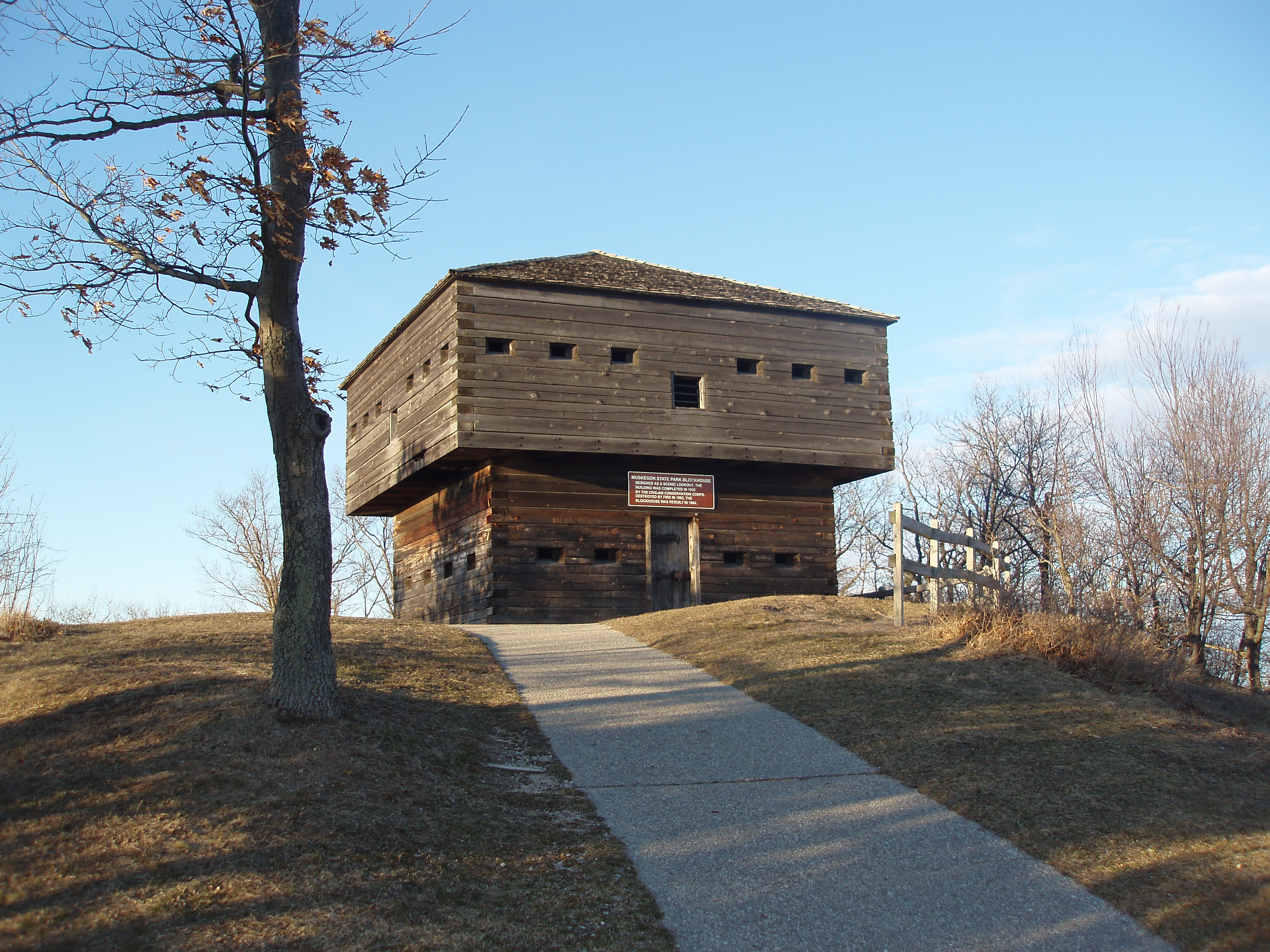
- Southwest view of the blockhouse

- Location within Michigan
- Location: Lower Peninsula, Muskegon County, Michigan, [U.S.
- Nearest city: North Muskegon, Michigan
- Coordinates: 43°14′26″N 86°20′22″W
- Area: 1,233 acres (499 ha)
- Elevation: 643 feet (196 m)
- Established: 1923
- Administrator: Michigan Department of Natural Resources
- Designation: Michigan state park
- Website: Official website

Muskegon State Park is a public recreation area located four miles (6.4 km) west of North Muskegon in Muskegon County, Michigan. The park's 1,233 acres (499 ha) encompass two miles of sand beach on Lake Michigan and one mile of beach on Muskegon Lake.

== History ==
The park was established in 1923 when the state purchased some 840 acres at the former site of the Ryerson Hill & Company lumber mill in Snug Harbor. The Civilian Conservation Corps was active in the park in 1933 and 1934, building roads, planting trees and clearing campsites. Most notably, the corps built a square blockhouse with scenic views from the highest point in Muskegon County. A replica stands at the site of the CCC's original blockhouse which burned down in the 1960s. The Works Progress Administration made further improvements from 1937 to 1941, developing the beach area and extending the scenic drive along Lake Michigan.

== Activities and amenities ==
The park offers swimming, picnicking, two fishing piers, twelve miles of hiking trails, boat launch, and two campgrounds. Winter offerings in the park include five miles of cross-country skiing trails, ice skating, and ice fishing. The park features a luge track, where U.S. Olympic team member Mark Grimmette started training.
