= Grant Township, Mecosta County, Michigan =

Grant Township, Michigan
- Township
- Location within Michigan Location within the United States
- Coordinates: 43°46′45″N 85°23′33″W
- Country: United States
- State: Michigan
- County: Mecosta

Area
  - Total: 34.0 sq mi (88 km^{2})
  - Land: 32.6 sq mi (84 km^{2})
  - Water: 1.4 sq mi (3.6 km^{2})
- Elevation: 1,047 ft (319 m)

Population (2020)
  - Total: 702
  - Density: 21.5/sq mi (8.3/km^{2})
- Time zone: UTC-5 (Eastern (EST))
  - Summer (DST): UTC-4 (EDT)
- ZIP Codes: 49307 (Big Rapids); 49639 (Hersey)
- FIPS code: 26-107-34340
- GNIS feature ID: 1626383

Grant Township is a civil township of Mecosta County in the U.S. state of Michigan. As of the 2020 census, the township population was 702.

== Geography ==
The township is in northern Mecosta County and is bordered to the north by Osceola County. The Muskegon River forms the northwest border of the township. According to the U.S. Census Bureau, the township has a total area of 34.0 square miles (88 km^{2}), of which 32.6 square miles (84 km^{2}) are land and 1.4 square miles (3.6 km^{2}), or 4.05%, are water.

== Demographics ==
As of the census of 2000, there were 680 people, 274 households, and 198 families residing in the township. The population density was 20.9 inhabitants per square mile (8.1/km^{2}). There were 338 housing units at an average density of 10.4 per square mile (4.0/km^{2}). The racial makeup of the township was 97.21% White, 0.59% African American, 0.59% Native American, 0.29% from other races, and 1.32% from two or more races. Hispanic or Latino of any race were 0.29% of the population.

There were 274 households, out of which 27.0% had children under the age of 18 living with them, 65.0% were married couples living together, 4.0% had a female householder with no husband present, and 27.7% were non-families. 21.9% of all households were made up of individuals, and 7.3% had someone living alone who was 65 years of age or older. The average household size was 2.48 and the average family size was 2.95.

In the township the population was spread out, with 24.3% under the age of 18, 5.4% from 18 to 24, 26.5% from 25 to 44, 29.9% from 45 to 64, and 14.0% who were 65 years of age or older. The median age was 42 years. For every 100 females, there were 109.9 males. For every 100 females age 18 and over, there were 108.5 males.

The median income for a household in the township was $36,071, and the median income for a family was $39,167. Males had a median income of $30,972 versus $22,000 for females. The per capita income for the township was $17,886. About 5.0% of families and 7.2% of the population were below the poverty line, including 11.2% of those under age 18 and 9.1% of those age 65 or over.
