= Austin Township, Mecosta County, Michigan =

Austin Township, Michigan
- Township
- Location within Michigan Location within the United States
- Coordinates: 43°35′54″N 85°22′25″W
- Country: United States
- State: Michigan
- County: Mecosta

Area
  - Total: 35.75 sq mi (92.6 km^{2})
  - Land: 35.67 sq mi (92.4 km^{2})
  - Water: 0.09 sq mi (0.23 km^{2})
- Elevation: 1,020 ft (311 m)

Population (2020)
  - Total: 1,715
  - Density: 48.1/sq mi (18.6/km^{2})
- Time zone: UTC-5 (Eastern (EST))
  - Summer (DST): UTC-4 (EDT)
- ZIP Codes: 49346 (Stanwood); 49307 (Big Rapids); 49342 (Rodney)
- FIPS code: 26-107-04380
- GNIS feature ID: 1625867
- Website: www.austintownship.org

Austin Township is a civil township of Mecosta County in the U.S. state of Michigan. As of the 2020 census, the township population was 1,715.

== Geography ==
The township is in central Mecosta County, 11 miles (18 km) southeast of Big Rapids, the county seat. A portion of the community of Canadian Lakes is in the eastern part of the township, while the village of Stanwood borders the township to the west.

According to the United States Census Bureau, Austin Township has a total area of 35.8 square miles (93 km^{2}), of which 35.7 square miles (92 km^{2}) are land and 0.1 square miles (0.26 km^{2}), or 0.24%, are water. The Muskegon River crosses the northwest corner of the township, flowing southwesterly toward Lake Michigan.

== Demographics ==
As of the census of 2000, there were 1,415 people, 499 households, and 402 families residing in the township. The population density was 39.7 inhabitants per square mile (15.3/km^{2}). There were 659 housing units at an average density of 18.5 per square mile (7.1/km^{2}). The racial makeup of the township was 98.09% White, 0.28% African American, 0.57% Native American, 0.14% Asian, 0.21% from other races, and 0.71% from two or more races. Hispanic or Latino of any race were 1.13% of the population.

There were 499 households, out of which 33.7% had children under the age of 18 living with them, 69.9% were married couples living together, 7.6% had a female householder with no husband present, and 19.4% were non-families. 16.6% of all households were made up of individuals, and 7.8% had someone living alone who was 65 years of age or older. The average household size was 2.81 and the average family size was 3.15.

In the township the population was spread out, with 29.3% under the age of 18, 8.4% from 18 to 24, 25.3% from 25 to 44, 21.2% from 45 to 64, and 15.8% who were 65 years of age or older. The median age was 36 years. For every 100 females, there were 96.3 males. For every 100 females age 18 and over, there were 95.9 males.

The median income for a household in the township was $34,674, and the median income for a family was $40,417. Males had a median income of $31,184 versus $25,052 for females. The per capita income for the township was $15,986. About 6.5% of families and 11.6% of the population were below the poverty line, including 18.1% of those under age 18 and 7.3% of those age 65 or over.
