= Big Rapids Township, Michigan =

Big Rapids Charter Township
- Charter township
- Location within Michigan Location within the United States
- Coordinates: 43°40′50″N 85°29′28″W
- Country: United States
- State: Michigan
- County: Mecosta

Area
  - Total: 30.90 sq mi (80.0 km^{2})
  - Land: 30.47 sq mi (78.9 km^{2})
  - Water: 0.43 sq mi (1.1 km^{2})
- Elevation: 1,020 ft (311 m)

Population (2020)
  - Total: 3,917
  - Density: 128.5/sq mi (49.6/km^{2})
- Time zone: UTC-5 (Eastern (EST))
  - Summer (DST): UTC-4 (EDT)
- ZIP code: 49307 (Big Rapids)
- Area code: 231
- FIPS code: 26-107-08320
- GNIS feature ID: 1625935
- Website: bigrapidstownshipmi.gov

Big Rapids Township is a charter township of Mecosta County in the U.S. state of Michigan. As of the 2020 census, the township population was 3,917.

The city of Big Rapids is surrounded by the charter township but, like all cities in Michigan, is a completely separate jurisdiction from any townships adjacent to it. But whereas cities, as municipal corporations, can cross county lines, civil and charter townships, as administrative divisions of a county, cannot.

== History ==
In February 1858, the Newaygo County Supervisors approved the organization of Green and Leonard townships in the unorganized "paper" county of Mecosta. The Mecosta county government was organized on February 11, 1859, with the village of Leonard as its seat. The Leonard post office changed its name to Big Rapids on September 29, 1859. Thus the June 1, 1860, U.S. Federal Census lists inhabitants of Leonard Township, with their post office as "Big Rapids".

In 1865, by act of the Michigan Legislature, the name of Leonard Township was changed to Big Rapids Township.

== Geography ==
The township is in western Mecosta County and is bordered to the west by Newaygo County. According to the United States Census Bureau, the township has a total area of 30.9 square miles (80 km^{2}), of which 30.5 square miles (79 km^{2}) are land and 0.4 square miles (1.0 km^{2}), or 1.40%, are water. The Muskegon River, a tributary of Lake Michigan, flows southward through the eastern part of the township.

U.S. Route 131, a four-lane freeway, crosses the township, leading north 41 miles (66 km) to Cadillac and south 54 miles (87 km) to Grand Rapids.

== Demographics ==
Historical population
Census	Pop.	Note	%±
1870	465		—
1880	549		18.1%
1890	655		19.3%
1900	683		4.3%
1910	668		−2.2%
1920	601		−10.0%
1930	509		−15.3%
1940	607		19.3%
1950	698		15.0%
1960	789		13.0%
1970	1,687		113.8%
1980	2,471		46.5%
1990	3,100		25.5%
2000	3,249		4.8%
2010	4,208		29.5%
2020	3,917		−6.9%
U.S. Decennial Census

As of the census of 2000, there were 3,249 people, 1,200 households, and 813 families residing in the township. The population density was 105.9 inhabitants per square mile (40.9/km^{2}). There were 1,287 housing units at an average density of 42.0 per square mile (16.2/km^{2}). The racial makeup of the township was 94.06% White, 2.06% African American, 0.40% Native American, 1.91% Asian, 0.03% Pacific Islander, 0.37% from other races, and 1.17% from two or more races. Hispanic or Latino residents of any race were 1.02% of the population.

There were 1,200 households, out of which 31.6% had children under the age of 18 living with them, 57.7% were married couples living together, 7.3% had a female householder with no husband present, and 32.3% were non-families. 19.3% of all households were made up of individuals, and 5.7% had someone living alone who was 65 years of age or older. The average household size was 2.61 and the average family size was 3.02.

In the township, 23.0% of the population was under the age of 18, 15.3% was from 18 to 24, 24.7% from 25 to 44, 23.9% from 45 to 64, and 13.1% was 65 years of age or older. The median age was 36 years. For every 100 females, there were 104.6 males. For every 100 females age 18 and over, there were 104.8 males.

The median income for a household in the township was $47,933, and the median income for a family was $60,583. Males had a median income of $38,510 versus $30,893 for females. The per capita income for the township was $22,761. About 6.0% of families and 10.6% of the population were below the poverty line, including 6.2% of those under age 18 and 8.7% of those age 65 or over.
