= Stanwood, Michigan =

- Village
- Location of Stanwood, Michigan
- Coordinates: 43°34′47″N 85°26′57″W
- Country: United States
- State: Michigan
- County: Mecosta
- Township: Mecosta
- Incorporated: 1907

Area
  - Total: 0.24 sq mi (0.63 km^{2})
  - Land: 0.24 sq mi (0.63 km^{2})
  - Water: 0 sq mi (0.00 km^{2})
- Elevation: 974 ft (297 m)

Population (2020)
  - Total: 194
  - Density: 800.9/sq mi (309.21/km^{2})
- Time zone: UTC-5 (Eastern (EST))
  - Summer (DST): UTC-4 (EDT)
- ZIP code: 49346
- Area code: 231
- FIPS code: 26-76240
- GNIS feature ID: 1621761

Stanwood is a village in Mecosta Township, Mecosta County, State of Michigan, USA. The population was 194 at the 2020 Census.

Stanwood holds the record for the hottest recorded temperature in the state of Michigan along with Mio when it reached 112 °F (44 °C) on July 13, 1936.

== Geography ==
Stanwood is in western Mecosta County, in southeastern Mecosta Township. It is bordered to the east by Austin Township. Big Rapids, the county seat, is 9 miles (14 km) to the north, and Morley is 6 miles (10 km) to the south.

According to the United States Census Bureau, the village has a total area of 0.24 square miles (0.62 km^{2}), all of it recorded as land. Macks Creek cuts across the southwest corner of the village, flowing northwest toward the Muskegon River.

== Demographics ==
Historical population
Census	Pop.	Note	%±
1880	146		—
1910	185		—
1920	278		50.3%
1930	160		−42.4%
1940	182		13.8%
1950	189		3.8%
1960	205		8.5%
1970	241		17.6%
1980	209		−13.3%
1990	174		−16.7%
2000	204		17.2%
2010	211		3.4%
2020	194		−8.1%
U.S. Decennial Census

The area was settled by Ontario native John Bell in the 1850s. He was one of the first settlers in the area and logged in what would become Bell's Siding, which was a logging community, that was located near modern-day Morley Stanwood Middle School and High School.

=== 2010 census ===
As of the census of 2010, there were 211 people, 76 households, and 59 families residing in the village. The population density was 879.2 inhabitants per square mile (339.5/km^{2}). There were 84 housing units at an average density of 350.0 per square mile (135.1/km^{2}). The racial makeup of the village was 95.3% White, 2.8% African American, and 1.9% from two or more races. Hispanic or Latino of any race were 2.8% of the population.

There were 76 households, of which 40.8% had children under the age of 18 living with them, 57.9% were married couples living together, 17.1% had a female householder with no husband present, 2.6% had a male householder with no wife present, and 22.4% were non-families. 18.4% of all households were made up of individuals, and 3.9% had someone living alone who was 65 years of age or older. The average household size was 2.78 and the average family size was 3.07.

The median age in the village was 37.4 years. 26.1% of residents were under the age of 18; 10.4% were between the ages of 18 and 24; 22.8% were from 25 to 44; 29.4% were from 45 to 64; and 11.4% were 65 years of age or older. The gender makeup of the village was 51.2% male and 48.8% female.

=== 2000 census ===
As of the census of 2000, there were 204 people, 77 households, and 58 families residing in the village. The population density was 836.0 inhabitants per square mile (322.8/km^{2}). There were 83 housing units at an average density of 340.1 per square mile (131.3/km^{2}). The racial makeup of the village was 99.51% White, and 0.49% from two or more races.

There were 77 households, out of which 33.8% had children under the age of 18 living with them, 62.3% were married couples living together, 7.8% had a female householder with no husband present, and 23.4% were non-families. 18.2% of all households were made up of individuals, and 6.5% had someone living alone who was 65 years of age or older. The average household size was 2.65 and the average family size was 2.97.

In the village, the population was spread out, with 25.0% under the age of 18, 6.9% from 18 to 24, 30.9% from 25 to 44, 27.0% from 45 to 64, and 10.3% who were 65 years of age or older. The median age was 38 years. For every 100 females, there were 98.1 males. For every 100 females age 18 and over, there were 104.0 males.

The median income for a household in the village was $39,000, and the median income for a family was $43,750. Males had a median income of $31,875 versus $25,625 for females. The per capita income for the village was $17,121. None of the families and 3.8% of the population were living below the poverty line.

== Transportation ==
- Indian Trails provides daily intercity bus service between Grand Rapids and Petoskey, Michigan.

== Economy ==
Nestlé Waters North America has a plant in Stanwood that produces Ice Mountain and Nestlé Pure Life bottled water.

== Notable people ==
- Ray Herbert, baseball player
