= Mecosta County, Michigan =

County in Michigan, United States

- County
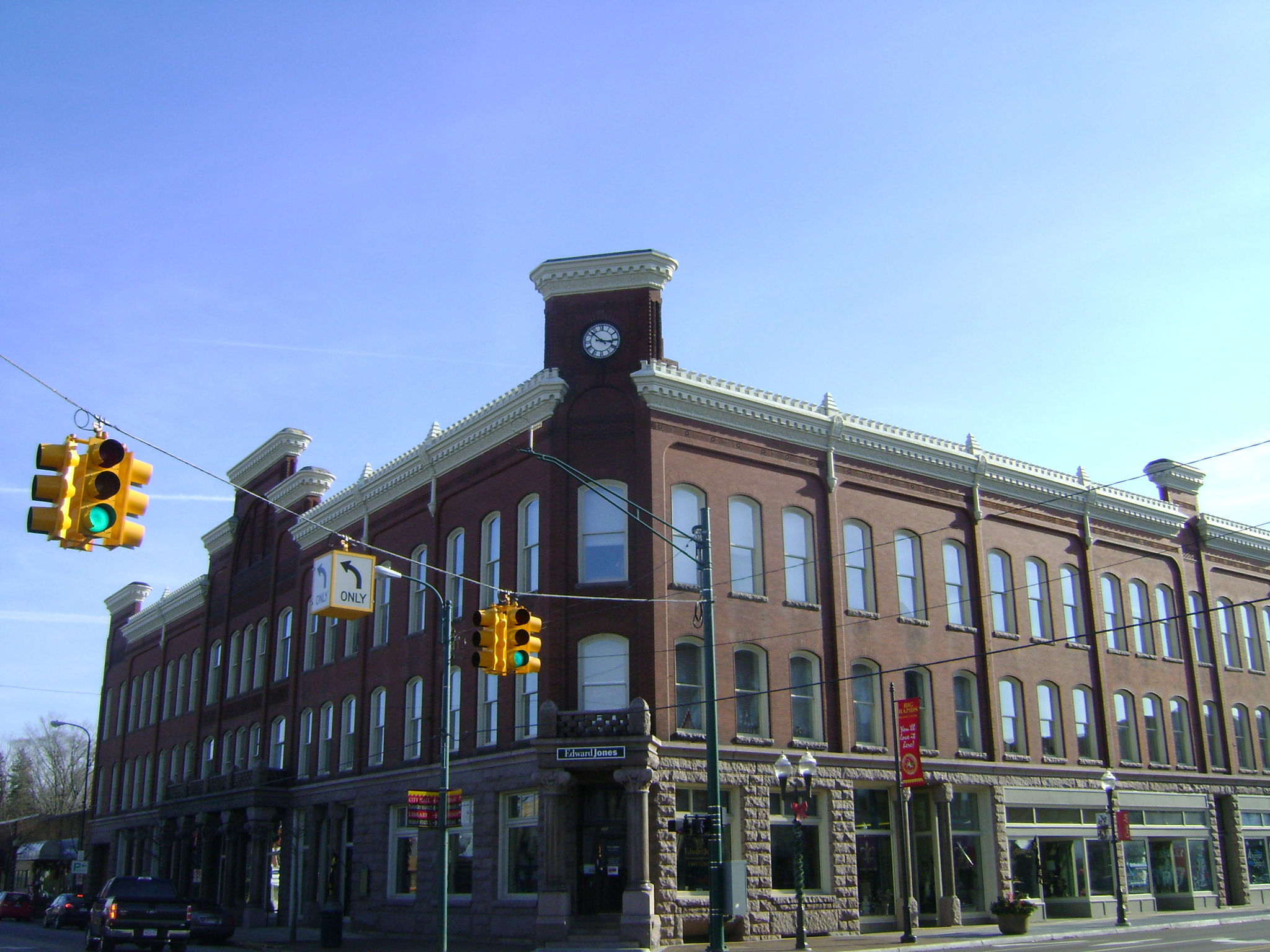
- Nisbett Building, senior housing building in Big Rapids.

- Location within the U.S. state of Michigan
- Coordinates: 43°38′N 85°19′W
- Country: United States
- State: Michigan
- Founded: April 1, 1840; organized February 11, 1859
- Named for: Mecosta
- Seat: Big Rapids
- Largest city: Big Rapids

Area
  - Total: 571 sq mi (1,480 km^{2})
  - Land: 555 sq mi (1,440 km^{2})
  - Water: 16 sq mi (41 km^{2}) 2.8%

Population (2020)
  - Total: 39,714
  - Estimate (2025): 42,320 ▲
  - Density: 75.6/sq mi (29.2/km^{2})
- Time zone: UTC−5 (Eastern)
  - Summer (DST): UTC−4 (EDT)
- Congressional district: 2nd
- Website: mecostacounty.org

Mecosta County (/məˈkɒstə/ mə-KOSS-tə) is a county located in the U.S. state of Michigan. As of the 2020 Census, the population was 39,714. The county seat is Big Rapids.

The county is named after Chief Mecosta, the leader of the Potawatomi Native American tribe who once traveled the local waterways in search of fish and game. Chief Mecosta was one of the signers the Treaty of Washington in 1836. The easily navigated waterways soon led to a boom in lumber industry growth. Workers settled the area in 1851, and the county was officially settled and the government officially organized in 1859. Mecosta County is home to over 100 lakes, rivers, and streams with the Muskegon River winding its way through the county seat and largest city Big Rapids (originally named Leonard). Mecosta County is also home to Ferris State University.

Mecosta County was set off on April 1, 1840, but remained attached for administrative purposes to Kent County until 1857, when it was attached to Newaygo County. The county government was organized on February 11, 1859, with the village of Leonard as its seat.

Mecosta County comprises the Big Rapids, MI, Micropolitan Statistical Area and is included in the Grand Rapids-Wyoming-Muskegon, MI, Combined Statistical Area.

== History ==
The surveyor general approved the United States survey of Mecosta County on February 22, 1839, and the state legislature established the county boundaries on April 1, 1840.

In 1852, John Davis purchased 160 acres (0.65 km^{2}) in Mecosta Township and John Parish purchased 57 acres (230,000 m^{2}) in Big Rapids. They were the first two permanent county residents. On July 20, 1852, the first family to reside in the county, William and Margaret Brockway and their two children, moved into a logging shanty on Mitchell Creek. On February 12, 1853, Alice Victoria Brockway was born to the couple. Alice was the first white child born in the county. In the spring of 1853, the Brockways moved to a 200-acre (0.81 km^{2}) farm in Aetna Township.

In March 1854, Zerah and George French and nine members of their family moved to a shanty close to Mitchell Creek and the Muskegon River. Zerah and George French are considered the co-founders of Big Rapids. In the spring of 1855, James and Laura Montague and their children became the third family to settle in the county. Their 160-acre (0.65 km^{2}) farm in Green Township was located where 19 Mile Road intersects the west bank of the Muskegon River.

The organization of Leonard (Big Rapids) Township and Green Township was authorized in February 1858. On April 5, 1858, the first township elections were held and Jesse Shaw was elected supervisor of Leonard Township and Jesse A. Barker was elected supervisor of Green Township. On February 11, 1859, the State Legislature authorized the organization of Mecosta County and established the Village of Leonard as the county seat. The first county elections were held on April 4 and these county officials were elected: Orrin Stevens, Clerk and Register of Deeds; Alfred L. Clark, Sheriff; Charles Shafer, Treasurer; Jesse A. Barker, Judge of Probate; and Augustine N. Williams, Surveyor. Mr. William T. Howell of Newaygo was appointed Prosecuting Attorney. On May 2, Luther Cobb and Jesse A. Barker convened the first meeting of the board of supervisors and Jesse A. Barker was chosen chairman. The population of Mecosta County was 671 inhabitants in 1860.

The first issue of the Big Rapids Pioneer, a five-column folio, was printed on April 17, 1862. Charlie Gay was the proprietor, owner, and co-editor with Ceylon C. Fuller. The paper was under the same management for nearly 22 years, and 140 years later, the paper is still being published.

The plat for the Village of Big Rapids was recorded on November 3, 1859, and the plat for French's addition (Glen Elm) was recorded on May 9, 1860. The state legislature authorized the incorporation of the City of Big Rapids in April 1869. The first city elections were held on April 19, 1869, when these officials were elected: George F. Stearns, Mayor; Charlie Gay, Recorder; W. Irving Latimer, Treasurer; and William Van Loo, Supervisor. Mecosta County had 5,642 residents in 1870.

The Grand Rapids and Indiana was the first railroad to enter Mecosta County. In June 1869, the GR&I railroad crossed the Little Muskegon River and the Village of Morley was created. Construction of the next section of track to the Village of Paris started in late July 1869 and the Village of Stanwood came into existence. The GR&I reached the city limits of Big Rapids on June 20, 1870, and the Village of Paris on July 1, 1870. Construction of the GR&I continued for several years until the line reached Petoskey in December 1873.

Early county prisoners were housed in the county sheriff's private house, a local hotel, the Kent County jail, or the Newaygo County jail. In 1862, county residents decided not to erect a county jail. The first county jail was erected in the summer of 1868, situated where the Old Historic Jail built in 1893 is presently located on Stewart Street. Construction for the present county jail was completed in 1965. This jail was renovated in 1986. The Mecosta County Board of Commissioners approved another jail renovation and expansion in 2000 with scheduled completion in 2001.

The 1880 census reported Mecosta County to have a population of 13,973. In the early 1880s, rented county offices were located in two downtown buildings near the corner of Elm and Michigan. In 1883, the Board of Supervisors submitted to the voters the proposition to authorize a two-year tax for the purpose of erecting a county courthouse. County voters passed the courthouse tax issue in April 1884. Construction on the first courthouse began in 1885 and was completed in 1886. A ground-breaking ceremony for the present Mecosta County Building (second courthouse) occurred on April 8, 1969. Construction of the Mecosta County Building was completed in late August 1970 and a dedication ceremony was held on November 7, 1970.

In the early 1900s, water power harnessed by hydroelectric dams became the energy base for the manufacturing of furniture and other wood products. The extraction of bedrock deposits of oil, gas, glacial sand, and gravel soon became important economic activities. Although logging activities dominated early history, health services and education have become more significant and enduring forces in shaping the community. Mecosta County has grown in population through the years to over 42,000 with a wealth of opportunity in industry, education, and small-town country living.

Mecosta County was first settled by African Americans in the 1860s when James Guy obtained 160 acres (0.65 km^{2}) in Wheatland Township, with a deed signed by Abraham Lincoln. The Homestead Act of 1862 allowed each settler 160 acres (0.65 km^{2}), resulting in African Americans owning 1,392 acres (5.63 km^{2}) in the area where Remus sits today. They were woodsmen and farmers who established schools and churches in their community. Referred to as the "Old Settlers", a reunion is held every year in the Remus area to celebrate those who originally settled here.

Woodbridge N. Ferris, who later became a Michigan governor, established Ferris Industrial School in 1884 in Big Rapids. The 600-acre (2.4 km^{2}) school became Ferris Institute, Ferris State College, and is now Ferris State University. Before his death in 1928, Ferris had trained 50,000 students and attained a yearly enrollment of 1,800. As of 2010, enrollment was over 14,000, but has since declined.

The tourist industry within the area has had steady growth and is now an important source of income while development opportunities continue to exist. With Mecosta County's numerous lakes, streams, and rivers opportunities for water and fishing activities are limitless: golf courses, bike trails, and other outdoor experiences.

=== Ice Mountain bottling plant ===
In 2009, Michigan Citizens for Water Conservation won their controversial case, The Michigan Citizens for Water Conservation v Nestle Waters North America, which had begun in 1999. The Nestle/Perrier/Great Spring Waters of America/Ice Mountain bottling plant in Stanwood, Mecosta County, began production on May 23, 2002, extracting groundwater from the Muskegon aquifer that qualifies as a source of “spring water” under federal law. The case has the potential of being one of the most important cases in terms of influencing and defining Michigan's water law jurisprudence. The decision involves the interpretation and application of the common law and several environmental statutes, mainly the Michigan Environmental Protection Act, the Inland Lakes and Streams Act, and the Wetland Protection Act. Citizens, disappointed by the inaction of the Michigan Department for Environmental Quality (MDEQ) and their disinclination to adequately monitor the bottling plant, had formed their own organization to conserve Michigan's water. For example, in 2003, the MDEQ, although they had determined that the bottling plant had already had a "measurable impact on certain waters and wetlands". MDEQ argued that "water levels in the impacted waters" in 2003 were at the "highest levels they have been in three years, thereby mitigating concern over possible imminent harm associated with Nestlé’s continued operation at a reduced rate of 250 gallons per minute (gpm) averaged over a monthly time period." In 2009, an out-of-court settlement was reached. "Nestle/Ice Mountain’s water pumping permit was reduced by almost half. Nestlé agreed to lower its spring pumping in Mecosta earlier in the spring during fish spawning and continue low pumping during the summer months to protect the already stressed stream and lake."

== Geography ==
According to the U.S. Census Bureau, the county has a total area of 571 square miles (1,480 km^{2}), of which 555 square miles (1,440 km^{2}) is land and 16 square miles (41 km^{2}) (2.8%) is covered by water.

=== National protected area ===
- Manistee National Forest (part)

=== Adjacent counties ===
- Osceola County (north)
- Lake County (northwest)
- Clare County (northeast)
- Isabella County (east)
- Montcalm County (south & southeast)
- Newaygo County (west & southwest)

== Demographics ==
Historical population
| Census | Pop. | Note | %± |
|---|---|---|---|
| 1860 | 970 | | — |
| 1870 | 5,642 | | 481.6% |
| 1880 | 13,973 | | 147.7% |
| 1890 | 19,697 | | 41.0% |
| 1900 | 20,693 | | 5.1% |
| 1910 | 19,466 | | −5.9% |
| 1920 | 17,765 | | −8.7% |
| 1930 | 15,738 | | −11.4% |
| 1940 | 16,902 | | 7.4% |
| 1950 | 18,968 | | 12.2% |
| 1960 | 21,051 | | 11.0% |
| 1970 | 27,992 | | 33.0% |
| 1980 | 36,961 | | 32.0% |
| 1990 | 37,308 | | 0.9% |
| 2000 | 40,553 | | 8.7% |
| 2010 | 42,798 | | 5.5% |
| 2020 | 39,714 | | −7.2% |
| 2025 (est.) | 42,320 | ▲ | 6.6% |
U.S. Decennial Census; 1790-1960 1900-1990; 1990-2000 2010-2020

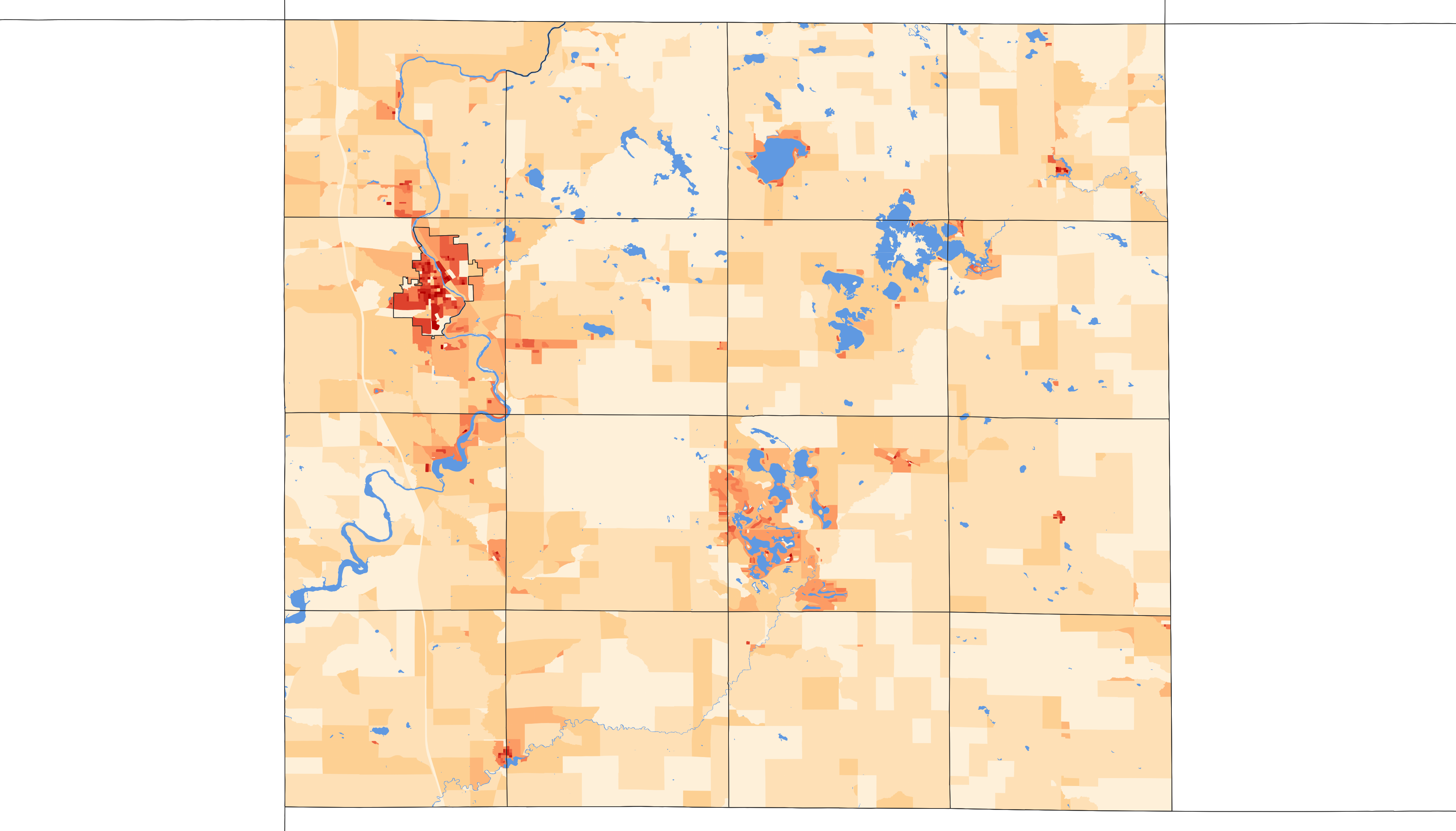
2020 population density of Mecosta County MI by census block

=== Racial and ethnic composition ===
Mecosta County, Michigan – Racial and ethnic composition Note: the US Census treats Hispanic/Latino as an ethnic category. This table excludes Latinos from the racial categories and assigns them to a separate category. Hispanics/Latinos may be of any race.
| Race / Ethnicity (NH = Non-Hispanic) | Pop 1980 | Pop 1990 | Pop 2000 | Pop 2010 | Pop 2020 | % 1980 | % 1990 | % 2000 | % 2010 | % 2020 |
|---|---|---|---|---|---|---|---|---|---|---|
| White alone (NH) | 35,625 | 35,497 | 37,259 | 39,633 | 35,521 | 96.39% | 95.15% | 91.88% | 92.60% | 89.44% |
| Black or African American alone (NH) | 779 | 968 | 1,450 | 1,055 | 772 | 2.11% | 2.59% | 3.58% | 2.47% | 1.94% |
| Native American or Alaska Native alone (NH) | 154 | 247 | 247 | 240 | 190 | 0.42% | 0.66% | 0.61% | 0.56% | 0.48% |
| Asian alone (NH) | 120 | 183 | 346 | 277 | 312 | 0.32% | 0.49% | 0.85% | 0.65% | 0.79% |
| Native Hawaiian or Pacific Islander alone (NH) | x | x | 15 | 7 | 14 | x | x | 0.04% | 0.02% | 0.04% |
| Other race alone (NH) | 81 | 24 | 45 | 33 | 118 | 0.22% | 0.06% | 0.11% | 0.08% | 0.30% |
| Mixed race or Multiracial (NH) | x | x | 671 | 822 | 1,761 | x | x | 1.65% | 1.92% | 4.43% |
| Hispanic or Latino (any race) | 202 | 389 | 520 | 731 | 1,026 | 0.55% | 1.04% | 1.28% | 1.71% | 2.58% |
| Total | 36,961 | 37,308 | 40,553 | 42,798 | 39,714 | 100.00% | 100.00% | 100.00% | 100.00% | 100.00% |

=== 2020 census ===
As of the 2020 census, the county had a population of 39,714 and a median age of 40.0 years; 20.1% of residents were under the age of 18 and 20.7% were 65 years of age or older. For every 100 females there were 97.1 males, and for every 100 females age 18 and over there were 95.7 males age 18 and over.

The racial makeup of the county was 90.4% White, 2.0% Black or African American, 0.6% American Indian and Alaska Native, 0.8% Asian, <0.1% Native Hawaiian and Pacific Islander, 0.8% from some other race, and 5.4% from two or more races. Hispanic or Latino residents of any race comprised 2.6% of the population.

25.5% of residents lived in urban areas, while 74.5% lived in rural areas.

There were 16,013 households in the county, of which 25.1% had children under the age of 18 living in them. Of all households, 47.3% were married-couple households, 19.6% were households with a male householder and no spouse or partner present, and 25.0% were households with a female householder and no spouse or partner present. About 29.3% of all households were made up of individuals and 12.8% had someone living alone who was 65 years of age or older.

There were 20,884 housing units, of which 23.3% were vacant. Among occupied housing units, 73.7% were owner-occupied and 26.3% were renter-occupied. The homeowner vacancy rate was 1.7% and the rental vacancy rate was 12.7%.

=== 2000 census ===
As of the 2000 census, 40,553 people, 14,915 households, and 9,888 families resided in the county. The population density was 73 people per square mile (28 people/km^{2}). The 19,593 housing units averaged 35 per square mile (14/km^{2}).

The racial makeup of the county was 92.68% White, 3.60% Black or African American, 0.64% Native American, 0.87% Asian, 0.04% Pacific Islander, 0.37% from other races, and 1.79% from two or more races.

About 1.28% of the population were Hispanic or Latino, of any race; 25.5% were of German, 20.6% English, 9.2% Irish, and 5.3% Polish ancestry according to the 2010 American Community Survey. 95.9% spoke only English, while 1.7% spoke Spanish and 1.1% German at home.

Of the 14,915 households, 29.10% had children under the age of 18 living with them, 53.30% were married couples living together, 9.30% had a female householder with no husband present, and 33.70% were not families. About 24.50% of all households were made up of individuals, and 8.90% had someone living alone who was 65 years of age or older. The average household size was 2.49 and the average family size was 2.95.

In the county, the population was distributed as 22.50% under the age of 18, 19.80% from 18 to 24, 23.00% from 25 to 44, 21.50% from 45 to 64, and 13.20% who were 65 years of age or older. The median age was 32 years. For every 100 females, there were 102.8 males. For every 100 females age 18 and over, there were 102.2 males.

The median income for a household in the county was $33,849, and for a family was $40,465. Males had a median income of $32,127 versus $22,467 for females. The per capita income for the county was $16,372. About 9.6% of families and 16.1% of the population were below the poverty line, including 16.6% of those under age 18 and 7.6% of those age 65 or over.

== Transportation ==
=== Bus service ===
- MOTA
- Dial-a-Ride

=== Highways ===
- US 131
- Bus. US 131
- M-20
- M-66

=== County designated highways ===
- B-96

== Economy ==
Major employers in the county include:

- Ferris State University, Big Rapids
- Haworth, Big Rapids
- Spectrum Health, Big Rapids
- Wolverine Worldwide, Big Rapids

== Government ==
United States presidential election results for Mecosta County, Michigan
| Year | Republican | | Democratic | | Third party(ies) | |
| Year | No. | % | No. | % | No. | % |
|---|---|---|---|---|---|---|
| 1884 | 2,365 | 53.76% | 1,847 | 41.99% | 187 | 4.25% |
| 1888 | 2,604 | 54.94% | 1,793 | 37.83% | 343 | 7.24% |
| 1892 | 1,970 | 51.76% | 1,484 | 38.99% | 352 | 9.25% |
| 1896 | 2,887 | 57.80% | 1,975 | 39.54% | 133 | 2.66% |
| 1900 | 2,802 | 65.44% | 1,375 | 32.11% | 105 | 2.45% |
| 1904 | 3,313 | 75.90% | 898 | 20.57% | 154 | 3.53% |
| 1908 | 2,723 | 65.84% | 1,179 | 28.51% | 234 | 5.66% |
| 1912 | 1,059 | 26.84% | 958 | 24.28% | 1,928 | 48.87% |
| 1916 | 2,455 | 57.37% | 1,478 | 34.54% | 346 | 8.09% |
| 1920 | 3,932 | 74.78% | 1,145 | 21.78% | 181 | 3.44% |
| 1924 | 3,884 | 76.96% | 794 | 15.73% | 369 | 7.31% |
| 1928 | 4,422 | 80.94% | 1,004 | 18.38% | 37 | 0.68% |
| 1932 | 3,336 | 50.28% | 3,152 | 47.51% | 147 | 2.22% |
| 1936 | 3,176 | 50.09% | 2,621 | 41.33% | 544 | 8.58% |
| 1940 | 4,759 | 68.65% | 2,153 | 31.06% | 20 | 0.29% |
| 1944 | 4,217 | 70.34% | 1,708 | 28.49% | 70 | 1.17% |
| 1948 | 3,803 | 68.44% | 1,572 | 28.29% | 182 | 3.28% |
| 1952 | 5,436 | 76.54% | 1,587 | 22.35% | 79 | 1.11% |
| 1956 | 5,492 | 75.45% | 1,768 | 24.29% | 19 | 0.26% |
| 1960 | 5,306 | 68.88% | 2,380 | 30.90% | 17 | 0.22% |
| 1964 | 3,454 | 44.99% | 4,214 | 54.89% | 9 | 0.12% |
| 1968 | 5,053 | 59.97% | 2,738 | 32.49% | 635 | 7.54% |
| 1972 | 7,158 | 64.29% | 3,799 | 34.12% | 177 | 1.59% |
| 1976 | 7,287 | 59.63% | 4,725 | 38.66% | 209 | 1.71% |
| 1980 | 7,754 | 53.37% | 5,228 | 35.99% | 1,546 | 10.64% |
| 1984 | 9,023 | 68.66% | 4,048 | 30.80% | 71 | 0.54% |
| 1988 | 8,181 | 63.02% | 4,736 | 36.48% | 64 | 0.49% |
| 1992 | 6,047 | 38.19% | 6,097 | 38.50% | 3,691 | 23.31% |
| 1996 | 5,289 | 40.30% | 6,370 | 48.54% | 1,465 | 11.16% |
| 2000 | 8,072 | 54.71% | 6,300 | 42.70% | 382 | 2.59% |
| 2004 | 9,710 | 55.23% | 7,730 | 43.97% | 141 | 0.80% |
| 2008 | 9,238 | 49.41% | 9,101 | 48.68% | 358 | 1.91% |
| 2012 | 9,176 | 54.04% | 7,515 | 44.26% | 289 | 1.70% |
| 2016 | 10,305 | 59.71% | 5,827 | 33.76% | 1,127 | 6.53% |
| 2020 | 13,267 | 62.93% | 7,375 | 34.98% | 439 | 2.08% |
| 2024 | 14,445 | 64.23% | 7,688 | 34.19% | 356 | 1.58% |

United States Senate election results for Mecosta County, Michigan1
| Year | Republican | | Democratic | | Third party(ies) | |
| Year | No. | % | No. | % | No. | % |
|---|---|---|---|---|---|---|
| 2024 | 13,950 | 62.95% | 7,462 | 33.67% | 747 | 3.37% |

Michigan Gubernatorial election results for Mecosta County
| Year | Republican | | Democratic | | Third party(ies) | |
| Year | No. | % | No. | % | No. | % |
|---|---|---|---|---|---|---|
| 2022 | 10,262 | 58.61% | 6,867 | 39.22% | 381 | 2.18% |

The county government operates the jail, maintains rural roads, operates the major local courts, keeps files of deeds and mortgages, maintains vital records, administers public health regulations, and participates with the state in the provision of welfare and other social services. The county board of commissioners controls the budget, but has only limited authority to make laws or ordinances. In Michigan, most local government functions — police and fire, building and zoning, tax assessment, street maintenance, etc. — are the responsibility of individual cities and townships.

=== Elected officials ===
- Prosecuting Attorney: Amy Clapp
- Sheriff: Brian Miller
- County Clerk: Marcee Purcell
- County Treasurer: Sherry Earnest
- Register of Deeds: Karen Hahn
- Drain Commissioner: Jackie Fitzgerald
- Road Commissioners: John R. Currie; Paul Jefts; Randy Maxwell
- 49th Circuit Court Judges: Hon. Scott Hill-Kennedy; Hon. Kimberly Booher
- 77th District Court Judge: Hon. Peter Jakelvic

(information as of August 2016)

== Communities ==
=== City ===
- Big Rapids (county seat)

=== Villages ===
- Barryton
- Mecosta
- Morley
- Stanwood

=== Census-designated places ===
- Canadian Lakes
- Paris

=== Unincorporated communities ===
- Altona
- Chippewa Lake
- Millbrook
- Remus
- Rodney
- Sylvester
- West Millbrook

=== Townships ===
- Aetna Township
- Austin Township
- Big Rapids Charter Township
- Chippewa Township
- Colfax Township
- Deerfield Township
- Fork Township
- Grant Township
- Green Charter Township
- Hinton Township
- Martiny Township
- Mecosta Township
- Millbrook Township
- Morton Township
- Sheridan Township
- Wheatland Township

== Education ==
The Mecosta–Osceola Intermediate School District, based in Big Rapids, services the districts in the county. The intermediate school district offers regional special education services, a residential at-risk youth center, and technical career programs for its students.

Mecosta County is served by the following regular public school districts:

- Big Rapids Public Schools
- Chippewa Hills School District
- Morley Stanwood Community Schools

The county also has one charter school, Crossroads Charter Academy.

Mecosta County has the following private schools:

- Brockway Christian Academy (Methodist)
- St. Mary Catholic School (Catholic)
- St. Michael Elementary School (Catholic)
- St. Peters Lutheran School (Lutheran)

== See also ==
- List of Michigan State Historic Sites in Mecosta County
- National Register of Historic Places listings in Mecosta County, Michigan
