= Wheatland Township, Mecosta County, Michigan =

Wheatland Township, Michigan
- Township
- Location within Michigan Location within the United States
- Coordinates: 43°35′50″N 85°8′47″W
- Country: United States
- State: Michigan
- County: Mecosta

Area
  - Total: 35.7 sq mi (92 km^{2})
  - Land: 35.5 sq mi (92 km^{2})
  - Water: 0.2 sq mi (0.52 km^{2})
- Elevation: 1,024 ft (312 m)

Population (2020)
  - Total: 1,396
  - Density: 39.3/sq mi (15.2/km^{2})
- Time zone: UTC-5 (Eastern (EST))
  - Summer (DST): UTC-4 (EDT)
- ZIP codes: 49340 (Remus); 49310 (Blanchard); 49332 (Mecosta)
- FIPS code: 26-107-86560
- GNIS feature ID: 1627256

Wheatland Township is a civil township of Mecosta County in the U.S. state of Michigan. The population was 1,396 at the 2020 census.

== Communities ==
- Remus is an unincorporated community near the center of the township at 43°35′48″N 85°08′41″W It was at first called Bingen, and was located about 3 miles (5 km) west of the current site, where there was a sawmill and several other buildings. Settlement moved to the present site in 1869 to be on the Detroit, Lansing and Northern Railroad line. A post office named Bingen was established on July 20, 1877, with Christian W. Wernette as the first postmaster. The office was renamed Remus on March 15, 1880, after William John Remus, a landowner who had surveyed the area. The Remus ZIP code 49340 serves most of Wheatland Township, as well as a large portion of Sheridan Township to the north, a small area of Millbrook Township to the south, and portions of Sherman Township, Broomfield Township, and Fremont Township to the east in Isabella County.

== Geography ==
The township is in eastern Mecosta County, bordered to the east by Isabella County. According to the United States Census Bureau, the township has a total area of 35.7 square miles (92 km^{2}), of which 35.5 square miles (92 km^{2}) are land and 0.2 square miles (0.5 km^{2}), or 0.56%, are water.

== Demographics ==
As of the census of 2000, there were 1,474 people, 566 households, and 395 families residing in the township. The population density was 41.5 inhabitants per square mile (16.0/km^{2}). There were 654 housing units at an average density of 18.4 per square mile (7.1/km^{2}). The racial makeup of the township was 94.98% White, 1.42% African American, 1.02% Native American, 0.68% from other races, and 1.90% from two or more races. Hispanic or Latino of any race were 1.22% of the population.

There were 566 households, out of which 31.6% had children under the age of 18 living with them, 57.6% were married couples living together, 8.5% had a female householder with no husband present, and 30.2% were non-families. 25.6% of all households were made up of individuals, and 12.5% had someone living alone who was 65 years of age or older. The average household size was 2.59 and the average family size was 3.11.

In the township the population was spread out, with 28.4% under the age of 18, 7.4% from 18 to 24, 24.9% from 25 to 44, 25.7% from 45 to 64, and 13.6% who were 65 years of age or older. The median age was 38 years. For every 100 females, there were 97.1 males. For every 100 females age 18 and over, there were 93.8 males.

The median income for a household in the township was $33,654, and the median income for a family was $38,229. Males had a median income of $30,296 versus $20,938 for females. The per capita income for the township was $16,405. About 7.7% of families and 11.7% of the population were below the poverty line, including 15.6% of those under age 18 and 8.0% of those age 65 or over.
