= Mecosta, Michigan =

- Village
- Interactive map of Mecosta, Michigan
- Location within Michigan Location within the United States
- Coordinates: 43.618108°N 85.229964°W
- Country: United States
- State: Michigan
- County: Mecosta
- Township: Morton
- Incorporated: 1883

Area
  - Total: 1.112 sq mi (2.880 km^{2})
  - Land: 1.112 sq mi (2.880 km^{2})
  - Water: 0 sq mi (0.000 km^{2}) 0.0%
- Elevation: 971 ft (296 m)

Population (2020)
  - Total: 386
  - Estimate (2024): 475
  - Density: 347/sq mi (134/km^{2})
- Time zone: UTC−5 (Eastern (EST))
  - Summer (DST): UTC−4 (EDT)
- ZIP Code: 49332
- Area code: 231
- FIPS code: 26-52760
- GNIS feature ID: 2399303
- Website: villageofmecosta.org

Mecosta is a village in Mecosta County, Michigan, United States. The population was 386 at the 2020 census, and was estimated at 475 in 2024.

The village is within Morton Township. Mecosta Township, which is also in Mecosta County, is located several miles to the west.

== Geography ==
The village is in central Mecosta County, in the northeast part of Morton Township. State highway M-20 passes through the village, leading northwest 17 miles (27 km) to Big Rapids, the county seat, and east 24 miles (39 km) to Mount Pleasant.

According to the United States Census Bureau, the village has a total area of 1.112 square miles (2.88 km^{2}), all land. The East Branch of the Little Muskegon River flows southwest through the center of the village, part of the Muskegon River watershed leading to Lake Michigan.

== Demographics ==
Historical population
Census	Pop.	Note	%±
1880	189		—
1890	472		149.7%
1900	416		−11.9%
1910	352		−15.4%
1920	297		−15.6%
1930	262		−11.8%
1940	254		−3.1%
1950	305		20.1%
1960	303		−0.7%
1970	396		30.7%
1980	428		8.1%
1990	393		−8.2%
2000	440		12.0%
2010	457		3.9%
2020	386		−15.5%
2024 (est.)	475	▲	23.1%
U.S. Decennial Census; 2020 Census

=== 2010 census ===
As of the 2010 census, there were 457 people, 166 households, and 122 families living in the village. The population density was 408.0 inhabitants per square mile (157.5/km^{2}). There were 203 housing units at an average density of 181.2 per square mile (70.0/km^{2}). The racial makeup of the village was 88.6% White, 2.0% African American, 0.9% Native American, 0.4% Pacific Islander, 1.3% from other races, and 6.8% from two or more races. Hispanic or Latino of any race were 3.1% of the population.

There were 166 households, of which 40.4% had children under the age of 18 living with them, 45.8% were married couples living together, 22.9% had a female householder with no husband present, 4.8% had a male householder with no wife present, and 26.5% were non-families. 19.3% of all households were made up of individuals, and 6.6% had someone living alone who was 65 years of age or older. The average household size was 2.75 and the average family size was 3.16.

The median age in the village was 33.6 years. 30.9% of residents were under the age of 18; 7.6% were between the ages of 18 and 24; 26.1% were from 25 to 44; 23.9% were from 45 to 64; and 11.6% were 65 years of age or older. The gender makeup of the village was 51.0% male and 49.0% female.

=== 2000 census ===
As of the 2000 census, there were 440 people, 167 households, and 112 families living in the village. The population density was 384.7 inhabitants per square mile (148.5/km^{2}). There were 200 housing units at an average density of 174.8 per square mile (67.5/km^{2}). The racial makeup of the village was 88.18% White, 2.27% African American, 0.45% Native American, 1.36% from other races, and 7.73% from two or more races. Hispanic or Latino of any race were 2.73% of the population.

There were 167 households, out of which 34.1% had children under the age of 18 living with them, 38.9% were married couples living together, 19.2% had a female householder with no husband present, and 32.9% were non-families. 28.1% of all households were made up of individuals, and 13.8% had someone living alone who was 65 years of age or older. The average household size was 2.63 and the average family size was 3.13.

In the village, the population was spread out, with 31.6% under the age of 18, 10.5% from 18 to 24, 24.8% from 25 to 44, 18.9% from 45 to 64, and 14.3% who were 65 years of age or older. The median age was 33 years. For every 100 females, there were 111.5 males. For every 100 females age 18 and over, there were 96.7 males.

The median income for a household in the village was $32,857, and the median income for a family was $30,208. Males had a median income of $28,125 versus $22,500 for females. The per capita income for the village was $14,620. About 17.3% of families and 17.9% of the population were below the poverty line, including 27.0% of those under age 18 and 12.1% of those age 65 or over.

== Notable people ==
Mecosta was home to American political theorist, historian, social critic, literary critic, and fiction author Russell Kirk. Kirk resided at Piety Hill, currently the location of the Russell Kirk Center for Cultural Renewal.
