= Big Rapids, Michigan =

- City
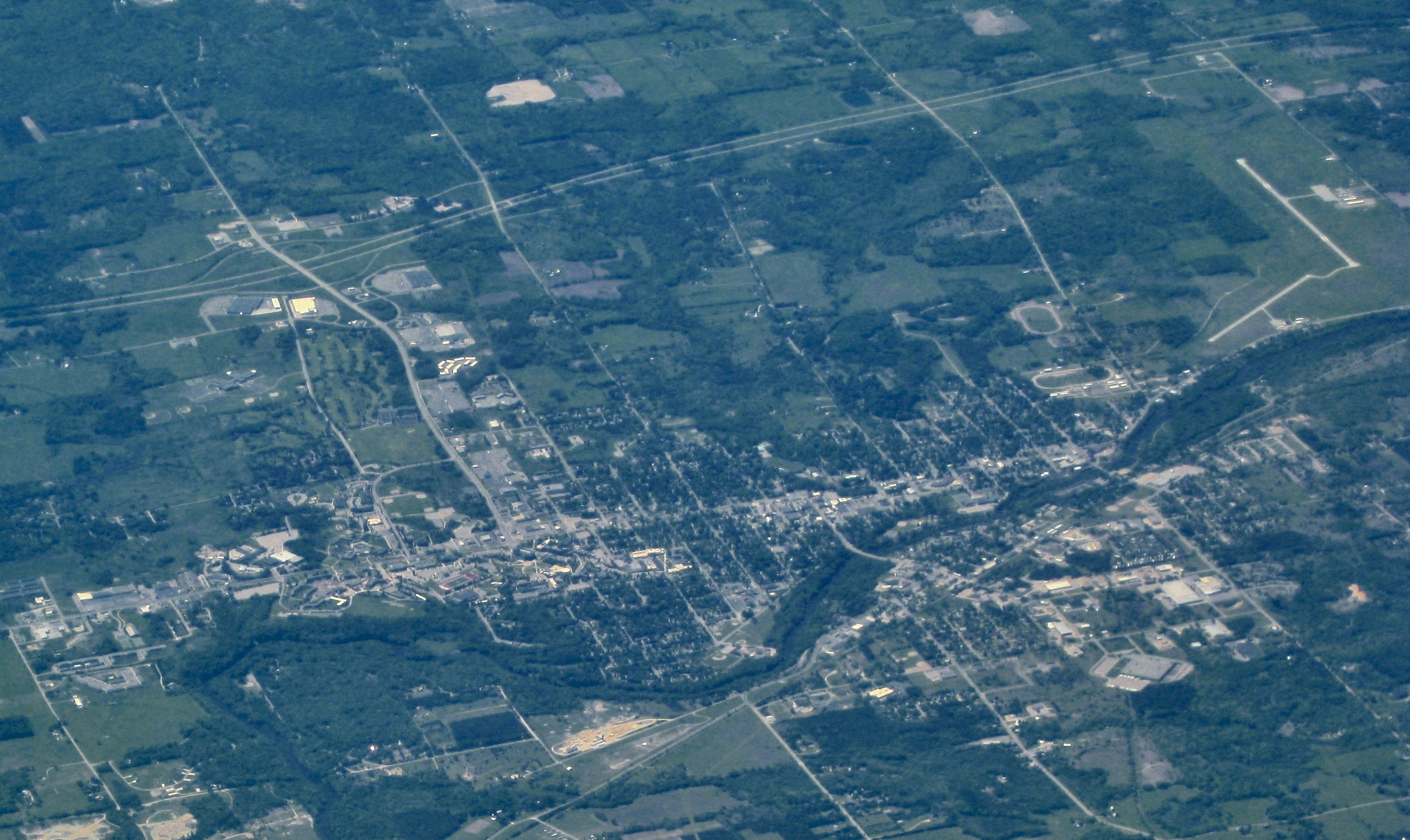
- Aerial photograph of Big Rapids in 2009
- Nickname: "B.R."
- Interactive map of Big Rapids, Michigan
- Location within Michigan Location within the United States
- Coordinates: 43.6997°N 85.4813°W
- Country: United States
- State: Michigan
- County: Mecosta
- Founded: 1855
- Incorporated: 1869

Government
  - Type: Mayor–council
  - Mayor: Fred Guenther

Area
  - City: 4.562 sq mi (11.816 km^{2})
  - Land: 4.445 sq mi (11.513 km^{2})
  - Water: 0.117 sq mi (0.304 km^{2}) 2.56%
- Elevation: 928 ft (283 m)

Population (2020)
  - City: 7,727
  - Estimate (2024): 8,565
  - Density: 1,738/sq mi (671.2/km^{2})
  - Urban: 10,136
  - Metro: 42,320 (US: 296th)
- Time zone: UTC−5 (Eastern (EST))
  - Summer (DST): UTC−4 (EDT)
- ZIP Code: 49307
- Area code: 231
- FIPS code: 26-08300
- GNIS feature ID: 1625934
- Website: cityofbr.org

Big Rapids is a city and the seat of government of Mecosta County, Michigan, United States. The population was 7,727 at the 2020 census, and was estimated at 8,565 in 2024, The city is surrounded by Big Rapids Charter Township but they are completely separate jurisdictions. Big Rapids is home of the main campus of Ferris State University, a four-year public university.

== History ==
Big Rapids was settled in 1855 by brothers George and Zera French. As the village of Leonard, at the intersection of Elm and Stewart streets, it became the seat of Mecosta County on February 11, 1859, but local lumbermen knew the site as Big Rapids. On September 29, 1859, the Leonard post office was renamed Big Rapids. Big Rapids was platted on November 3, 1859, surrounding the courthouse site of Leonard. The unincorporated community of Big Rapids was first cited on June 10, 1861, rather than Leonard, when the Mecosta County board of supervisors mentioned their seat of government, and in 1865 was consistently cited throughout the year. Big Rapids was incorporated as a city in 1869.

== Geography ==
According to the United States Census Bureau, the city has a total area of 4.562 square miles (11.82 km^{2}), of which 4.445 square miles (11.51 km^{2}) is land and 0.117 square miles (0.30 km^{2}) (2.56%) is water.

Big Rapids is in northwestern Mecosta County in central Michigan. It is 56 miles (90 km) north of Grand Rapids and 42 miles (68 km) south of Cadillac, both via Highway 131. The city sits along the Muskegon River, which passes Ferris State University and the local middle school on its way southwest to Lake Michigan. As with most of the area, Big Rapids lies on an ancient seabed and has a sandy subsoil which lies above an iron ore base.

== Government ==
The city levies an income tax of 1 percent on residents and 0.5 percent on nonresidents.

== Transportation ==
=== Major highways ===
- US 131
- Bus. US 131
- M-20
- B-96

=== Bus ===
- Indian Trails provides daily intercity bus service between Grand Rapids and Petoskey, Michigan. The southbound bus stops in Big Rapids at 2:35 pm, and the northbound bus stops in Big Rapids at 6:03 pm.
- Public dial-a-ride bus service is provided by the Big Rapids Dial-A-Ride.

=== Airports ===
- Roben-Hood Airport is located two miles (3.2 km) north of the Big Rapids business district and provides services to businesses and general aviation throughout the Midwest.
- Gerald R. Ford International Airport is the nearest international airport, located roughly one hour south of Big Rapids near Grand Rapids.

=== Cycling and hiking ===
The Fred Meijer White Pine Trail, a 92-mile (148 km) multi-use trail from Grand Rapids to Cadillac, passes through Big Rapids.

== Demographics ==
Historical population
Census	Pop.	Note	%±
1870	1,237		—
1880	3,552		187.1%
1890	5,303		49.3%
1900	4,686		−11.6%
1910	4,519		−3.6%
1920	4,558		0.9%
1930	4,671		2.5%
1940	4,987		6.8%
1950	6,736		35.1%
1960	8,686		28.9%
1970	11,995		38.1%
1980	14,361		19.7%
1990	12,603		−12.2%
2000	10,849		−13.9%
2010	10,601		−2.3%
2020	7,727		−27.1%
2024 (est.)	8,565		10.8%
U.S. Decennial Census; 2020 Census

=== Racial and ethnic composition ===
Big Rapids, Michigan – racial and ethnic composition Note: the US Census treats Hispanic/Latino as an ethnic category. This table excludes Latinos from the racial categories and assigns them to a separate category. Hispanics/Latinos may be of any race.
Race / ethnicity (NH = non-Hispanic)	Pop. 1990	Pop. 2000	Pop. 2010	Pop. 2020	% 1990	% 2000	% 2010	% 2020
White alone (NH)	11,585	8,939	9,169	6,249	91.92%	82.39%	86.49%	80.87%
Black or African American alone (NH)	628	1,147	706	440	4.98%	10.57%	6.66%	5.69%
Native American or Alaska Native alone (NH)	71	69	65	35	0.56%	0.64%	0.61%	0.45%
Asian alone (NH)	115	237	155	157	0.91%	2.18%	1.46%	2.03%
Pacific Islander alone (NH)	—	4	0	6	—	0.04%	0.00%	0.08%
Other race alone (NH)	7	19	11	34	0.06%	0.18%	0.10%	0.44%
Mixed race or multiracial (NH)	—	235	243	455	—	2.17%	2.29%	5.89%
Hispanic or Latino (any race)	197	199	252	351	1.56%	1.83%	2.38%	4.54%
Total	12,603	10,849	10,601	7,727	100.00%	100.00%	100.00%	100.00%

=== Population decline ===
Big Rapids' population peaked in the 1980s. Since the 1980s, Big Rapids has lost over 46% of its population. There are a number of reasons for the decline, one being the decline in enrollment at Ferris State University.

=== 2020 census ===
As of the 2020 census, there were 7,727 people, 2,996 households, and 1,270 families residing in the city. The population density was 1,738.36 inhabitants per square mile (671.2/km^{2}). There were 3,700 housing units at an average density of 832.40 per square mile (321.4/km^{2}).

The median age in the city was 23.7 years. 16.0% of residents were under the age of 18 and 11.0% were 65 years of age or older. For every 100 females, there were 84.9 males. For every 100 females age 18 and over, there were 81.3 males age 18 and over.

99.5% of residents lived in urban areas, while 0.5% lived in rural areas.

Of the 2,996 households, 22.4% had children under the age of 18 living in them. Of all households, 24.6% were married-couple households, 25.9% were households with a male householder and no spouse or partner present, and 40.0% were households with a female householder and no spouse or partner present. About 42.5% of all households were made up of individuals, and 12.6% had someone living alone who was 65 years of age or older.

19.0% of housing units were vacant. The homeowner vacancy rate was 2.2%, and the rental vacancy rate was 15.2%.

=== Demographic estimates ===
As of the 2024 American Community Survey, there were 3,133 estimated households in Big Rapids with an average of 2.06 persons per household. The city has a median household income of $43,858. Approximately 34.1% of the city's population lives at or below the poverty line. Big Rapids has an estimated 62.3% employment rate, with 26.9% of the population holding a bachelor's degree or higher and 94.3% holding a high school diploma. There were 3,610 housing units at an average density of 812.15 per square mile (313.6/km^{2}). The median age in the city was 22.9 years.

According to realtor website Zillow, the average price of a home as of March 31, 2026, in Big Rapids is $215,285.

=== Language ===
The top five reported languages (people were allowed to report up to two languages, thus the figures will generally add to more than 100%) were English (98.2%), Spanish (0.7%), Indo-European (0.4%), Asian and Pacific Islander (0.5%), and Other (0.2%).

=== 2010 census ===
As of the 2010 census, there were 10,601 people, 3,330 households, and 1,323 families residing in the city. The population density was 2,429.19 inhabitants per square mile (937.9/km^{2}). There were 3,623 housing units at an average density of 830.20 per square mile (320.5/km^{2}). The racial makeup of the city was 87.97% White, 6.75% African American, 0.70% Native American, 1.47% Asian, 0.02% Pacific Islander, 0.57% from some other races and 2.52% from two or more races. Hispanic or Latino people of any race were 2.38% of the population.

There were 3,330 households, of which 22.2% had children under the age of 18 living with them, 22.9% were married couples living together, 12.7% had a female householder with no husband present, 4.2% had a male householder with no wife present, and 60.3% were non-families. 36.5% of all households were made up of individuals, and 9.8% had someone living alone who was 65 years of age or older. The average household size was 2.22 and the average family size was 2.88.

The median age in the city was 21.8 years. 12.5% of residents were under the age of 18; 54% were between the ages of 18 and 24; 15.9% were from 25 to 44; 11.2% were from 45 to 64; and 6.5% were 65 years of age or older. The gender makeup of the city was 51.0% male and 49.0% female.

=== 2000 census ===
As of the 2000 census, there were 10,849 people, 3,388 households, and 1,473 families residing in the city. The population density was 2,555.55 inhabitants per square mile (986.7/km^{2}). There were 3,654 housing units at an average density of 860.72 per square mile (332.3/km^{2}). The racial makeup of the city was 83.57% White, 10.63% African American, 0.73% Native American, 2.24% Asian, 0.04% Pacific Islander, 0.50% from some other races and 2.30% from two or more races. Hispanic or Latino people of any race were 1.83% of the population.

There were 3,388 households out of which 25.5% have children under the age of 18 living with them, 26.5% were married couples living together, 14.3% have a female householder with no husband present, and 56.5% were non-families. 35.7% of all households were made up of individuals and 9.8% have someone living alone who was 65 years of age or older. The average household size was 2.26 and the average family size was 2.93.

In the city the population was spread out with 15.2% under the age of 18, 51.0% from 18 to 24, 17.3% from 25 to 44, 9.1% from 45 to 64, and 7.4% who were 65 years of age or older. The median age was 22 years. For every 100 females there were 109.4 males. For every 100 females age 18 and over, there were 110.4 males.

The median income for a household in the city was $20,192, and the median income for a family was $28,629. Males have a median income of $30,341 versus $19,770 for females. The per capita income for the city was $10,719. 35.0% of the population and 19.2% of families were below the poverty line. Out of the total people living in poverty, 29.3% were under the age of 18 and 11.6% were 65 or older.

== Climate ==
This climatic region has large seasonal temperature differences, with warm to hot (and often humid) summers and cold (sometimes severely cold) winters. According to the Köppen Climate Classification system, Big Rapids has a humid continental climate, abbreviated "Dfb" on climate maps.

Climate data for Big Rapids Water Treatment Plant, Michigan (1991–2020 normals, extremes 1896–present)
Month	Jan	Feb	Mar	Apr	May	Jun	Jul	Aug	Sep	Oct	Nov	Dec	Year
Record high °F (°C)	61 (16)	64 (18)	85 (29)	89 (32)	93 (34)	99 (37)	103 (39)	101 (38)	97 (36)	88 (31)	76 (24)	66 (19)	103 (39)
Mean daily maximum °F (°C)	28.2 (−2.1)	31.4 (−0.3)	42.0 (5.6)	54.8 (12.7)	67.6 (19.8)	77.2 (25.1)	81.3 (27.4)	79.0 (26.1)	71.6 (22.0)	58.1 (14.5)	44.1 (6.7)	33.2 (0.7)	55.7 (13.2)
Daily mean °F (°C)	20.4 (−6.4)	21.8 (−5.7)	30.9 (−0.6)	42.9 (6.1)	55.4 (13.0)	65.1 (18.4)	69.2 (20.7)	67.0 (19.4)	59.3 (15.2)	47.2 (8.4)	35.8 (2.1)	26.3 (−3.2)	45.1 (7.3)
Mean daily minimum °F (°C)	12.7 (−10.7)	12.2 (−11.0)	19.8 (−6.8)	30.9 (−0.6)	43.2 (6.2)	53.0 (11.7)	57.1 (13.9)	55.0 (12.8)	46.9 (8.3)	36.3 (2.4)	27.5 (−2.5)	19.3 (−7.1)	34.5 (1.4)
Record low °F (°C)	−30 (−34)	−36 (−38)	−24 (−31)	1 (−17)	20 (−7)	28 (−2)	32 (0)	32 (0)	16 (−9)	10 (−12)	−8 (−22)	−18 (−28)	−36 (−38)
Average precipitation inches (mm)	2.43 (62)	1.97 (50)	2.57 (65)	3.95 (100)	3.76 (96)	3.36 (85)	3.48 (88)	4.24 (108)	3.02 (77)	3.76 (96)	3.05 (77)	2.33 (59)	37.92 (963)
Average snowfall inches (cm)	17.8 (45)	16.0 (41)	7.7 (20)	1.5 (3.8)	0.0 (0.0)	0.0 (0.0)	0.0 (0.0)	0.0 (0.0)	0.0 (0.0)	0.2 (0.51)	3.8 (9.7)	14.3 (36)	61.3 (156)
Average precipitation days (≥ 0.01 in)	16.5	12.9	11.6	13.5	13.0	10.7	10.5	11.3	11.5	14.7	13.7	14.9	154.8
Average snowy days (≥ 0.1 in)	13.8	10.0	5.1	1.4	0.0	0.0	0.0	0.0	0.0	0.2	3.4	9.8	43.7
Source: NOAA

== Notable people ==
- Matt Borland, NASCAR crew chief
- Justin Currie, NFL player; raised in Big Rapids
- May Erlewine, musician
- Ben Hebard Fuller, major general and Commandant of the Marine Corps; born in Big Rapids
- Clint Hurdle, outfielder with four MLB teams; manager of the Colorado Rockies and Pittsburgh Pirates; born in Big Rapids
- James Hynes, novelist; grew up in Big Rapids
- Tom Shanahan, a sportswriter and author; grew up in Big Rapids
- Anna Howard Shaw, a leader of the women's suffrage movement in the nineteenth century; lived in Big Rapids as a young woman
- Daisy Tapley, African American classical singer; born in Big Rapids
- Virginia Van Wie, Women’s Golf Champion, Women’s Golf Hall of Fame, made a home in Big Rapids in her later years

== Education ==
- Big Rapids Public Schools
- Crossroads Charter Academy
- Ferris State University
- St. Peter's Lutheran Church and School
- St. Mary's Catholic School
