= Winn, Michigan =

- Census-designated place (CDP) & unincorporated community
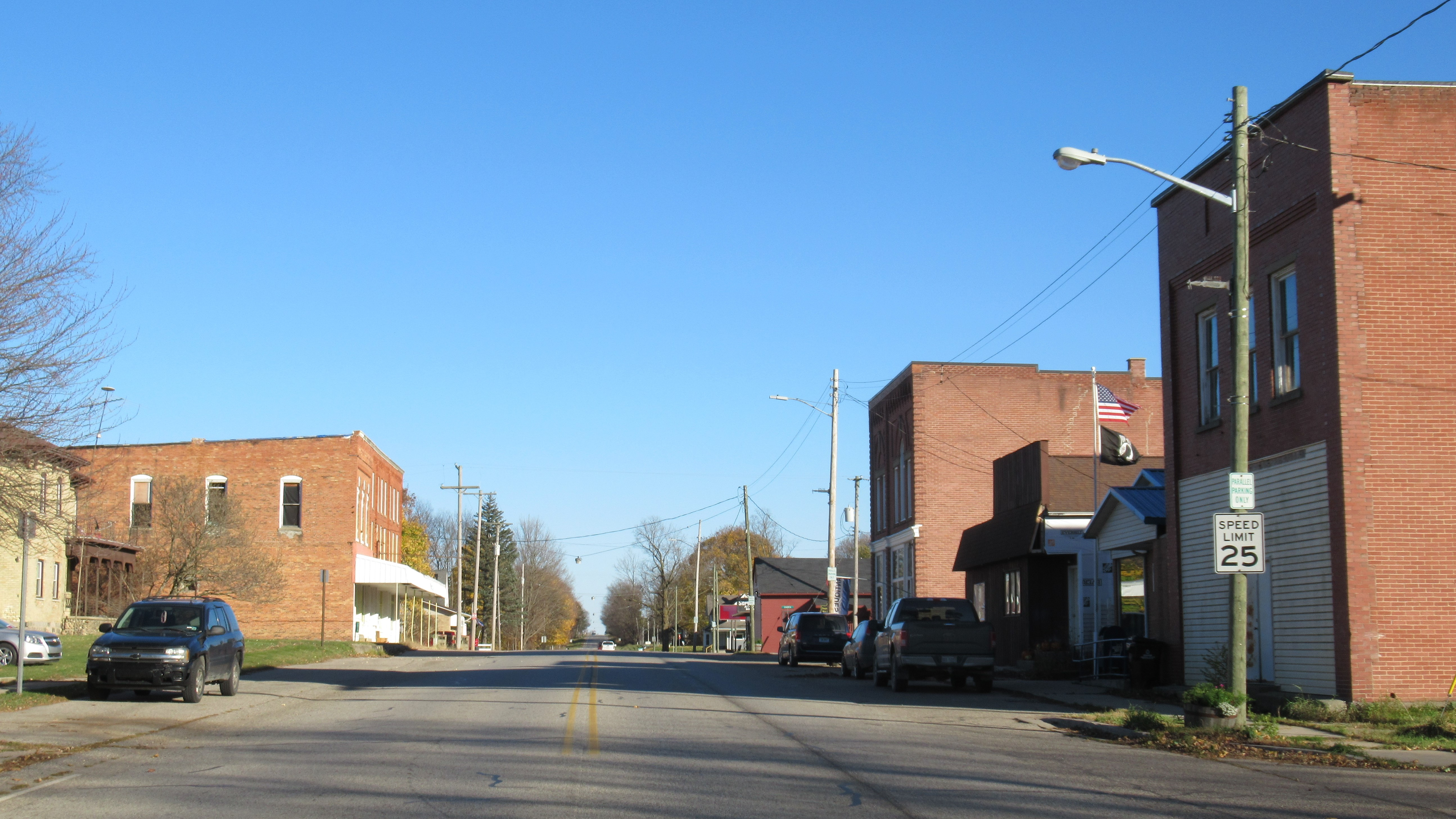
- Looking east along W. Blanchard Road

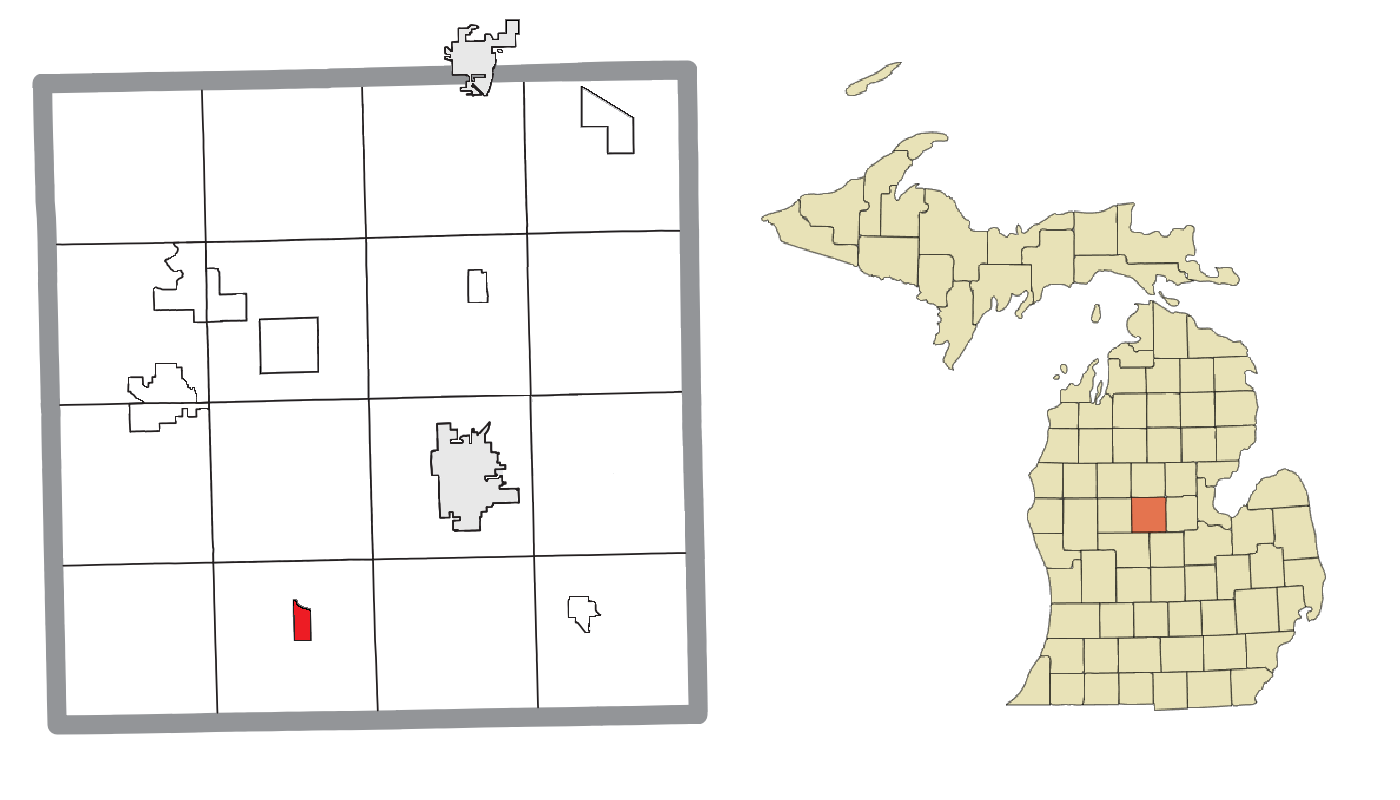
- Location within Isabella County

- Location within the state of Michigan Location within the United States
- Coordinates: 43°31′24″N 84°54′06″W
- Country: United States
- State: Michigan
- County: Isabella
- Township: Fremont
- Settled: 1867
- Platted: 1876

Area
  - Total: 0.57 sq mi (1.48 km^{2})
  - Land: 0.57 sq mi (1.48 km^{2})
  - Water: 0 sq mi (0.00 km^{2})
- Elevation: 869 ft (265 m)

Population (2020)
  - Total: 166
  - Density: 289.7/sq mi (111.9/km^{2})
- Time zone: UTC-5 (Eastern (EST))
  - Summer (DST): UTC-4 (EDT)
- ZIP code(s): 48858 (Mount Pleasant); 48896
- Area code: 989
- GNIS feature ID: 1616636, 2806338

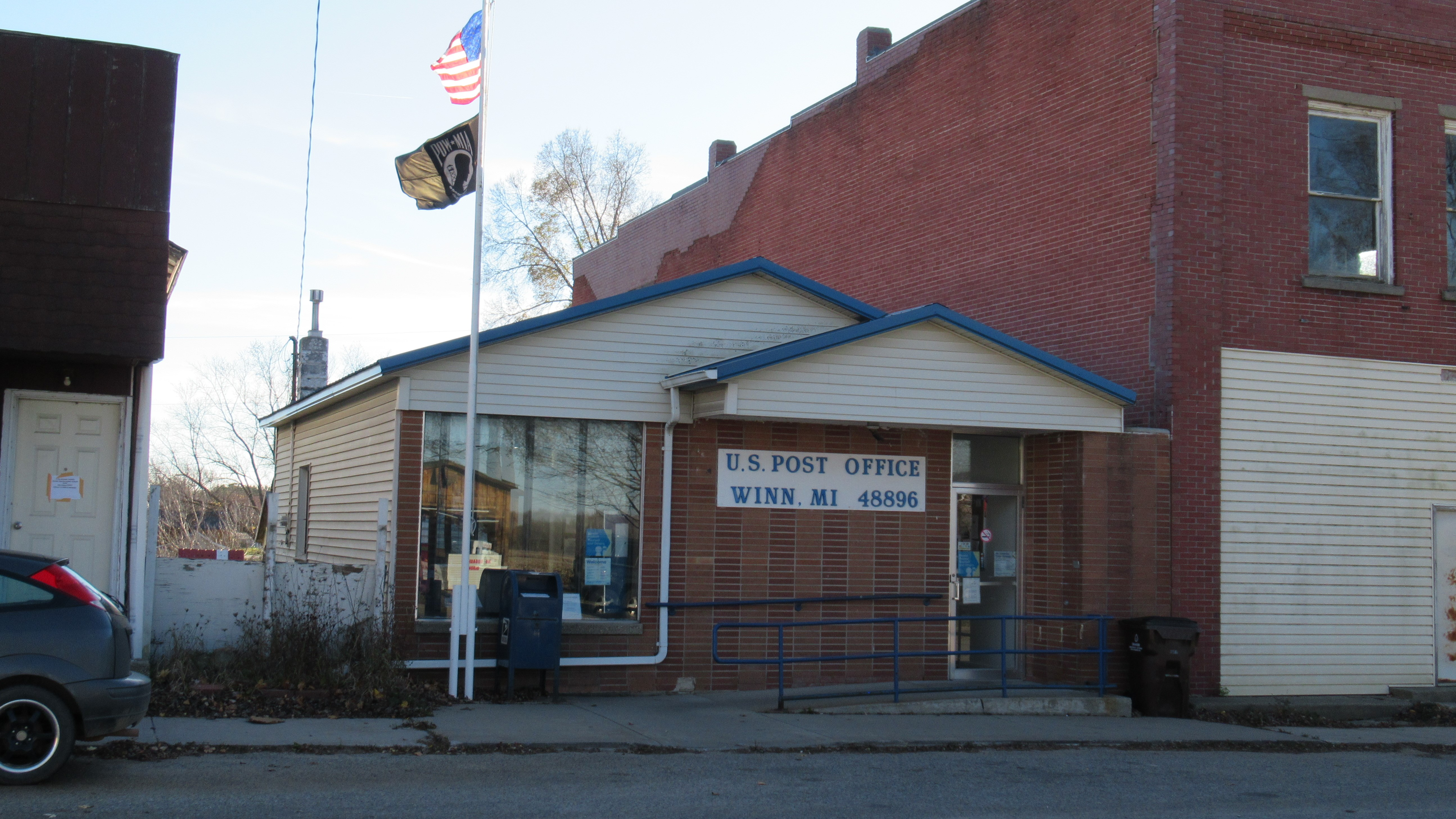
U.S. Post Office in Winn

Winn is an unincorporated community and census-designated place (CDP) in Isabella County in the U.S. state of Michigan. The CDP had a population of 166 at the 2020 census. The community is located within Fremont Township.

As an unincorporated community, Winn has no legal autonomy of its own but does have its own post office with the 48896 ZIP Code.

== History ==
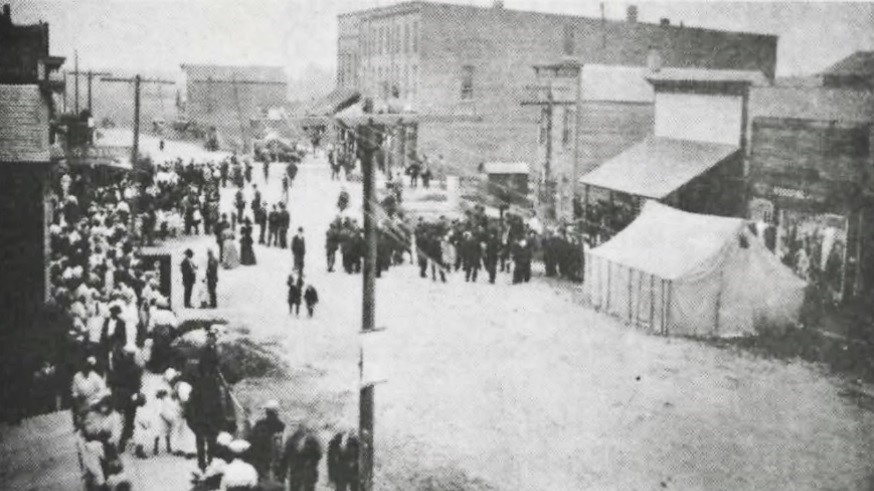
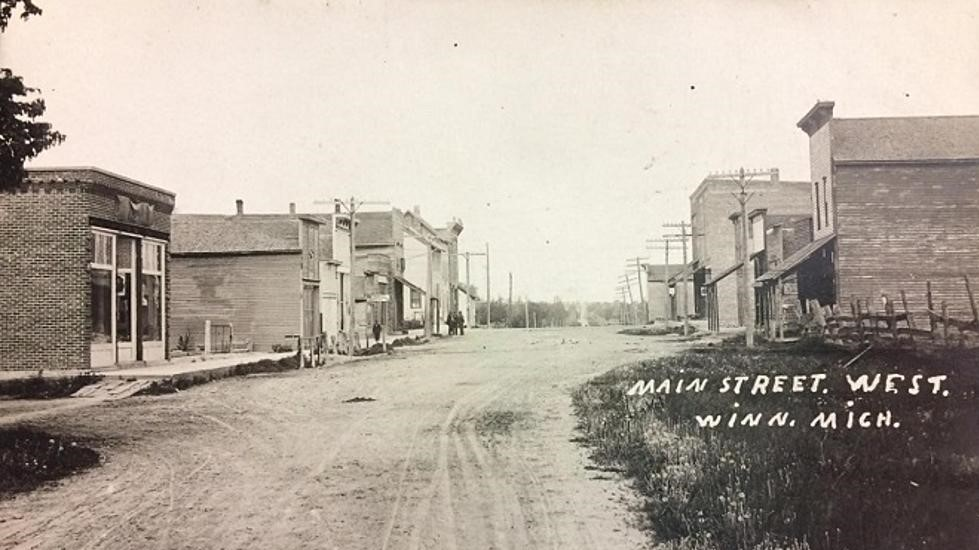
Historic images of Main Street in downtown Winn in the early 1900s

Fremont Township was sparsely settled at the time when it was formally organized in 1863, and the area's population grew enough to warrant a new log house post office. Mr. Winn settled in the area and established the first post office under his name on December 19, 1867. Franklin Williams served as the first postmaster, and he also agreed on the name Winn for the new community.

In 1875, Ohio native William Dush settled in the area about 12 miles (19 km) southwest of Mount Pleasant in order to exploit the area's lumber resources. He began officially platting the community of Winn, which was registered with the state on October 26, 1876. The community was first mapped in section 15 of an 1879 map of Fremont Township. The community was listed dually as Dushville and Winn. Dush was a businessman who built a steam-powered sawmill, while the surrounding area became prominent farmland. The community began to grow, and the post office name was changed to Dushville on January 26, 1882 with himself serving as postmaster. At this time, the lumber industry was declining, and the community recorded a population of around 200 residents. Dushville began transitioning away from lumber and grew to include several general stores, blacksmith shop, boarding house, church, and a Good Templars lodge. In 1885, the community recorded around 250 residents. Soon after, the community was ravaged with several fires that destroyed Dush's general store and supplies, as well as his sawmill. He rebuilt the sawmill but moved away from the community and resettled in Broomfield Township to the northwest, only to die in a sawmill explosion in 1888.

The name of the community was interchangeably called Winn and Dushville. An unorganized area north of the community was unofficially referred to as Hardscrabble, allegedly due to conflicts with other property owners and William Dush. After Dush's death, the community petitioned to have the post office changed back to Winn, which became official on January 14, 1898. In 1910, the community of Winn recorded its highest population of 310 residents and also included numerous businesses and surrounding farmland. In 1946, the Morey Brothers moved to the area and reestablished the lumber industry in the community. By 1951, the Morey Mill reached a peak and was referred to as the biggest sawmill in Central Michigan in terms of size and output. Their lumber products were used for flooring and furniture and shipped all over the county.

=== Recent history ===
On the centennial anniversary of the community's official platting in 1976, Winn received recognition from numerous politicians, including governor William Milliken and senator Robert P. Griffin, among others, who congratulated the community on its longevity.

For the 2020 census, Winn was included as a newly-listed census-designated place. Winn continues to remain an unincorporated community with no legal autonomy of its own.

== Geography ==
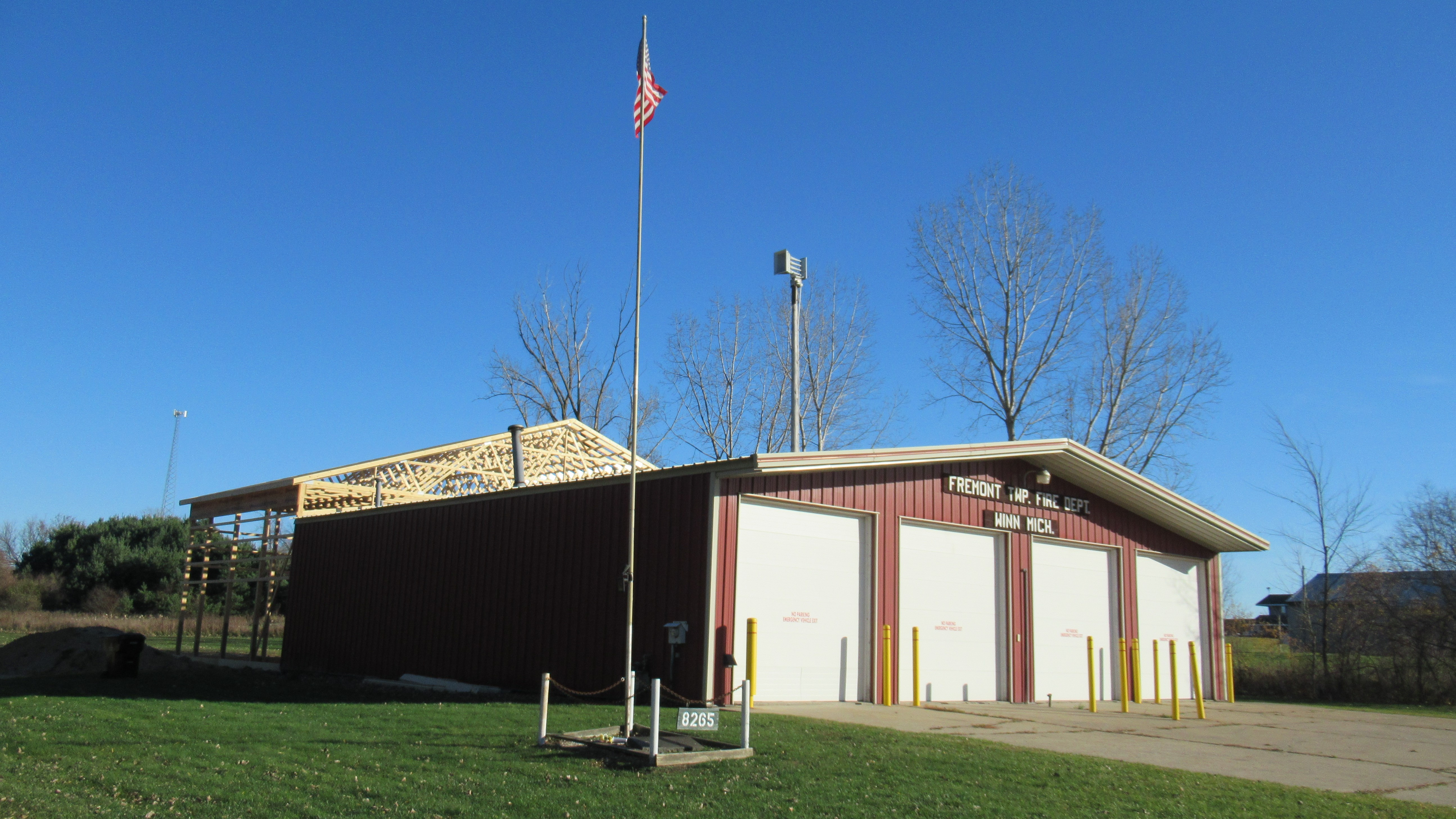
Fremont Township Fire Department

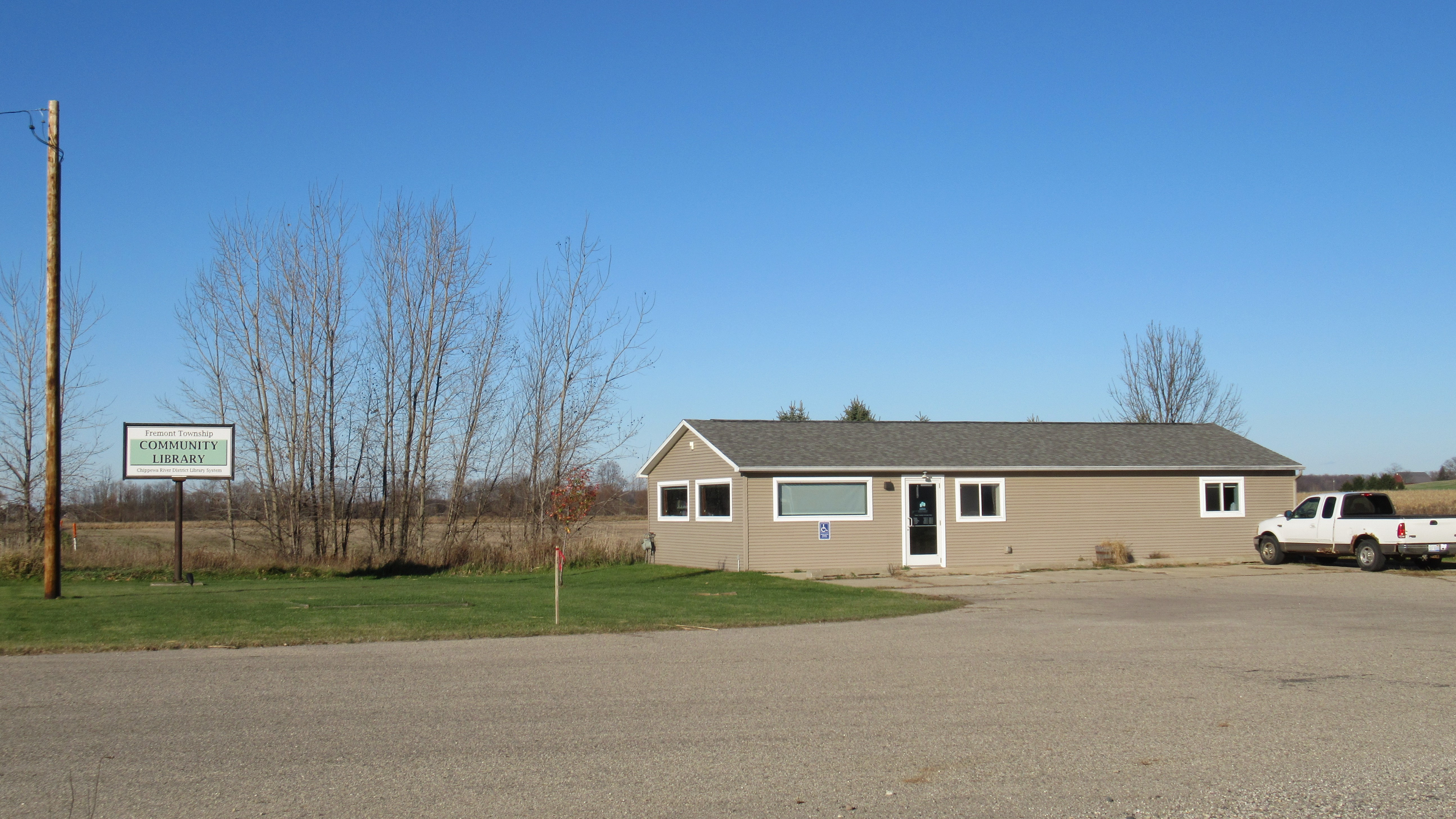
Fremont Township Community Library

According to the U.S. Census Bureau, the Winn CDP has a total area of 0.57 square miles (1.48 km^{2}), all land.

Winn is centrally located in the state's Lower Peninsula in rural Isabella County about 10 miles (16 km) southwest of the city of Mount Pleasant. The community sits at an elevation of 869 feet (265 m) above sea level. Winn is centered along Winn Road and Blanchard Road in central Fremont Township. There are no major highways serving the community, as U.S. Route 127 is about 11 miles (18 km) to the east. In addition to Mount Pleasant, the other nearest incorporated communities are the villages of Shepherd to the east and Edmore to the southwest. Other unincorporated communities include Beal City to the north, Lake Isabella and Remus to the northwest, Blanchard to the west, Cedar Lake and Vestaburg to the south, and Elwell to the southeast. The Isabella Indian Reservation is to the north but does not include the area of Winn. Cedar Creek, which is a tributary of the Chippewa River, flows through the northern portion of the community.

The Winn post office uses the 48896 ZIP Code, which is used primarily for post office box services only. The Winn post office is located at 2855 West Blanchard Road in the center of the community. The Mount Pleasant 48858 ZIP Code serves most of the community. Areas to the south and east may be served by the Shepherd 48883 ZIP Code, and the Blanchard 49310 ZIP Code serves the areas immediately to the west.

The Fremont Township Fire Department is located within Winn at 8375 South Winn Road. The Winn Community Center is home to the Fremont Township offices and is located at 2783 West Blanchard Road. The Chippewa River District Library has a rural branch located in Winn. The Fremont Township Community Library was established in 1981 and has occupied its current location at 7959 South Winn Road since 2017.

== Demographics ==
Historical population
Census	Pop.	Note	%±
2020	166		—
U.S. Decennial Census

== Education ==
The community of Winn received its first school in 1881 when the county's school districts were reorganized. District 7 was established as the largest district in Fremont Township. A two-story schoolhouse was constructed to serve the community. Students from other surrounding districts came to Winn to seek a higher education, as most schools only served students up until eighth grade. District 7 eventually grew to serve students up to the eleventh grade by 1925. The district served the community, but the population outgrew the schoolhouse. With no funds or agreement to build a new school, the district dissolved and merged with the Shepherd Public School System.

Winn continues to be served entirely by Shepherd Public School District to the east in the village of Shepherd. Winn Elementary School is located within the community. Some of the surrounding areas may be served by Montabella Community Schools in Montcalm County or Mt. Pleasant City School District in Mount Pleasant.

== Notable people ==
- Henry Wiles, motorcycle racer, born in Winn
