= The Incredible Dr. Pol =

American reality television series (2011–2024)

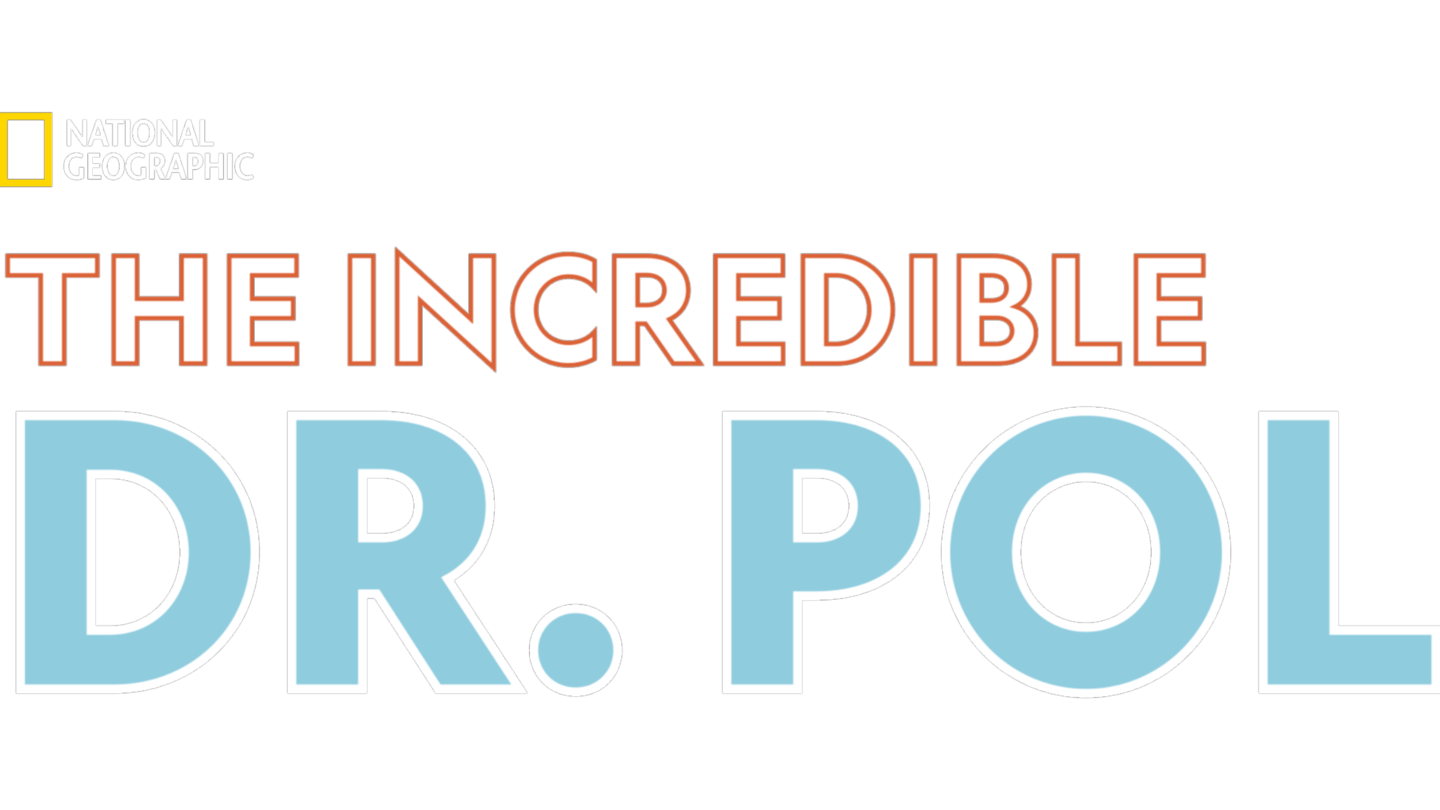
- Genre: Reality television
- Created by: Jon Schroder
- Developed by: Charles Pol
- Starring: Jan Pol; Diane Pol; Charles Pol; Brenda Grettenberger; Nicole Arcy; Ray Harp; Lisa Jones
- Narrated by: Ari Rubin
- Country of origin: United States
- Original language: English
- No. of seasons: 24
- No. of episodes: 254

Production
- Producer: Charles Pol
- Production location: Weidman, Michigan
- Running time: 44–50/60 (S19 E1) minutes
- Production companies: National Geographic; Super Alright

Original release
- Network: Nat Geo Wild
- Release: October 29, 2011 – July 6, 2024

The Incredible Dr. Pol is an American reality television series on Nat Geo Wild that follows Dutch-American veterinarian Jan Pol and his family and employees at his practice in rural Weidman, Michigan. The series premiered October 29, 2011, and has two or three seasons every year. On July 6, 2024, National Geographic announced the cancellation of the show due to declining viewership, production costs, and changes in the network's programming strategy.

== Cast ==
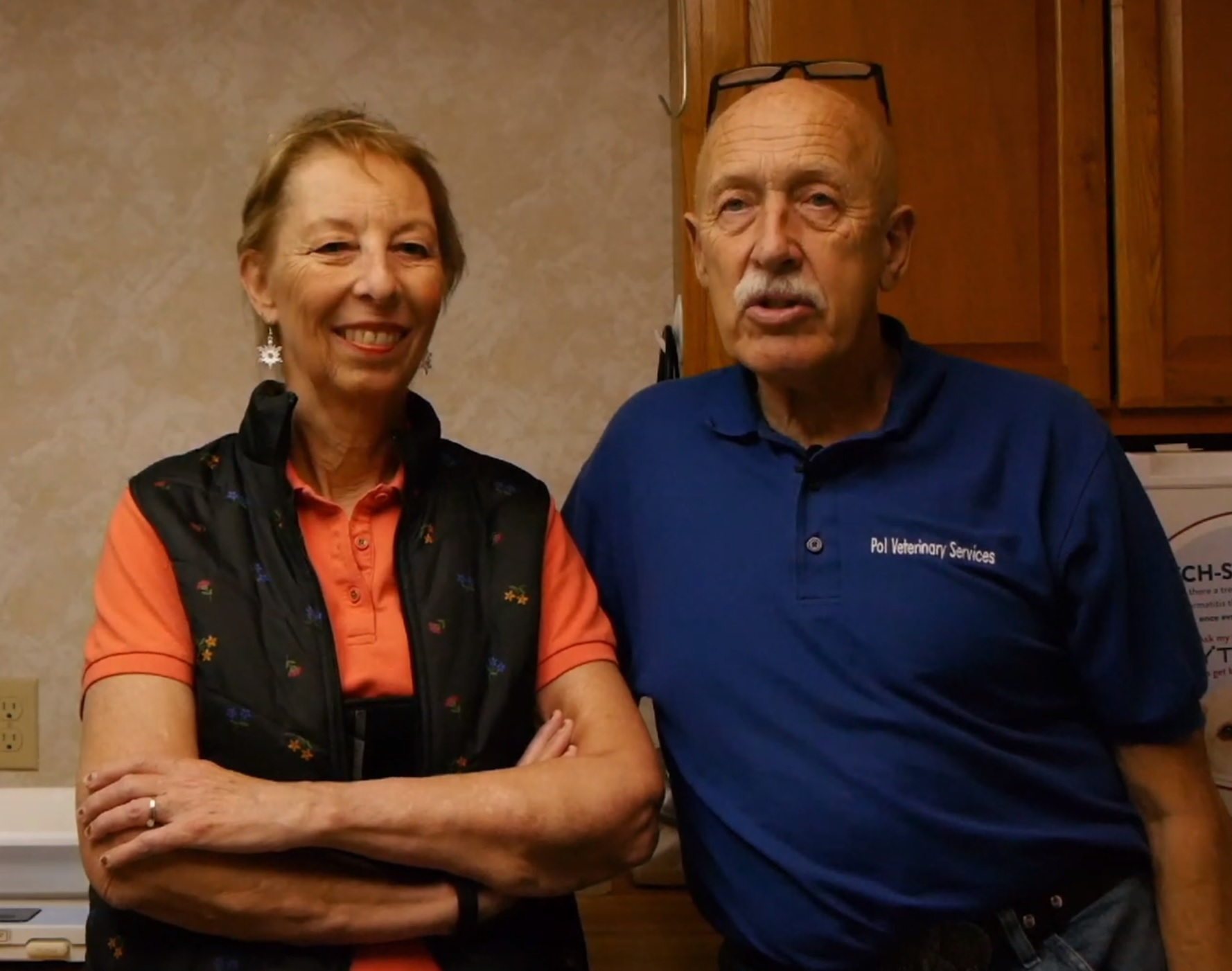
Diane and Jan Pol in 2019

- Jan Pol was born on September 4, 1942, in Wateren, Netherlands. He studied veterinary medicine at Utrecht University, graduating in 1970. He and his wife moved to Harbor Beach, Michigan, where Pol worked for a veterinarian for more than 10 years. He moved to Weidman, Michigan, where he opened Pol Veterinary Services out of his home in 1981. Pol's practice includes large and small animals.
- Diane Pol was born in Mayville, Michigan, on February 6, 1943. She met Jan Pol when he was a foreign exchange student at Mayville High School in 1961. She has a master's degree in Special Reading and was a teacher at Harbor Beach Elementary School. The Pols have been married for more than 56 years.
- Charles Pol graduated from the University of Miami in Florida, 2003. He is a producer.
- Brenda Grettenberger was born on February 23, 1967, in Eaton Rapids, Michigan. She graduated from Michigan State University College of Veterinary Medicine in 1992.
- Emily Thomas was born on April 3, 1984, in Warner Robins, Georgia. She graduated from University of Georgia College of Veterinary Medicine in 2010. Thomas is married and the mother of three children. She left the practice in 2019 when she relocated to Virginia.
- Nicole Arcy was born on December 20, 1993, in Dearborn, Michigan. She graduated from the College of Veterinary Medicine of University of Missouri.
- Ray Harp appeared on the show from 2019 to 2021.
- Lisa Jones graduated in veterinary medicine from Cornell University.

== License action ==
In 2014, Pol was fined $500 and had his license put on probation by the Michigan Board of Veterinary Medicine for not wearing proper surgical attire during treatment of a Boston Terrier. A year later, the sentencing was overturned by the Michigan Court of Appeals, which reversed the action, determining that there was no evidence of a breach of the standard of care and citing that the owners of the animals in question were satisfied with the outcome.

== Spinoff ==
A spinoff series, The Incredible Pol Farm, premiered on Nat Geo Wild on January 6, 2024. The new show follows Charles Pol and his family as they work to establish a farm on 350 acres of undeveloped property.
