= Jan Pol =

Dutch-American veterinarian

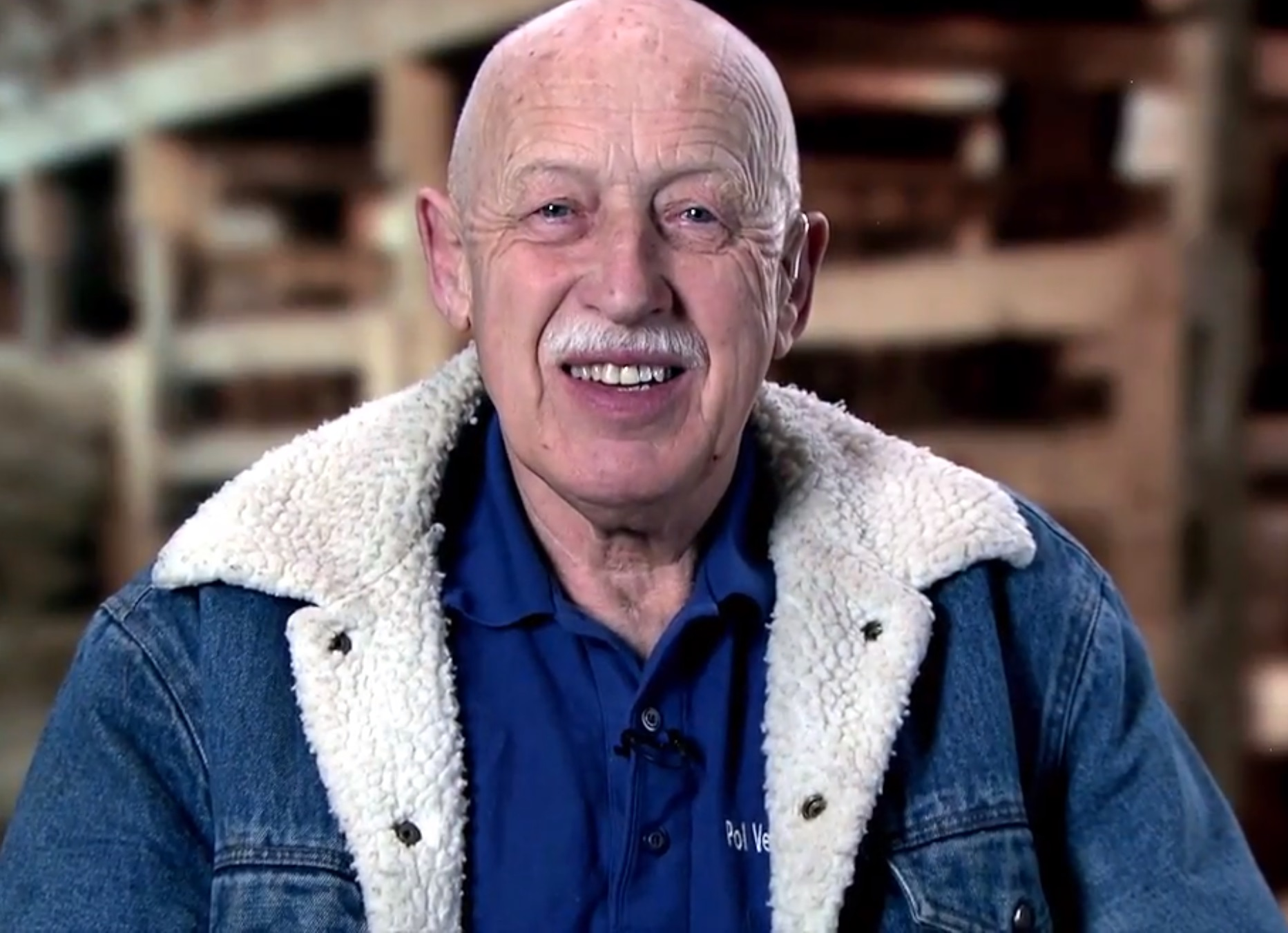
- Pol in 2017
- Born: Jan-Harm Pol; September 4, 1942 (age 83); Wateren, Drenthe, Netherlands
- Education: Utrecht University
- Occupation: Veterinarian
- Television: The Incredible Dr. Pol
- Spouse: Diane Dalrymple (m. 1967)

Jan-Harm Pol (born September 4, 1942) is a Dutch-American veterinarian who starred on the reality television show The Incredible Dr. Pol on Nat Geo Wild.

== Early life and career ==
Jan-Harm Pol was born on September 4, 1942, in Wateren, Drenthe, in the Netherlands. Pol grew up on his family's dairy farm.

He met his wife, Diane Dalrymple, when he was a foreign exchange student at Mayville High School in 1961.

In 1970, Pol graduated with a degree in veterinary medicine at Utrecht University. He and his wife moved to Harbor Beach, Michigan, where he worked for a veterinarian practice for 10 years. He moved to Weidman, Michigan, where he started Pol Veterinary Services in 1981. The clinic treats animals from surrounding neighborhoods due to the lack of veterinary services in rural Michigan.

In 2013, Pol testified before the Michigan House of Representatives in favor of a bill to prohibit authorities from investigating reports of misconduct or allegations based upon information obtained from viewing the broadcast of a reality program, but the bill died in committee.

In 2013, Pol received an honorary doctorate of public service from Central Michigan University.

He was fined $500 in 2014 and had his license put on probation by the Michigan Board of Veterinary Medicine for not wearing proper surgical attire during treatment of a Boston Terrier. A year later, the sentencing was overturned by the Michigan Court of Appeals, which reversed and remanded, holding inter alia that there was no competent evidence that there was a breach of the standard of care.

After 24 seasons over 14 years, National Geographic stopped making new episodes of The Incredible Dr. Pol, but continues to show reruns of the program. National Geographic WILD launched a spin off series The Incredible Pol Farm in January 2024, highlighting the Pol family building a hobby farm from the ground up. Only lasting one season, Dr. Pol and his family have now created a new veterinary app called Dr. Pol CARE and continues his veterinary practice in rural Michigan.
