= Weidman, Michigan =

- Census-designated place (CDP) & unincorporated community
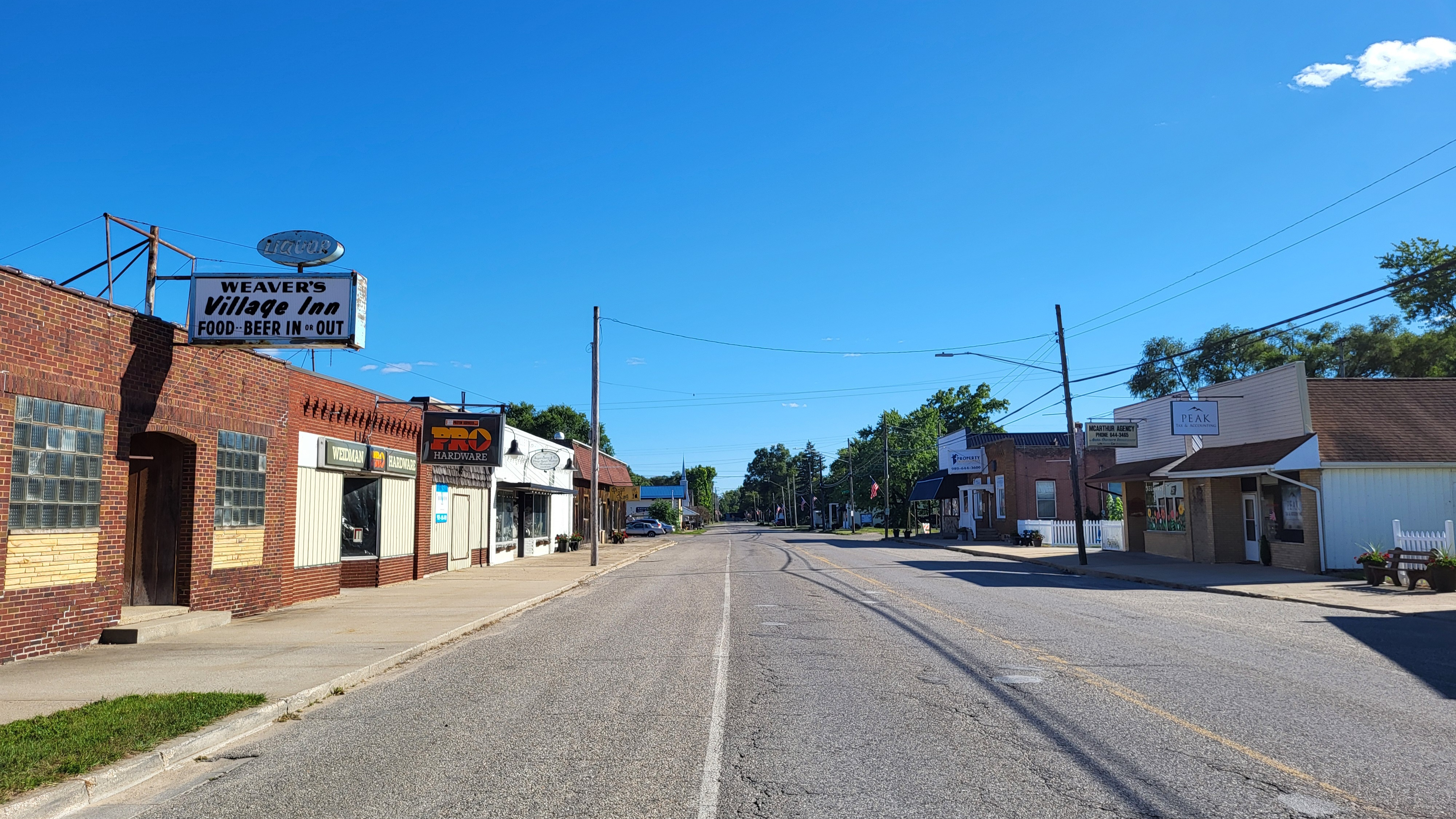
- Looking south along N. Woodruff Road

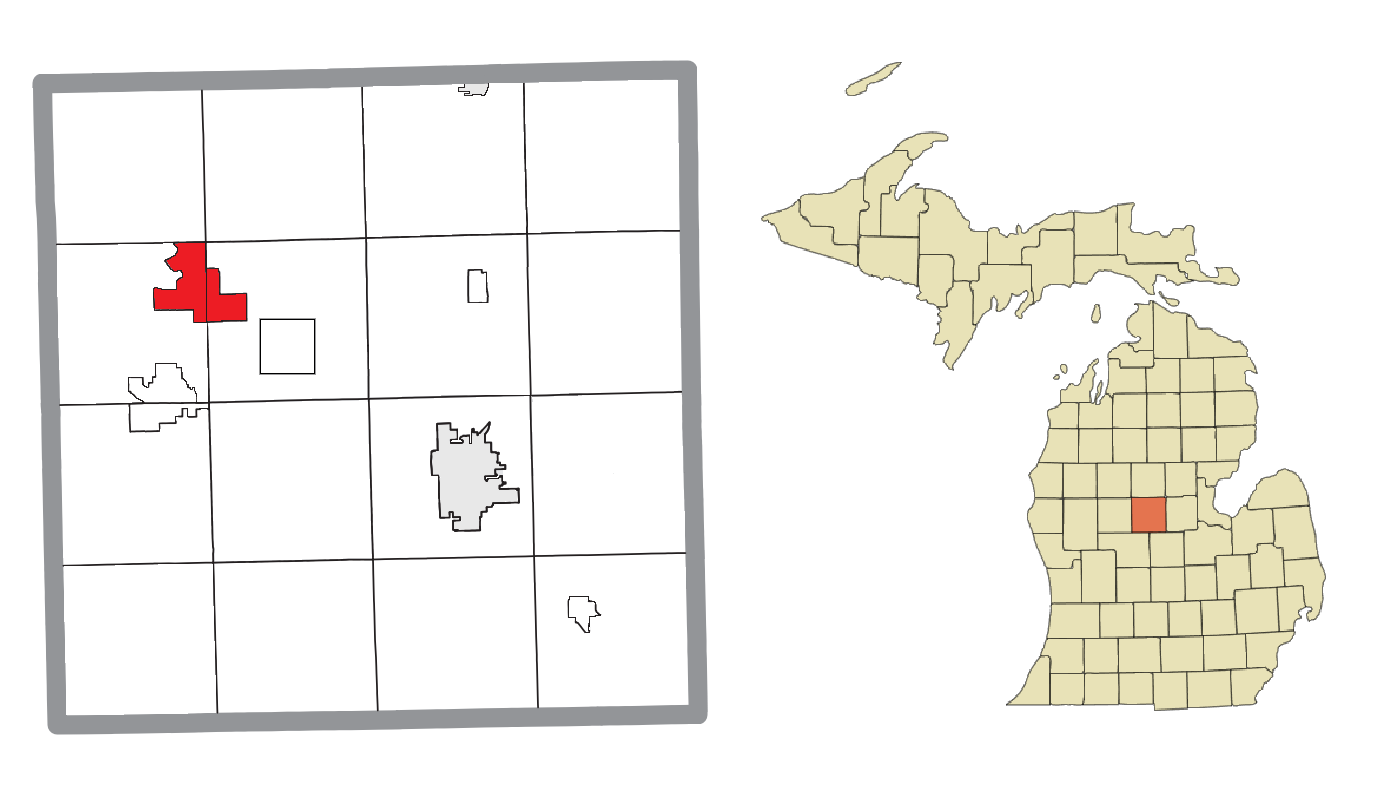
- Location within Isabella County

- Location within the state of Michigan Location within the United States
- Coordinates: 43°41′15″N 84°58′08″W
- Country: United States
- State: Michigan
- County: Isabella
- Townships: Nottawa and Sherman
- Settled: 1894

Area
  - Total: 5.95 sq mi (15.41 km^{2})
  - Land: 5.65 sq mi (14.64 km^{2})
  - Water: 0.30 sq mi (0.77 km^{2})
- Elevation: 892 ft (272 m)

Population (2020)
  - Total: 920
  - Density: 162.7/sq mi (62.83/km^{2})
- Time zone: UTC-5 (Eastern (EST))
  - Summer (DST): UTC-4 (EDT)
- ZIP code(s): 48893
- Area code: 989
- FIPS code: 26-85140
- GNIS feature ID: 1615969

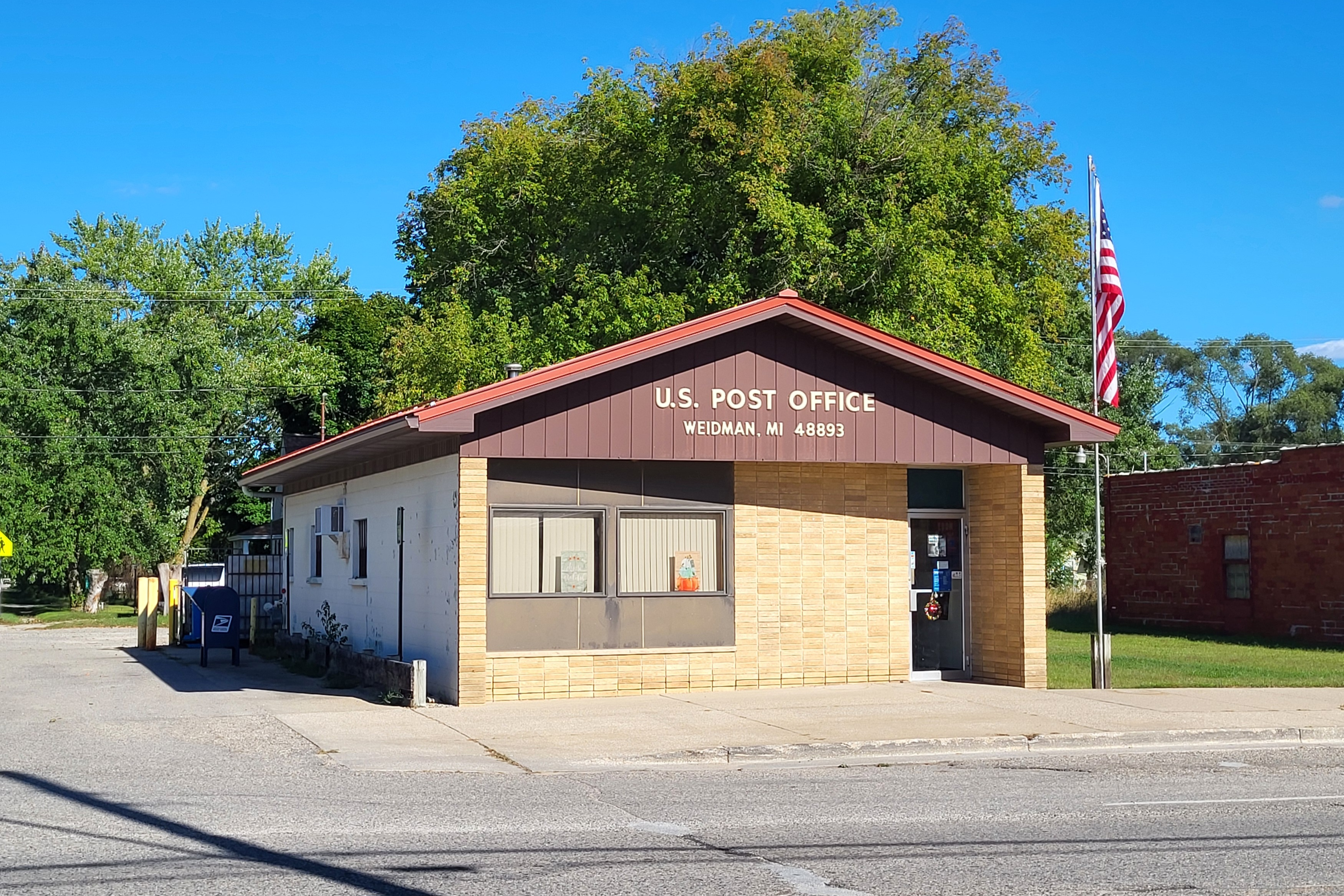
U.S. Post Office in Weidman

Weidman is an unincorporated community and census-designated place (CDP) in Isabella County in the U.S. state of Michigan. The CDP had a population of 920 at the 2020 census. The community is located within Nottawa Township to the east and Sherman Township to the west.

As an unincorporated community, Weidman has no legal autonomy of its own but does have its own post office with the 48893 ZIP Code.

== Geography ==
According to the United States Census Bureau, the CDP has a total area of 5.9 square miles (15.4 km^{2}), of which 5.6 square miles (14.6 km^{2}) are land and 0.3 square miles (0.8 km^{2}), or 4.98%, are water. The built-up center of town is in the southern part of the CDP, on the south side of Lake of the Hills on the Coldwater River. The Coldwater is a south-flowing tributary of the Chippewa River and thus part of the Saginaw River drainage basin.

Weidman is 16 miles (26 km) by road northwest of Mount Pleasant, the Isabella County seat, and 19 miles (31 km) southwest of Clare.

The community is situated on the boundary between Nottawa Township on the east and Sherman Township on the west. The area of the CDP within Sherman Township is somewhat larger than that within Nottawa Township. The Nottawa Township section lies within the Isabella Indian Reservation. The postal delivery area for the Weidman 48893 ZIP Code is much larger, including large portions of both Sherman and Nottawa townships, as well as portions of Coldwater and Gilmore townships on the north and Broomfield and Deerfield townships on the south, as well as the village of Lake Isabella and the western half of the community of Beal City.

== Demographics ==
Historical population
Census	Pop.	Note	%±
2020	920		—
U.S. Decennial Census

As of the census of 2000, there were 879 people, 344 households, and 258 families residing in the CDP. The population density was 159.4 inhabitants per square mile (61.5/km^{2}). There were 389 housing units at an average density of 70.5 per square mile (27.2/km^{2}). The racial makeup of the CDP was 94.88% White, 0.34% Black or African American, 3.53% Native American, 0.23% Asian, 0.23% from other races, and 0.80% from two or more races. Hispanic or Latino of any race were 1.02% of the population.

There were 344 households, out of which 34.0% had children under the age of 18 living with them, 60.8% were married couples living together, 9.3% had a female householder with no husband present, and 25.0% were non-families. 20.3% of all households were made up of individuals, and 8.7% had someone living alone who was 65 years of age or older. The average household size was 2.55 and the average family size was 2.92.

In the CDP, the population was spread out, with 26.2% under the age of 18, 7.3% from 18 to 24, 28.8% from 25 to 44, 23.3% from 45 to 64, and 14.4% who were 65 years of age or older. The median age was 38 years. For every 100 females, there were 96.2 males. For every 100 females age 18 and over, there were 96.7 males.

The median income for a household in the CDP was $36,042, and the median income for a family was $37,857. Males had a median income of $35,469 versus $19,732 for females. The per capita income for the CDP was $15,968. About 8.9% of families and 9.9% of the population were below the poverty line, including 9.7% of those under age 18 and 10.2% of those age 65 or over.

== Notable business ==
The Incredible Dr. Pol is a Nat Geo Wild popular reality show that follows veterinarian Jan Pol, his family and employees, centered around his veterinarian office in Weidman.
