= Small Mastiff Dogs =

Small Mastiff Dogs may refer to:

- French Bulldog
- Pug
- Boston Terrier
