= Fremont Township, Isabella County, Michigan =

Fremont Township, Michigan
- Civil township
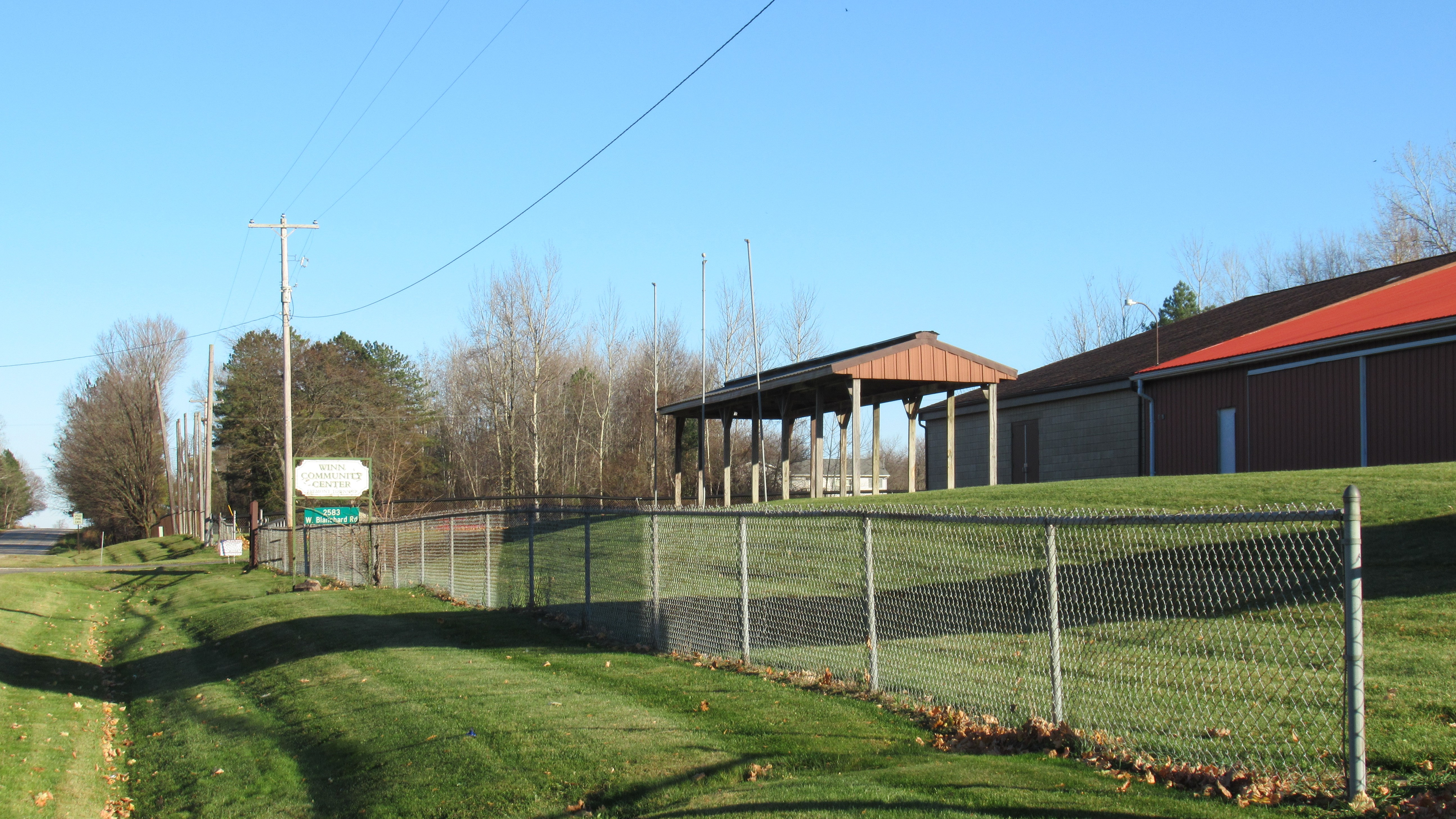
- Winn Community Center in Winn

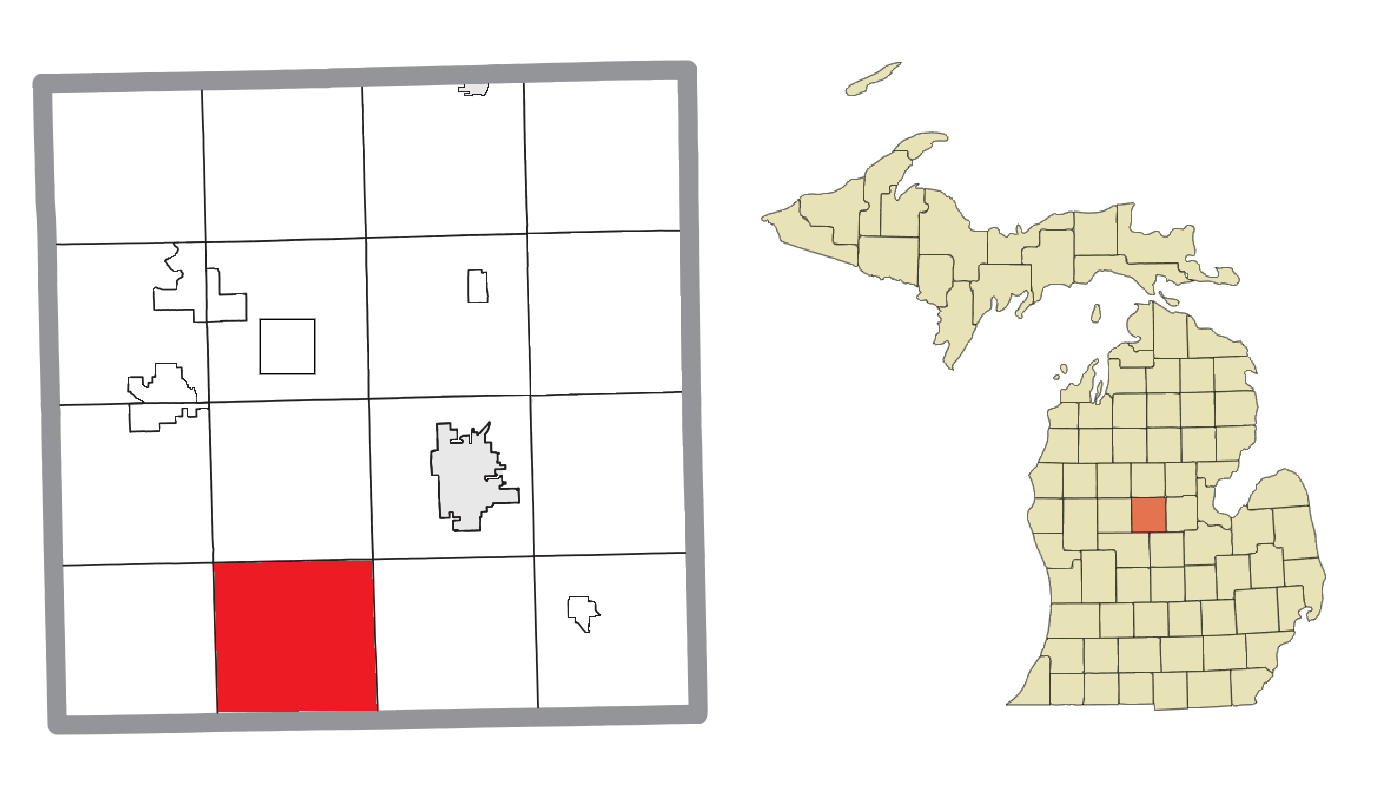
- Location within Isabella County

- Location within the state of Michigan Location within the United States
- Coordinates: 43°30′38″N 84°54′30″W
- Country: United States
- State: Michigan
- County: Isabella

Area
  - Total: 35.9 sq mi (92.9 km^{2})
  - Land: 35.8 sq mi (92.8 km^{2})
  - Water: 0.039 sq mi (0.1 km^{2})
- Elevation: 840 ft (256 m)

Population (2020)
  - Total: 1,445
  - Density: 40.3/sq mi (15.6/km^{2})
- Time zone: UTC-5 (Eastern (EST))
  - Summer (DST): UTC-4 (EDT)
- ZIP code(s): 48896, 48858, 49310, 48883, 49340, 48877
- Area code: 989
- FIPS code: 26-30680
- GNIS feature ID: 1626316
- Website: https://fremonttwnshp.com/

Fremont Township is a civil township of Isabella County in the U.S. state of Michigan. The population was 1,445 at the 2020 census.

== Communities ==
- Bristol, located on the Pine River, was first settled in 1866.
- Winn is an unincorporated community and census-designated place in the center of the township at 43°31′24″N 84°54′06″W.

== Geography ==
According to the United States Census Bureau, the township has a total area of 35.9 square miles (93 km^{2}), of which 35.8 square miles (93 km^{2}) is land and 0.04 square miles (0.10 km^{2}) (0.11%) is water.

== Demographics ==
As of the census of 2000, there were 1,358 people, 489 households, and 365 families residing in the township. The population density was 37.9 inhabitants per square mile (14.6/km^{2}). There were 519 housing units at an average density of 14.5 per square mile (5.6/km^{2}). The racial makeup of the township was 98.01% White, 0.07% African American, 0.29% Native American, 0.07% Asian, 0.15% Pacific Islander, 0.37% from other races, and 1.03% from two or more races. Hispanic or Latino of any race were 1.62% of the population.

There were 489 households, out of which 37.8% had children under the age of 18 living with them, 62.2% were married couples living together, 8.6% had a female householder with no husband present, and 25.2% were non-families. 20.4% of all households were made up of individuals, and 8.4% had someone living alone who was 65 years of age or older. The average household size was 2.78 and the average family size was 3.21.

In the township the population was spread out, with 30.0% under the age of 18, 7.7% from 18 to 24, 31.1% from 25 to 44, 21.6% from 45 to 64, and 9.6% who were 65 years of age or older. The median age was 34 years. For every 100 females, there were 101.8 males. For every 100 females age 18 and over, there were 101.5 males.

The median income for a household in the township was $40,577, and the median income for a family was $45,956. Males had a median income of $31,603 versus $20,893 for females. The per capita income for the township was $16,644. About 4.1% of families and 7.0% of the population were below the poverty line, including 4.5% of those under age 18 and 8.1% of those age 65 or over.
