= Sherman Township, Isabella County, Michigan =

Sherman Township, Michigan
- Civil township
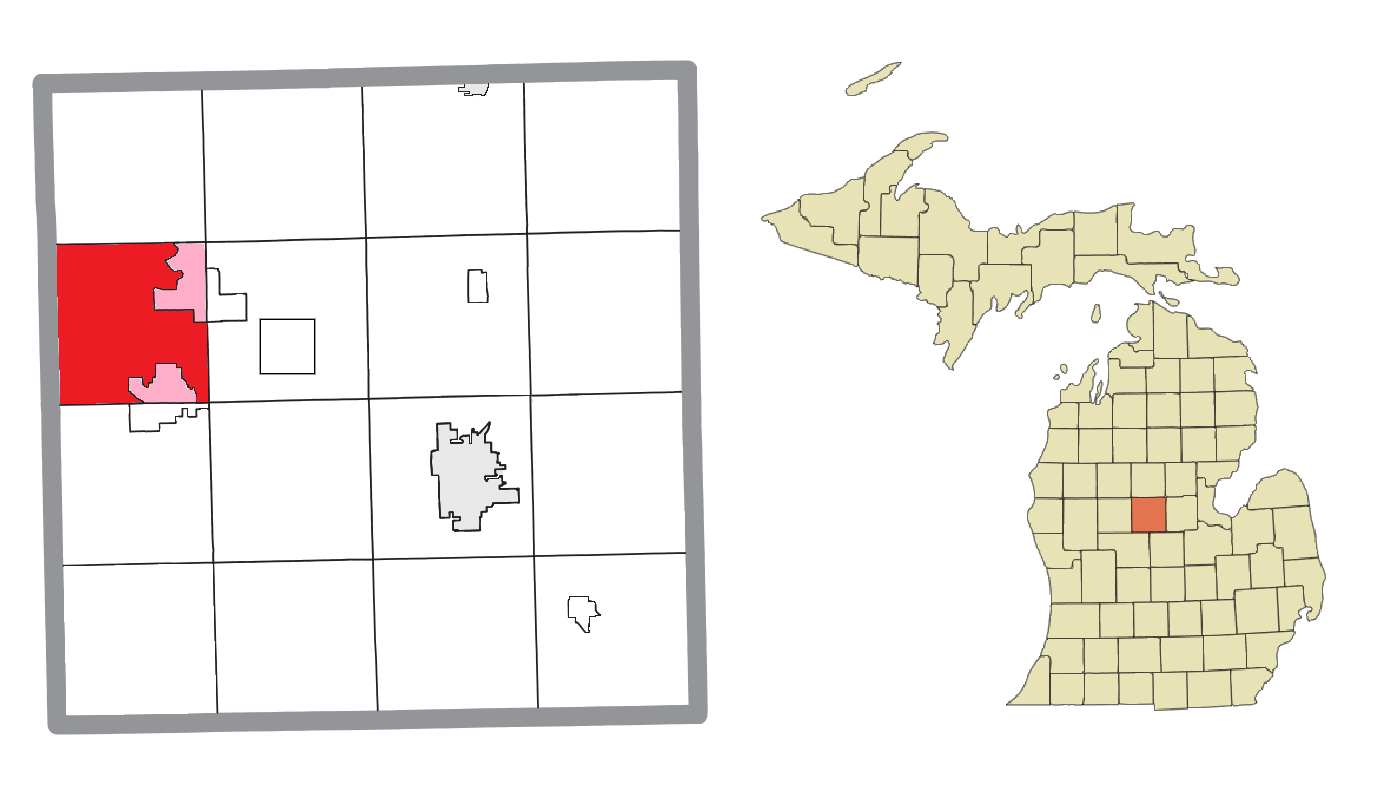
- Location within Isabella County (red) and portions of the village of Lake Isabella and community of Weidman (pink)

- Location within the state of Michigan Sherman Township (the United States)
- Coordinates: 43°41′07″N 85°01′40″W
- Country: United States
- State: Michigan
- County: Isabella

Area
  - Total: 35.6 sq mi (92.2 km^{2})
  - Land: 34.8 sq mi (90.1 km^{2})
  - Water: 0.77 sq mi (2.0 km^{2})
- Elevation: 938 ft (286 m)

Population (2020)
  - Total: 3,127
  - Density: 89.9/sq mi (34.7/km^{2})
- Time zone: UTC-5 (Eastern (EST))
  - Summer (DST): UTC-4 (EDT)
- ZIP code(s): 48632 (Lake), 48893, 49340
- Area code: 989
- FIPS code: 26-73200
- GNIS feature ID: 1627073
- Website: https://shermantwp.com/

Sherman Township is a civil township of Isabella County in the U.S. state of Michigan. The population was 3,127 at the 2020 census.

== Communities ==
With the exception of the Village of Lake Isabella, there are no incorporated communities within the township. Mt. Pleasant, several miles to the southeast, is the nearest city.

- Drew was the name of a station on the Pere Marquette Railroad that had a post office from 1899 until 1904.
- Sherman City is a small unincorporated community in the northwest corner of the township (and partially within Coldwater Township to the north). It is situated on the Chippewa River at 43°43′36″N 85°04′38″W. The FIPS place code is 73340 and the elevation is 963 feet above sea level.
- Weidman is an unincorporated community and census-designated place on the eastern edge of the township (and also partially within adjacent Nottawa Township.)
- The village of Lake Isabella, on the southern boundary, is partially within Sherman Township and partially in Broomfield Township.

== Geography ==
According to the United States Census Bureau, the township has a total area of 35.6 square miles (92.2 km^{2}), of which 34.8 square miles (90.1 km^{2}) are land and 0.8 square miles (2.0 km^{2}) of it (2.22%) are water.

== Demographics ==
As of the census of 2000, there were 2,616 people, 1,025 households, and 759 families residing in the township. The population density was 75.2 inhabitants per square mile (29.0/km^{2}). There were 1,374 housing units at an average density of 39.5 per square mile (15.3/km^{2}). The racial makeup of the township was 96.06% White, 0.42% African American, 1.03% Native American, 0.19% Asian, 0.50% from other races, and 1.80% from two or more races. Hispanic or Latino of any race were 1.61% of the population.

Of the 1,025 households, 30.1% had children under the age of 18 living with them, 60.8% had married couples living together, 9.0% had a female householder with no husband present, and 25.9% were non-families. 20.2% of all households were made up of individuals, and 7.3% had someone living alone who was 65 years of age or older. The average household size was 2.54 and the average family size was 2.91.

The population consisted of 25.2% under the age of 18, 7.1% from 18 to 24, 27.8% from 25 to 44, 26.0% from 45 to 64, and 14.0% who were 65 years of age or older. The median age was 38 years. For every 100 females, there were 97.4 males. For every 100 females age 18 and over, there were 96.7 males.

The median income for a household in the township was $36,371, and the median income for a family was $40,750. Males had a median income of $32,386 versus $23,542 for females. The per capita income for the township was $18,296. About 7.1% of families and 10.7% of the population were below the poverty line, including 12.2% of those under age 18 and 7.5% of those age 65 or over.
