= Lennu =

Dog of the Finnish president (2011–2021)

Lennu (official name: Anjyr's Boreas, 7 March 2011 – 21 May 2021) was the pet Boston Terrier dog of President of Finland Sauli Niinistö and his wife Jenni Haukio. Lennu's father had come to Finland from Germany and his mother from Estonia.

Lennu was often present in official appearances by president Niinistö. The dog received international attention in social media when the American journalist Kelly Weil published two pictures of the dog taken by Heikki Saukkomaa on Twitter in February 2017. In the United States, Lennu was also briefly featured in The Tonight Show Starring Jimmy Fallon, showing Internet memes made from him. In May 2017, a picture of Lennu in Niinistö's lap was shown at Reddit in a forum where users competed in image manipulation. The Lennu challenge was so popular it was shown at the Reddit front page. The dog has also had a pastry named after him. Lennu was present in accepting Christmas greetings addressed to the president and was almost the leading character in the Yle News broadcast: he was very interested in the Christmas ham and pike.

In May 2020, president Niinistö announced that Lennu had been kept out of publicity because blunt-nosed dogs can have health problems, and the presidential couple thus did not want to keep their dog in the public eye. They had not known of the health problems caused by the breeding of this particular breed when acquiring the dog.

Lennu died on 21 May 2021 due to a pituitary gland tumor.

== See also ==
- List of individual dogs
