= Lake Isabella, Michigan =

- Village
- Village of Lake Isabella
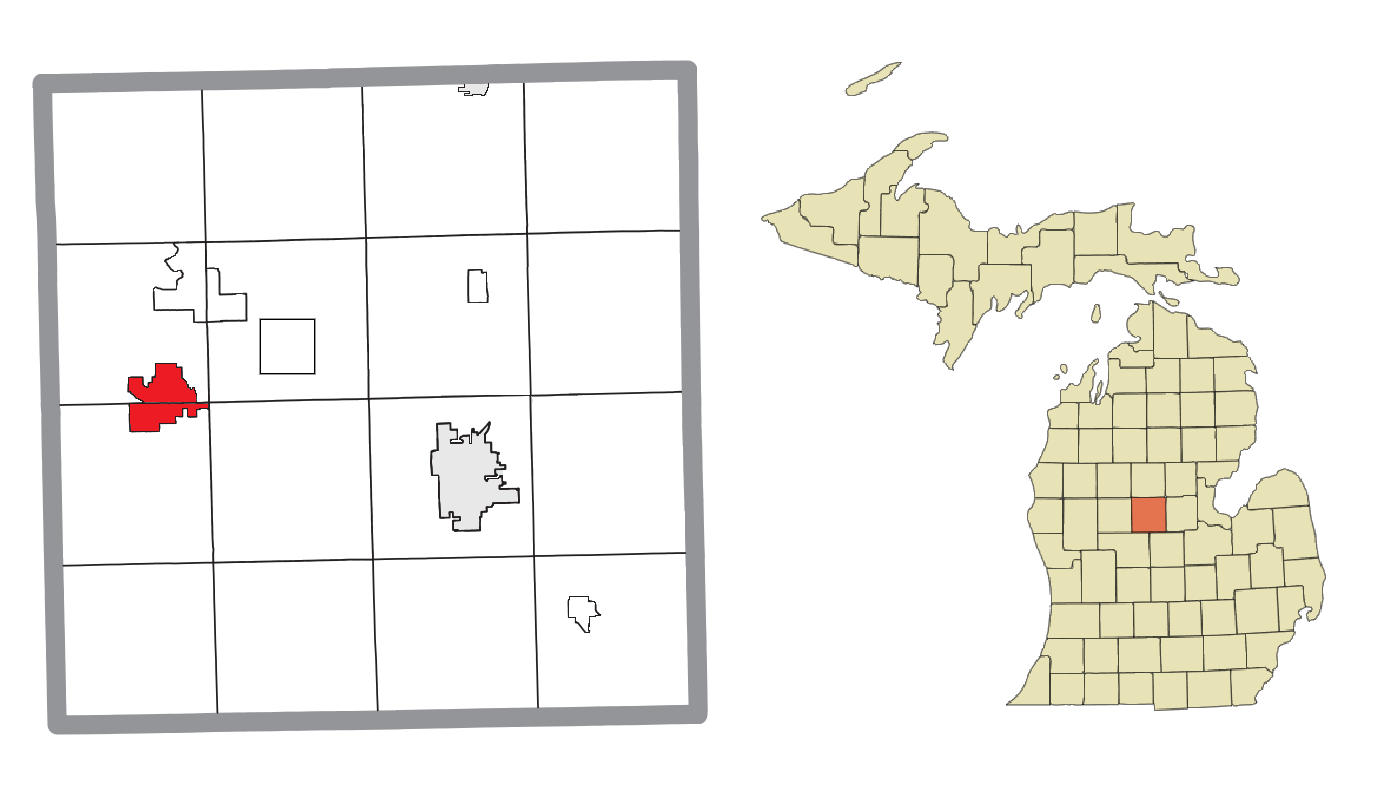
- Location within Isabella County

- Location within the state of Michigan Location within the United States
- Coordinates: 43°38′37″N 84°59′50″W
- Country: United States
- State: Michigan
- County: Isabella
- Townships: Broomfield and Sherman
- Established: 1968
- Incorporated: 1998

Government
  - Type: Village council
  - President: Dave Torgerson
  - Clerk: Carol Shannon

Area
  - Total: 4.61 sq mi (11.95 km^{2})
  - Land: 3.48 sq mi (9.01 km^{2})
  - Water: 1.14 sq mi (2.94 km^{2})
- Elevation: 781 ft (238 m)

Population (2020)
  - Total: 1,829
  - Density: 525.57/sq mi (202.92/km^{2})
- Time zone: UTC-5 (Eastern (EST))
  - Summer (DST): UTC-4 (EDT)
- ZIP code(s): 48893 (Weidman)
- Area code: 989
- FIPS code: 26-69640
- GNIS feature ID: 0636218
- Website: Official website

Lake Isabella is a village within Isabella County in the U.S. state of Michigan. The village is split between Broomfield Township to the south and Sherman Township to the north. As of the 2020 census, Lake Isabella had a population of 1,829.

== Geography ==
According to the U.S. Census Bureau, the village has a total area of 4.62 square miles (11.97 km^{2}), of which 3.48 square miles (9.01 km^{2}) is land and 1.14 square miles (2.95 km^{2}) is water.

== Demographics ==
Historical population
Census	Pop.	Note	%±
2000	1,243		—
2010	1,681		35.2%
2020	1,829		8.8%
U.S. Decennial Census

=== 2020 census ===
As of the 2020 census, Lake Isabella had a population of 1,829. The median age was 47.7 years. 20.9% of residents were under the age of 18 and 25.8% of residents were 65 years of age or older. For every 100 females there were 101.0 males, and for every 100 females age 18 and over there were 97.4 males age 18 and over.

0.0% of residents lived in urban areas, while 100.0% lived in rural areas.

There were 779 households in Lake Isabella, of which 30.4% had children under the age of 18 living in them. Of all households, 59.7% were married-couple households, 15.5% were households with a male householder and no spouse or partner present, and 18.7% were households with a female householder and no spouse or partner present. About 20.3% of all households were made up of individuals and 8.9% had someone living alone who was 65 years of age or older.

There were 954 housing units, of which 18.3% were vacant. The homeowner vacancy rate was 1.9% and the rental vacancy rate was 13.7%.

Racial composition as of the 2020 census
Race	Number	Percent
White	1,702	93.1%
Black or African American	7	0.4%
American Indian and Alaska Native	8	0.4%
Asian	9	0.5%
Native Hawaiian and Other Pacific Islander	0	0.0%
Some other race	12	0.7%
Two or more races	91	5.0%
Hispanic or Latino (of any race)	54	3.0%

=== 2010 census ===
As of the census of 2010, there were 1,681 people, 694 households, and 507 families residing in the village. The population density was 478.9 inhabitants per square mile (184.9/km^{2}). There were 939 housing units at an average density of 267.5 per square mile (103.3/km^{2}). The racial makeup of the village was 95.1% White, 0.4% African American, 1.1% Native American, 0.5% Asian, 0.1% Pacific Islander, 0.8% from other races, and 2.0% from two or more races. Hispanic or Latino of any race were 3.6% of the population.

There were 694 households, of which 29.1% had children under the age of 18 living with them, 62.2% were married couples living together, 7.5% had a female householder with no husband present, 3.3% had a male householder with no wife present, and 26.9% were non-families. 22.5% of all households were made up of individuals, and 9.1% had someone living alone who was 65 years of age or older. The average household size was 2.41 and the average family size was 2.80.

The median age in the village was 41.1 years. 22.4% of residents were under the age of 18; 6.2% were between the ages of 18 and 24; 25.6% were from 25 to 44; 28.1% were from 45 to 64; and 17.8% were 65 years of age or older. The gender makeup of the village was 49.0% male and 51.0% female.

=== 2000 census ===
As of the census of 2000, there were 1,243 people, 529 households, and 399 families residing in the village. The population density was 356.0 inhabitants per square mile (137.5/km^{2}). There were 737 housing units at an average density of 211.1 per square mile (81.5/km^{2}). The racial makeup of the village was 95.66% White, 0.72% African American, 1.37% Native American, 0.24% Asian, 0.40% from other races, and 1.61% from two or more races. Hispanic or Latino of any race were 1.53% of the population.

There were 529 households, out of which 21.9% had children under the age of 18 living with them, 66.7% were married couples living together, 6.0% had a female householder with no husband present, and 24.4% were non-families. 19.5% of all households were made up of individuals, and 6.6% had someone living alone who was 65 years of age or older. The average household size was 2.34 and the average family size was 2.62.

In the village, the population was spread out, with 18.3% under the age of 18, 5.8% from 18 to 24, 25.5% from 25 to 44, 33.0% from 45 to 64, and 17.4% who were 65 years of age or older. The median age was 45 years. For every 100 females, there were 98.9 males. For every 100 females age 18 and over, there were 99.8 males.

The median income for a household in the village was $40,833, and the median income for a family was $43,077. Males had a median income of $35,188 versus $27,115 for females. The per capita income for the village was $23,324. About 7.8% of families and 11.3% of the population were below the poverty line, including 18.7% of those under age 18 and 1.1% of those age 65 or over.
