= Wateren =

- Hamlet
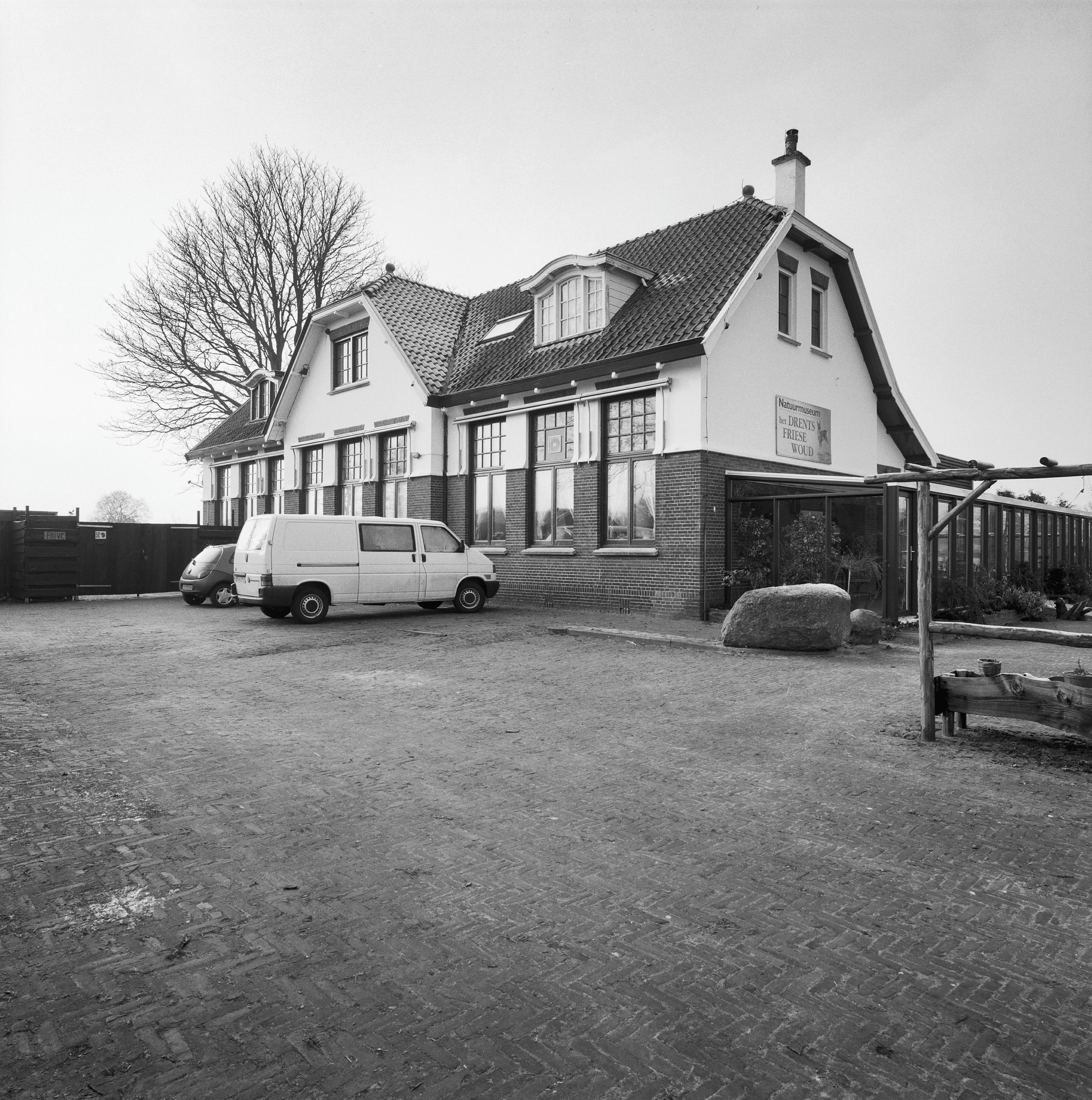
- Former school in Wateren

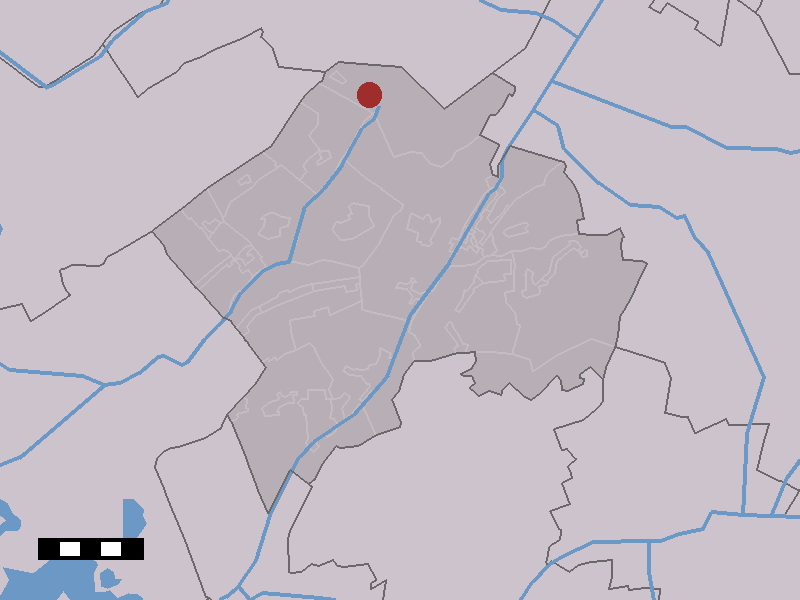
- Wateren in the municipality of Westerveld.

- Location in the province of Drenthe Wateren (Netherlands)
- Coordinates: 52°54′36″N 6°16′54″E
- Country: Netherlands
- Province: Drenthe
- Municipality: Westerveld
- Time zone: UTC+1 (CET)
  - Summer (DST): UTC+2 (CEST)
- Postal code: 8438
- Dialing code: 0521

Wateren is a hamlet in the Dutch province of Drenthe. It is a part of the municipality of Westerveld, and lies about 22 km (14 mi) west of the provincial capital Assen.

It was first mentioned in 1408 as van Wachthorn. The etymology is unclear. The hamlet contains about 60 houses.
