= Broomfield Township, Michigan =

- Civil township
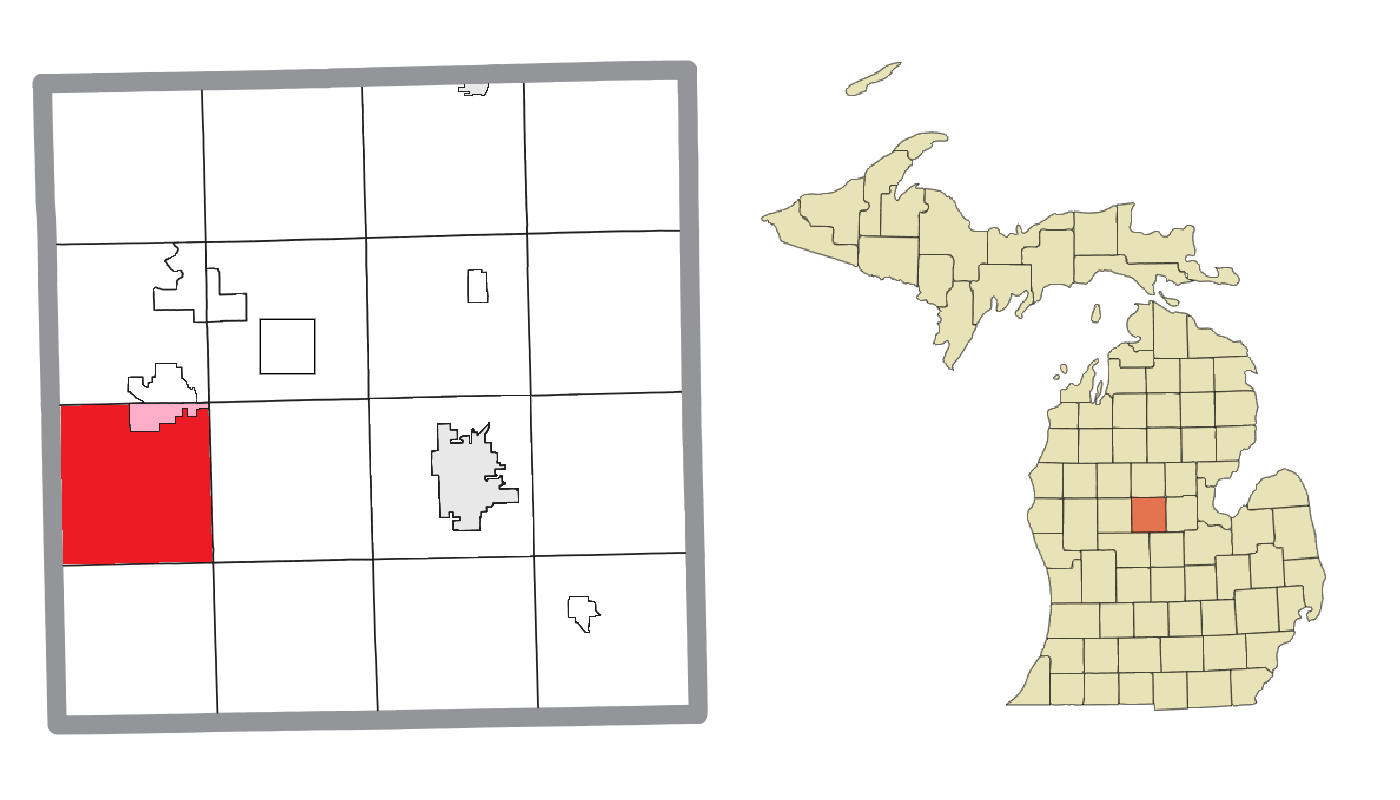
- Location within Isabella County (red) and a portion of the administered village of Lake Isabella (pink)

- Location within the state of Michigan Broomfield Township (the United States)
- Coordinates: 43°35′48″N 85°01′34″W
- Country: United States
- State: Michigan
- County: Isabella

Area
  - Total: 35.7 sq mi (92.5 km^{2})
  - Land: 34.9 sq mi (90.4 km^{2})
  - Water: 0.81 sq mi (2.1 km^{2})
- Elevation: 1,040 ft (317 m)

Population (2020)
  - Total: 1,857
  - Density: 53.2/sq mi (20.5/km^{2})
- Time zone: UTC-5 (Eastern (EST))
  - Summer (DST): UTC-4 (EDT)
- ZIP code(s): 48858, 48893, 49310, 49340
- Area code: 989
- FIPS code: 26-11140
- GNIS feature ID: 1625990

Broomfield Township is a civil township of Isabella County in the U.S. state of Michigan. As of the 2020 census, the township population was 1,857.

== History ==
Broomfield Township was organized in 1866. There was a village named Bundy in the township from about 1870 until 1897. It was largely a lumbering village.

== Communities ==
- The village of Lake Isabella is at the northern boundary of the township, partially within Broomfield Township and partially in Sherman Township.
- Broomfield Center is an unincorporated community near the center of the township at 43°35′45″N 85°01′36″W

== Geography ==
According to the United States Census Bureau, the township has a total area of 35.7 square miles (92 km^{2}), of which 34.9 square miles (90 km^{2}) is land and 0.8 square miles (2.1 km^{2}) (2.27%) is water.

== Demographics ==
As of the census of 2000, there were 1,620 people, 618 households, and 451 families residing in the township. The population density was 46.4 inhabitants per square mile (17.9/km^{2}). There were 737 housing units at an average density of 21.1 per square mile (8.1/km^{2}). The racial makeup of the township was 95.00% White, 1.42% African American, 1.17% Native American, 0.25% Asian, 0.06% Pacific Islander, 1.11% from other races, and 0.99% from two or more races. Hispanic or Latino of any race were 2.10% of the population.

There were 618 households, out of which 31.2% had children under the age of 18 living with them, 61.7% were married couples living together, 7.9% had a female householder with no husband present, and 26.9% were non-families. 19.7% of all households were made up of individuals, and 5.2% had someone living alone who was 65 years of age or older. The average household size was 2.60 and the average family size was 2.98.

In the township the population was spread out, with 24.7% under the age of 18, 8.5% from 18 to 24, 27.1% from 25 to 44, 25.8% from 45 to 64, and 13.9% who were 65 years of age or older. The median age was 38 years. For every 100 females, there were 95.4 males. For every 100 females age 18 and over, there were 97.1 males.

The median income for a household in the township was $36,711, and the median income for a family was $40,234. Median income for Males is $31,523 and for females $21,696. The per capita income for the township was $17,227. About 9.9% of families and 15.1% of the population were below the poverty line, including 20.6% of those under age 18 and 13.2% of those age 65 or over.
