= Boston Terrier =

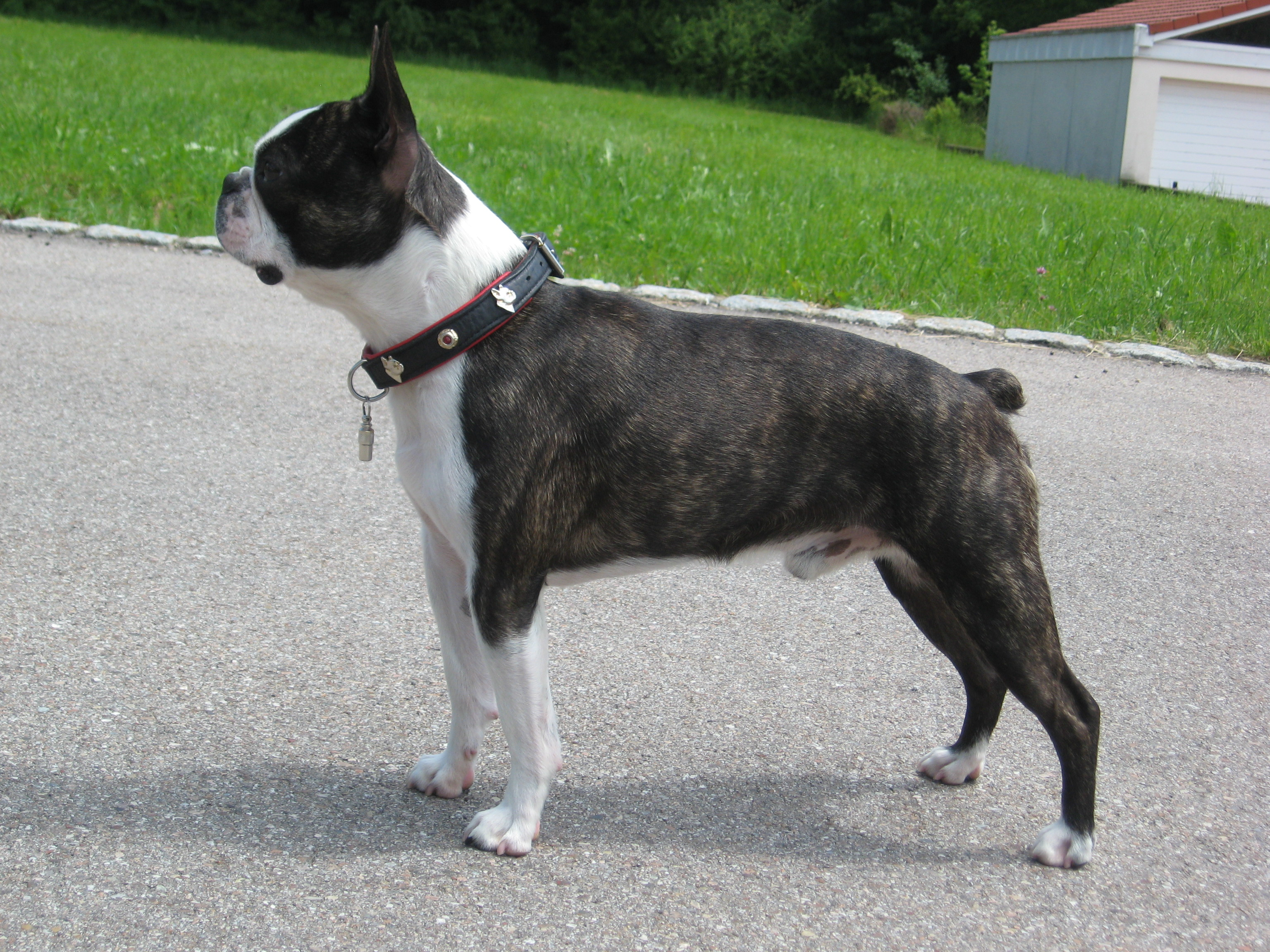
- Boston Terrier with a black brindle coat
- Other names: Boston Bull; Boston Bull Terrier; Boxwood; American Gentleman
- Origin: United States
Traits
- Height: 9–15 in (23–38 cm)
- Weight: 6–25 lb (3–11 kg)
- Coat: Short, smooth and slick
- Color: Brindle with white; Seal with white; Black with white
- Litter size: 1–6 puppies
Kennel club standards
- American Kennel Club: standard
- Fédération Cynologique Internationale: standard
- Notes: State dog of Massachusetts

The Boston Terrier is a breed of dog originating in the United States of America. It was accepted in 1893 by the American Kennel Club as a non-sporting breed. The dogs are small and compact, with a short tail and erect ears.

The Boston Terrier ranked as the 23rd-most registered breed with the American Kennel Club in 2024.

== History ==
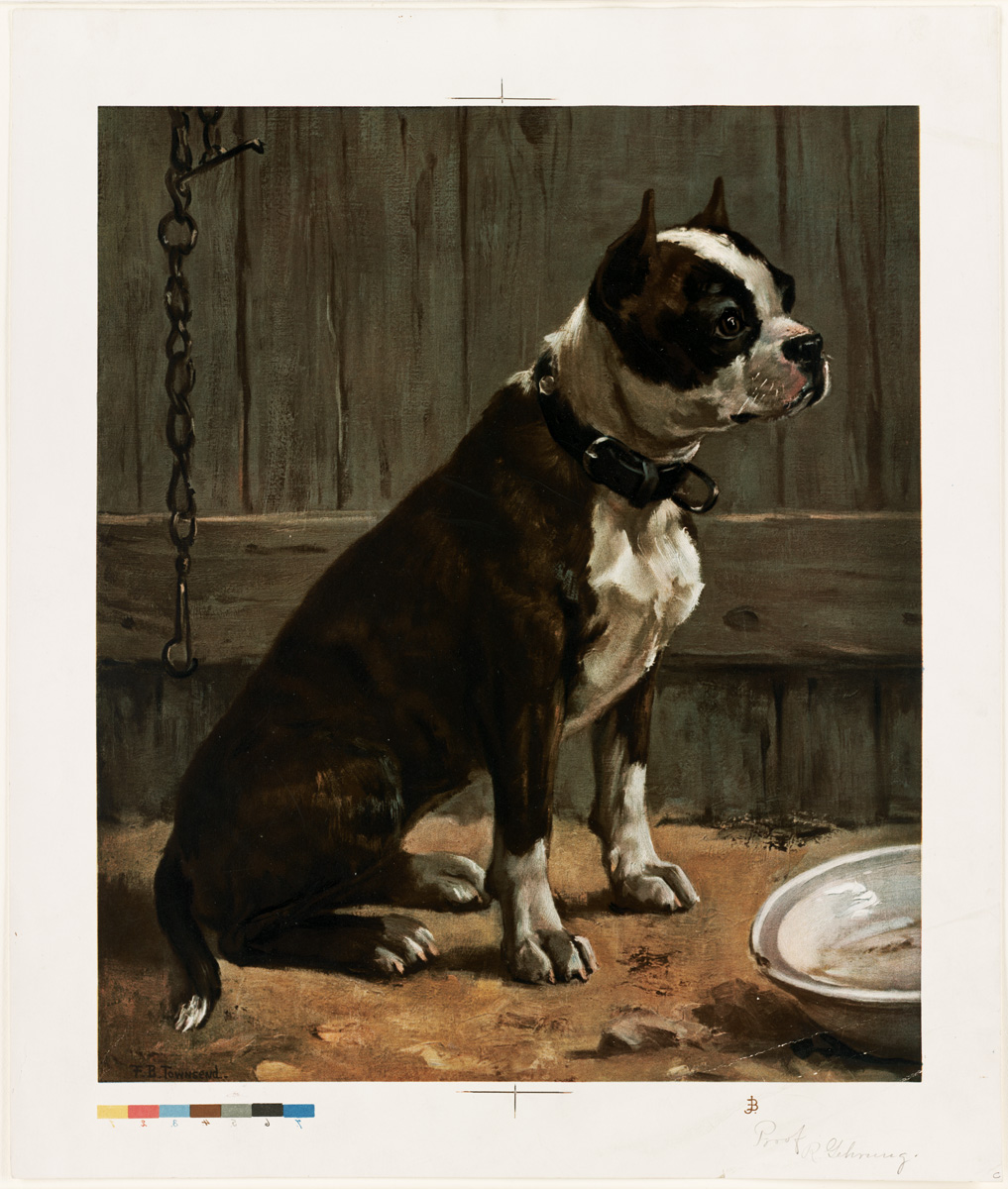
Terrier Seated (Old Boston Bulldog) by Frances B. Townsend, Boston Public Library, 19th century

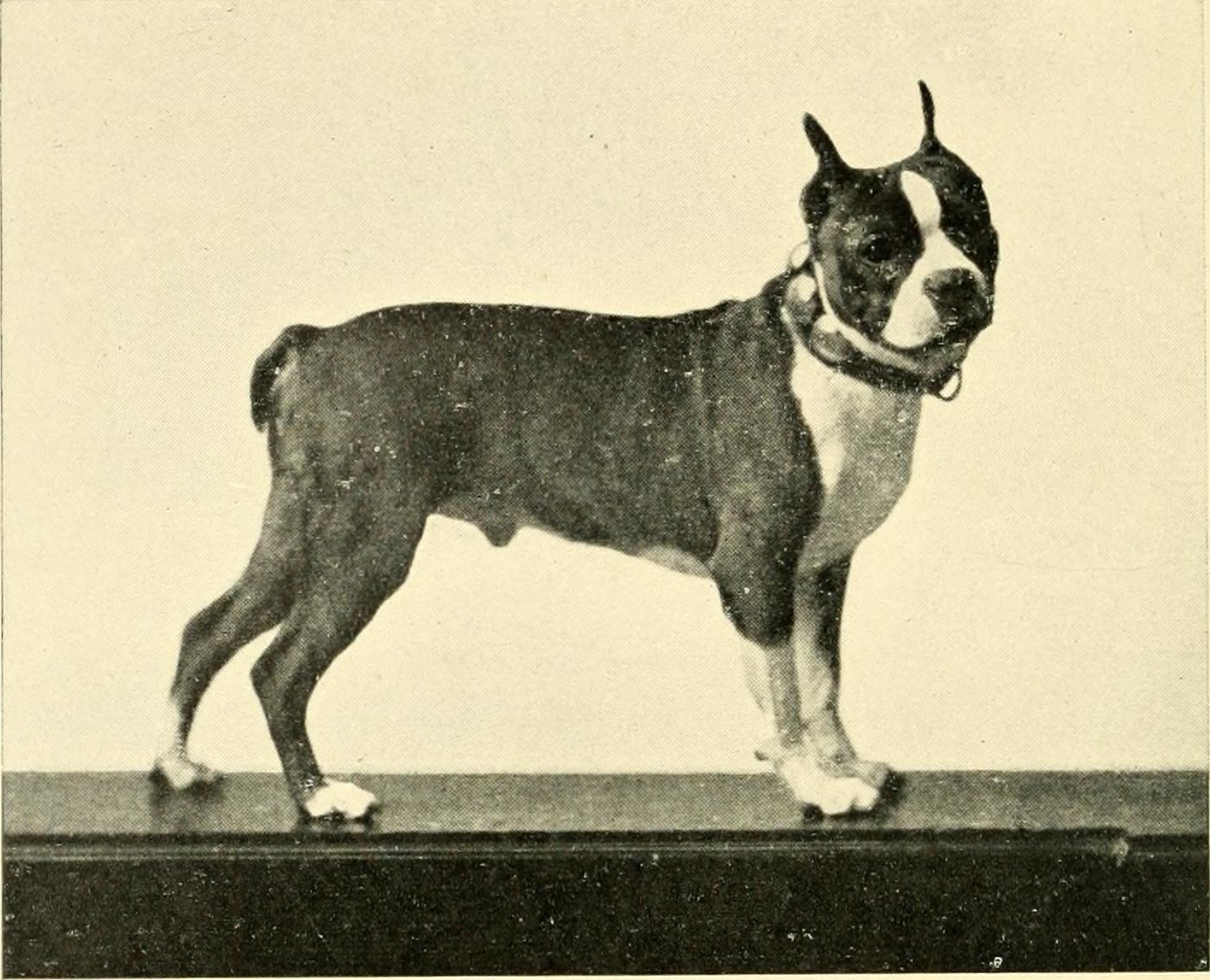
A Boston Terrier ante 1904.

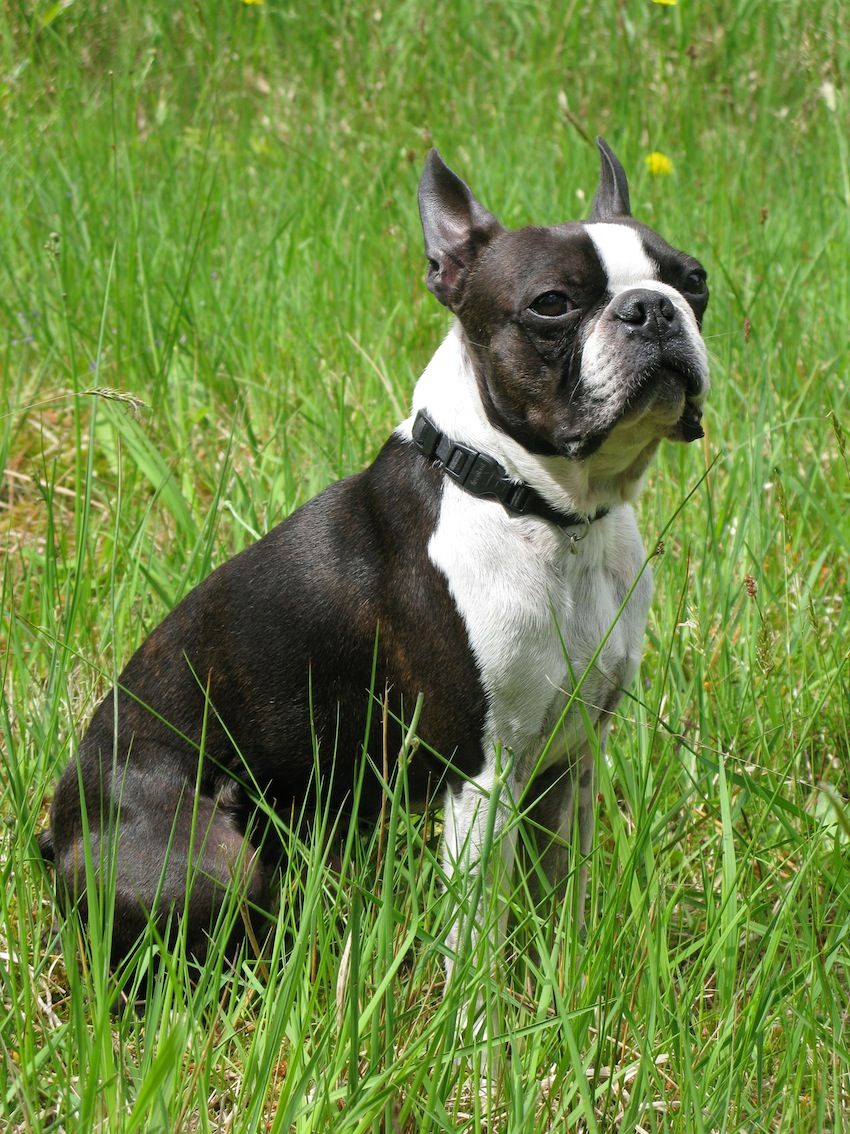
A young male Boston Terrier with a Brown brindle coat

The Boston terrier breed originated around 1870, when Robert C. Hooper of Boston purchased from a man named William O'Brien a dog named Judge (known later as Hooper's Judge), which was of a bull and terrier type lineage. Hooper's Judge is directly related to the original bull and terrier breeds of the 19th and early 20th centuries. The American Kennel Club cites Hooper's Judge as the ancestor of nearly all true modern Boston Terriers.

Judge weighed about 32 pounds (15 kg). Judge was bred to Edward Burnett's bitch named Gyp (or Kate). Gyp was a white bulldog-type female, owned by Edward Burnett, of Southboro, Massachusetts. She weighed about 20 pounds (9.1 kg), was stocky and strong and had the typical blocky head now shown in Bostons. From this foundation of the breed, subsequent breeders refined the breed into its modern-day presentation. Bred down in size from fighting dogs of the bull and terrier types, the Old Boston Bulldogs, a direct ancestor of the Boston Terrier, originally weighed up to 44 pounds (20 kg).

The Boston Terrier Club was formed in 1891; it was admitted to membership in the American Kennel Club in 1893. It is one of a small number of breeds to have originated in the United States.

In the early years, the color and markings were not very important to the breed's standard. By the 20th century the breed's distinctive markings and color were written into the standard, becoming an essential feature. The Boston Terrier has lost most of its aggressive nature, preferring the company of humans, although some males will still challenge other dogs if they feel their territory is being invaded. Boston University has used Rhett the Boston Terrier as their mascot since 1922. The Boston Terrier has also been the official state dog of Massachusetts since 1979.

== Description ==
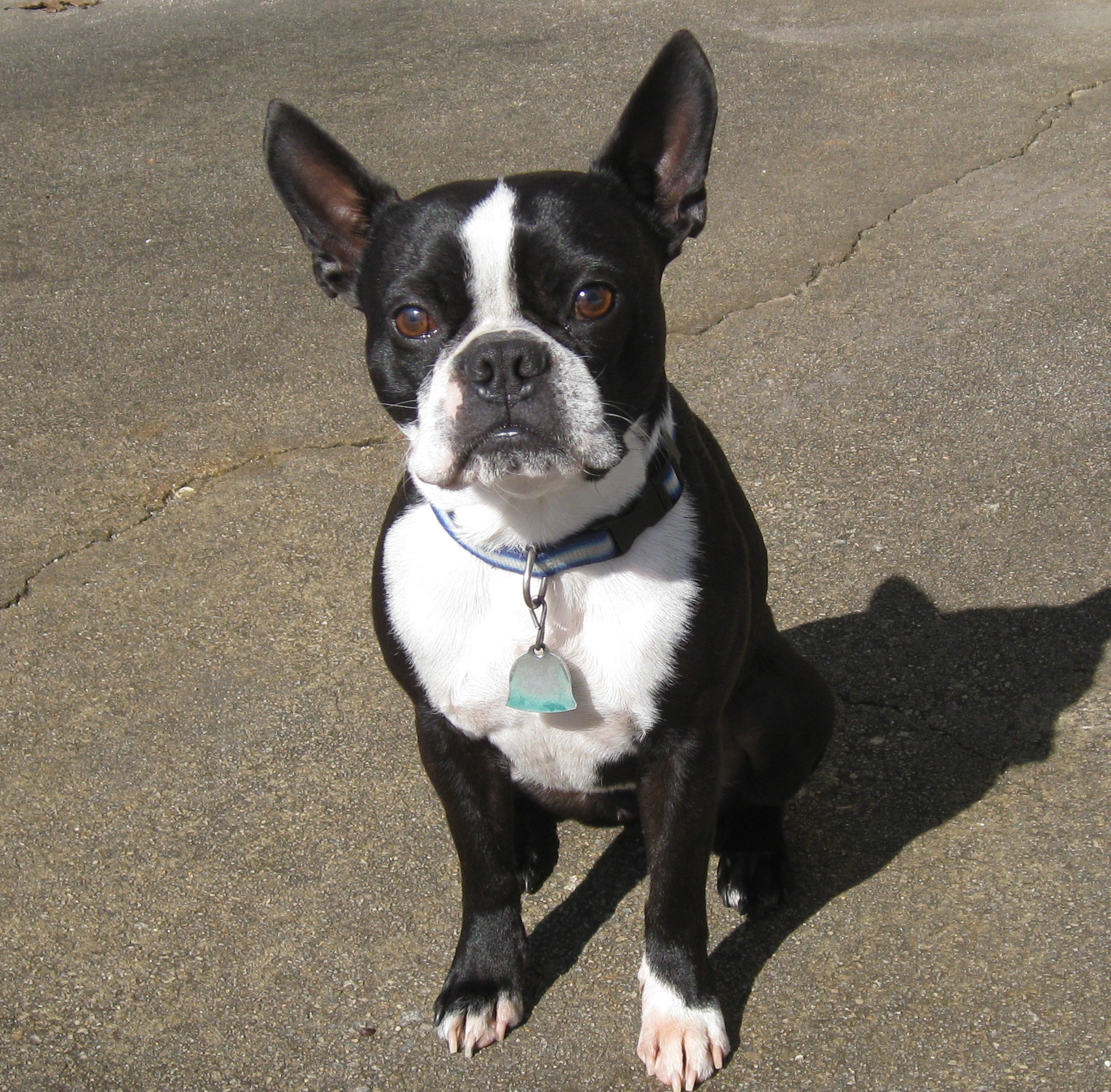
An adult male Boston Terrier with a black coat

The Boston Terrier is a compactly built, well-proportioned dog. It has a square-looking head with erect ears and a slightly arched neck. The muzzle is short and generally wrinkle-free, with an even or a slightly undershot bite. The chest is broad and the tail is short. According to international breed standards, the dog should weigh no more than 25 pounds (11 kg). Boston Terriers usually stand up to 15–17 inches (380–430 mm) at the withers.

The American Kennel Club divides the breed into three classes: under 15 pounds, 15 pounds and under 20 pounds, 20 pounds and not exceeding 25 pounds.

=== Coat and color ===
The Boston Terrier is characteristically marked with white in proportion to either black, brindle, seal (seal appears as black with a red cast in lighting), or a combination of the three. Solid colors and colors not mentioned are not accepted by the breed standard. According to the American Kennel Club, the Boston Terrier's markings are broken down into two categories: Required: which consists of a white chest, white muzzle band, and a white band between the eyes; and Desired: which includes the Required markings plus a white collar, white on the forelegs, up to the hocks on the rear legs. For conformation showing, symmetrical markings are preferred. Due to the Boston Terrier's markings resembling formal wear, in addition to its refined and pleasant personality, the breed is commonly referred to as "the American Gentleman."

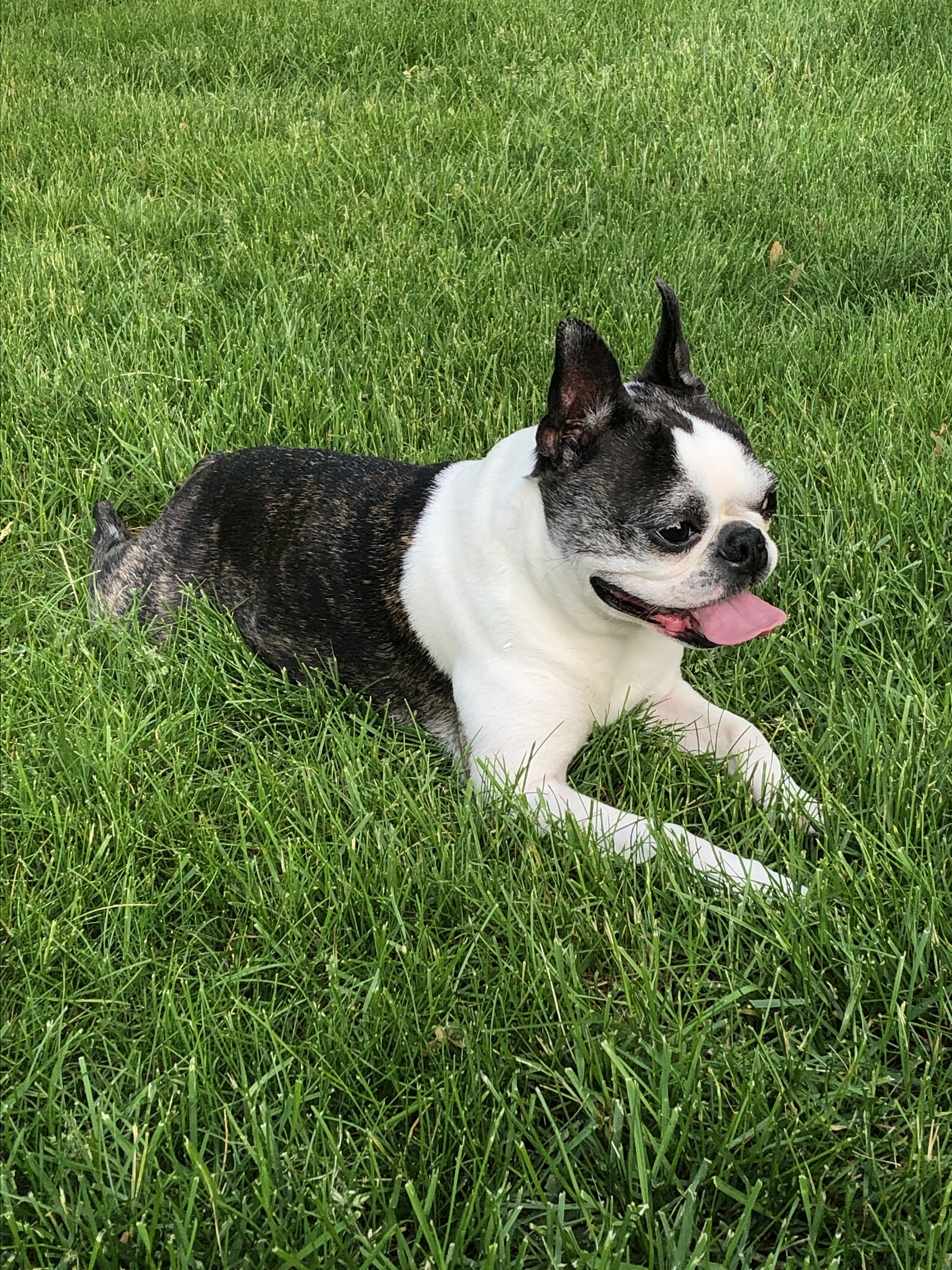
An adult female Boston Terrier with a brindle coat

=== Notable features ===
The Boston Terrier's large, prominent pair of eyes is a distinguishable feature. The breed's round eyes are set widely apart, are large in size, and located squarely in the skull.

The breed's genetic makeup produces a short tail. These short tails can take the shape of a corkscrew, or curl, or they can be straight. Generally, Boston Terriers' tails do not exceed 2 inches (51 mm) in length.

== Temperament ==
Boston Terriers are generally eager to please their owner and can be easily trained.

Both females and males are generally quiet and bark only when necessary. Their usually sensible attitude toward barking makes them excellent choices for apartment dwellers. They enjoy being around people, get along well with children, the elderly, other canines, and non-canine pets, if properly socialized.

== Health ==
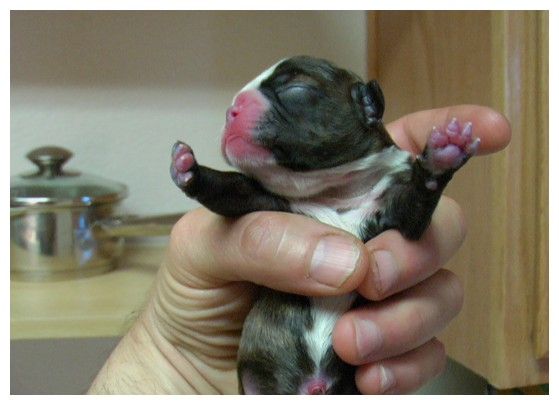
A newborn Boston Terrier

A 2024 UK study found a life expectancy of 11.8 years for the breed compared to an average of 12.7 for purebreeds and 12 for crossbreeds.

Curvature of the back, called roaching, might be caused by patella problems with the rear legs, which in turn causes the dog to lean forward onto the forelegs.

The Boston Terrier is a brachycephalic breed of dog. Brachycephaly refers to the shortened muzzle of the breed which results in a pushed-in appearance of the face. Brachycephaly results in deformation of the upper airway tract and leads to obstruction of breathing. Effects of brachycephaly are stridor, stertorous breathing, emesis, skin fold dermatitis, brachycephalic airway obstructive syndrome, exophthalmos, pharyngeal gag reflex, cyanosis, and laryngeal collapse. Other issues arising from brachycephaly are risk of complications whilst under anaesthesia, and hyperthermia — with the latter caused due to an inability to effectively reduce body temperature via panting.

Bostons frequently require caesarean section to give birth, with over 80% of litters in a UK Kennel Club survey delivered this way. A UK study found Boston Terrier bitches to be 12.9 times more likely to experience dystocia.

The breed is predisposed to the following dermatological conditions: atopic dermatitis, allergic skin disease, demodicosis, hyperadrenocorticism, mast cell tumour, pattern alopecia, and zinc-responsive dermatosis.

A study in North America of veterinary records of almost 10,000 Boston Terriers and over 1,000,000 dogs found 0.36% of Boston Terriers to have hip dysplasia compared to 3.52% overall.

The Boston Terrier is one of the most commonly affected breeds for hereditary cataracts.

== Popular Boston Terriers ==
In 1921 at a ceremony to commemorate the United States' 102nd Infantry, the U.S. Army awarded a gold medal to an honorable war dog: Sergeant Stubby. The Boston Bull Terrier, possessing three service stripes and one wound stripe, was given a rank in the U.S. Army-making him the first dog to ever earn it. The comforting, protective war dog was also rewarded a medal by France. Sergeant Stubby died in 1926 with the legacy of being the United States' "greatest war dog."

Since 2003, Wofford College in Spartanburg, South Carolina, has had a live Boston Terrier mascot named Blitz that attends home football games.

In 2012, a high school student named Victoria Reed took the advice of her veterinarian and submitted a photo of her Boston Terrier, Bruschi, to Guinness World Records. With each eye being 1.1 inches, or 28 mm, in diameter, Bruschi is recognized by Guinness to be the dog with the largest eyes.

Lennu, the pet from 2012 to 2021 of Sauli Niinistö, the President of Finland, was present at many of his less formal appearances and well known in Finland. Photos of the pair went viral in the United States in 2017.
