= Isabella Township, Michigan =

- Civil township
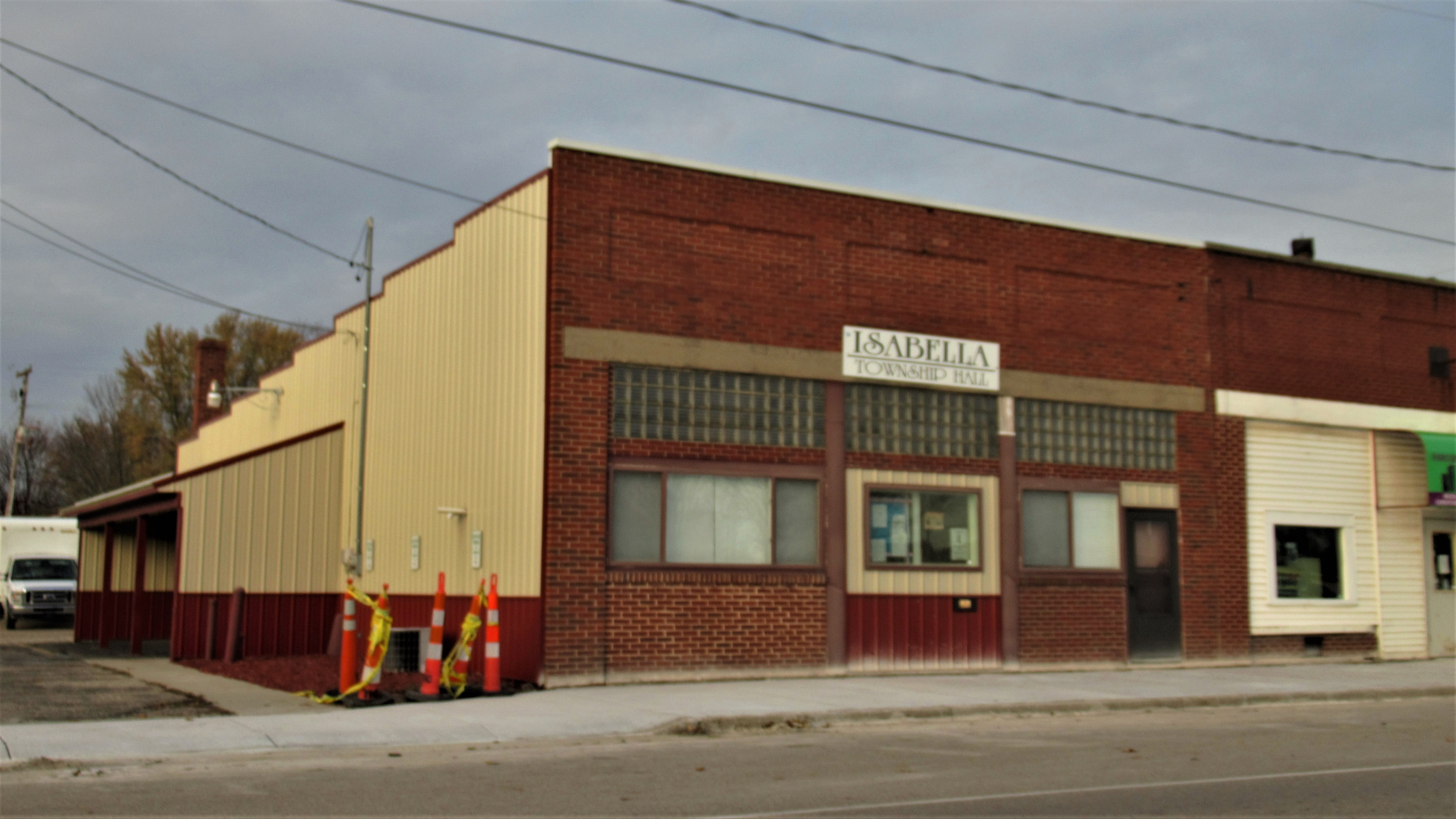
- Isabella Township Hall in Rosebush

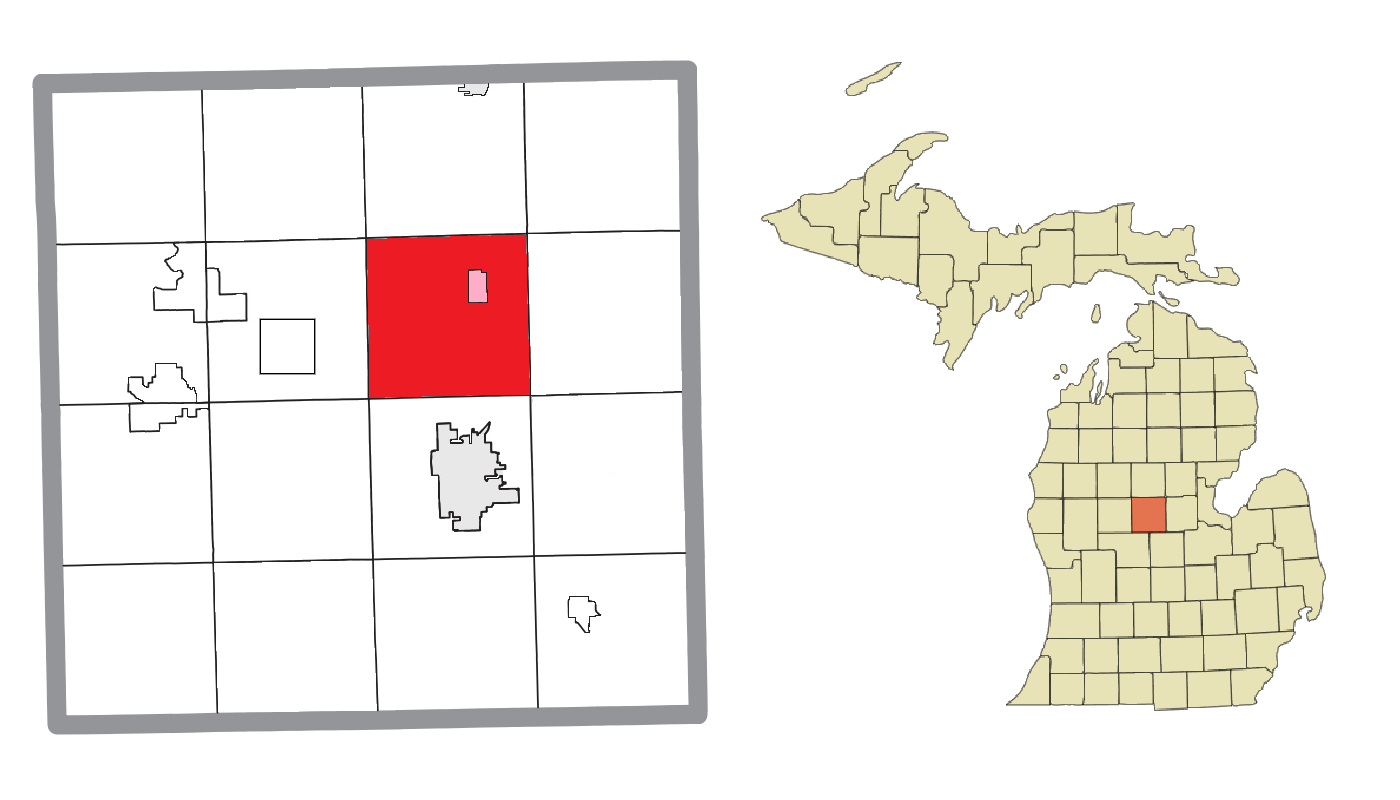
- Location within Isabella County (red) and the administered village of Rosebush (pink)

- Location within the state of Michigan Location within the United States
- Coordinates: 43°41′01″N 84°47′12″W
- Country: United States
- State: Michigan
- County: Isabella

Government
  - Supervisor: Rick Ervin
  - Clerk: Kristin Derby

Area
  - Total: 36.38 sq mi (94.22 km^{2})
  - Land: 36.32 sq mi (94.07 km^{2})
  - Water: 0.081 sq mi (0.21 km^{2})
- Elevation: 771 ft (235 m)

Population (2020)
  - Total: 2,096
  - Density: 57.7/sq mi (22.3/km^{2})
- Time zone: UTC-5 (Eastern (EST))
  - Summer (DST): UTC-4 (EDT)
- ZIP code(s): 48858 (Mount Pleasant); 48878 (Rosebush)
- Area code: 989
- FIPS code: 26-41160
- GNIS feature ID: 1626531
- Website: Official website

Isabella Township is a civil township of Isabella County in the U.S. state of Michigan. The population was 2,096 at the 2020 census.

== Communities ==
- The village of Rosebush is within the township, and the Rosebush post office, with ZIP code 48878, also serves the northern portion of Isabella Township.
- The city of Mount Pleasant is nearby to the south, and the Mount Pleasant post office, with ZIP code 48858, also serves the southern portion of Isabella Township.

== Geography ==
According to the U.S. Census Bureau, the township has a total area of 36.4 square miles (94 km^{2}), of which 0.04 square mile (0.1 km^{2}, 0.05%) is water.

== Demographics ==
As of the census of 2000, there were 2,145 people, 787 households, and 569 families residing in the township. The population density was 59.0 inhabitants per square mile (22.8/km^{2}). There were 836 housing units at an average density of 23.0 per square mile (8.9/km^{2}). The racial makeup of the township was 95.80% White, 0.61% African American, 2.56% Native American, 0.28% Asian, 0.28% from other races, and 0.47% from two or more races. Hispanic or Latino of any race were 0.98% of the population.

There were 787 households, out of which 37.6% had children under the age of 18 living with them, 59.1% were married couples living together, 9.9% had a female householder with no husband present, and 27.7% were non-families. 21.6% of all households were made up of individuals, and 7.4% had someone living alone who was 65 years of age or older. The average household size was 2.72 and the average family size was 3.15.

In the township the population was spread out, with 28.4% under the age of 18, 9.4% from 18 to 24, 29.5% from 25 to 44, 21.7% from 45 to 64, and 11.0% who were 65 years of age or older. The median age was 35 years. For every 100 females, there were 93.2 males. For every 100 females age 18 and over, there were 91.6 males.

The median income for a household in the township was $36,573, and the median income for a family was $43,661. Males had a median income of $33,558 versus $25,111 for females. The per capita income for the township was $16,995. About 6.3% of families and 9.6% of the population were below the poverty line, including 10.7% of those under age 18 and 13.5% of those age 65 or over.
