= Grace McArthur =

Michigan-based folk painter (1899–1986)

Grace H. McArthur
- Born: Grace Helen Bell; March 15, 1898; Detroit, Michigan, United States
- Died: October 17, 1986 (aged 88); Mount Pleasant, Michigan, United States
- Resting place: Woodland Cemetery; 43.68750°N 84.78806°W
- Style: Folk painting
- Spouse: Stewart C. McArthur

Grace McArthur (1899–1986) was a Michigan-based folk artist known for the top-to-bottom oil paintings she created later in life.

== Biography ==
Grace Helen Bell was born to Nellie Larges and Wilhelm Bell in Detroit, Michigan, on March 15, 1898. Grace married then-medical student Stewart Coyles McArthur in 1916 in Detroit. The pair lived there just long enough to have two children, before moving north to the Mount Pleasant area in the village of Rosebush.

Little is known about her life from this point until she began painting at the age of 50. Grace McArthur created hundreds of folk oil paintings in Michigan between 1948 and 1973. She never painted the same scene twice, and would always refuse if a customer requested an identical copy of one of her previous paintings.

Grace McArthur died October 17, 1986, in Mount Pleasant, Michigan, when she was 87. She is buried at Woodland Cemetery in Rosebush, next to her husband Dr. Stewart McArthur, who died seven years later in 1993. Her headstone features an icon of a painting palette, and his features a caduceus.

== Career ==
Grace did not begin painting until the age of 50, after she developed an allergy related to the ceramics she had enjoyed working with all her life. Faced with the sudden need to find a new artistic passion, she took several painting classes from local artist Virginia Seites. After the first painting she created won an award at an art show in Saginaw and her art teacher encouraged her unique style, Grace began taking painting more seriously. She eventually retired from art around 1973, when she was 75. One of her final paintings was a collection of everyone who had been important to her life, painted on an extra large canvas titled that she titled My World. (About this painting, to date, it has gone missing or was stolen, from a family members storage space.)

McArthur's folk art focused on bustling scenes of rural country life. She painted bright, top-to-bottom images full of people, animals, buildings, and nature, with little negative space in between. Grace included several recognizable, repeated motifs in many of her paintings. One can spot a red brick schoolhouse, children playing ring around the rosie, a boy chasing his runaway dog, and a small American flag in nearly all of McArthur's paintings.

Her sense of humor is often seen in her work, as she painted dogs running away from their owners or truck drivers operating their steering wheels from the wrong side of their vehicles. One of her paintings featured a man slipping on a banana peel while an onlooking woman dramatically covers her ears, presumably in an attempt to drown out the foul language coming from the mouth of the banana peel's victim.

=== Collections ===
Grace McArthur created a 23-inch x 27-inch oil painting of the Botsford Inn in Farmington Hills, Michigan in the early 1960s. The painting was given to the inn's director in 1963 when the property was recognized officially as a historic landmark. The author of a book written for the sesquicentennial of the hotel described the painting in 1986 as follows:

"Over the fireplace is a 'Centennial' depiction of the inn, painted in the style of Grandma Moses by Grace McArthur, who visited Botsford on weekends. The painting depicts the inn as it could have been in the 1880s and 1890s, according to the imagination of the artist."

— Jean M. Fox, More Than a Tavern: 150 Years of Botsford Inn

The painting hung above the fireplace in the Botsford Inn for several decades before it sold in a private auction in the early 2000s.

Though she is credited with hundreds of paintings, until recently, only one Grace McArthur painting is known to be on public display as of 2022. Created in 1959, the large oil painting titled Mount Pleasant Four Corners hangs prominently in the Chippewa River District Library in Mount Pleasant, Michigan. Another painting is hanging in the Doherty Hotel, at the top of the stairs of the lobby area, in Clare, Michigan. The painting is of the hotel and Clare, area downtown. Also, just recently, as of March of 2026, a donation of her painting, "Memories of my Childhood in Detroit" was donated to the MSU Gallery. It is now in residing in their permanent collection for the public to see when they show it. This painting depicts a typical day of downtown area that she remembers from the early 1900's. With wagons, horses, a Model-T Ford, small houses and business, people milling about and shopping in various stores. This painting is full of humor and life, as is most usually found in her paintings. The donation was made by her granddaughter who owned the painting for 64 years, as it was originally a gift to Grace's daughter, Doris Vivian, in 1960.

=== Notability ===
A winter scene painted by McArthur titled Christmas in the Country served as the cover of the December 1972 edition of Ford Motor Company's publication, Ford Times.

Several of Grace McArthur's works were featured in a 2018 episode of America's Antiques Roadshow. Filmed at Meadow Brook Hall in Rochester, Michigan, the episode included a $2,000 valuation for six original oil paintings by McArthur.
