= Ford Times =

- Frequency: Monthly
- Format: Digest
- First issue: April 15, 1908 - 1917
- Final issue: 1943 - January 1993
- Company: Ford
- Country: United States
- Based in: Dearborn, Michigan
- Language: English
- ISSN: 0015-7015

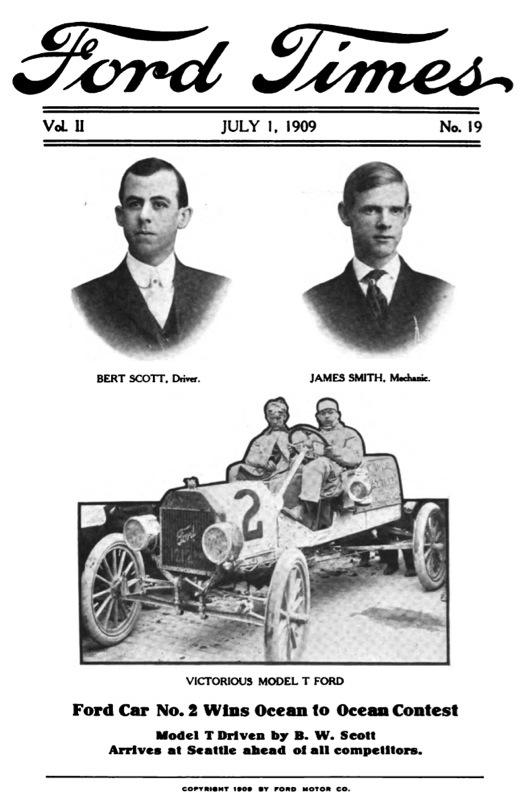
Ford Times cover, July 1, 1909

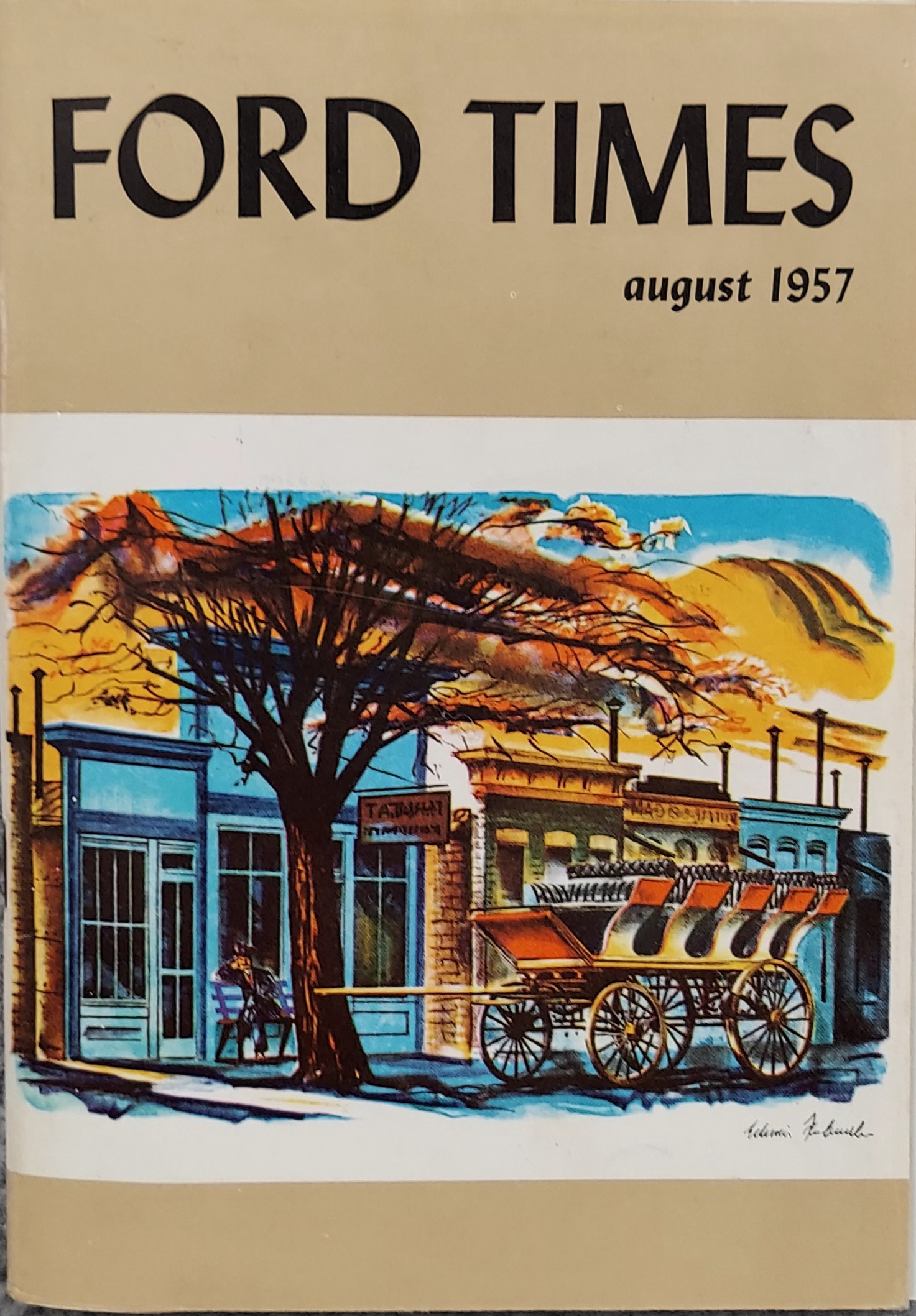
Ford Times cover, August 1957

Ford Times was a monthly publication produced by Ford Motor Company. The first issue was published on April 15, 1908, until April 1917, ceasing publication with America's entry into World War I. After a more than 20-year break, Ford Times resumed publishing in 1943. This iteration of the magazine would last 50 years until January 1993. The magazines were similar to Reader's Digest and Yankee. Ford Times magazines were 4x6 inches in size and later 5x7 inches in size. Each issue usually consisted of several stories about destinations for sports or vacations or of historic interest, by such writers as Edward Ware Smith, Corey Ford, Bernard De Voto, and Edward Weeks as well as promotional information about current Ford vehicles. Early issues were monochrome. Issues in the 1950s and 1960s featured many paintings. Arthur Lougee was the art director then of both the Ford company's New England Journeys, Ford Times and Lincoln Mercury Times. He featured in these publications dozens of America's contemporary watercolor artists such as John Whorf, Henry McDaniel, Forrest Orr, Glenn MacNutt, Loring Coleman, Stuart Eldridge, Paul Sample, King Coffin, Maxwell Mays, Robert Paul Thorpe, Estelle Coniff, WD Hartley, Glen Krause, JWS Cox, C Robert Perrin, Edward Turner, Ward Cruickshank II, Alphonse J Shelton, RJ Holden, Dorothy Manuel, Frederick James, William Barss, Campbell Tinning, Eunice Utterback, Andrew Winter. Paintings by Charley Harper and Henry E McDaniel were often on the covers. Mount Pleasant-based folk artist Grace McArthur contributed an oil painting for the cover of the December 1972 edition.

== Ford Times Cookbooks ==
A few cookbooks with recipes from past issues of Ford Times were produced.

== Ford Truck Times ==
Ford also produced a series of Truck Times magazines, released quarterly. These were slightly larger, and contained stories that revolved around trucks, as well as information about camping and vacation destinations similar to the regular Ford Times magazines.

== Ford From the Road ==
In early 2025, Ford introduced From the Road, a digital channel that drew inspiration from the Ford Times, according to a column by Chief Communications Officer Mark Truby. Ford currently publishes a U.S. and European edition.
