= Rosebush, Michigan =

- Village
- Village of Rosebush
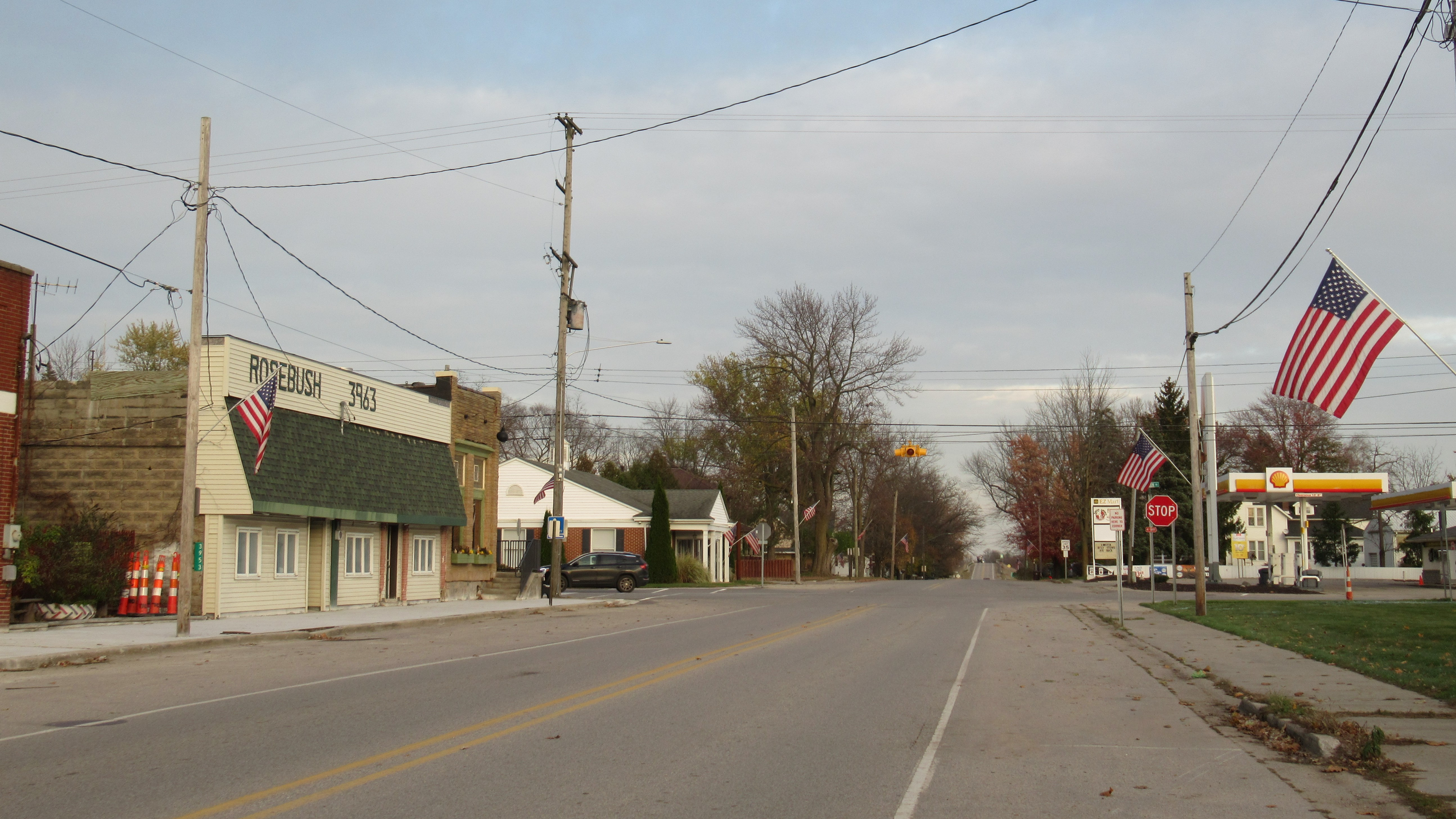
- Looking east along E. Rosebush Road

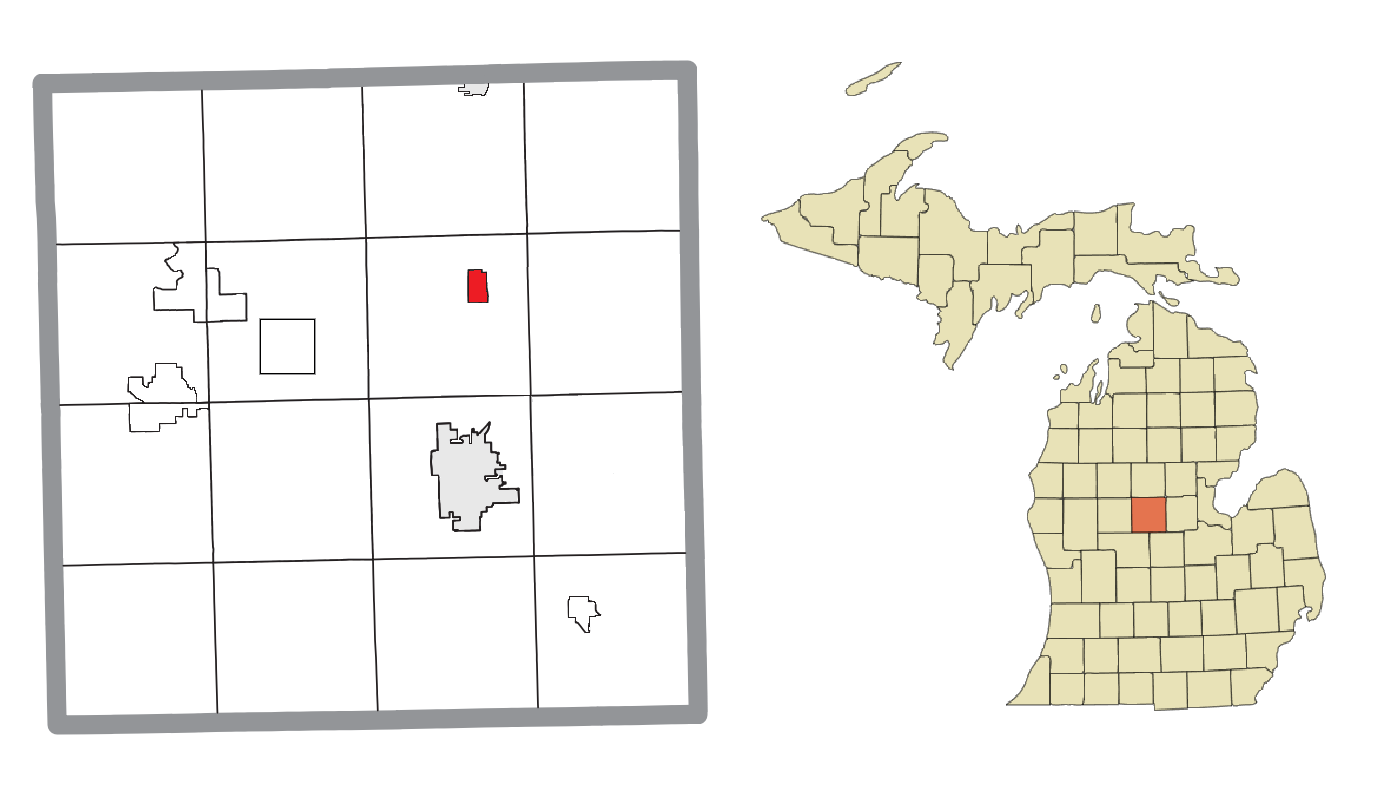
- Location within Isabella County

- Location within the state of Michigan Location within the United States
- Coordinates: 43°41′57″N 84°46′4″W
- Country: United States
- State: Michigan
- County: Isabella
- Township: Isabella
- Settled: 1844
- Platted: 1868

Government
  - Type: Village council
  - President: Margaret Anderson

Area
  - Total: 0.89 sq mi (2.31 km^{2})
  - Land: 0.89 sq mi (2.31 km^{2})
  - Water: 0 sq mi (0.00 km^{2})
- Elevation: 781 ft (238 m)

Population (2020)
  - Total: 353
  - Density: 396.63/sq mi (153.14/km^{2})
- Time zone: UTC-5 (Eastern (EST))
  - Summer (DST): UTC-4 (EDT)
- ZIP code(s): 48878
- Area code: 989
- FIPS code: 26-69640
- GNIS feature ID: 0636218

Rosebush is a village in Isabella County in the U.S. state of Michigan. The population was 353 at the 2020 census. The village is within Isabella Township, and is also entirely within the Isabella Indian Reservation, home to the federally-recognized Saginaw Chippewa Tribal Nation.

== History ==
Rosebush began in 1844 when Cornelius Bogan started a general store. He called the town Halfway because it was approximately halfway between Clare and Mount Pleasant. In 1868, the Ann Arbor Railroad came through the area and resident James Bush, while officially platting the land, bartered with the railroad some of his property for the right to have the station named after his wife, Rose. An addition to the community was later platted in 1873 by Elias B. Calkins and named Calkinsville – this was the name of the original post office on July 9, 1873. The post office name was changed to Rosebush in 1889, back to Calkinsville in 1890 and once again Rosebush on February 19, 1903. The name has remained unchanged since.

== Geography ==
According to the U.S. Census Bureau, the village has a total area of 0.89 square miles (2.31 km^{2}), all land.

=== Major highways ===
- US 127 forms the eastern boundary of the village and has one access point at exit 149 (Rosebush Road).

== Demographics ==
Historical population
| Census | Pop. | Note | %± |
|---|---|---|---|
| 1970 | 439 | | — |
| 1980 | 336 | | −23.5% |
| 1990 | 333 | | −0.9% |
| 2000 | 379 | | 13.8% |
| 2010 | 368 | | −2.9% |
| 2020 | 353 | | −4.1% |
U.S. Decennial Census

=== 2010 census ===
As of the census of 2010, there were 368 people, 170 households, and 89 families residing in the village. The population density was 413.5 inhabitants per square mile (159.7/km^{2}). There were 186 housing units at an average density of 209.0 per square mile (80.7/km^{2}). The racial makeup of the village was 88.6% White, 1.1% African American, 3.8% Native American, 1.4% from other races, and 5.2% from two or more races. Hispanic or Latino of any race were 6.3% of the population.

There were 170 households, of which 21.2% had children under the age of 18 living with them, 34.7% were married couples living together, 11.8% had a female householder with no husband present, 5.9% had a male householder with no wife present, and 47.6% were non-families. 42.9% of all households were made up of individuals, and 17.1% had someone living alone who was 65 years of age or older. The average household size was 2.13 and the average family size was 2.91.

The median age in the village was 39 years. 19.8% of residents were under the age of 18; 14% were between the ages of 18 and 24; 22.9% were from 25 to 44; 26.3% were from 45 to 64; and 17.1% were 65 years of age or older. The gender makeup of the village was 44.6% male and 55.4% female.

=== 2000 census ===
As of the census of 2000, there were 379 people, 145 households, and 95 families residing in the village. The population density was 437.6 inhabitants per square mile (169.0/km^{2}). There were 156 housing units at an average density of 180.1 per square mile (69.5/km^{2}). The racial makeup of the village was 96.31% White, 2.11% African American, 0.53% Native American, 0.53% from other races, and 0.53% from two or more races. Hispanic or Latino of any race were 2.90% of the population.

There were 145 households, out of which 37.2% had children under the age of 18 living with them, 45.5% were married couples living together, 17.2% had a female householder with no husband present, and 33.8% were non-families. 23.4% of all households were made up of individuals, and 6.9% had someone living alone who was 65 years of age or older. The average household size was 2.58 and the average family size was 3.02.

In the village, the population was spread out, with 30.1% under the age of 18, 10.6% from 18 to 24, 31.4% from 25 to 44, 16.9% from 45 to 64, and 11.1% who were 65 years of age or older. The median age was 32 years. For every 100 females, there were 89.5 males. For every 100 females age 18 and over, there were 84.0 males.

The median income for a household in the village was $31,111, and the median income for a family was $35,250. Males had a median income of $31,083 versus $25,000 for females. The per capita income for the village was $14,041. About 12.1% of families and 20.4% of the population were below the poverty line, including 29.8% of those under age 18 and 13.5% of those age 65 or over.

== Images ==
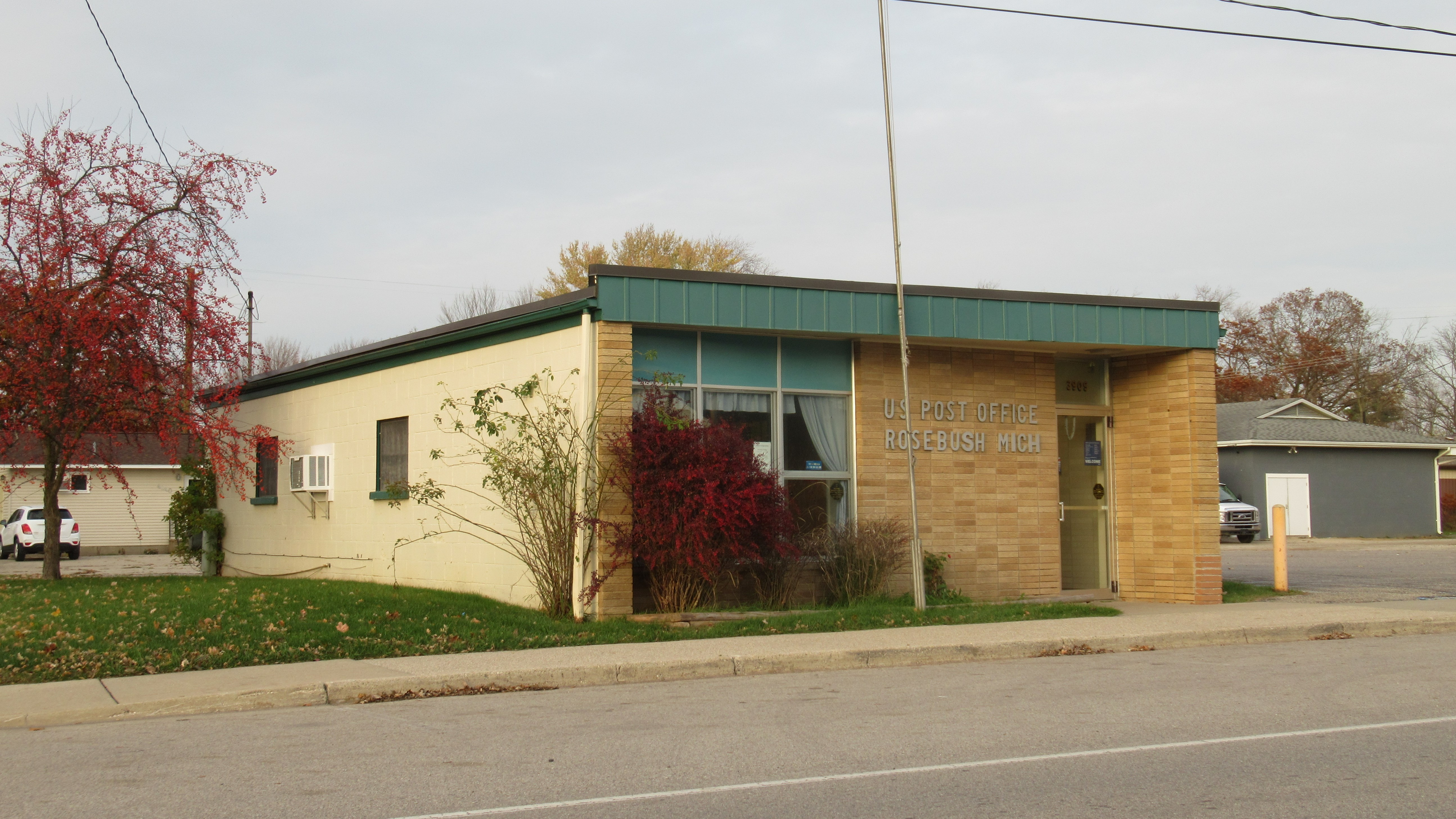
U.S. Post Office in Rosebush

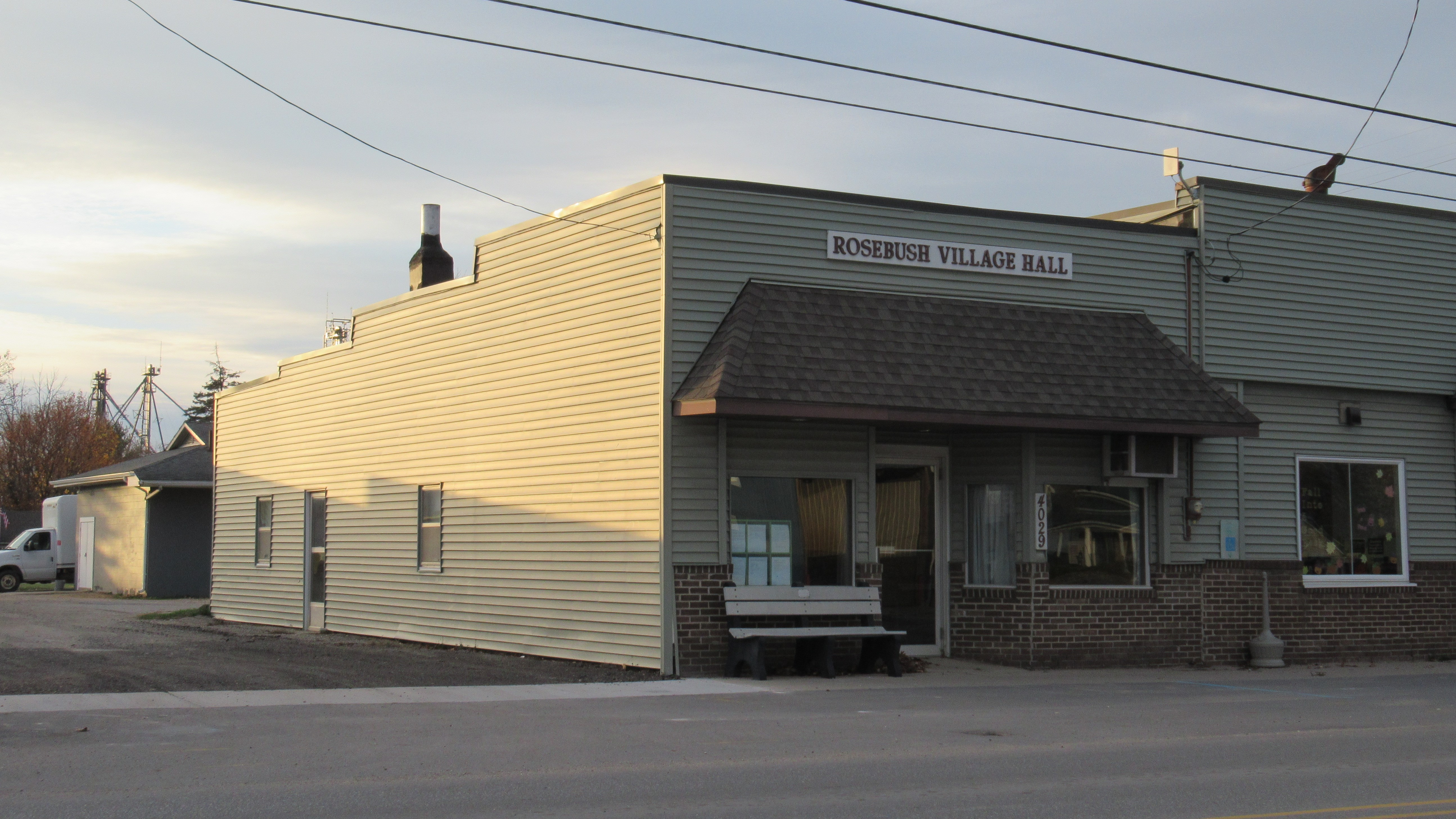
Rosebush Village Hall
