= Botsford Inn =

- U.S. National Register of Historic Places
- Michigan State Historic Site
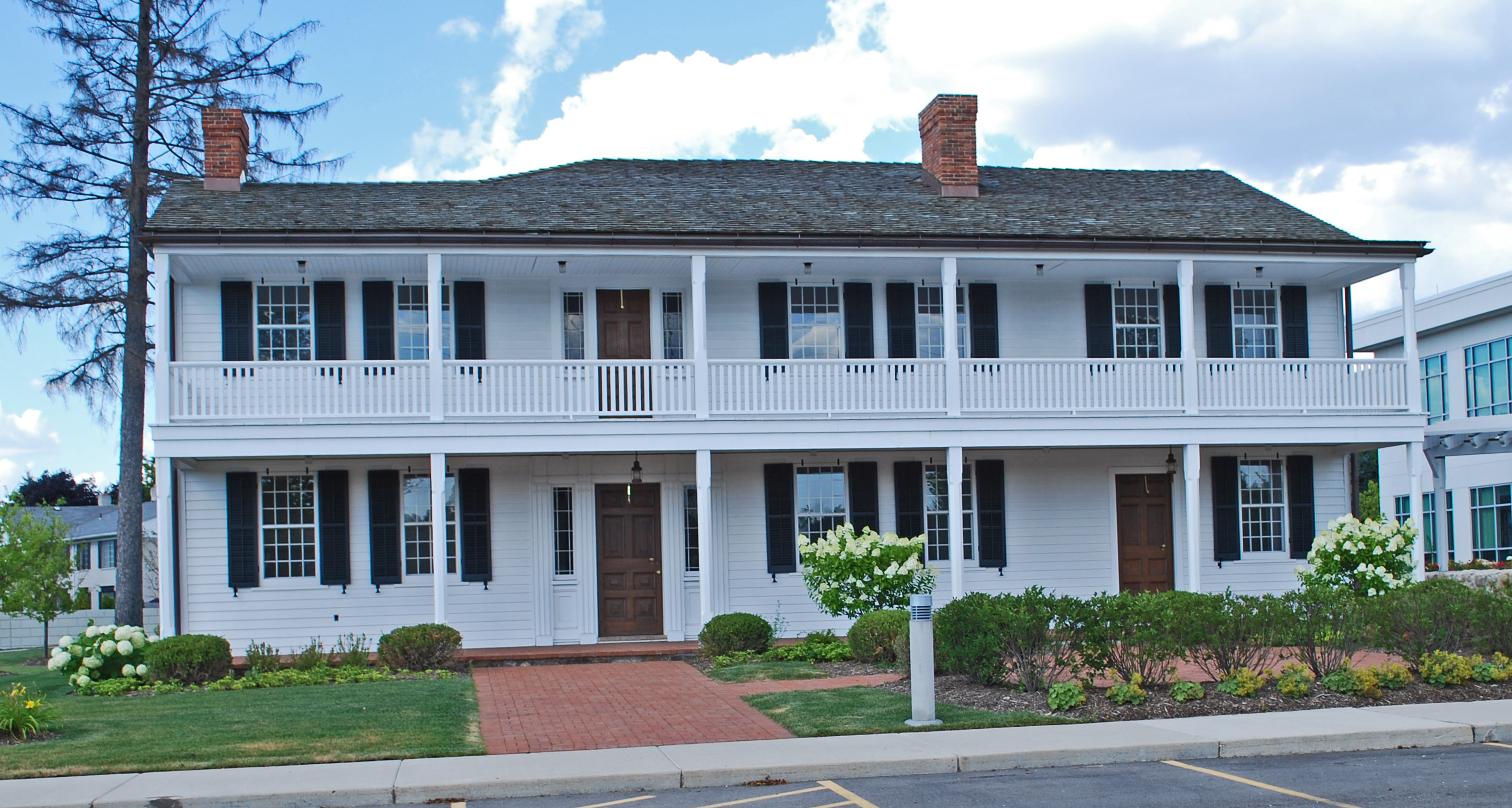
- Interactive map
- Location: 28000 Grand River Ave., Farmington, Michigan
- Coordinates: 42°26′38″N 83°19′23″W
- Area: 9.4 acres (3.8 ha)
- Built: 1836
- Architectural style: Federal, Late Federal vernacular
- NRHP reference No.: 79003173
- Added to NRHP: September 19, 1979

The Botsford Inn is a nineteenth century inn and tavern located at 28000 Grand River Avenue in Farmington, Michigan. It was listed on the National Register of Historic Places in 1979.

== History ==
In 1836, Orrin Weston, a farmer, constructed the original portion of this inn as his personal residence on Grand River Road in what was then the newly platted village of Livonia City. In 1841, Stephen Jennings purchased the house and converted it into a tavern. The building served as a stagecoach stop on what was then the Grand River Plank Road, connecting Detroit to Lansing and Grand Rapids. Jennings likely enlarged the house at this time, adding a rear ell and two bays onto the previously extant structure. In 1860, Milton C. Botsford purchased the inn, renaming it the Botsford Tavern. The Tavern served as a popular meeting place for farmers, drovers, local residents and travelers. By 1880, the village of Livonia City had changed its name to Clarenceville.

The Botsford family owned the inn until the 1920s. At that time, Grand River Avenue was being widened to create U.S. Route 16, and the inn was in danger of being razed. However, in 1924, Henry Ford purchased the Inn from the Botsford family and moved it back from its original site out of the way of the road widening project. Ford had attended gatherings at the inn when he was younger, and had courted his wife Clara there. Ford rehabilitated the structure, enlarging the ell and installing period woodwork.

The Ford family continued to operate the Botsford Inn as a restaurant until 1951, when it was purchased by John Anhut. Anhut preserved the interior of the old inn much as the Fords left it, but the popularity of the inn led him to construct several new wings after 1960. While Anhut was owner the Botsford Inn was presented with a painting by Michigan-based folk artist Grace McArthur.

In the mid-1960, a development group purchased much of the property associated with the Inn, constructing Botsford Hospital and House of Botsford Apartments. However, by the 1990s, economic pressures made it difficult to keep the inn open. In 1993, the Anhut family sold the Inn to Creon Smith. By 2000, the inn had closed. In 2007, Botsford Hospital razed the 1960 wings of the Inn to make room for a new cancer center. The hospital restored the historic portions of the building, and the Inn is now part of the Botsford Hospital complex.

== Description ==
The Botsford Inn is a two-story, seven-bay, flank-gable-roofed, clapboarded structure with a two-story porch across the front. A long, six-bay ell extends to the rear on one side. The original 1836 building consists of the encompasses the five bays on the left-hand side, between the chimneys. The rightmost two bays were likely added in about 1841, at the same time that the front porch was constructed. An elaborate Federal style doorway with sidelights opens on the first story, with a less elaborate doorway directly above.

The interior has much of the original simple trim, including horizontal board wainscoting, plain millwork window and door casings, and several Federal style mantels as well as some wide-board floors. During the 1924 renovation, some excellent reproduction woodwork was installed.

== See also ==
- National Register of Historic Places listings in Oakland County, Michigan
