= Mount Pleasant Downtown Historic District =

Historic district in Michigan, United States

- U.S. National Register of Historic Places
- U.S. Historic district
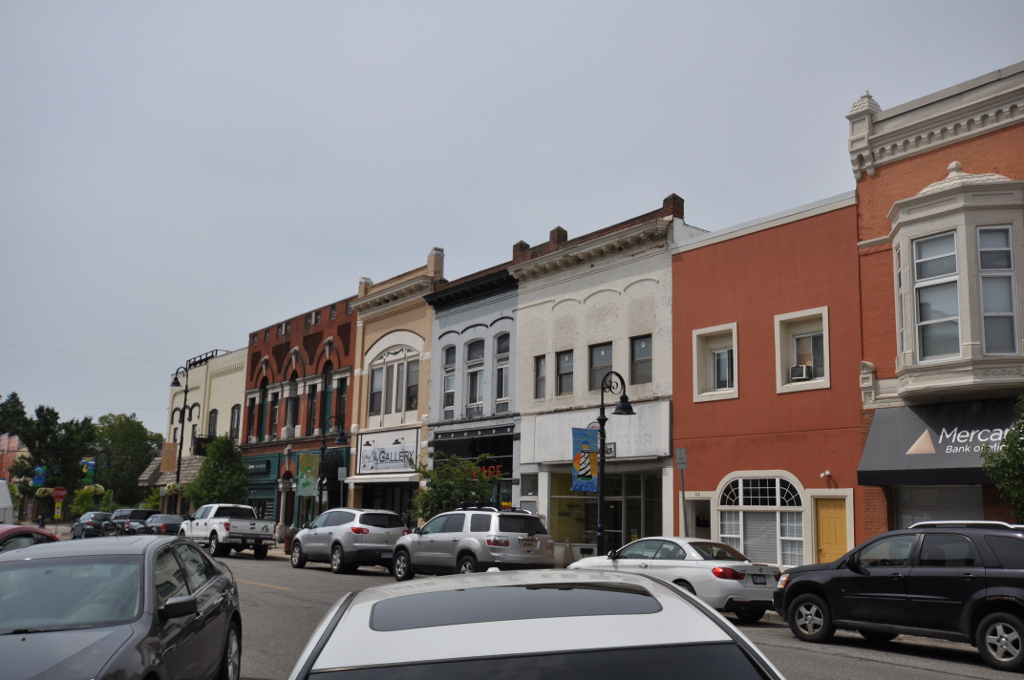
- West side of Main, looking south, 2017

- Location within Michigan Location within the United States
- Interactive map
- Location: Roughly bounded by Mosher, Franklin, Illinois & Washington Sts, Mount Pleasant, Michigan
- Coordinates: 43°36′16″N 84°46′34″W
- Area: 15.73 acres (6.37 ha)
- Architectural style: Commercial, Late Victorian, Italianate, Art Deco, International Style
- NRHP reference No.: 14001043
- Added to NRHP: December 15, 2014

The Mount Pleasant Downtown Historic District is a commercial historic district roughly bounded by Mosher, Franklin, Illinois and Washington Streets in Mount Pleasant, Michigan. It was listed on the National Register of Historic Places in 2014.

== History ==
In 1860, Mount Pleasant was founded as the county seat of Isabella County. It began as a tiny settlement, and the first store was not opened until 1864. However, it rapidly developed, and within a year had a church, a school, and a newspaper. Over the next ten years, a number of other commercial businesses were opened in what is now the downtown area. In 1875, the community incorporated as a village, and also suffered a devastating fire that destroyed almost the entire downtown. However, new buildings were quickly erected, with brick becoming the material of choice rather than frame construction. Another fire swept the village in 1882, prompting the construction of a fire station.

By this time, the commercial district in the city had spread to encompass the block on Broadway between Court and Main (in the heart of current district) and along Main Street between Michigan and the courthouse to the north. Public utilities - water and electricity - were installed in the 1880s, and a number of churches were established. In the downtown area, the Bennett Hotel and Upton Opera House were constructed in the early 1880s. By 1884, there were 2000 residents in Mt. Pleasant, and in 1889 it was incorporated as a city. In 1891, a second hotel with 45 rooms was constructed. More significant commercial buildings were constructed in the downtown area into the 20th century, now almost exclusively of brick.

After the turn of the century, the streetscape began to change, as concrete sidewalks and brick-paved streets were installed. Regular lightposts also appeared. When the Great Depression slowed the nation's economy, the economy of Mt. Pleasant was cushioned considerably due to the discovery of oil fields nearby. The oil boom brought an influx of money into the city in the 1930s, and the prosperity continued through the post-World War II period. In the 1950s, many of the older buildings in the district received mid-century facelifts. Through the rest of the century, the streets and streetscapes were altered, first by paving the streets in asphalt, and later by redirecting traffic flow and redesigning the sidewalk areas. Planters, benches, and historic light posts were also installed.

== Description ==
The Mount Pleasant Downtown Historic District is centered on the intersection of Broadway and Main in Mount Pleasant, and encompasses the surrounding eight blocks. The district contains 70 buildings dating from the 1870s to the 1950s. The building are set close to each other and the sidewalk, and are primarily brick commercial structures of one or two stories (with a few three-story buildings). As buildings were demolished due to fire damage or other reasons, newer structures were built to replace them, resulting in a mingling of various styles throughout the district. Buildings are primarily Italianate and Commercial brick, with some other Late Victorian, Art Deco, and International Style structures mixed in.

The earliest buildings in the district are Italianate structures constructed immediately after the 1875 fire. However, many of these which are still extant, such as the Doughty and Carr and Granger Blocks (100-108 East Broadway), and the Upton Opera House/Isabella County State Bank (200 East Broadway) have had their architectural features obscured by later additions or refurbishments of the facade. However, the oldest building in the district, the 1877 Fancher Block (101-103 E. Broadway) is still architecturally significant, as are the 1879 building at 130 S. Main and the stretch of buildings from 205 to 217 South Main.

Other significant Late Victorian structures, built near the turn of the century, are the Chatterton Block at 118 East Broadway, the Thompson and Dusenbury blocks at 111-119 East Broadway, and the Foster Furniture Company at 102-106 South Main. These structures tend to be more Classical in detail, and include larger plate glass windows on the first floor. As the 1910s and 1920s approached, buildings were constructed more in the Commercial Brick style, and a number of buildings throughout the district are built in this style. Mt. Pleasant also has two significant Art Deco buildings, both of which are theaters: the 1920 Broadway Theater on East Broadway, which features a 1930s era projecting Art Deco marquee, and the 1937 Ward Theater on South Main, with a porcelain enamel façade finished in an Art Deco theme.

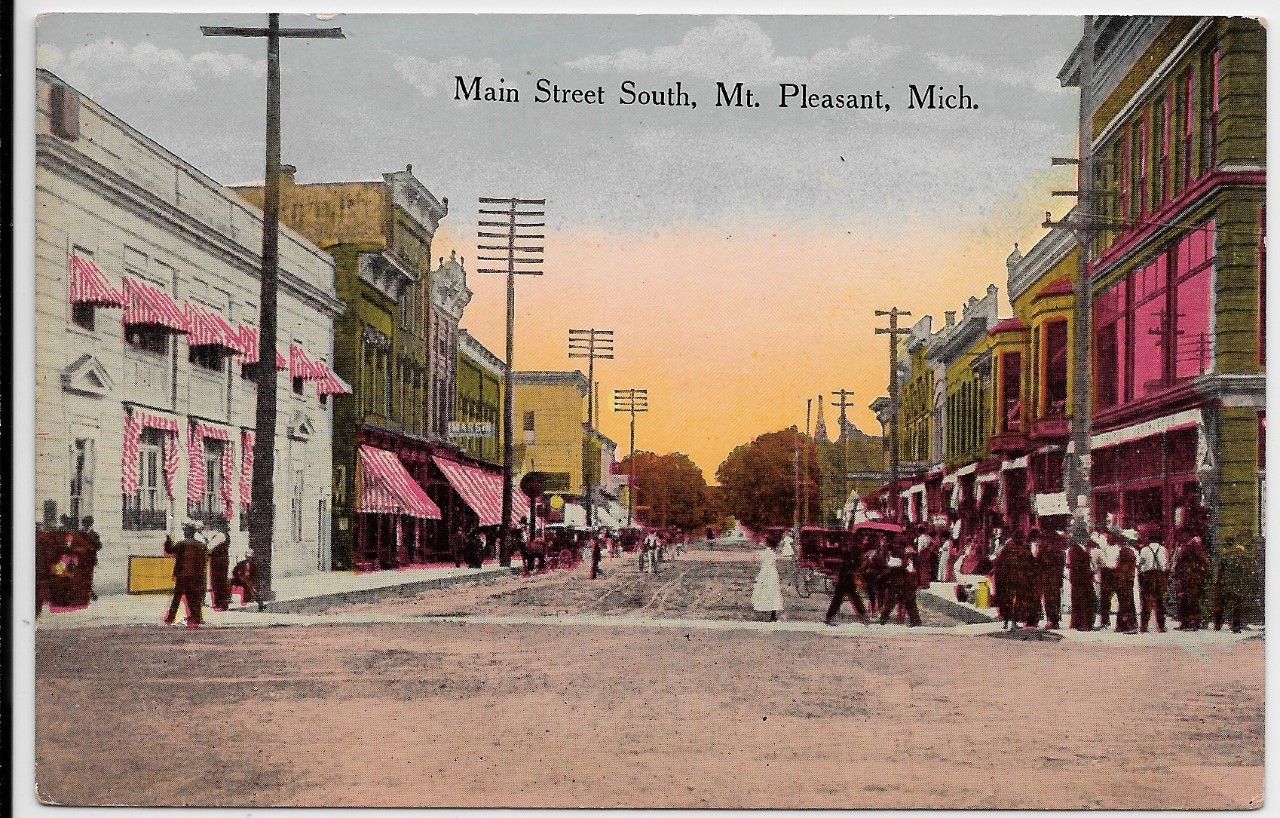
Main Street, looking south, c. 1910

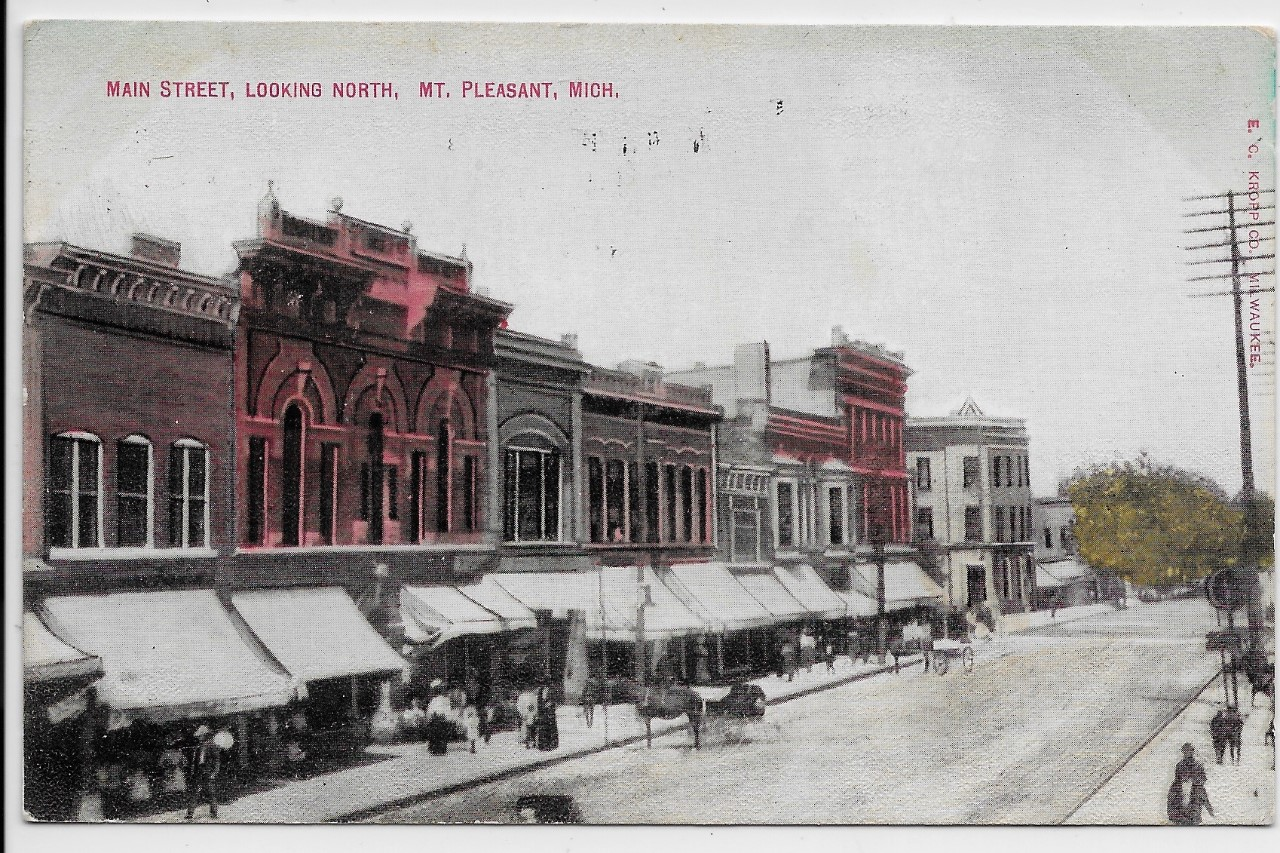
Main Street, looking north, c. 1910

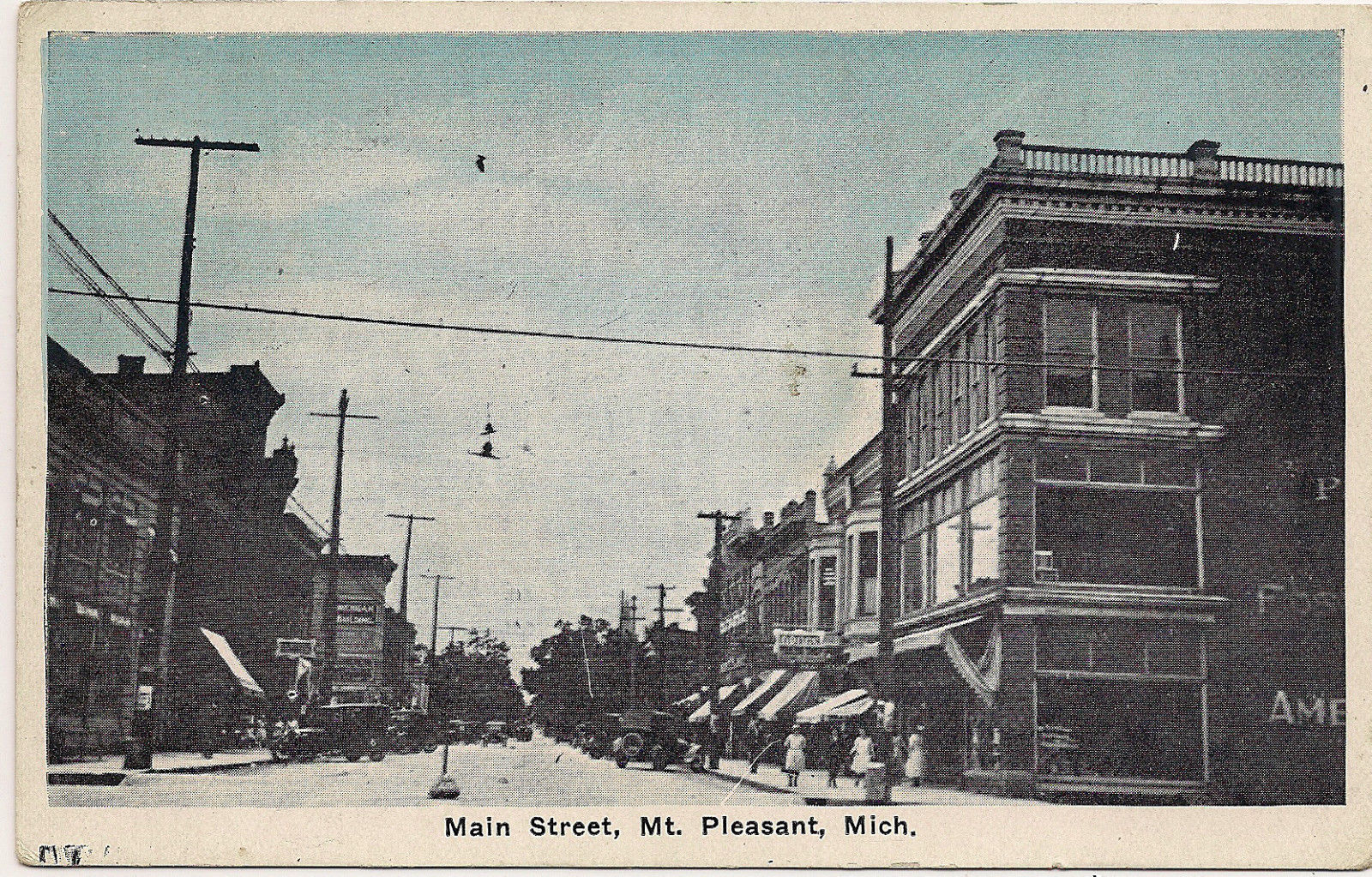
Main Street, looking south, c. 1923

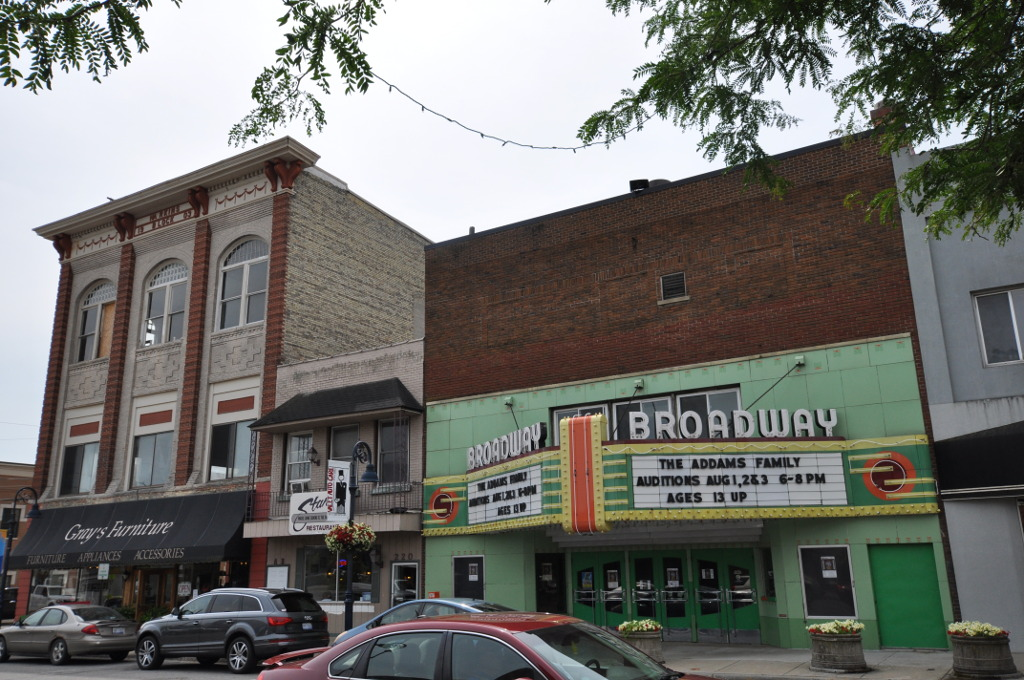
Broadway Theatre, south side of Broadway, 2017

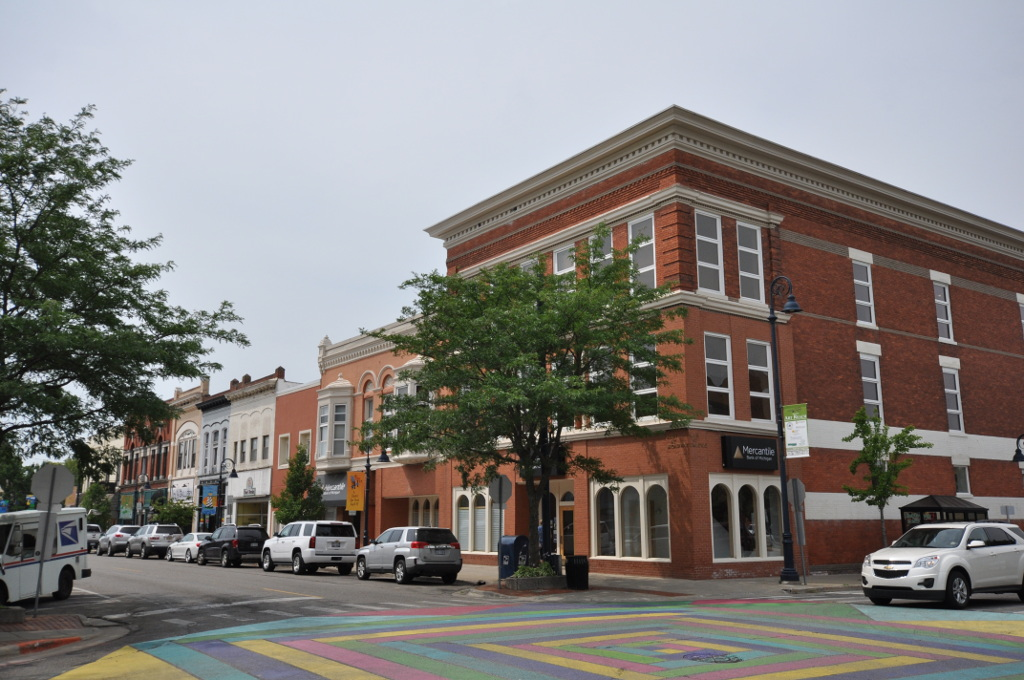
SW corner of Broadway and Main, 2017

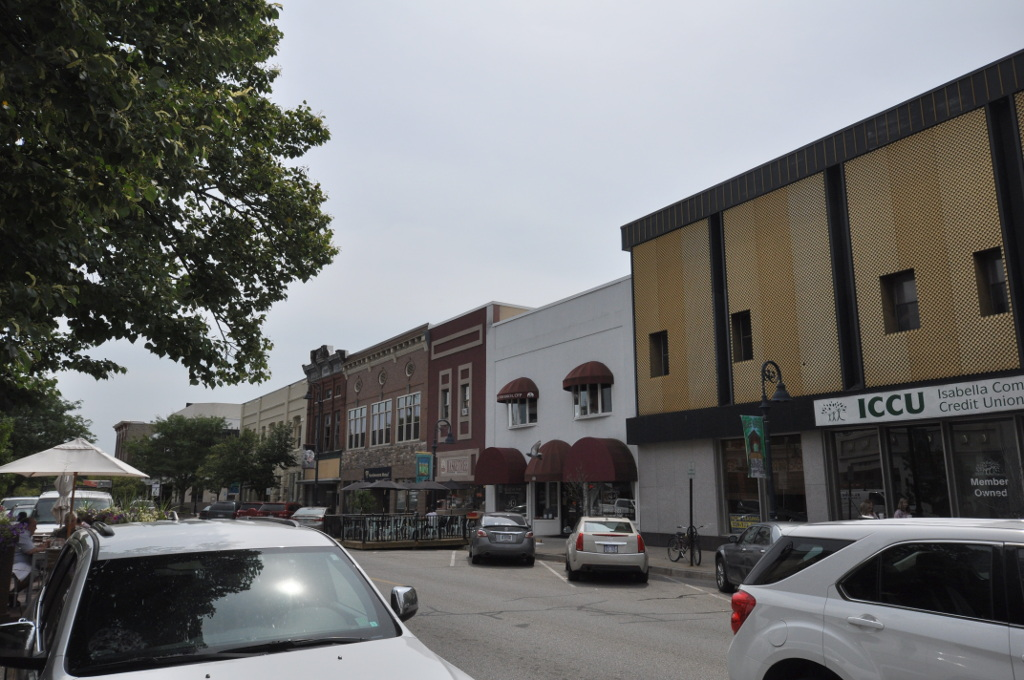
South side of Broadway, looking east, 2017

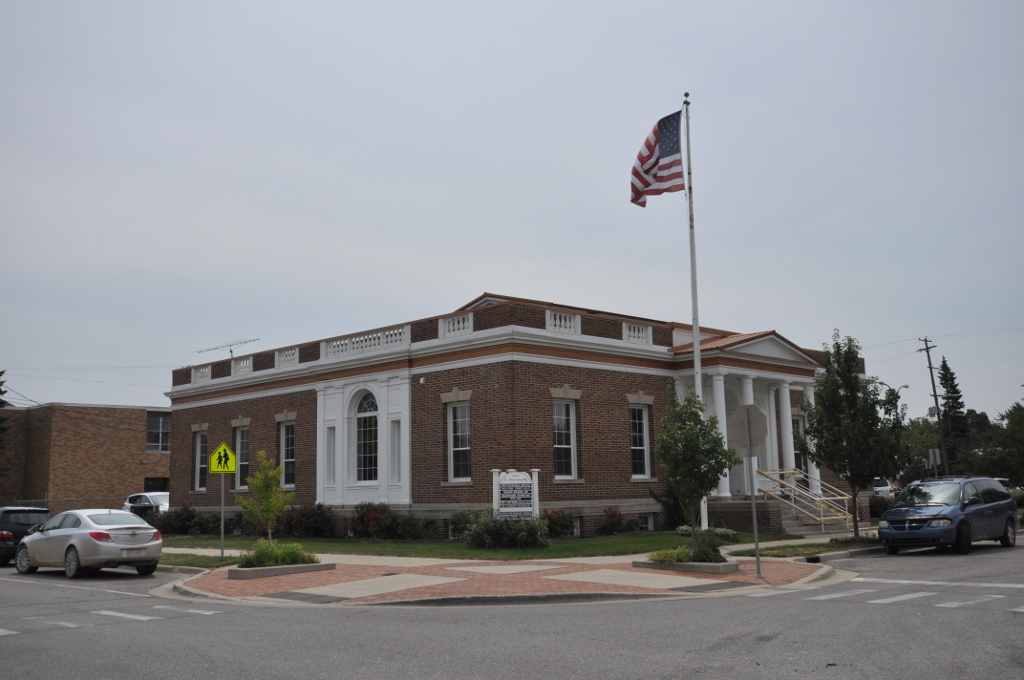
SE corner of Michigan and University, 2017
