= Michigan Condensed Milk Factory =

- U.S. National Register of Historic Places
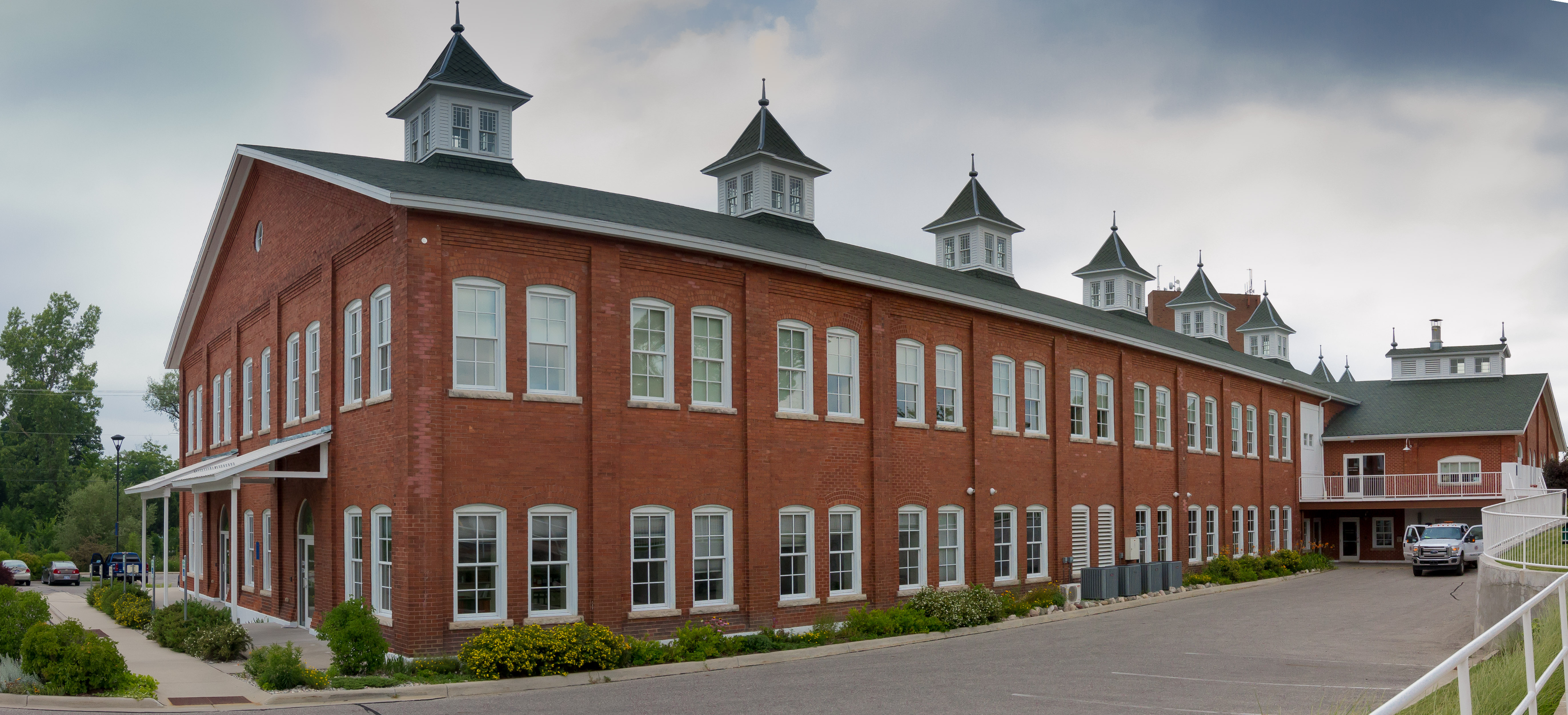
- Present Day Building-City of Mount Pleasant Offices

- Location within Michigan Location within the United States
- Interactive map
- Location: 320 W. Broadway St., Mount Pleasant, Michigan
- Coordinates: 43°36′17″N 84°46′54″W
- Area: 1 acre (0.40 ha)
- Built: 1907
- Built by: Henry Herring, D.C. Babcock
- Architect: William D. Kyser
- Architectural style: Italianate
- NRHP reference No.: 83000853
- Added to NRHP: April 7, 1983

The Michigan Condensed Milk Factory, also known as the Borden Creamery, is a factory building located at 320 West Broadway Street in Mount Pleasant, Michigan. It was listed on the National Register of Historic Places in 1983.

== History ==
Samuel Whaley Hopkins was born in 1845 in Exeter, Rhode Island, the youngest child of Samuel and Freelove Burlingame Hopkins. At age 11, his family moved to Connecticut, where Hopkins attended school. At age 16, he taught school, then moved to Charleston, South Carolina and then Cleveland, Ohio to attend school. He graduated from Union Business College in 1865, and spent the next few years teaching, working in retail, and studying law. In 1870, he entered the University of Michigan Law School, from which he graduated in 1872. After graduation, he took up law practice in Mount Pleasant, later serving as Isabella County prosecutor and representing the area in the state legislature.

In 1906, seeing a need for a milk factory in Mt. Pleasant, Hopkins negotiated with the Ann Arbor railway and the Michigan Condensed Milk Factory (owned by the Borden family) to locate a milk factory on a plot of land owned by the railroad. Hopkins successfully completed negotiations, and Borden constructed this creamery, designed by William D. Kyser, Superintendent of the Borden Creamery in Fairport, New York in Mount Pleasant. The building was completed in 1908 and operated as a creamery until 1960.

After the closure of the creamery, the building was sold to Burton Bader in 1965. Bader used it primarily for storage, and sold it in 1982. The building remained vacant, and went through a series of owners and proposed redevelopment attempts, until it was acquired by the city in 2002. In 2003, Central Michigan Developers, LLC purchased the building and began rehabilitation. The building was completed in 2009, and now houses the offices of the City of Mount Pleasant.

== Description ==
The Michigan Condensed Milk Factory is a rectangular red brick two-story Commercial Italianate structure with a low, gable roof sitting on a concrete block foundation pad. All four facades have paired, four-over-four double hung sash windows in each bay on each story, surrounded by brick piers. The windows are in bowed arches formed by triple rows of header brick, and corbeled rows of stretcher brick form a cornice line above. The long gable roof supports eight wood cupolas with "witches cap" roofs and knobbed spires. The interior of the creamery has two levels of open factory space.

== Gallery ==
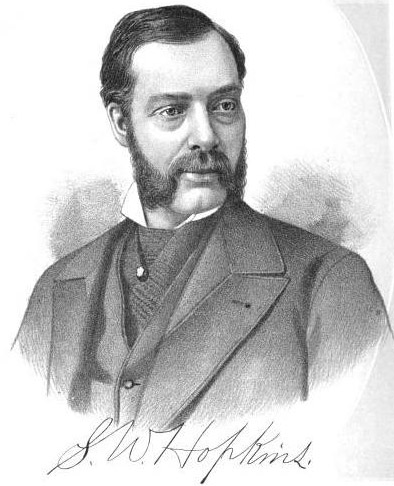
Samuel Whaley Hopkins

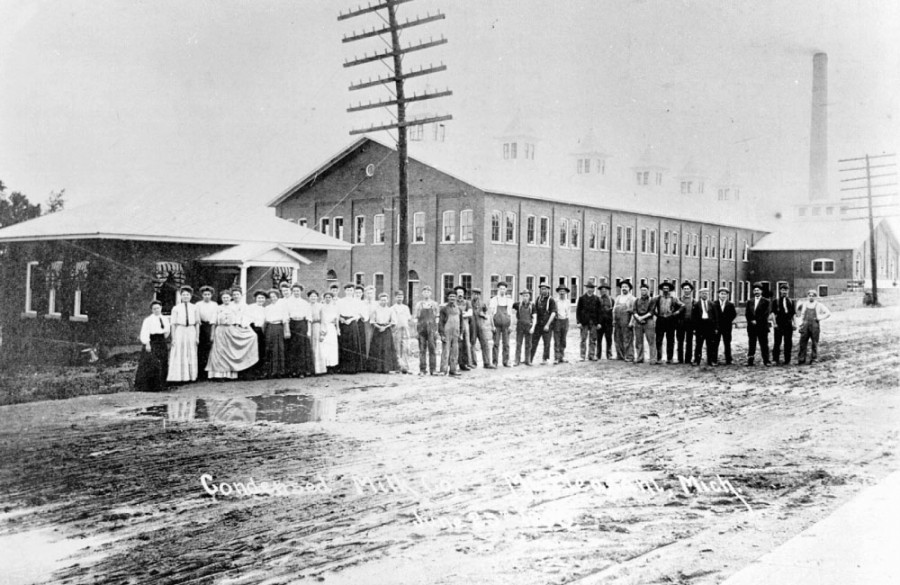
Condensed Milk Factory, c 1908

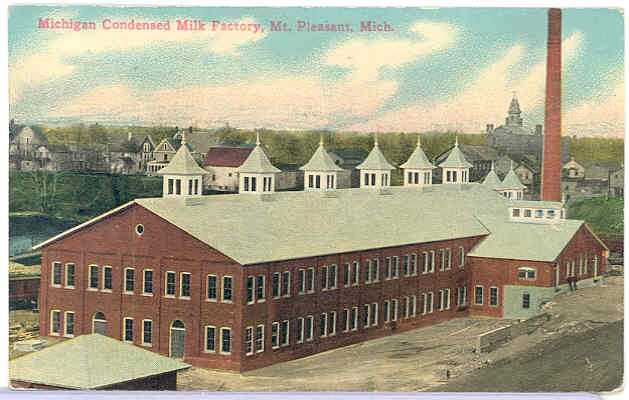
Condensed Milk Factory, c 1913
