= Henry McDaniel (artist) =

American painter (1906–2008)

- Born: Henry Edison McDaniel; October 2, 1906; Annapolis Royal, Nova Scotia, Canada
- Died: March 2, 2008 (aged 101); Quincy, Massachusetts, United States
- Resting place: Mount Wollaston Cemetery, Quincy, Massachusetts
- Education: Vesper George School of Art (1925–1927)
- Known for: Painter, printmaker
- Notable work: Fishing the Dry on the Upper Connecticut (1973); Morning on Taylor Shore (1976); Miramichi Morning (1989)
- Movement: Realism
- Spouse: Edith Louise Whiton (1909–2000)

Henry Edison McDaniel (October 2, 1906 − March 2, 2008) was a watercolor artist of landscapes, trout and salmon fishing scenes.

== Biography ==
McDaniel was born in Annapolis Royal, Nova Scotia (October 2, 1906) and died in Quincy, Massachusetts (March 2, 2008). He emigrated at age 19 from Bridgewater, Nova Scotia to Boston, Massachusetts, where he studied at the Vesper George School of Art (1925–1927) with Vesper George, Prescott Jones, William Hazelton and Frank Waldo Murray.

McDaniel earned his living in advertising. He was art director of four Boston agencies, Bennett and Northrup, Inc.; Norman-Buffet Display Industries, Inc.; Vose Swain Inc. and Bowne of Boston, Inc..

He developed his skills with watercolor in his leisure time beginning in the 1930s and painted en plein air for 20 years before he began his studio art in the 1950s. His first one-man exhibit (1940) consisted of Nova Scotian scenes at The Boston City Club Gallery. McDaniel stopped painting at age 100 after completing over 500 works, most of which are in private collections; some are in museums and corporate offices. His fine art work and articles by or about him have appeared in 27 publications from 1936 to 2010.

McDaniel's first print, "Fishing the Dry on the Upper Connecticut", was a limited edition made at Royal Smeets Offset Printers in Weert, Netherlands in 1973 for the members of The Anglers' Club of New York. His painting hangs at the club with the art of Winslow Homer and Ogden Pleissner. His print "Morning on Taylor Shore" was presented to Charles, Prince of Wales in 1978 at the International Atlantic Salmon Foundation Symposium, London, England. It was produced by the International Atlantic Salmon Foundation and the Crossroads of Sports, Inc. in 1976. A later print, "Miramichi Morning", was produced in 1989 by the Atlantic Salmon Federation for its members. For this painting, McDaniel was named artist of the year by the ASF.

Henry McDaniel's art and illustrations were used in two books: "The Art of the Atlantic Salmon Fly" by Joseph D Bates Jr. (1987), published by David R Godine, Boston, MA. and "The Compleat Lee Wulff" by Lee Wulff (1989), published by Truman Talley Books, E. P. Dutton, Ny, NY.

== Philosophy ==
Like artists of the Hudson River School, McDaniel painted streams, seascapes and landscapes as an outpouring of his passion for place and to promote conservation. Yet, McDaniel was determined not to stage or sentimentalize his art, often choosing unconventional subjects such as "Bush Island Castaways" and "Memories of Blue Rocks". He was influenced by Ogden Pleissner, Winslow Homer and Aiden Lassell Ripley. His paintings are representational and notable for realistic water and light effects. As he was a skilled and avid fisherman, he painted trout and salmon scenes with authentic detail. Most of his fishing scenes are set in New England and Maritime Canada.

== Memberships ==
- 1951 – Boston Watercolor Society
- 1953 – The Guild of Boston Artists
- 1988 – The Hudson Valley Art Association

== Museums ==
- The Holyoke Museum of Art, Holyoke, Massachusetts
- American Museum of Fly Fishing, Manchester, Vermont
- Miramichi Salmon Museum, Doaktown, New Brunswick, Canada

== Awards and honors ==
- 1950s – Several awards for Excellence at the Boston Guild of Watercolor Society Painters exhibits, Boston Museum of Fine Arts, Boston, Massachusetts.
- 1958 – B.L. Makepeace award for "Approaching Shower" at the Boston Society of Watercolor Painters exhibit, Boston Museum of Fine Arts.
- 1960 – Richard Mitton medal for " Waitsfield, Vermont" most popular in Class D.
- 1964 – Richard Mitton medal for "Road to the Sea" most popular in Class D.
- 1966 – Richard Mitton medal for "Down East Memories" most popular in Class D.

The Richard Mitton medals were given at the Annual Exhibit of Paintings by Contemporary Artists of New England at the Jordan Marsh galleries in Boston, Massachusetts.

- 1973 – The Angler's Club of New York selected "Fishing the Dry on the Upper Connecticut" for their gallery and to be used for prints for their members.
- 1988 – First Place at the State of Maine Wildlife Art Show.
- 1989 – Third Place at the State of Maine Wildlife Art Show.
- 1989 – Artist of the Year, The Atlantic Salmon Federation, Montreal, Canada, for his "MIramichi Morning" made into a print for ASF members.
- 1991 – New England Watercolor Society prize, annual Grumbacher Show, Guild of Boston Artists.
- 1993 – Hall of Fame Inductee Miramichi Salmon Museum, Doaktown, New Brunswick, Canada.

== Exhibits ==
- 1940 – Boston City Club Gallery, a one-man show of Nova Scotian scenes.
- 1949, 1955, 1957 – National Academy Galleries, 5th Ave. N.Y. American Watercolor Society.
- 1958,1972 Scituate Arts Festival, Scituate, Massachusetts.
- 1963 – 7th Annual Eastern States Art Exhibit, Springfield, Massachusetts.
- 1955–1959 – An Exhibition of Paintings from the Ford Times Collection of American Art, "Artists and Fishermen", Ford Motor Company and New England Journeys Exhibits toured New England museums, art galleries and libraries.
- 1940–1973 – Contemporary New England Artists exhibits at Jordan Marsh Company Gallery, Boston, Massachusetts, 22 shows.
- 1940–1975 – Boston Society of Watercolor Painters exhibits: Vose Galleries in 1950, Boston Museum of Fine Arts 1951–1973, Boston Center for the Arts 1974 and 1975, 23 shows.
- 1955 – Guild of Boston Artists, Boston, South Braintree and Lexington, Massachusetts.
- 1979 – Thomas Crane Public Library, Quincy, Massachusetts, a one-man show; also 1976.
- 1973 – The Angler's Club of New York, New York City.
- 1975 – Arlington Art Association, Arlington, Massachusetts.
- 1979 – Soaring Wings Gallery, Eugene, Oregon.
- 1985–86 – Atlantic Salmon Federation Conclaves, Corner Brook, Newfoundland, Canada.
- 1987–1989 – Atlantic Salmon Federation Dinners, Montreal, Quebec, Canada.
- 1990 – Hudson Valley Art Show, Westchester County Center, White Plains, New York.
- 1990 – The Miramichi Salmon Museum Art Festival, Doaktown, New Brunswick, Canada.
- 1993 – Atlantic Salmon Federation show at L.L. Bean, Freeport, Maine.
- 2010 – Petite Riviere, Nova Scotia, Canada, a one-man retrospective exhibit of his paintings of Lunenburg County, Nova Scotia accompanied by a lecture on the paintings by Brian Oickle, Toronto MFA.

== Publications ==
- 1936 – National Sportsman May vol. LXXV, no. 5, cover painting.
- 1937 – National Sportsman April vol. LXXVII, no. 4, cover painting.
- 1954 – Lincoln-Mercury Times March–April published by the Ford Motor Company, Dearborn, Michigan "Song of the Margaree" story and paintings by Henry McDaniel pgs. 1–4.
- 1955 – Ford Times May published by Ford Motor Company "Big Trout in Vermont Streams" story and paintings by Henry McDaniel pgs. 2–5.
- 1957 – Ford Times March published by Ford Motor Company "Nova Scotia's Little Rivers" story and paintings by Henry McDaniel pgs. 2–7.
- 1957 – Ford Times July published by Ford Motor Company "Quebec's Roadside River for Salmon" by Peter Barrett, paintings by Henry McDaniel pgs. 28–33.
- 1959 – Ford Times June published by Ford Motor Company "St. Mary's River for Salmon" story and paintings by Henry McDaniel pgs. 2–5.
- 1960 – Ford Times June published by Ford Motor Company "Connecticut River Trout Pools" by Corey Ford, paintings by Henry McDaniel pgs. 2–7.
- 1961 – Ford Times September published by Ford Motor Company " River of Distinction" by Jeff Rawlings, paintings by Henry McDaniel pgs. 31–33.
- 1962 – Ford Times published by Ford Motor Company "The Water is Always Bluer" by Robert G. Deindorfer, paintings by Henry McDaniel pgs. 61–63.
- 1974 – Sports Afield magazine February painting by Henry McDaniel pg. 36.
- 1976 – Gray's Sporting Journal Spring vol. 1, no. 2 cover painting by Henry McDaniel.
- 1984 – Gray's Sporting Journal Summer vol. 9, issue 2 inside cover painting by Henry McDaniel.
- 1985 – Atlantic Salmon Journal Summer vol. XXXIV, no. 2 "A Brush With Adventure: the sporting art of Henry McDaniel" by Spence Conley pgs. 36–39, 41.
- 1986 – Spawner Sport Fishing Annual cover painting by Henry McDaniel.
- 1987 – Landmarks, Ontario's Natural Resources Magazine painting by Henry McDaniel pg. 9.
- 1987 – The Fishers Forum December "The FlyFisher's Artist – Henry McDaniel" by Tom McMillan pgs. 1, 12, 13.
- 1987 – Book "The Art of the Atlantic Salmon Fly" by Joseph D. Bates Jr. published by David R. Godine, Boston, Massachusetts "The Return" and line drawings by Henry McDaniel.
- 1989 – Atlantic Salmon Journal Autumn vol. XXXVIII, no. 3 painting by Henry McDaniel pg. 16.
- 1989 – Book "The Compleat Lee Wulff" by Lee Wulff published by Truman Talley Books, E.P.Dutton, N.Y., N.Y. cover painting and illustrations by Henry McDaniel.
- 1990 – Fishing Collectibles Magazine Fall vol. 2, no. 2 cover painting by Henry McDaniel.
- 1992 – Fly Rod and Reel April "Profile: Henry McDaniel" by Spence Conley pgs. 29–30, 84–86.
- 2003 – Art of Angling Journal vol. 2 issue 2 "A Brush With Immortality in the Art of Henry McDaniel" by Douglas Marchant cover and pgs. 4, 26–64.
- 2004 – The Magazine Antiques July "Fishing in the Rapids" a painting by Henry McDaniel attributed falsely to John Whorf by Avery Galleries. Haverford, Pennsylvania.
- 2005 – Atlantic Salmon Journal Spring vol. 54, no. 1 cover "Unnamed Pool" painting by Henry McDaniel attributed falsely to John Whorf.
- 2005 – Atlantic Salmon Journal Summer vol.54, no. 2 "Stealing Henry's Name" pgs. 60–65 and "The Henry McDaniel Affair" pg. 4 both by Martin Silverstone, editor.
- 2005 – International Foundation for Art Research (IFAR) Journal vol. 8, no. 1 "The Painting is Real, The Name is Not" by Sharon Flescher painting by Henry McDaniel pgs. 4–5.
- 2008 – Atlantic Salmon Journal vol. 57, no. 2 "Perfect Water" by Martin Silverstone, "The Return" painting by Henry McDaniel (1906–2008).
- 2009 – Photographic book, "A Celebration of Henry McDaniel", 208 paintings reproduced, privately published by Joseph W McDaniel.

== See also ==
- Ford Times
- Ogden Pleissner
- Winslow Homer
- Lee Wulff
- Hudson River School
- The Guild of Boston Artists
