= Mount Pleasant, Michigan =

- City
- City of Mount Pleasant
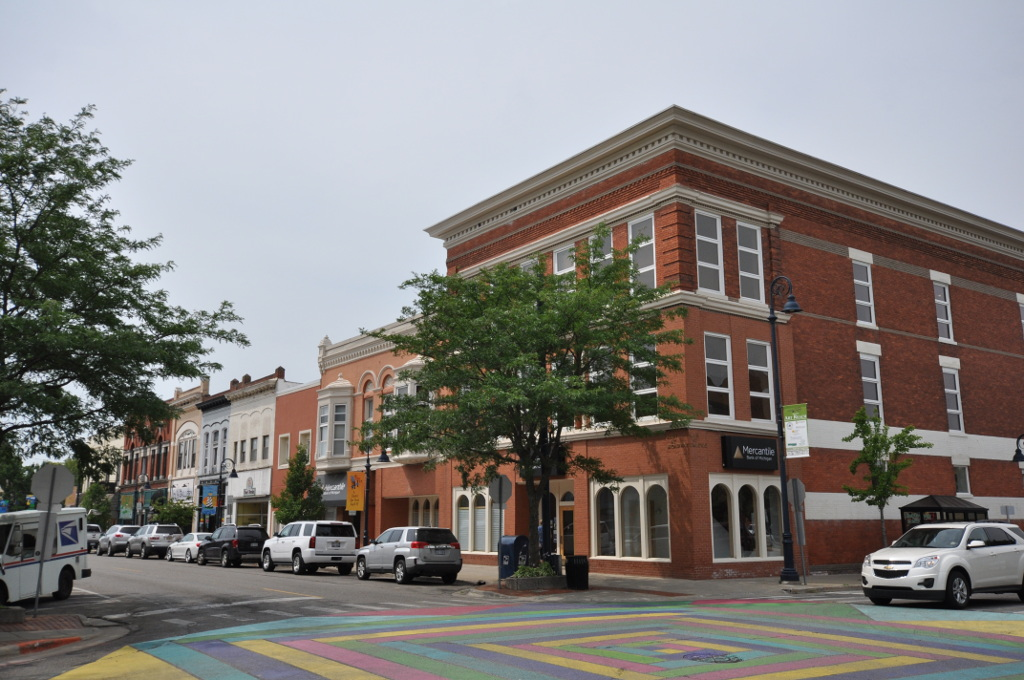
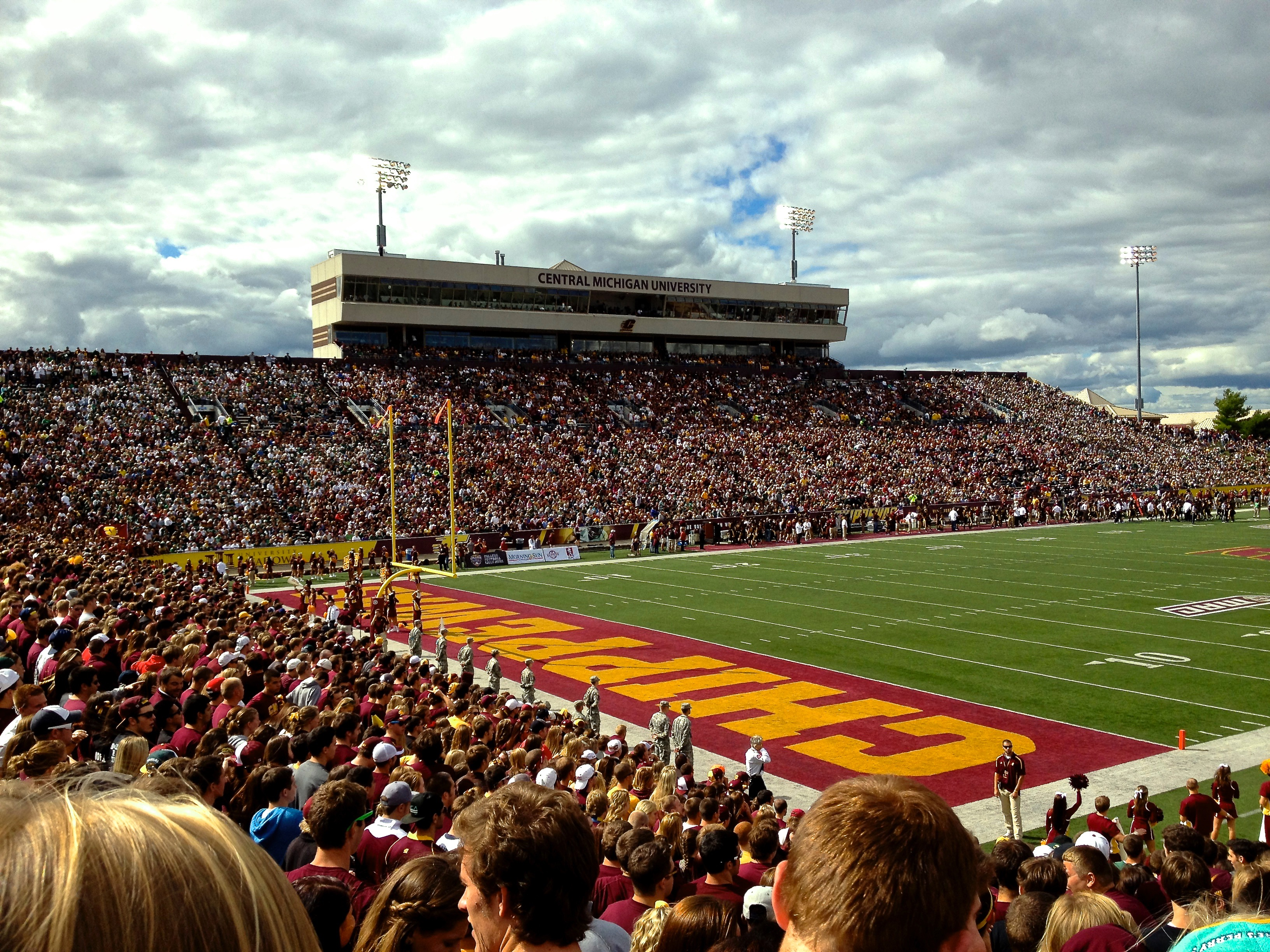
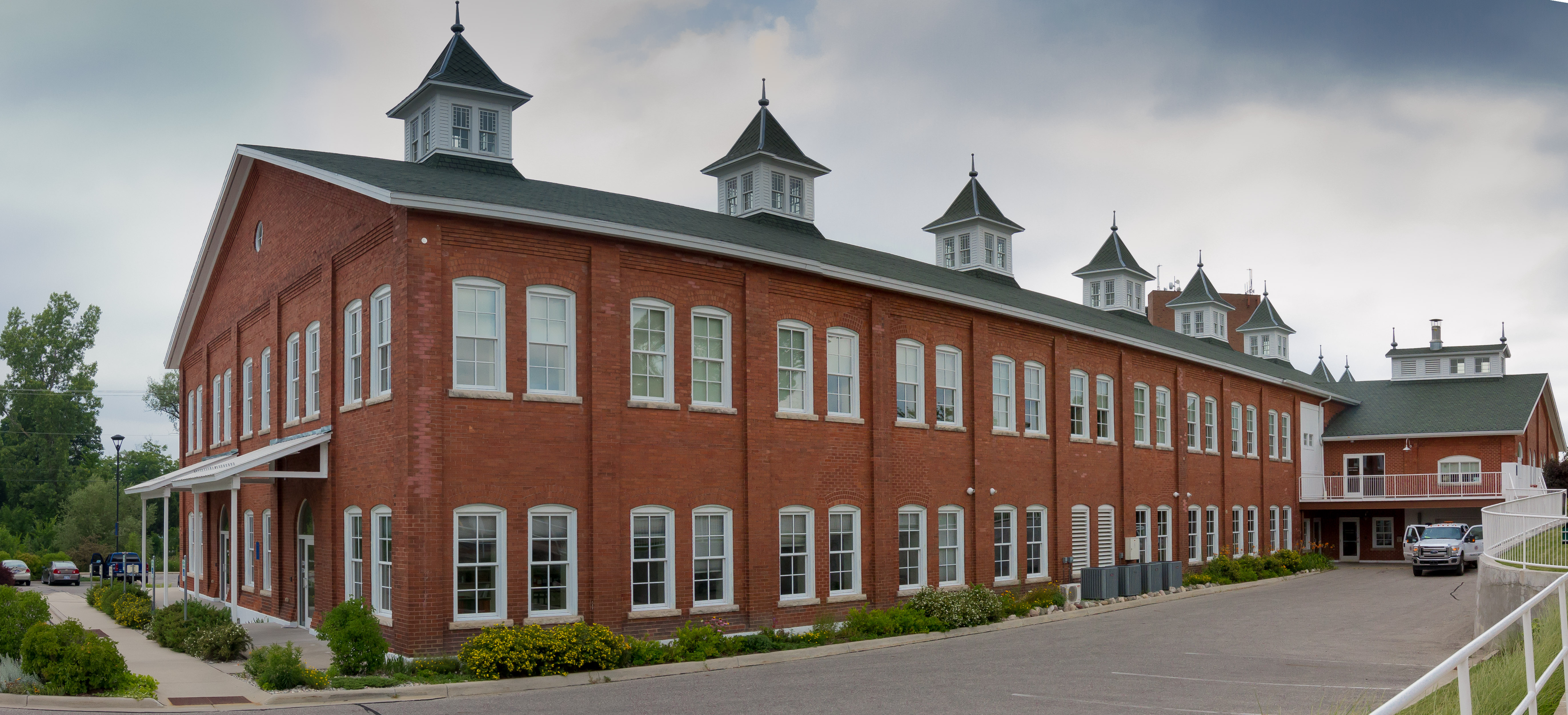
- Mount Pleasant Downtown Historic District Kelly/Shorts Stadium Mount Pleasant City Hall

- Seal
- Nickname: "Oil Capital of Michigan"
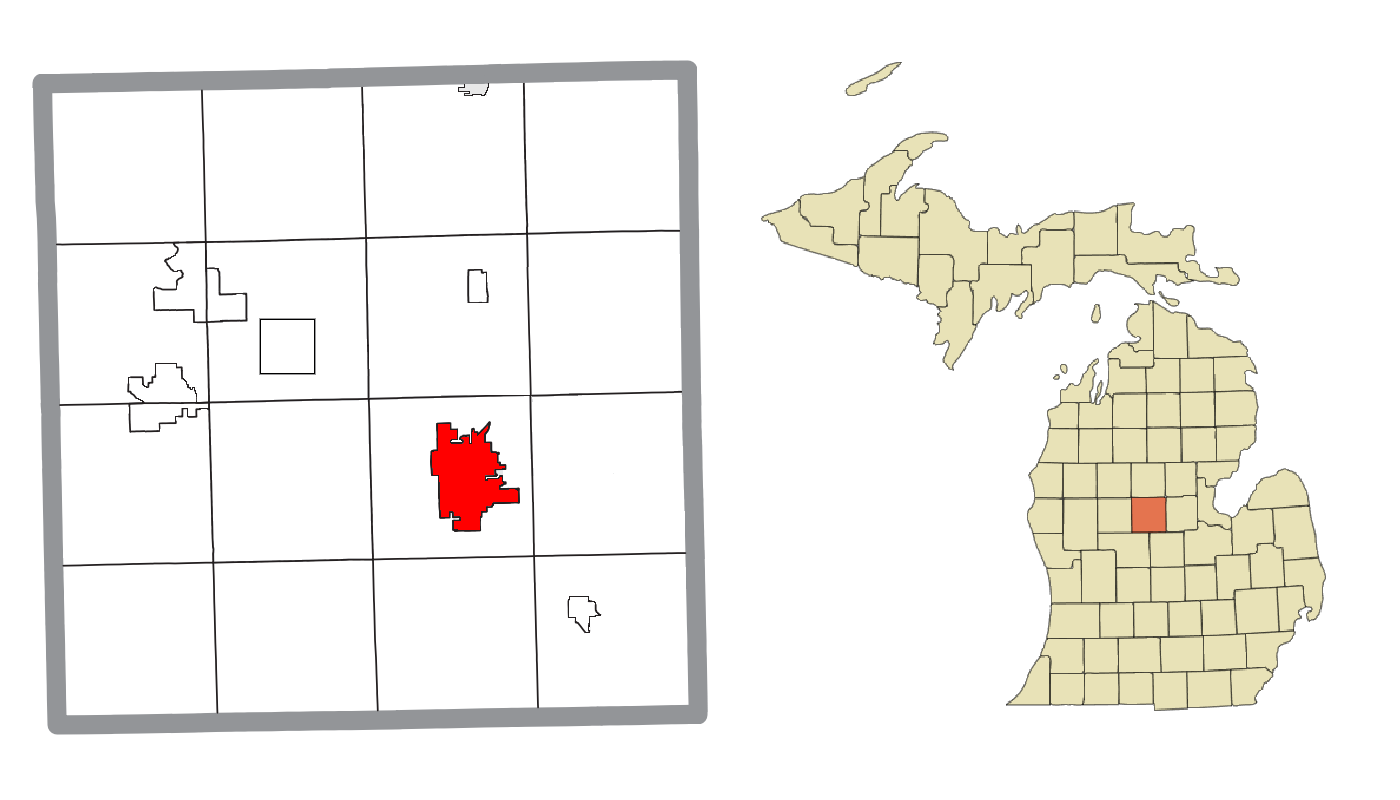
- Location within Isabella County

- Location within the state of Michigan
- Coordinates: 43°35′52″N 84°46′03″W
- Country: United States
- State: Michigan
- County: Isabella
- Incorporated: 1889

Government
  - Type: Council–manager
  - Mayor: Boomer Wingard
  - City manager: Aaron Desentz

Area
  - Total: 7.81 sq mi (20.23 km^{2})
  - Land: 7.72 sq mi (20.00 km^{2})
  - Water: 0.089 sq mi (0.23 km^{2}) 1.15%
- Elevation: 771 ft (235 m)

Population (2020)
  - Total: 21,688
  - Density: 2,808.6/sq mi (1,084.39/km^{2})
- Time zone: UTC-5 (EST)
  - Summer (DST): UTC-4 (EDT)
- ZIP Code(s): 48804 (P.O. Box); 48858 (general); 48859 (CMU)
- Area code: 989
- FIPS code: 26-56020
- GNIS feature ID: 0632832
- Website: mt-pleasant.org

Mount Pleasant is a city in the U.S. state of Michigan. The city is the county seat of Isabella County, which is part of Central Michigan. The population of Mount Pleasant was 21,688 as of the 2020 census. The city is surrounded by Union Charter Township, but is politically independent.

Part of the city (with a population of 8,741) is located within the Isabella Indian Reservation, the base of the federally recognized Saginaw Chippewa Tribal Nation. The tribe's Soaring Eagle Casino & Resort in nearby Chippewa Township is also within the reservation boundaries.

Mount Pleasant is home to the main campuses of Central Michigan University, one of the largest universities in the state with 20,000 students at Mount Pleasant, and Mid Michigan Community College. The student population nearly doubles the population of the city during the academic year, making it a college town. Despite its name, the surrounding area is mostly flat and does not feature any mountains or hills.

== History ==
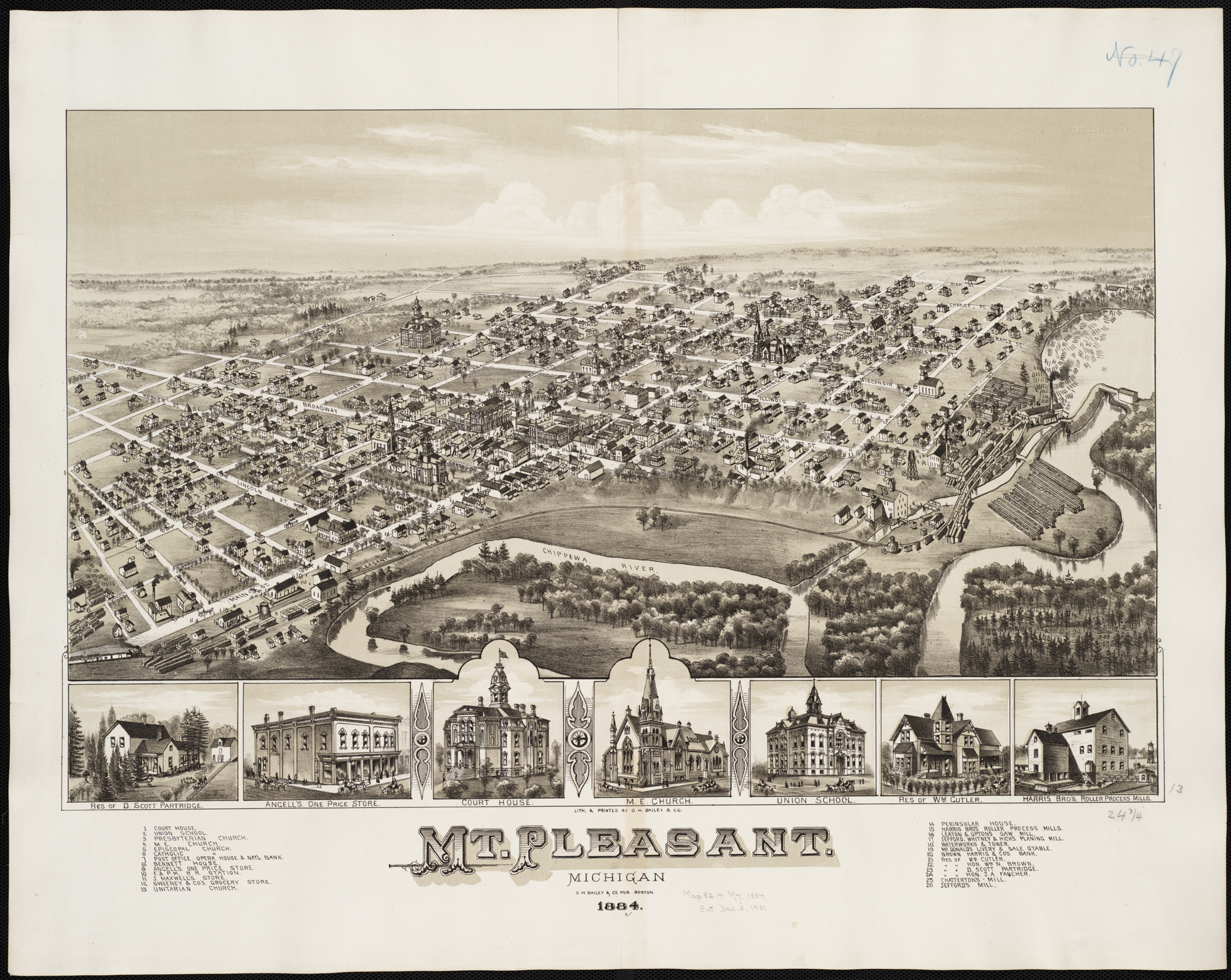
1884 map of Mt. Pleasant.

Until the mid-19th century, this area was occupied by historical bands of the Ojibwa people, known by English speakers as the Chippewa. In the early decades of the century, they ceded vast amounts of land to the United States government, which wanted to enable settlement by European Americans.

The federal Graduation Act of 1854 allowed settlers to purchase land from the government at discount rates, and the first white settlers began to arrive in what became Mount Pleasant. Under the Treaty of 1855, the Ojibwa bands (Saginaw Chippewa Tribal Nation) from the Saginaw, Swan Creek, and Black rivers were relocated to land in Isabella County (Isabella Indian Reservation).

Many non-natives soon moved to Mount Pleasant, predicting prosperous relations with the natives. The Homestead Act of 1862 also attracted many new settlers to Mount Pleasant, including new European immigrants, They worked to develop their stake on free lands offered by the US government in exchange for their labor in developing it for residence and agriculture.

The village and future city developed. In 1875, a devastating fire started at the Fancher Building on the north corner of Broadway and Main streets. It moved east down Broadway, destroying several buildings. Seven years later another fire would damage buildings on the south side of Broadway.

In 1879 the first library was established in Mt. Pleasant. Known as "The Library, Literary, and Musical Association of Mount Pleasant," its first books were made up of the personal book collections of the board members.

In 1890, W.A. Jordan started Mount Pleasant Business College. Expanding in 1892, the school changed its name to Central Michigan Normal School and Business Institute, as it incorporated a curriculum of teacher training. It was the origin of what is now Central Michigan University. The Mt. Pleasant main campus is the largest of 8 CMU locations in the state, with just over 10,000 undergrad students living on campus or campus affiliated housing in the fall of 2022.

On January 3, 1893, the U.S. government opened an Indian boarding school called the Mount Pleasant Indian Industrial Boarding School. Indian children were forced to give up their cultural ways and assimilate to using the English language and adopting European-American culture. The school operated for 40 years, closing in 1933.

Since the late 20th and early 21st centuries, the role of such schools has been re-evaluated and the damage done to children by such efforts has been acknowledged. Various Native American groups have taken action to help people reconcile their experiences. On July 17, 2009, the White Bison Wellbriety Journey for Forgiveness made a stop in the Mount Pleasant community to recognize this part of the city's history. The boarding school building was abandoned, but the Saginaw Chippewa Tribal Nation purchased it from the state of Michigan.

In 1928, large quantities of oil were discovered in the Mt. Pleasant area. A farm owned by the Lilly family was the first to strike, producing hundreds of barrels a day. Although oil resources eventually diminished, this legacy is represented in the Mt. Pleasant city seal, which includes an image of an oil drill. Mt. Pleasant High School's mascot, the Oiler, also refers to the city's history of oil production. The city eventually became known as the "Oil Capital of Michigan".

== Geography ==
According to the United States Census Bureau, the city has a total area of 7.83 square miles (20.28 km^{2}), of which 7.74 square miles (20.05 km^{2}) is land and 0.09 square miles (0.23 km^{2}) is water. The Chippewa River runs through the city. Mount Pleasant is located approximately 61 miles (98 km) north of Lansing, Michigan's state capital, along US 127.

=== Climate ===
Climate data for Mount Pleasant, Michigan (Central Michigan University) 1991–2020 normals, extremes 1895–present
Month	Jan	Feb	Mar	Apr	May	Jun	Jul	Aug	Sep	Oct	Nov	Dec	Year
Record high °F (°C)	60 (16)	67 (19)	87 (31)	91 (33)	97 (36)	103 (39)	106 (41)	108 (42)	99 (37)	88 (31)	77 (25)	69 (21)	108 (42)
Mean daily maximum °F (°C)	29.5 (−1.4)	32.3 (0.2)	42.7 (5.9)	56.2 (13.4)	69.4 (20.8)	79.5 (26.4)	83.7 (28.7)	81.5 (27.5)	74.0 (23.3)	60.2 (15.7)	45.8 (7.7)	34.8 (1.6)	57.5 (14.2)
Daily mean °F (°C)	22.7 (−5.2)	24.4 (−4.2)	33.1 (0.6)	45.1 (7.3)	57.6 (14.2)	68.0 (20.0)	72.2 (22.3)	70.2 (21.2)	62.6 (17.0)	50.3 (10.2)	38.3 (3.5)	28.6 (−1.9)	47.8 (8.8)
Mean daily minimum °F (°C)	15.9 (−8.9)	16.5 (−8.6)	23.6 (−4.7)	34.0 (1.1)	45.8 (7.7)	56.5 (13.6)	60.7 (15.9)	59.0 (15.0)	51.3 (10.7)	40.5 (4.7)	30.9 (−0.6)	22.4 (−5.3)	38.1 (3.4)
Record low °F (°C)	−25 (−32)	−30 (−34)	−18 (−28)	−3 (−19)	20 (−7)	25 (−4)	31 (−1)	36 (2)	27 (−3)	13 (−11)	−6 (−21)	−14 (−26)	−30 (−34)
Average precipitation inches (mm)	2.11 (54)	1.72 (44)	1.95 (50)	3.57 (91)	3.71 (94)	3.87 (98)	3.22 (82)	3.84 (98)	2.82 (72)	3.52 (89)	2.79 (71)	2.35 (60)	35.47 (901)
Source: NOAA

== Demographics ==
Historical population
Census	Pop.	Note	%±
1880	1,115		—
1890	2,701		142.2%
1900	3,662		35.6%
1910	3,972		8.5%
1920	4,819		21.3%
1930	5,211		8.1%
1940	8,413		61.4%
1950	11,393		35.4%
1960	14,875		30.6%
1970	20,524		38.0%
1980	23,746		15.7%
1990	23,285		−1.9%
2000	25,946		11.4%
2010	26,016		0.3%
2020	21,688		−16.6%
U.S. Decennial Census

=== 2020 census ===
As of the 2020 census, Mount Pleasant had a population of 21,688. The median age was 24.1 years. 14.0% of residents were under the age of 18 and 10.7% of residents were 65 years of age or older. For every 100 females there were 88.8 males, and for every 100 females age 18 and over there were 86.8 males age 18 and over.

100.0% of residents lived in urban areas, while 0.0% lived in rural areas.

There were 7,986 households in Mount Pleasant, of which 21.5% had children under the age of 18 living in them. Of all households, 25.7% were married-couple households, 28.2% were households with a male householder and no spouse or partner present, and 36.4% were households with a female householder and no spouse or partner present. About 39.3% of all households were made up of individuals and 10.6% had someone living alone who was 65 years of age or older.

There were 8,956 housing units, of which 10.8% were vacant. The homeowner vacancy rate was 1.5% and the rental vacancy rate was 9.7%.

Racial composition as of the 2020 census
Race	Number	Percent
White	17,135	79.0%
Black or African American	1,370	6.3%
American Indian and Alaska Native	602	2.8%
Asian	745	3.4%
Native Hawaiian and Other Pacific Islander	9	0.0%
Some other race	294	1.4%
Two or more races	1,533	7.1%
Hispanic or Latino (of any race)	1,250	5.8%

=== 2010 census ===
As of the census of 2010, there were 26,016 people, 8,376 households, and 3,100 families living in the city. The population density was 3,361.2 inhabitants per square mile (1,297.8/km^{2}). There were 8,981 housing units at an average density of 1,160.3 per square mile (448.0/km^{2}). The racial makeup of the city was 87.6% White, 3.9% African American, 2.0% Native American, 3.0% Asian, 0.6% from other races, and 2.8% from two or more races. Hispanic or Latino of any race were 3.3% of the population.

There were 8,376 households, of which 18.7% had children under the age of 18 living with them, 24.3% were married couples living together, 9.3% had a female householder with no husband present, 3.4% had a male householder with no wife present, and 63.0% were non-families. 31.6% of all households were made up of individuals, and 8.6% had someone living alone who was 65 years of age or older. The average household size was 2.35 and the average family size was 2.86.

The median age in the city was 22 years. 11% of residents were under the age of 18; 53.1% were between the ages of 18 and 24; 16.8% were from 25 to 44; 11.9% were from 45 to 64; and 7.2% were 65 years of age or older. The gender makeup of the city was 47.4% male and 52.6% female.

=== 2000 census ===
As of the census of 2000, there were 25,946 people, 8,449 households, and 3,126 families living in the city. The population density was 3,327.2 inhabitants per square mile (1,284.6/km^{2}). There were 8,878 housing units at an average density of 1,138.5 per square mile (439.6/km^{2}). The racial makeup of the city was 89.12% White, 3.67% African American, 1.54% Native American, 2.85% Asian, 0.07% Pacific Islander, 0.93% from other races, and 1.83% from two or more races. Hispanic or Latino of any race were 2.49% of the population.

There were 8,449 households, out of which 18.8% had children under the age of 18 living with them, 25.9% were married couples living together, 8.5% had a female householder with no husband present, and 63.0% were non-families. 29.6% of all households were made up of individuals, and 8.8% had someone living alone who was 65 years of age or older. The average household size was 2.38 and the average family size was 2.88.

In the city, the population was spread out, with 11.5% under the age of 18, 54.1% from 18 to 24, 16.9% from 25 to 44, 10.2% from 45 to 64, and 7.3% who were 65 years of age or older. The median age was 22 years. For every 100 females, there were 82.4 males. For every 100 females age 18 and over, there were 80.2 males.

The median income for a household in the city was $24,572, and the median income for a family was $43,927. Males had a median income of $32,004 versus $23,869 for females. The per capita income for the city was $13,177. About 11.4% of families and 37.2% of the population (student population skews this statistic) were below the poverty line, including 14.8% of those under age 18 and 7.6% of those age 65 or over.

== Transportation ==
- US 127 is a major north–south route connecting with Lansing and Jackson to the south and with Clare and Grayling to the north.
- Bus. US 127 (Mission Street) is a loop route traveling through the heart of the city, connecting with US 127 at each end.
- M-20 continues east to Midland and Bay City and west toward Big Rapids.
- Mount Pleasant Municipal Airport is located 2 mi (3.2 km) northeast of the central business district.

== Education ==
- Central Michigan University
- Mid Michigan Community College-Mount Pleasant Campus
- Saginaw Chippewa Tribal College
- Mount Pleasant Public Schools including Mount Pleasant High School
- Sacred Heart Academy, private Catholic school

== Local media ==
Newspapers

- The Morning Sun (Daily)
- Central Michigan Life (Published Monday and Thursday during the academic year)
- The Pulse - aka Central Michigan Pulse (Weekly - Published on Thursdays)

Radio stations

- WMMI (830 AM) - Country music (licensed to Shepherd)
- WCMU (89.5 FM) - CMU Public Radio
- WMHW-FM (91.5 FM) - CMU College Student Radio/The Mountain (Adult Album Alternative)
- WCEN-FM (94.5 FM) - The Moose - Country music (licensed to Hemlock; formerly located in Mount Pleasant)
- WCFX (95.3 FM) - 95-3 CFX "Todays Hits' - Top 40 (licensed to Clare)
- W266BU (101.1 FM) - CMU College Student Radio/The Beat (Rhythmic Contemporary) (repeats WMHW-FM's HD2 signal)
- WCZY-FM (104.3 FM) - My 104-3 'Central Michigan's Best Variety') -Adult Hits
- NOAA Weather Radio KZZ33)

162.525 MHz) serves Clare Gratiot Isabella Mecosta Midland Montcalm And Osceola Counties

TV stations

- WCMU (Channel 14) - PBS

== Notable people ==
- James "Gerbs" Bauer, astronomer
- Mark Beard, racing driver
- Ryan Brehm, 3-time NCAA champion golfer
- Paul Carey, baseball broadcaster, Detroit Tigers
- Tom Crean, college basketball coach
- Dick Enberg, sports broadcaster
- John Engler, former Governor of Michigan
- Isaac A. Fancher, mayor of Mount Pleasant and state politician
- Cindy Figg-Currier, pro golfer
- William S. Hammack. engineering, YouTube personality engineerguy
- Len Kasper, baseball broadcaster, Chicago Cubs
- Matt LaFleur, head coach, Green Bay Packers
- Mike LaFleur, head coach, Arizona Cardinals
- Grace McArthur, folk artist
- James E. McBryde, Michigan state legislator and salesman
- Sara Murray, CNN political correspondent
- Dan Pohl, pro golfer
- Kelly Robbins, pro golfer
- Dan Schafer, musician and songwriter
- John William Tebbel, journalist, editor, writer, teacher, and media historian.

== Sister cities ==
- Okaya, Japan
- Valdivia, Chile
