= List of municipalities in Michigan =

Michigan municipalities
- Map of the 1,774 municipalities in Michigan
- Category: Second-level administrative division
- Location: Michigan
- Created by: Northwest Ordinance
- Created: July 13, 1787
- Number: 1,774 (Note: There are 1,240 townships, 276 cities, and 258 villages in the state.)
- Populations: 15 (Pointe Aux Barques Township) – 639,111 (Detroit)
- Areas: 0.07 square miles (0.18 km^{2}) (Ahmeek) – 588.8 square miles (1,525 km^{2}) (McMillan Township)
- Government: Municipal government

Map of the United States with Michigan highlighted

Michigan is a state in the Midwest region of the United States. According to the 2020 United States Census, Michigan is the 10th most populous state with 10,077,331 inhabitants and the 22nd largest by land area spanning 56,538.90 square miles (146,435.1 km^{2}) of land. Michigan is divided into 83 counties and contains 1,774 municipalities consisting of 276 cities, 258 villages, and 1,240 townships. The largest municipality by population in Michigan is Detroit with 639,111 residents; the smallest municipality by population is Pointe Aux Barques Township with 15 residents. The largest municipality by land area is McMillan Township which spans 588.78 mi^{2} (1,524.9 km^{2}), while Ahmeek is the smallest at 0.07 mi^{2} (0.18 km^{2}).

Municipalities include incorporated cities and villages, and townships (often referred to collectively as "CVTs"), which may either be general law or chartered. Charter townships are unique to Michigan among U.S. states. Unlike general law townships, they are incorporated, and they are delegated more power over local taxation and protection against annexation, but have more municipal responsibilities and obligations. Cities are not subject to a township's jurisdiction, but villages remain part of the township in which they are located; village residents pay both township and village taxes, and share services with the township. Since all Michigan residents who do not live in a city live in a township, a village's population is counted in the population of the township in which it is located.

== List of municipalities ==
State capital‡

County seat†

Name	Type	County	Population (2020)	Population (2010)	Change	Population (2000)	Land area (2010)	Density (2010)
Acme	Township	Grand Traverse	4,456	4,375	+1.9%	4,332	25.01 sq mi (64.8 km^{2})	174.9/sq mi (67.5/km^{2})
Ada	Township	Kent	14,388	13,142	+9.5%	9,882	36.04 sq mi (93.3 km^{2})	364.7/sq mi (140.8/km^{2})
Adams	Township	Arenac	554	563	−1.6%	550	35.64 sq mi (92.3 km^{2})	15.8/sq mi (6.1/km^{2})
Adams	Township	Hillsdale	2,327	2,493	−6.7%	2,498	35.64 sq mi (92.3 km^{2})	69.9/sq mi (27.0/km^{2})
Adams	Township	Houghton	2,540	2,573	−1.3%	2,747	47.05 sq mi (121.9 km^{2})	54.7/sq mi (21.1/km^{2})
Addison	Village	Lenawee	573	605	−5.3%	627	0.96 sq mi (2.5 km^{2})	630.2/sq mi (243.3/km^{2})
Addison	Township	Oakland	6,256	6,351	−1.5%	6,439	35.52 sq mi (92.0 km^{2})	178.8/sq mi (69.0/km^{2})
Adrian†	City	Lenawee	20,645	21,133	−2.3%	21,574	7.95 sq mi (20.6 km^{2})	2,658.2/sq mi (1,026.4/km^{2})
Adrian	Charter township	Lenawee	6,401	6,035	+6.1%	5,749	33.99 sq mi (88.0 km^{2})	177.6/sq mi (68.6/km^{2})
Aetna	Township	Mecosta	2,241	2,299	−2.5%	2,044	35.52 sq mi (92.0 km^{2})	64.7/sq mi (25.0/km^{2})
Aetna	Township	Missaukee	429	413	+3.9%	491	35.88 sq mi (92.9 km^{2})	11.5/sq mi (4.4/km^{2})
Ahmeek	Village	Keweenaw	127	146	−13.0%	157	0.07 sq mi (0.18 km^{2})	2,085.7/sq mi (805.3/km^{2})
Akron	Village	Tuscola	349	402	−13.2%	461	0.94 sq mi (2.4 km^{2})	427.7/sq mi (165.1/km^{2})
Akron	Township	Tuscola	1,379	1,503	−8.3%	1,589	52.75 sq mi (136.6 km^{2})	28.5/sq mi (11.0/km^{2})
Alabaster	Township	Iosco	424	487	−12.9%	503	22.22 sq mi (57.5 km^{2})	21.9/sq mi (8.5/km^{2})
Alaiedon	Township	Ingham	2,910	2,894	+0.6%	3,498	35.60 sq mi (92.2 km^{2})	81.3/sq mi (31.4/km^{2})
Alamo	Township	Kalamazoo	3,805	3,762	+1.1%	3,820	36.20 sq mi (93.8 km^{2})	103.9/sq mi (40.1/km^{2})
Alanson	Village	Emmet	778	738	+5.4%	785	0.99 sq mi (2.6 km^{2})	745.5/sq mi (287.8/km^{2})
Albee	Township	Saginaw	2,046	2,160	−5.3%	2,338	36.04 sq mi (93.3 km^{2})	59.9/sq mi (23.1/km^{2})
Albert	Township	Montmorency	2,453	2,526	−2.9%	2,695	65.66 sq mi (170.1 km^{2})	38.5/sq mi (14.9/km^{2})
Albion	City	Calhoun	7,700	8,616	−10.6%	9,144	4.41 sq mi (11.4 km^{2})	1,953.7/sq mi (754.3/km^{2})
Albion	Township	Calhoun	1,094	1,123	−2.6%	1,200	32.63 sq mi (84.5 km^{2})	34.4/sq mi (13.3/km^{2})
Alcona	Township	Alcona	966	968	−0.2%	1,089	57.5 sq mi (149 km^{2})	16.8/sq mi (6.5/km^{2})
Algansee	Township	Branch	2,033	1,974	+3.0%	2,061	35.53 sq mi (92.0 km^{2})	55.6/sq mi (21.5/km^{2})
Algoma	Township	Kent	12,055	9,932	+21.4%	7,596	34.13 sq mi (88.4 km^{2})	291.0/sq mi (112.4/km^{2})
Algonac	City	St. Clair	4,196	4,110	+2.1%	4,613	1.43 sq mi (3.7 km^{2})	2,874.1/sq mi (1,109.7/km^{2})
Allegan†	City	Allegan	5,222	4,998	+4.5%	4,838	3.85 sq mi (10.0 km^{2})	1,298.2/sq mi (501.2/km^{2})
Allegan	Township	Allegan	4,689	4,406	+6.4%	4,050	30.40 sq mi (78.7 km^{2})	144.9/sq mi (56.0/km^{2})
Allen	Village	Hillsdale	201	191	+5.2%	225	0.16 sq mi (0.41 km^{2})	1,193.8/sq mi (460.9/km^{2})
Allen	Township	Hillsdale	1,602	1,657	−3.3%	1,631	36.01 sq mi (93.3 km^{2})	46.0/sq mi (17.8/km^{2})
Allendale	Charter township	Ottawa	26,582	20,708	+28.4%	13,042	31.13 sq mi (80.6 km^{2})	665.2/sq mi (256.8/km^{2})
Allen Park	City	Wayne	28,638	28,210	+1.5%	29,376	7.00 sq mi (18.1 km^{2})	4,030.0/sq mi (1,556.0/km^{2})
Allis	Township	Presque Isle	925	948	−2.4%	1,035	64.75 sq mi (167.7 km^{2})	14.6/sq mi (5.7/km^{2})
Allouez	Township	Keweenaw	1,428	1,571	−9.1%	1,584	54.62 sq mi (141.5 km^{2})	28.8/sq mi (11.1/km^{2})
Alma	City	Gratiot	9,488	9,383	+1.1%	9,275	5.93 sq mi (15.4 km^{2})	1,582.3/sq mi (610.9/km^{2})
Almena	Township	Van Buren	5,308	4,992	+6.3%	4,226	34.41 sq mi (89.1 km^{2})	145.1/sq mi (56.0/km^{2})
Almer	Charter township	Tuscola	1,965	3,101	−36.6%	3,023	34.09 sq mi (88.3 km^{2})	91.0/sq mi (35.1/km^{2})
Almira	Township	Benzie	3,873	3,645	+6.3%	2,811	33.75 sq mi (87.4 km^{2})	108.0/sq mi (41.7/km^{2})
Almont	Village	Lapeer	2,846	2,674	+6.4%	2,803	1.42 sq mi (3.7 km^{2})	1,883.1/sq mi (727.1/km^{2})
Almont	Township	Lapeer	6,961	6,583	+5.7%	6041	36.66 sq mi (94.9 km^{2})	179.6/sq mi (69.3/km^{2})
Aloha	Township	Cheboygan	937	949	−1.3%	1,041	29.5 sq mi (76 km^{2})	32.2/sq mi (12.4/km^{2})
Alpena†	City	Alpena	10,197	10,483	−2.7%	11,304	8.54 sq mi (22.1 km^{2})	1,227.5/sq mi (473.9/km^{2})
Alpena	Charter township	Alpena	9,116	9,060	+0.6%	9,788	104.45 sq mi (270.5 km^{2})	86.7/sq mi (33.5/km^{2})
Alpha	Village	Iron	126	145	−13.1%	198	0.94 sq mi (2.4 km^{2})	154.3/sq mi (59.6/km^{2})
Alpine	Township	Kent	14,079	13,336	+5.6%	13,976	35.9 sq mi (93 km^{2})	371.5/sq mi (143.4/km^{2})
Amber	Township	Mason	2,529	2,535	−0.2%	2,054	27.55 sq mi (71.4 km^{2})	92.0/sq mi (35.5/km^{2})
Amboy	Township	Hillsdale	1,176	1,173	+0.3%	1,224	29.96 sq mi (77.6 km^{2})	39.2/sq mi (15.1/km^{2})
Ann Arbor†	City	Washtenaw	123,851	113,934	+8.7%	114,024	27.83 sq mi (72.1 km^{2})	4,093.9/sq mi (1,580.7/km^{2})
Ann Arbor	Charter township	Washtenaw	4,673	4,361	+7.2%	4,720	16.73 sq mi (43.3 km^{2})	260.7/sq mi (100.6/km^{2})
Antioch	Township	Wexford	900	815	+10.4%	810	35.22 sq mi (91.2 km^{2})	23.1/sq mi (8.9/km^{2})
Antrim	Township	Shiawassee	2,116	2,161	−2.1%	2,050	35.33 sq mi (91.5 km^{2})	61.2/sq mi (23.6/km^{2})
Antwerp	Township	Van Buren	13,425	12,182	+10.2%	10,813	34.69 sq mi (89.8 km^{2})	351.2/sq mi (135.6/km^{2})
Applegate	Village	Sanilac	241	248	−2.8%	287	1 sq mi (2.6 km^{2})	248.0/sq mi (95.8/km^{2})
Arbela	Township	Tuscola	2,808	3,070	−8.5%	3,219	33.46 sq mi (86.7 km^{2})	91.8/sq mi (35.4/km^{2})
Arcada	Township	Gratiot	1,671	1,681	−0.6%	1,708	32.17 sq mi (83.3 km^{2})	52.3/sq mi (20.2/km^{2})
Arcadia	Township	Lapeer	3,148	3,113	+1.1%	3,197	35.05 sq mi (90.8 km^{2})	88.8/sq mi (34.3/km^{2})
Arcadia	Township	Manistee	657	639	+2.8%	621	18.59 sq mi (48.1 km^{2})	34.4/sq mi (13.3/km^{2})
Arenac	Township	Arenac	871	903	−3.5%	992	35.77 sq mi (92.6 km^{2})	25.2/sq mi (9.7/km^{2})
Argentine	Township	Genesee	7,091	6,913	+2.6%	6,521	34.65 sq mi (89.7 km^{2})	199.5/sq mi (77.0/km^{2})
Argyle	Township	Sanilac	687	759	−9.5%	770	36.31 sq mi (94.0 km^{2})	20.9/sq mi (8.1/km^{2})
Arlington	Township	Van Buren	1,958	2,073	−5.5%	2,075	34.37 sq mi (89.0 km^{2})	60.3/sq mi (23.3/km^{2})
Armada	Village	Macomb	1,684	1,730	−2.7%	1,573	0.76 sq mi (2.0 km^{2})	2,276.3/sq mi (878.9/km^{2})
Armada	Township	Macomb	5,318	5,379	−1.1%	5,246	36.48 sq mi (94.5 km^{2})	147.5/sq mi (56.9/km^{2})
Arthur	Township	Clare	676	647	+4.5%	667	36.02 sq mi (93.3 km^{2})	18.0/sq mi (6.9/km^{2})
Arvon	Township	Baraga	492	450	+9.3%	482	123.96 sq mi (321.1 km^{2})	3.6/sq mi (1.4/km^{2})
Ash	Township	Monroe	7,860	7,783	+1.0%	7,610	34.60 sq mi (89.6 km^{2})	224.9/sq mi (86.9/km^{2})
Ashland	Township	Newaygo	2,764	2,773	−0.3%	2,570	34.42 sq mi (89.1 km^{2})	80.6/sq mi (31.1/km^{2})
Ashley	Village	Gratiot	508	563	−9.8%	526	0.64 sq mi (1.7 km^{2})	879.7/sq mi (339.6/km^{2})
Assyria	Township	Barry	1,992	1,986	+0.3%	1,912	35.87 sq mi (92.9 km^{2})	55.4/sq mi (21.4/km^{2})
Athens	Village	Calhoun	936	1,024	−8.6%	1,111	1.01 sq mi (2.6 km^{2})	1,013.9/sq mi (391.5/km^{2})
Athens	Township	Calhoun	2,444	2,554	−4.3%	2,571	35.94 sq mi (93.1 km^{2})	71.1/sq mi (27.4/km^{2})
Atlas	Township	Genesee	8,352	7,993	+4.5%	7,257	35.22 sq mi (91.2 km^{2})	226.9/sq mi (87.6/km^{2})
Attica	Township	Lapeer	4,706	4,755	−1.0%	4,678	35.09 sq mi (90.9 km^{2})	135.5/sq mi (52.3/km^{2})
Auburn	City	Bay	2,068	2,087	−0.9%	2,011	1.05 sq mi (2.7 km^{2})	1,987.6/sq mi (767.4/km^{2})
Auburn Hills	City	Oakland	24,360	21,412	+13.8%	19,837	16.6 sq mi (43 km^{2})	1,289.9/sq mi (498.0/km^{2})
Au Gres	City	Arenac	945	889	+6.3%	1,028	2.23 sq mi (5.8 km^{2})	398.7/sq mi (153.9/km^{2})
Au Gres	Township	Arenac	896	953	−6.0%	1,007	33.35 sq mi (86.4 km^{2})	28.6/sq mi (11.0/km^{2})
Augusta	Village	Kalamazoo	864	885	−2.4%	899	1.01 sq mi (2.6 km^{2})	876.2/sq mi (338.3/km^{2})
Augusta	Charter township	Washtenaw	7,083	6,745	+5.0%	4,813	36.70 sq mi (95.1 km^{2})	183.8/sq mi (71.0/km^{2})
Aurelius	Township	Ingham	4,354	3,525	+23.5%	3,318	36.41 sq mi (94.3 km^{2})	96.8/sq mi (37.4/km^{2})
Au Sable	Charter township	Iosco	2,016	2,047	−1.5%	2,230	20.63 sq mi (53.4 km^{2})	99.2/sq mi (38.3/km^{2})
Au Sable	Township	Roscommon	236	255	−7.5%	281	35.66 sq mi (92.4 km^{2})	7.2/sq mi (2.8/km^{2})
Austin	Township	Mecosta	1,715	1,561	+9.9%	1,415	35.67 sq mi (92.4 km^{2})	43.8/sq mi (16.9/km^{2})
Austin	Township	Sanilac	619	665	−6.9%	673	36.15 sq mi (93.6 km^{2})	18.4/sq mi (7.1/km^{2})
Au Train	Township	Alger	1,019	1,138	−10.5%	1,172	141.27 sq mi (365.9 km^{2})	8.1/sq mi (3.1/km^{2})
Avery	Township	Montmorency	662	646	+2.5%	717	35.02 sq mi (90.7 km^{2})	18.4/sq mi (7.1/km^{2})
Backus	Township	Roscommon	294	330	−10.9%	350	34.36 sq mi (89.0 km^{2})	9.6/sq mi (3.7/km^{2})
Bad Axe†	City	Huron	3,021	3,129	−3.5%	3,462	2.26 sq mi (5.9 km^{2})	1,384.5/sq mi (534.6/km^{2})
Bagley	Township	Otsego	5,867	5,886	−0.3%	5,838	28.10 sq mi (72.8 km^{2})	209.5/sq mi (80.9/km^{2})
Bainbridge	Township	Berrien	2,682	2,850	−5.9%	3,132	34.90 sq mi (90.4 km^{2})	81.7/sq mi (31.5/km^{2})
Baldwin	Township	Delta	700	759	−7.8%	748	83.86 sq mi (217.2 km^{2})	9.1/sq mi (3.5/km^{2})
Baldwin	Township	Iosco	1,614	1,694	−4.7%	1,726	28.42 sq mi (73.6 km^{2})	59.6/sq mi (23.0/km^{2})
Baldwin†	Village	Lake	902	1,208	−25.3%	1,107	1.26 sq mi (3.3 km^{2})	958.7/sq mi (370.2/km^{2})
Baltimore	Township	Barry	1,947	1,861	+4.6%	1,845	35.42 sq mi (91.7 km^{2})	52.5/sq mi (20.3/km^{2})
Bancroft	Village	Shiawassee	484	545	−11.2%	616	0.58 sq mi (1.5 km^{2})	939.7/sq mi (362.8/km^{2})
Bangor	Charter township	Bay	14,045	14,641	−4.1%	15,547	14.10 sq mi (36.5 km^{2})	1,038.4/sq mi (400.9/km^{2})
Bangor	City	Van Buren	2,016	1,885	+6.9%	1,933	1.83 sq mi (4.7 km^{2})	1,030.1/sq mi (397.7/km^{2})
Bangor	Township	Van Buren	1,939	2,147	−9.7%	2,121	33.70 sq mi (87.3 km^{2})	63.7/sq mi (24.6/km^{2})
Banks	Township	Antrim	1,588	1,609	−1.3%	1,813	44.94 sq mi (116.4 km^{2})	35.8/sq mi (13.8/km^{2})
Baraga	Village	Baraga	1,883	2,053	−8.3%	1,285	2.12 sq mi (5.5 km^{2})	968.4/sq mi (373.9/km^{2})
Baraga	Township	Baraga	3,478	3,815	−8.8%	3,542	183.80 sq mi (476.0 km^{2})	20.8/sq mi (8.0/km^{2})
Bark River	Township	Delta	1,595	1,578	+1.1%	1,650	45.59 sq mi (118.1 km^{2})	34.6/sq mi (13.4/km^{2})
Baroda	Village	Berrien	875	873	+0.2%	858	0.72 sq mi (1.9 km^{2})	1,212.5/sq mi (468.1/km^{2})
Baroda	Township	Berrien	2,835	2,801	+1.2%	2,880	17.77 sq mi (46.0 km^{2})	157.6/sq mi (60.9/km^{2})
Barry	Township	Barry	3,417	3,378	+1.2%	3,489	34.43 sq mi (89.2 km^{2})	98.1/sq mi (37.9/km^{2})
Barryton	Village	Mecosta	405	355	+14.1%	381	0.96 sq mi (2.5 km^{2})	369.8/sq mi (142.8/km^{2})
Barton	Township	Newaygo	706	717	−1.5%	820	35.06 sq mi (90.8 km^{2})	20.5/sq mi (7.9/km^{2})
Barton Hills	Village	Washtenaw	316	294	+7.5%	335	0.75 sq mi (1.9 km^{2})	392.0/sq mi (151.4/km^{2})
Batavia	Township	Branch	1,323	1,339	−1.2%	1,546	35.73 sq mi (92.5 km^{2})	37.5/sq mi (14.5/km^{2})
Bates	Township	Iron	925	921	+0.4%	1,021	125.69 sq mi (325.5 km^{2})	7.3/sq mi (2.8/km^{2})
Bath	Charter township	Clinton	13,292	11,598	+14.6%	7,541	31.83 sq mi (82.4 km^{2})	364.4/sq mi (140.7/km^{2})
Battle Creek	City	Calhoun	52,721	52,347	+0.7%	53,364	42.61 sq mi (110.4 km^{2})	1,228.5/sq mi (474.3/km^{2})
Bay	Township	Charlevoix	1,142	1,122	+1.8%	1,068	15.55 sq mi (40.3 km^{2})	72.2/sq mi (27.9/km^{2})
Bay City†	City	Bay	32,661	34,932	−6.5%	36,817	10.17 sq mi (26.3 km^{2})	3,434.8/sq mi (1,326.2/km^{2})
Bay de Noc	Township	Delta	300	305	−1.6%	329	67.66 sq mi (175.2 km^{2})	4.5/sq mi (1.7/km^{2})
Bay Mills	Township	Chippewa	1,567	1,477	+6.1%	1,214	64.72 sq mi (167.6 km^{2})	22.8/sq mi (8.8/km^{2})
Bear Creek	Township	Emmet	6,542	6,201	+5.5%	5,269	39.57 sq mi (102.5 km^{2})	156.7/sq mi (60.5/km^{2})
Bearinger	Township	Presque Isle	371	369	+0.5%	329	61.44 sq mi (159.1 km^{2})	6.0/sq mi (2.3/km^{2})
Bear Lake	Township	Kalkaska	668	667	+0.1%	746	71.09 sq mi (184.1 km^{2})	9.4/sq mi (3.6/km^{2})
Bear Lake	Village	Manistee	342	286	+19.6%	318	0.31 sq mi (0.80 km^{2})	922.6/sq mi (356.2/km^{2})
Bear Lake	Township	Manistee	1,831	1,751	+4.6%	1,587	34.69 sq mi (89.8 km^{2})	50.5/sq mi (19.5/km^{2})
Beaugrand	Township	Cheboygan	1,092	1,168	−6.5%	1,157	23.83 sq mi (61.7 km^{2})	49.0/sq mi (18.9/km^{2})
Beaver	Township	Bay	2,723	2,885	−5.6%	2,806	35.34 sq mi (91.5 km^{2})	81.6/sq mi (31.5/km^{2})
Beaver	Township	Newaygo	463	509	−9.0%	608	32.06 sq mi (83.0 km^{2})	15.9/sq mi (6.1/km^{2})
Beaver Creek	Township	Crawford	1,515	1,736	−12.7%	1,486	71.46 sq mi (185.1 km^{2})	24.3/sq mi (9.4/km^{2})
Beaverton	City	Gladwin	1,145	1,071	+6.9%	1,106	1.03 sq mi (2.7 km^{2})	1,039.8/sq mi (401.5/km^{2})
Beaverton	Township	Gladwin	1,863	1,964	−5.1%	1,815	35.03 sq mi (90.7 km^{2})	56.1/sq mi (21.6/km^{2})
Bedford	Charter township	Calhoun	9,198	9,357	−1.7%	9,517	29.10 sq mi (75.4 km^{2})	321.5/sq mi (124.1/km^{2})
Bedford	Township	Monroe	31,813	31,085	+2.3%	28,606	39.19 sq mi (101.5 km^{2})	793.2/sq mi (306.3/km^{2})
Belding	City	Ionia	5,938	5,757	+3.1%	5,877	4.72 sq mi (12.2 km^{2})	1,219.7/sq mi (470.9/km^{2})
Belknap	Township	Presque Isle	686	751	−8.7%	854	35.70 sq mi (92.5 km^{2})	21.0/sq mi (8.1/km^{2})
Bellaire†	Village	Antrim	1,053	1,086	−3.0%	1,164	1.84 sq mi (4.8 km^{2})	590.2/sq mi (227.9/km^{2})
Belleville	City	Wayne	4,008	3,991	+0.4%	3,997	1.14 sq mi (3.0 km^{2})	3,500.9/sq mi (1,351.7/km^{2})
Bellevue	Village	Eaton	1,308	1,282	+2.0%	1,365	1.02 sq mi (2.6 km^{2})	1,256.9/sq mi (485.3/km^{2})
Bellevue	Township	Eaton	3,200	3,150	+1.6%	3,144	36.38 sq mi (94.2 km^{2})	86.6/sq mi (33.4/km^{2})
Belvidere	Township	Montcalm	2,135	2,209	−3.3%	2,438	34.62 sq mi (89.7 km^{2})	63.8/sq mi (24.6/km^{2})
Bengal	Township	Clinton	1,138	1,188	−4.2%	1,174	36.53 sq mi (94.6 km^{2})	32.5/sq mi (12.6/km^{2})
Bennington	Township	Shiawassee	3,119	3,168	−1.5%	3,017	35.48 sq mi (91.9 km^{2})	89.3/sq mi (34.5/km^{2})
Benona	Township	Oceana	1,425	1,437	−0.8%	1,520	40.38 sq mi (104.6 km^{2})	35.6/sq mi (13.7/km^{2})
Bentley	Township	Gladwin	829	844	−1.8%	859	34.70 sq mi (89.9 km^{2})	24.3/sq mi (9.4/km^{2})
Benton	Charter township	Berrien	14,374	14,749	−2.5%	16,404	32.37 sq mi (83.8 km^{2})	455.6/sq mi (175.9/km^{2})
Benton	Township	Cheboygan	3,133	3,206	−2.3%	3,080	58.66 sq mi (151.9 km^{2})	54.7/sq mi (21.1/km^{2})
Benton	Charter township	Eaton	2,766	2,796	−1.1%	2,712	33.54 sq mi (86.9 km^{2})	83.4/sq mi (32.2/km^{2})
Benton Harbor	City	Berrien	9,103	10,038	−9.3%	11,182	4.43 sq mi (11.5 km^{2})	2,265.9/sq mi (874.9/km^{2})
Benzonia	Village	Benzie	551	497	+10.9%	519	1.13 sq mi (2.9 km^{2})	439.8/sq mi (169.8/km^{2})
Benzonia	Township	Benzie	2,734	2,727	+0.3%	2,839	27.81 sq mi (72.0 km^{2})	98.1/sq mi (37.9/km^{2})
Bergland	Township	Ontonagon	438	467	−6.2%	550	98.50 sq mi (255.1 km^{2})	4.7/sq mi (1.8/km^{2})
Berkley	City	Oakland	15,194	14,970	+1.5%	15,531	2.61 sq mi (6.8 km^{2})	5,735.6/sq mi (2,214.5/km^{2})
Berlin	Township	Ionia	2,138	2,116	+1.0%	2,787	41.55 sq mi (107.6 km^{2})	50.9/sq mi (19.7/km^{2})
Berlin	Charter township	Monroe	9,890	9,299	+6.4%	6,924	32.00 sq mi (82.9 km^{2})	290.6/sq mi (112.2/km^{2})
Berlin	Township	St. Clair	3,115	3,285	−5.2%	3,162	37.12 sq mi (96.1 km^{2})	88.5/sq mi (34.2/km^{2})
Berrien	Township	Berrien	4,868	5,084	−4.2%	5,075	35.07 sq mi (90.8 km^{2})	145.0/sq mi (56.0/km^{2})
Berrien Springs	Village	Berrien	1,910	1,800	+6.1%	1,862	0.94 sq mi (2.4 km^{2})	1,914.9/sq mi (739.3/km^{2})
Bertrand	Charter township	Berrien	2,611	2,657	−1.7%	2,380	34.44 sq mi (89.2 km^{2})	77.1/sq mi (29.8/km^{2})
Bessemer†	City	Gogebic	1,805	1,905	−5.2%	2,148	5.47 sq mi (14.2 km^{2})	348.3/sq mi (134.5/km^{2})
Bessemer	Township	Gogebic	1,135	1,176	−3.5%	1,270	113.73 sq mi (294.6 km^{2})	10.3/sq mi (4.0/km^{2})
Bethany	Township	Gratiot	1,773	1,407	+26.0%	3,492	34.57 sq mi (89.5 km^{2})	40.7/sq mi (15.7/km^{2})
Bethel	Township	Branch	1,431	1,434	−0.2%	1,421	35.83 sq mi (92.8 km^{2})	40.0/sq mi (15.5/km^{2})
Beulah†	Village	Benzie	313	342	−8.5%	363	0.43 sq mi (1.1 km^{2})	795.3/sq mi (307.1/km^{2})
Beverly Hills	Village	Oakland	10,584	10,267	+3.1%	10,437	4.00 sq mi (10.4 km^{2})	2,566.8/sq mi (991.0/km^{2})
Big Creek	Township	Oscoda	2,604	2,827	−7.9%	3,380	141.66 sq mi (366.9 km^{2})	20.0/sq mi (7.7/km^{2})
Big Prairie	Township	Newaygo	2,436	2,573	−5.3%	2,465	31.39 sq mi (81.3 km^{2})	82.0/sq mi (31.6/km^{2})
Big Rapids†	City	Mecosta	7,727	10,601	−27.1%	10,849	4.36 sq mi (11.3 km^{2})	2,431.4/sq mi (938.8/km^{2})
Big Rapids	Charter township	Mecosta	3,917	4,208	−6.9%	3,249	30.53 sq mi (79.1 km^{2})	137.8/sq mi (53.2/km^{2})
Billings	Township	Gladwin	2,318	2,416	−4.1%	2,715	21.56 sq mi (55.8 km^{2})	112.1/sq mi (43.3/km^{2})
Bingham	Township	Clinton	2,919	2,859	+2.1%	2,776	32.39 sq mi (83.9 km^{2})	88.3/sq mi (34.1/km^{2})
Bingham	Township	Huron	1,642	1,709	−3.9%	1,751	35.76 sq mi (92.6 km^{2})	47.8/sq mi (18.5/km^{2})
Bingham	Township	Leelanau	2,577	2,497	+3.2%	2,425	23.57 sq mi (61.0 km^{2})	105.9/sq mi (40.9/km^{2})
Bingham Farms	Village	Oakland	1,124	1,111	+1.2%	1,030	1.21 sq mi (3.1 km^{2})	918.2/sq mi (354.5/km^{2})
Birch Run	Village	Saginaw	1,525	1,555	−1.9%	1,653	1.89 sq mi (4.9 km^{2})	822.8/sq mi (317.7/km^{2})
Birch Run	Township	Saginaw	5,888	6,033	−2.4%	6,191	35.51 sq mi (92.0 km^{2})	169.9/sq mi (65.6/km^{2})
Birmingham	City	Oakland	21,813	20,103	+8.5%	19,291	4.79 sq mi (12.4 km^{2})	4,196.9/sq mi (1,620.4/km^{2})
Bismarck	Township	Presque Isle	351	386	−9.1%	408	67.51 sq mi (174.9 km^{2})	5.7/sq mi (2.2/km^{2})
Blackman	Charter township	Jackson	25,642	24,051	+6.6%	22,800	31.71 sq mi (82.1 km^{2})	758.5/sq mi (292.8/km^{2})
Blaine	Township	Benzie	484	551	−12.2%	491	19.43 sq mi (50.3 km^{2})	28.4/sq mi (10.9/km^{2})
Blair	Township	Grand Traverse	8,994	8,209	+9.6%	6,448	35.61 sq mi (92.2 km^{2})	230.5/sq mi (89.0/km^{2})
Blendon	Township	Ottawa	7,081	5,772	+22.7%	5,721	36.36 sq mi (94.2 km^{2})	158.7/sq mi (61.3/km^{2})
Bliss	Township	Emmet	568	620	−8.4%	572	43.66 sq mi (113.1 km^{2})	14.2/sq mi (5.5/km^{2})
Blissfield	Village	Lenawee	3,277	3,340	−1.9%	3,223	2.24 sq mi (5.8 km^{2})	1,491.1/sq mi (575.7/km^{2})
Blissfield	Township	Lenawee	3,924	3,973	−1.2%	3,915	20.88 sq mi (54.1 km^{2})	190.3/sq mi (73.5/km^{2})
Bloomer	Township	Montcalm	6,352	3,904	+62.7%	3,039	34.77 sq mi (90.1 km^{2})	112.3/sq mi (43.4/km^{2})
Bloomfield	Township	Huron	404	455	−11.2%	535	35.74 sq mi (92.6 km^{2})	12.7/sq mi (4.9/km^{2})
Bloomfield	Township	Missaukee	574	531	+8.1%	475	35.54 sq mi (92.0 km^{2})	14.9/sq mi (5.8/km^{2})
Bloomfield	Charter township	Oakland	44,253	41,070	+7.8%	43,023	24.63 sq mi (63.8 km^{2})	1,667.5/sq mi (643.8/km^{2})
Bloomfield Hills	City	Oakland	4,460	3,869	+15.3%	3,940	4.96 sq mi (12.8 km^{2})	780.0/sq mi (301.2/km^{2})
Bloomingdale	Village	Van Buren	513	454	+13.0%	528	1.14 sq mi (3.0 km^{2})	398.2/sq mi (153.8/km^{2})
Bloomingdale	Township	Van Buren	2,930	3,103	−5.6%	3,364	33.91 sq mi (87.8 km^{2})	91.5/sq mi (35.3/km^{2})
Blue Lake	Township	Kalkaska	393	387	+1.6%	428	34.96 sq mi (90.5 km^{2})	11.1/sq mi (4.3/km^{2})
Blue Lake	Township	Muskegon	2,416	2,399	+0.7%	1,990	32.25 sq mi (83.5 km^{2})	74.4/sq mi (28.7/km^{2})
Blumfield	Township	Saginaw	1,874	1,960	−4.4%	2,014	35.65 sq mi (92.3 km^{2})	55.0/sq mi (21.2/km^{2})
Boardman	Township	Kalkaska	1,479	1,530	−3.3%	1,373	36.05 sq mi (93.4 km^{2})	42.4/sq mi (16.4/km^{2})
Bohemia	Township	Ontonagon	75	82	−8.5%	77	91.86 sq mi (237.9 km^{2})	0.9/sq mi (0.3/km^{2})
Bois Blanc	Township	Mackinac	100	95	+5.3%	71	35.11 sq mi (90.9 km^{2})	2.7/sq mi (1.0/km^{2})
Boon	Township	Wexford	650	687	−5.4%	670	36.01 sq mi (93.3 km^{2})	19.1/sq mi (7.4/km^{2})
Boston	Township	Ionia	6,021	5,709	+5.5%	4,961	35.08 sq mi (90.9 km^{2})	162.7/sq mi (62.8/km^{2})
Bourret	Township	Gladwin	390	461	−15.4%	471	32.34 sq mi (83.8 km^{2})	14.3/sq mi (5.5/km^{2})
Bowne	Township	Kent	3,289	3,084	+6.6%	2,743	35.53 sq mi (92.0 km^{2})	86.8/sq mi (33.5/km^{2})
Boyne City	City	Charlevoix	3,816	3,735	+2.2%	3,503	4.06 sq mi (10.5 km^{2})	920.0/sq mi (355.2/km^{2})
Boyne Falls	Village	Charlevoix	358	294	+21.8%	370	0.55 sq mi (1.4 km^{2})	534.5/sq mi (206.4/km^{2})
Boyne Valley	Township	Charlevoix	1,425	1,195	+19.2%	1,215	34.78 sq mi (90.1 km^{2})	34.4/sq mi (13.3/km^{2})
Brady	Charter township	Kalamazoo	4,445	4,248	+4.6%	4,263	34.83 sq mi (90.2 km^{2})	122.0/sq mi (47.1/km^{2})
Brady	Township	Saginaw	2,142	2,218	−3.4%	2,344	36.75 sq mi (95.2 km^{2})	60.4/sq mi (23.3/km^{2})
Brampton	Township	Delta	1,023	1,050	−2.6%	1,090	23.74 sq mi (61.5 km^{2})	44.2/sq mi (17.1/km^{2})
Branch	Township	Mason	1,405	1,328	+5.8%	1,181	35.39 sq mi (91.7 km^{2})	37.5/sq mi (14.5/km^{2})
Brandon	Charter township	Oakland	15,384	15,175	+1.4%	14,765	35.11 sq mi (90.9 km^{2})	432.2/sq mi (166.9/km^{2})
Brant	Township	Saginaw	1,842	2,012	−8.4%	2,023	36.84 sq mi (95.4 km^{2})	54.6/sq mi (21.1/km^{2})
Breckenridge	Village	Gratiot	1,238	1,328	−6.8%	1,339	1.07 sq mi (2.8 km^{2})	1,241.1/sq mi (479.2/km^{2})
Breedsville	Village	Van Buren	202	199	+1.5%	235	0.65 sq mi (1.7 km^{2})	306.2/sq mi (118.2/km^{2})
Breen	Township	Dickinson	471	499	−5.6%	479	86.69 sq mi (224.5 km^{2})	5.8/sq mi (2.2/km^{2})
Breitung	Charter township	Dickinson	5,831	5,853	−0.4%	5,930	64.27 sq mi (166.5 km^{2})	91.1/sq mi (35.2/km^{2})
Brevort	Township	Mackinac	502	594	−15.5%	649	92.48 sq mi (239.5 km^{2})	6.4/sq mi (2.5/km^{2})
Bridgehampton	Township	Sanilac	745	854	−12.8%	911	36.11 sq mi (93.5 km^{2})	23.6/sq mi (9.1/km^{2})
Bridgeport	Charter township	Saginaw	10,104	10,514	−3.9%	11,709	34.43 sq mi (89.2 km^{2})	305.4/sq mi (117.9/km^{2})
Bridgeton	Township	Newaygo	2,224	2,141	+3.9%	2,098	35.49 sq mi (91.9 km^{2})	60.3/sq mi (23.3/km^{2})
Bridgewater	Township	Washtenaw	1,615	1,674	−3.5%	1,646	36.16 sq mi (93.7 km^{2})	46.3/sq mi (17.9/km^{2})
Bridgman	City	Berrien	2,096	2,291	−8.5%	2,428	2.90 sq mi (7.5 km^{2})	790.0/sq mi (305.0/km^{2})
Brighton	City	Livingston	7,446	7,444	0.0%	6,701	3.56 sq mi (9.2 km^{2})	2,091.0/sq mi (807.3/km^{2})
Brighton	Charter township	Livingston	19,144	17,791	+7.6%	17,673	32.96 sq mi (85.4 km^{2})	539.8/sq mi (208.4/km^{2})
Briley†	Township	Montmorency	1,697	1,860	−8.8%	2,029	68.36 sq mi (177.1 km^{2})	27.2/sq mi (10.5/km^{2})
Britton	Village	Lenawee	537	586	−8.4%	699	0.79 sq mi (2.0 km^{2})	741.8/sq mi (286.4/km^{2})
Brockway	Township	St. Clair	1,897	2,022	−6.2%	1,900	33.66 sq mi (87.2 km^{2})	60.1/sq mi (23.2/km^{2})
Bronson	City	Branch	2,307	2,349	−1.8%	2,421	1.37 sq mi (3.5 km^{2})	1,714.6/sq mi (662.0/km^{2})
Bronson	Township	Branch	1,288	1,349	−4.5%	1,358	34.62 sq mi (89.7 km^{2})	39.0/sq mi (15.0/km^{2})
Brookfield	Township	Eaton	1,467	1,537	−4.6%	1,429	36.07 sq mi (93.4 km^{2})	42.6/sq mi (16.5/km^{2})
Brookfield	Township	Huron	739	760	−2.8%	914	35.49 sq mi (91.9 km^{2})	21.4/sq mi (8.3/km^{2})
Brooklyn	Village	Jackson	1,313	1,206	+8.9%	1,176	1.01 sq mi (2.6 km^{2})	1,194.1/sq mi (461.0/km^{2})
Brooks	Township	Newaygo	3,705	3,510	+5.6%	3,671	31.57 sq mi (81.8 km^{2})	111.2/sq mi (42.9/km^{2})
Broomfield	Township	Isabella	1,857	1,849	+0.4%	1,620	34.92 sq mi (90.4 km^{2})	52.9/sq mi (20.4/km^{2})
Brown	Township	Manistee	704	747	−5.8%	712	35.64 sq mi (92.3 km^{2})	21.0/sq mi (8.1/km^{2})
Brown City	City	Sanilac, Lapeer	1,302	1,325	−1.7%	1,334	1.09 sq mi (2.8 km^{2})	1,215.6/sq mi (469.3/km^{2})
Brownstown	Charter township	Wayne	33,194	30,627	+8.4%	22,989	22.19 sq mi (57.5 km^{2})	1,380.2/sq mi (532.9/km^{2})
Bruce	Township	Chippewa	2,000	2,128	−6.0%	1,940	86.98 sq mi (225.3 km^{2})	24.5/sq mi (9.4/km^{2})
Bruce	Township	Macomb	9,324	8,700	+7.2%	8,158	36.75 sq mi (95.2 km^{2})	236.7/sq mi (91.4/km^{2})
Buchanan	City	Berrien	4,300	4,456	−3.5%	4,681	2.50 sq mi (6.5 km^{2})	1,782.4/sq mi (688.2/km^{2})
Buchanan	Township	Berrien	3,436	3,523	−2.5%	3,510	32.14 sq mi (83.2 km^{2})	109.6/sq mi (42.3/km^{2})
Buckeye	Township	Gladwin	1,360	1,308	+4.0%	1,333	34.17 sq mi (88.5 km^{2})	38.3/sq mi (14.8/km^{2})
Buckley	Village	Wexford	775	697	+11.2%	550	1.78 sq mi (4.6 km^{2})	391.6/sq mi (151.2/km^{2})
Buel	Township	Sanilac	1,161	1,265	−8.2%	1,237	37.64 sq mi (97.5 km^{2})	33.6/sq mi (13.0/km^{2})
Buena Vista	Charter township	Saginaw	7,664	8,676	−11.7%	10,318	35.48 sq mi (91.9 km^{2})	244.5/sq mi (94.4/km^{2})
Bunker Hill	Township	Ingham	1,966	2,119	−7.2%	1,979	32.88 sq mi (85.2 km^{2})	64.4/sq mi (24.9/km^{2})
Burdell	Township	Osceola	1,410	1,331	+5.9%	1,241	37.33 sq mi (96.7 km^{2})	35.7/sq mi (13.8/km^{2})
Burleigh	Township	Iosco	726	787	−7.8%	775	34.64 sq mi (89.7 km^{2})	22.7/sq mi (8.8/km^{2})
Burlington	Village	Calhoun	281	261	+7.7%	405	0.65 sq mi (1.7 km^{2})	401.5/sq mi (155.0/km^{2})
Burlington	Township	Calhoun	1,957	1,941	+0.8%	1,929	35.70 sq mi (92.5 km^{2})	54.4/sq mi (21.0/km^{2})
Burlington	Township	Lapeer	1,414	1,478	−4.3%	1,402	34.99 sq mi (90.6 km^{2})	42.2/sq mi (16.3/km^{2})
Burns	Township	Shiawassee	3,280	3,457	−5.1%	3,500	35.30 sq mi (91.4 km^{2})	97.9/sq mi (37.8/km^{2})
Burnside	Township	Lapeer	1,904	1,864	+2.1%	1920	53.37 sq mi (138.2 km^{2})	34.9/sq mi (13.5/km^{2})
Burr Oak	Village	St. Joseph	753	828	−9.1%	797	1.00 sq mi (2.6 km^{2})	828.0/sq mi (319.7/km^{2})
Burr Oak	Township	St. Joseph	2,639	2,611	+1.1%	2739	35.25 sq mi (91.3 km^{2})	74.1/sq mi (28.6/km^{2})
Burt	Township	Alger	411	522	−21.3%	480	230.48 sq mi (596.9 km^{2})	2.3/sq mi (0.9/km^{2})
Burt	Township	Cheboygan	710	680	+4.4%	654	19.73 sq mi (51.1 km^{2})	34.5/sq mi (13.3/km^{2})
Burtchville	Township	St. Clair	4,077	4,008	+1.7%	3,956	15.55 sq mi (40.3 km^{2})	257.7/sq mi (99.5/km^{2})
Burton	City	Genesee	29,715	29,999	−0.9%	30,308	23.36 sq mi (60.5 km^{2})	1,284.2/sq mi (495.8/km^{2})
Bushnell	Township	Montcalm	1,516	1,604	−5.5%	2,111	35.59 sq mi (92.2 km^{2})	45.1/sq mi (17.4/km^{2})
Butler	Township	Branch	1,417	1,467	−3.4%	1,362	35.63 sq mi (92.3 km^{2})	41.2/sq mi (15.9/km^{2})
Butman	Township	Gladwin	2,086	1,999	+4.4%	1,947	34.00 sq mi (88.1 km^{2})	58.8/sq mi (22.7/km^{2})
Butterfield	Township	Missaukee	473	489	−3.3%	548	35.40 sq mi (91.7 km^{2})	13.8/sq mi (5.3/km^{2})
Byron	Township	Kent	26,927	20,317	+32.5%	17,553	36.1 sq mi (93 km^{2})	562.8/sq mi (217.3/km^{2})
Byron	Village	Shiawassee	545	581	−6.2%	595	0.70 sq mi (1.8 km^{2})	830.0/sq mi (320.5/km^{2})
Cadillac†	City	Wexford	10,371	10,355	+0.2%	10,000	7.16 sq mi (18.5 km^{2})	1,446.2/sq mi (558.4/km^{2})
Caldwell	Township	Missaukee	1,394	1,317	+5.8%	1,363	34.21 sq mi (88.6 km^{2})	38.5/sq mi (14.9/km^{2})
Caledonia	Township	Alcona	1,032	1,161	−11.1%	1,203	67.58 sq mi (175.0 km^{2})	17.2/sq mi (6.6/km^{2})
Caledonia	Village	Kent	1,622	1,511	+7.3%	1,102	1.33 sq mi (3.4 km^{2})	1,136.1/sq mi (438.6/km^{2})
Caledonia	Charter township	Kent	15,811	12,332	+28.2%	8,964	34.91 sq mi (90.4 km^{2})	353.3/sq mi (136.4/km^{2})
Caledonia	Charter township	Shiawassee	4,360	4,475	−2.6%	4,427	31.12 sq mi (80.6 km^{2})	143.8/sq mi (55.5/km^{2})
California	Township	Branch	1,181	1,040	+13.6%	909	21.26 sq mi (55.1 km^{2})	48.9/sq mi (18.9/km^{2})
Calumet	Village	Houghton	621	726	−14.5%	879	0.20 sq mi (0.52 km^{2})	3,630.0/sq mi (1,401.6/km^{2})
Calumet	Charter township	Houghton	6,263	6,489	−3.5%	6,997	33.16 sq mi (85.9 km^{2})	195.7/sq mi (75.6/km^{2})
Calvin	Township	Cass	1,993	2,037	−2.2%	2,041	34.34 sq mi (88.9 km^{2})	59.3/sq mi (22.9/km^{2})
Cambria	Township	Hillsdale	2,552	2,533	+0.8%	2,546	34.81 sq mi (90.2 km^{2})	72.8/sq mi (28.1/km^{2})
Cambridge	Township	Lenawee	5,722	5,733	−0.2%	5,299	31.85 sq mi (82.5 km^{2})	180.0/sq mi (69.5/km^{2})
Camden	Village	Hillsdale	496	512	−3.1%	550	0.84 sq mi (2.2 km^{2})	609.5/sq mi (235.3/km^{2})
Camden	Township	Hillsdale	2,070	2,047	+1.1%	2,088	42.36 sq mi (109.7 km^{2})	48.3/sq mi (18.7/km^{2})
Campbell	Township	Ionia	2,399	2,388	+0.5%	2,243	35.73 sq mi (92.5 km^{2})	66.8/sq mi (25.8/km^{2})
Cannon	Township	Kent	14,379	13,336	+7.8%	12,075	35.26 sq mi (91.3 km^{2})	378.2/sq mi (146.0/km^{2})
Canton	Charter township	Wayne	98,659	90,173	+9.4%	76,366	36.11 sq mi (93.5 km^{2})	2,497.2/sq mi (964.2/km^{2})
Capac	Village	St. Clair	1,983	1,890	+4.9%	1,775	1.83 sq mi (4.7 km^{2})	1,032.8/sq mi (398.8/km^{2})
Carleton	Village	Monroe	2,326	2,345	−0.8%	2,562	0.99 sq mi (2.6 km^{2})	2,368.7/sq mi (914.6/km^{2})
Carlton	Township	Barry	2,368	2,391	−1.0%	2,331	35.13 sq mi (91.0 km^{2})	68.1/sq mi (26.3/km^{2})
Carmel	Township	Eaton	2,839	2,855	−0.6%	2,626	34.02 sq mi (88.1 km^{2})	83.9/sq mi (32.4/km^{2})
Carney	Village	Menominee	179	192	−6.8%	225	1.00 sq mi (2.6 km^{2})	192.0/sq mi (74.1/km^{2})
Caro†	City	Tuscola	4,328	4,229	+2.3%	4,145	2.79 sq mi (7.2 km^{2})	1,515.8/sq mi (585.2/km^{2})
Carp Lake	Township	Emmet	748	759	−1.4%	807	32.35 sq mi (83.8 km^{2})	23.5/sq mi (9.1/km^{2})
Carp Lake	Township	Ontonagon	582	722	−19.4%	891	224.84 sq mi (582.3 km^{2})	3.2/sq mi (1.2/km^{2})
Carrollton	Township	Saginaw	5,750	6,103	−5.8%	6,602	3.34 sq mi (8.7 km^{2})	1,827.2/sq mi (705.5/km^{2})
Carson City	City	Montcalm	1,120	1,093	+2.5%	1,190	1.04 sq mi (2.7 km^{2})	1,051.0/sq mi (405.8/km^{2})
Carsonville	Village	Sanilac	465	527	−11.8%	502	1.13 sq mi (2.9 km^{2})	466.4/sq mi (180.1/km^{2})
Cascade	Charter township	Kent	19,667	17,134	+14.8%	15,107	33.88 sq mi (87.7 km^{2})	505.7/sq mi (195.3/km^{2})
Casco	Township	Allegan	2,796	2,823	−1.0%	3,019	38.87 sq mi (100.7 km^{2})	72.6/sq mi (28.0/km^{2})
Casco	Township	St. Clair	3,990	4,105	−2.8%	4,747	36.88 sq mi (95.5 km^{2})	111.3/sq mi (43.0/km^{2})
Case	Township	Presque Isle	819	903	−9.3%	942	67.20 sq mi (174.0 km^{2})	13.4/sq mi (5.2/km^{2})
Caseville	City	Huron	652	777	−16.1%	888	1.10 sq mi (2.8 km^{2})	706.4/sq mi (272.7/km^{2})
Caseville	Township	Huron	1,674	2,570	−34.9%	2,723	13.72 sq mi (35.5 km^{2})	187.3/sq mi (72.3/km^{2})
Casnovia	Village	Kent; Muskegon	316	319	−0.9%	315	1.08 sq mi (2.8 km^{2})	295.4/sq mi (114.0/km^{2})
Casnovia	Township	Muskegon	2,793	2,805	−0.4%	2,652	35.60 sq mi (92.2 km^{2})	78.8/sq mi (30.4/km^{2})
Caspian	City	Iron	805	906	−11.1%	997	1.42 sq mi (3.7 km^{2})	638.0/sq mi (246.3/km^{2})
Cass City	Village	Tuscola	2,494	2,428	+2.7%	2,643	1.78 sq mi (4.6 km^{2})	1,364.0/sq mi (526.7/km^{2})
Cass Lake (Note: The Village of Cass Lake incorporated as a village in August 2026 with a temporary placeholder name of the Village of Lakeside Park.)	Village	Oakland	437	0	NA (Note: Approximate population, as Cass Lake incorporated as a village since the last release of census data.)	0	0.3 sq mi (0.78 km^{2}) (Note: Approximate area, as Cass Lake incorporated as a village since the last release of census data.)	1,456.7/sq mi (562.4/km^{2})
Cassopolis†	Village	Cass	1,712	1,774	−3.5%	1,740	2.00 sq mi (5.2 km^{2})	887.0/sq mi (342.5/km^{2})
Castleton	Township	Barry	3,329	3,471	−4.1%	3,475	34.97 sq mi (90.6 km^{2})	99.3/sq mi (38.3/km^{2})
Cato	Township	Montcalm	2,898	2,735	+6.0%	2,920	35.14 sq mi (91.0 km^{2})	77.8/sq mi (30.1/km^{2})
Cedar	Township	Osceola	479	455	+5.3%	406	34.48 sq mi (89.3 km^{2})	13.2/sq mi (5.1/km^{2})
Cedar Creek	Township	Muskegon	3,192	3,186	+0.2%	3,109	34.70 sq mi (89.9 km^{2})	91.8/sq mi (35.5/km^{2})
Cedar Creek	Township	Wexford	1,855	1,757	+5.6%	1,489	34.12 sq mi (88.4 km^{2})	51.5/sq mi (19.9/km^{2})
Cedar Springs	City	Kent	3,627	3,509	+3.4%	3,112	2.03 sq mi (5.3 km^{2})	1,728.6/sq mi (667.4/km^{2})
Cedarville	Township	Menominee	242	253	−4.3%	276	78.94 sq mi (204.5 km^{2})	3.2/sq mi (1.2/km^{2})
Cement City	Village	Jackson; Lenawee	424	438	−3.2%	452	0.90 sq mi (2.3 km^{2})	486.7/sq mi (187.9/km^{2})
Center	Township	Emmet	525	568	−7.6%	499	34.30 sq mi (88.8 km^{2})	16.6/sq mi (6.4/km^{2})
Center Line	City	Macomb	8,552	8,257	+3.6%	8,531	1.74 sq mi (4.5 km^{2})	4,745.4/sq mi (1,832.2/km^{2})
Centerville	Township	Leelanau	1,243	1,274	−2.4%	1,095	27.70 sq mi (71.7 km^{2})	46.0/sq mi (17.8/km^{2})
Central Lake	Village	Antrim	960	952	+0.8%	990	1.07 sq mi (2.8 km^{2})	889.7/sq mi (343.5/km^{2})
Central Lake	Township	Antrim	2,159	2,198	−1.8%	2,254	27.50 sq mi (71.2 km^{2})	79.9/sq mi (30.9/km^{2})
Centreville†	Village	St. Joseph	1,319	1,425	−7.4%	1,579	1.49 sq mi (3.9 km^{2})	956.4/sq mi (369.3/km^{2})
Champion	Township	Marquette	250	297	−15.8%	297	120.89 sq mi (313.1 km^{2})	2.5/sq mi (0.9/km^{2})
Chandler	Township	Charlevoix	284	248	+14.5%	230	35.60 sq mi (92.2 km^{2})	7.0/sq mi (2.7/km^{2})
Chandler	Township	Huron	454	472	−3.8%	501	35.30 sq mi (91.4 km^{2})	13.4/sq mi (5.2/km^{2})
Chapin	Township	Saginaw	928	1,060	−12.5%	1,045	24.65 sq mi (63.8 km^{2})	43.0/sq mi (16.6/km^{2})
Charleston	Township	Kalamazoo	1,904	1,975	−3.6%	1,813	34.78 sq mi (90.1 km^{2})	56.8/sq mi (21.9/km^{2})
Charlevoix†	City	Charlevoix	2,348	2,513	−6.6%	2,994	2.05 sq mi (5.3 km^{2})	1,225.9/sq mi (473.3/km^{2})
Charlevoix	Township	Charlevoix	1,763	1,645	+7.2%	1,697	5.94 sq mi (15.4 km^{2})	276.9/sq mi (106.9/km^{2})
Charlotte†	City	Eaton	9,299	9,074	+2.5%	8,389	6.45 sq mi (16.7 km^{2})	1,406.8/sq mi (543.2/km^{2})
Charlton	Township	Otsego	1,350	1,354	−0.3%	1,330	100.37 sq mi (260.0 km^{2})	13.5/sq mi (5.2/km^{2})
Chase	Township	Lake	1,153	1,137	+1.4%	1,194	35.40 sq mi (91.7 km^{2})	32.1/sq mi (12.4/km^{2})
Chassell	Township	Houghton	1,878	1,812	+3.6%	1,822	48.33 sq mi (125.2 km^{2})	37.5/sq mi (14.5/km^{2})
Chatham	Village	Alger	193	220	−12.3%	231	2.45 sq mi (6.3 km^{2})	89.8/sq mi (34.7/km^{2})
Cheboygan†	City	Cheboygan	4,770	4,867	−2.0%	5,295	6.80 sq mi (17.6 km^{2})	715.7/sq mi (276.3/km^{2})
Chelsea	City	Washtenaw	5,467	4,944	+10.6%	4,398	3.63 sq mi (9.4 km^{2})	1,362.0/sq mi (525.9/km^{2})
Cherry Grove	Township	Wexford	2,421	2,377	+1.9%	2,328	33.37 sq mi (86.4 km^{2})	71.2/sq mi (27.5/km^{2})
Cherry Valley	Township	Lake	422	396	+6.6%	368	35.61 sq mi (92.2 km^{2})	11.1/sq mi (4.3/km^{2})
Chesaning	Village	Saginaw	2,430	2,394	+1.5%	2,548	3.05 sq mi (7.9 km^{2})	784.9/sq mi (303.1/km^{2})
Chesaning	Township	Saginaw	4,748	4,659	+1.9%	4,861	34.27 sq mi (88.8 km^{2})	135.9/sq mi (52.5/km^{2})
Cheshire	Township	Allegan	2,211	2,199	+0.5%	2,335	34.82 sq mi (90.2 km^{2})	63.2/sq mi (24.4/km^{2})
Chester	Township	Eaton	1,769	1,747	+1.3%	1,778	36.03 sq mi (93.3 km^{2})	48.5/sq mi (18.7/km^{2})
Chester	Township	Otsego	1,300	1,292	+0.6%	1,265	67.56 sq mi (175.0 km^{2})	19.1/sq mi (7.4/km^{2})
Chester	Township	Ottawa	2,096	2,017	+3.9%	2,315	35.63 sq mi (92.3 km^{2})	56.6/sq mi (21.9/km^{2})
Chesterfield	Charter township	Macomb	45,376	43,381	+4.6%	37,405	27.58 sq mi (71.4 km^{2})	1,572.9/sq mi (607.3/km^{2})
Chestonia	Township	Antrim	512	511	+0.2%	546	35.27 sq mi (91.3 km^{2})	14.5/sq mi (5.6/km^{2})
Chikaming	Township	Berrien	2,778	3,100	−10.4%	3,678	21.94 sq mi (56.8 km^{2})	141.3/sq mi (54.6/km^{2})
China	Charter township	St. Clair	3,509	3,551	−1.2%	3,340	34.03 sq mi (88.1 km^{2})	104.3/sq mi (40.3/km^{2})
Chippewa	Township	Chippewa	187	213	−12.2%	238	94.84 sq mi (245.6 km^{2})	2.2/sq mi (0.9/km^{2})
Chippewa	Township	Isabella	4,446	4,654	−4.5%	4,617	35.85 sq mi (92.9 km^{2})	129.8/sq mi (50.1/km^{2})
Chippewa	Township	Mecosta	1,227	1,212	+1.2%	1,239	32.98 sq mi (85.4 km^{2})	36.7/sq mi (14.2/km^{2})
Chocolay	Charter township	Marquette	5,899	5,903	−0.1%	7,148	58.98 sq mi (152.8 km^{2})	100.1/sq mi (38.6/km^{2})
Churchill	Township	Ogemaw	1,543	1,713	−9.9%	1,603	35.53 sq mi (92.0 km^{2})	48.2/sq mi (18.6/km^{2})
Clam Lake	Township	Wexford	2,325	2,467	−5.8%	2,238	30.71 sq mi (79.5 km^{2})	80.3/sq mi (31.0/km^{2})
Clam Union	Township	Missaukee	907	882	+2.8%	882	35.59 sq mi (92.2 km^{2})	24.8/sq mi (9.6/km^{2})
Clare	City	Clare; Isabella	3,254	3,118	+4.4%	3,173	3.39 sq mi (8.8 km^{2})	919.8/sq mi (355.1/km^{2})
Clarence	Township	Calhoun	1,903	1,985	−4.1%	2,032	32.55 sq mi (84.3 km^{2})	61.0/sq mi (23.5/km^{2})
Clarendon	Township	Calhoun	1,181	1,139	+3.7%	1,114	35.54 sq mi (92.0 km^{2})	32.0/sq mi (12.4/km^{2})
Clark	Township	Mackinac	1,917	2,056	−6.8%	2,200	78.97 sq mi (204.5 km^{2})	26.0/sq mi (10.1/km^{2})
Clarksville	Village	Ionia	411	394	+4.3%	317	0.50 sq mi (1.3 km^{2})	788.0/sq mi (304.2/km^{2})
Clawson	City	Oakland	11,389	11,825	−3.7%	12,732	2.20 sq mi (5.7 km^{2})	5,375.0/sq mi (2,075.3/km^{2})
Clay	Township	St. Clair	8,446	9,066	−6.8%	9,822	35.32 sq mi (91.5 km^{2})	256.7/sq mi (99.1/km^{2})
Claybanks	Township	Oceana	855	777	+10.0%	831	23.49 sq mi (60.8 km^{2})	33.1/sq mi (12.8/km^{2})
Clayton	Township	Arenac	1,001	1,097	−8.8%	1,101	32.07 sq mi (83.1 km^{2})	34.2/sq mi (13.2/km^{2})
Clayton	Charter township	Genesee	7,460	7,581	−1.6%	7,546	34.16 sq mi (88.5 km^{2})	221.9/sq mi (85.7/km^{2})
Clayton	Village	Lenawee	311	344	−9.6%	326	0.71 sq mi (1.8 km^{2})	484.5/sq mi (187.1/km^{2})
Clearwater	Township	Kalkaska	2,497	2,444	+2.2%	2,382	31.17 sq mi (80.7 km^{2})	78.4/sq mi (30.3/km^{2})
Clement	Township	Gladwin	892	901	−1.0%	994	20.04 sq mi (51.9 km^{2})	45.0/sq mi (17.4/km^{2})
Cleon	Township	Manistee	1,063	957	+11.1%	932	36.07 sq mi (93.4 km^{2})	26.5/sq mi (10.2/km^{2})
Cleveland	Township	Leelanau	1,103	1,031	+7.0%	1,040	30.69 sq mi (79.5 km^{2})	33.6/sq mi (13.0/km^{2})
Clifford	Village	Lapeer	300	324	−7.4%	324	1.51 sq mi (3.9 km^{2})	214.6/sq mi (82.8/km^{2})
Climax	Village	Kalamazoo	712	767	−7.2%	791	1.06 sq mi (2.7 km^{2})	723.6/sq mi (279.4/km^{2})
Climax	Township	Kalamazoo	2,364	2,463	−4.0%	2,412	36.14 sq mi (93.6 km^{2})	68.2/sq mi (26.3/km^{2})
Clinton	Village	Lenawee	2,517	2,336	+7.7%	2,293	1.84 sq mi (4.8 km^{2})	1,269.6/sq mi (490.2/km^{2})
Clinton	Township	Lenawee	3,765	3,604	+4.5%	3,624	18.13 sq mi (47.0 km^{2})	198.8/sq mi (76.8/km^{2})
Clinton	Charter township	Macomb	100,513	96,796	+3.8%	95,648	28.1 sq mi (73 km^{2})	3,444.7/sq mi (1,330.0/km^{2})
Clinton	Township	Oscoda	431	441	−2.3%	511	70.5 sq mi (183 km^{2})	6.3/sq mi (2.4/km^{2})
Clio	City	Genesee	2,525	2,646	−4.6%	2,483	1.11 sq mi (2.9 km^{2})	2,383.8/sq mi (920.4/km^{2})
Clyde	Township	Allegan	2,060	2,084	−1.2%	2,104	34.8 sq mi (90 km^{2})	59.9/sq mi (23.1/km^{2})
Clyde	Township	St. Clair	5,523	5,579	−1.0%	5,523	35.65 sq mi (92.3 km^{2})	156.5/sq mi (60.4/km^{2})
Coe	Township	Isabella	3,032	3,079	−1.5%	2,993	36.17 sq mi (93.7 km^{2})	85.1/sq mi (32.9/km^{2})
Cohoctah	Township	Livingston	3,246	3,317	−2.1%	3,394	37.92 sq mi (98.2 km^{2})	87.5/sq mi (33.8/km^{2})
Coldsprings	Township	Kalkaska	1,551	1,464	+5.9%	1,449	34.51 sq mi (89.4 km^{2})	42.4/sq mi (16.4/km^{2})
Coldwater†	City	Branch	13,822	10,945	+26.3%	12,697	8.03 sq mi (20.8 km^{2})	1,363.0/sq mi (526.3/km^{2})
Coldwater	Township	Branch	3,406	6,102	−44.2%	3,678	27.54 sq mi (71.3 km^{2})	221.6/sq mi (85.5/km^{2})
Coldwater	Township	Isabella	801	777	+3.1%	737	35.92 sq mi (93.0 km^{2})	21.6/sq mi (8.4/km^{2})
Coleman	City	Midland	1,262	1,243	+1.5%	1,296	1.26 sq mi (3.3 km^{2})	986.5/sq mi (380.9/km^{2})
Colfax	Township	Benzie	677	657	+3.0%	585	35.65 sq mi (92.3 km^{2})	18.4/sq mi (7.1/km^{2})
Colfax	Township	Huron	1,753	1,884	−7.0%	1,954	34.55 sq mi (89.5 km^{2})	54.5/sq mi (21.1/km^{2})
Colfax	Township	Mecosta	1,962	1,933	+1.5%	1,975	35.11 sq mi (90.9 km^{2})	55.1/sq mi (21.3/km^{2})
Colfax	Township	Oceana	446	462	−3.5%	574	32.71 sq mi (84.7 km^{2})	14.1/sq mi (5.5/km^{2})
Colfax	Township	Wexford	897	840	+6.8%	763	35.26 sq mi (91.3 km^{2})	23.8/sq mi (9.2/km^{2})
Coloma	City	Berrien	1,465	1,483	−1.2%	1,595	0.89 sq mi (2.3 km^{2})	1,666.3/sq mi (643.4/km^{2})
Coloma	Charter township	Berrien	5,051	5,020	+0.6%	5,217	17.97 sq mi (46.5 km^{2})	279.4/sq mi (107.9/km^{2})
Colon	Village	St. Joseph	1,199	1,173	+2.2%	1,227	1.37 sq mi (3.5 km^{2})	856.2/sq mi (330.6/km^{2})
Colon	Township	St. Joseph	3,325	3,329	−0.1%	3,405	34.36 sq mi (89.0 km^{2})	96.9/sq mi (37.4/km^{2})
Columbia	Township	Jackson	7,392	7,420	−0.4%	7,234	36.64 sq mi (94.9 km^{2})	202.5/sq mi (78.2/km^{2})
Columbia	Township	Tuscola	1,229	1,284	−4.3%	1,419	35.98 sq mi (93.2 km^{2})	35.7/sq mi (13.8/km^{2})
Columbia	Township	Van Buren	2,546	2,588	−1.6%	2,714	33.91 sq mi (87.8 km^{2})	76.3/sq mi (29.5/km^{2})
Columbiaville	Village	Lapeer	702	787	−10.8%	815	0.85 sq mi (2.2 km^{2})	925.9/sq mi (357.5/km^{2})
Columbus	Township	Luce	169	204	−17.2%	215	140.34 sq mi (363.5 km^{2})	1.5/sq mi (0.6/km^{2})
Columbus	Township	St. Clair	4,112	4,070	+1.0%	4,615	36.64 sq mi (94.9 km^{2})	111.1/sq mi (42.9/km^{2})
Comins	Township	Oscoda	1,839	1,970	−6.6%	2,017	70.56 sq mi (182.7 km^{2})	27.9/sq mi (10.8/km^{2})
Commerce	Charter township	Oakland	43,058	40,186	+7.1%	34,764	27.45 sq mi (71.1 km^{2})	1,464.0/sq mi (565.2/km^{2})
Comstock	Charter township	Kalamazoo	15,231	14,854	+2.5%	13,851	33.31 sq mi (86.3 km^{2})	445.9/sq mi (172.2/km^{2})
Concord	Village	Jackson	1,085	1,050	+3.3%	1,101	1.5 sq mi (3.9 km^{2})	700.0/sq mi (270.3/km^{2})
Concord	Township	Jackson	2,755	2,723	+1.2%	2,692	35.73 sq mi (92.5 km^{2})	76.2/sq mi (29.4/km^{2})
Constantine	Village	St. Joseph	1,947	2,076	−6.2%	2,095	1.61 sq mi (4.2 km^{2})	1,289.4/sq mi (497.9/km^{2})
Constantine	Township	St. Joseph	4,037	4,217	−4.3%	4,181	34.47 sq mi (89.3 km^{2})	122.3/sq mi (47.2/km^{2})
Convis	Township	Calhoun	1,508	1,636	−7.8%	1,666	35.37 sq mi (91.6 km^{2})	46.3/sq mi (17.9/km^{2})
Conway	Township	Livingston	3,608	3,546	+1.7%	2,732	37.73 sq mi (97.7 km^{2})	94.0/sq mi (36.3/km^{2})
Cooper	Charter township	Kalamazoo	10,418	10,111	+3.0%	8,754	36.33 sq mi (94.1 km^{2})	278.3/sq mi (107.5/km^{2})
Coopersville	City	Ottawa	4,828	4,275	+12.9%	3,910	4.81 sq mi (12.5 km^{2})	888.8/sq mi (343.2/km^{2})
Copemish	Village	Manistee	195	194	+0.5%	232	0.93 sq mi (2.4 km^{2})	208.6/sq mi (80.5/km^{2})
Copper City	Village	Houghton	187	190	−1.6%	205	0.08 sq mi (0.21 km^{2})	2,375.0/sq mi (917.0/km^{2})
Cornell	Township	Delta	565	593	−4.7%	557	59.73 sq mi (154.7 km^{2})	9.9/sq mi (3.8/km^{2})
Corunna†	City	Shiawassee	3,046	3,497	−12.9%	3,381	3.19 sq mi (8.3 km^{2})	1,096.2/sq mi (423.3/km^{2})
Corwith	Township	Otsego	1,708	1,748	−2.3%	1,719	107.48 sq mi (278.4 km^{2})	16.3/sq mi (6.3/km^{2})
Cottrellville	Township	St. Clair	3,406	3,559	−4.3%	3,814	20.86 sq mi (54.0 km^{2})	170.6/sq mi (65.9/km^{2})
Courtland	Township	Kent	9,005	7,678	+17.3%	5,817	34.7 sq mi (90 km^{2})	221.3/sq mi (85.4/km^{2})
Covert	Township	Van Buren	2,510	2,888	−13.1%	3,141	34.92 sq mi (90.4 km^{2})	82.7/sq mi (31.9/km^{2})
Covington	Township	Baraga	375	476	−21.2%	569	192.26 sq mi (498.0 km^{2})	2.5/sq mi (1.0/km^{2})
Crockery	Township	Ottawa	4,572	3,960	+15.5%	3,782	32.45 sq mi (84.0 km^{2})	122.0/sq mi (47.1/km^{2})
Cross Village	Township	Emmet	240	281	−14.6%	294	10.1 sq mi (26 km^{2})	27.8/sq mi (10.7/km^{2})
Croswell	City	Sanilac	2,322	2,447	−5.1%	2,467	2.29 sq mi (5.9 km^{2})	1,068.6/sq mi (412.6/km^{2})
Croton	Township	Newaygo	3,368	3,228	+4.3%	3,042	33.7 sq mi (87 km^{2})	95.8/sq mi (37.0/km^{2})
Crystal	Township	Montcalm	2,619	2,689	−2.6%	2,824	34 sq mi (88 km^{2})	79.1/sq mi (30.5/km^{2})
Crystal	Township	Oceana	681	838	−18.7%	832	34.7 sq mi (90 km^{2})	24.1/sq mi (9.3/km^{2})
Crystal Falls†	City	Iron	1,598	1,469	+8.8%	1,791	3.47 sq mi (9.0 km^{2})	423.3/sq mi (163.5/km^{2})
Crystal Falls	Township	Iron	1,647	1,743	−5.5%	1,722	228.41 sq mi (591.6 km^{2})	7.6/sq mi (2.9/km^{2})
Crystal Lake	Township	Benzie	1,065	957	+11.3%	960	12.56 sq mi (32.5 km^{2})	76.2/sq mi (29.4/km^{2})
Cumming	Township	Ogemaw	717	698	+2.7%	796	34.49 sq mi (89.3 km^{2})	20.2/sq mi (7.8/km^{2})
Curtis	Township	Alcona	1,087	1,236	−12.1%	1,378	68.39 sq mi (177.1 km^{2})	18.1/sq mi (7.0/km^{2})
Custer	Township	Antrim	1,150	1,136	+1.2%	988	34.71 sq mi (89.9 km^{2})	32.7/sq mi (12.6/km^{2})
Custer	Village	Mason	272	284	−4.2%	318	0.98 sq mi (2.5 km^{2})	289.8/sq mi (111.9/km^{2})
Custer	Township	Mason	1,321	1,254	+5.3%	1,307	34.88 sq mi (90.3 km^{2})	36.0/sq mi (13.9/km^{2})
Custer	Township	Sanilac	893	1,006	−11.2%	1,036	35.33 sq mi (91.5 km^{2})	28.5/sq mi (11.0/km^{2})
Dafter	Township	Chippewa	1,327	1,263	+5.1%	1,304	47.8 sq mi (124 km^{2})	26.4/sq mi (10.2/km^{2})
Daggett	Village	Menominee	201	258	−22.1%	270	1.1 sq mi (2.8 km^{2})	234.5/sq mi (90.6/km^{2})
Daggett	Township	Menominee	614	714	−14.0%	740	35.94 sq mi (93.1 km^{2})	19.9/sq mi (7.7/km^{2})
Dallas	Township	Clinton	2,411	2,369	+1.8%	2,323	36.39 sq mi (94.2 km^{2})	65.1/sq mi (25.1/km^{2})
Dalton	Township	Muskegon	9,427	9,300	+1.4%	8,047	35.26 sq mi (91.3 km^{2})	263.8/sq mi (101.8/km^{2})
Danby	Township	Ionia	2,953	2,988	−1.2%	2,696	35.11 sq mi (90.9 km^{2})	85.1/sq mi (32.9/km^{2})
Dansville	Village	Ingham	529	563	−6.0%	429	1.01 sq mi (2.6 km^{2})	557.4/sq mi (215.2/km^{2})
Davison	City	Genesee	5,143	5,173	−0.6%	5,536	1.98 sq mi (5.1 km^{2})	2,612.6/sq mi (1,008.7/km^{2})
Davison	Township	Genesee	20,434	19,575	+4.4%	17,722	33.32 sq mi (86.3 km^{2})	587.5/sq mi (226.8/km^{2})
Day	Township	Montcalm	1,141	1,172	−2.6%	1,282	35.27 sq mi (91.3 km^{2})	33.2/sq mi (12.8/km^{2})
Dayton	Township	Newaygo	1,994	1,949	+2.3%	2,002	32.91 sq mi (85.2 km^{2})	59.2/sq mi (22.9/km^{2})
Dayton	Township	Tuscola	1,920	1,848	+3.9%	1,869	35.6 sq mi (92 km^{2})	51.9/sq mi (20.0/km^{2})
Dearborn	City	Wayne	109,976	98,153	+12.0%	97,775	24.22 sq mi (62.7 km^{2})	4,052.6/sq mi (1,564.7/km^{2})
Dearborn Heights	City	Wayne	63,292	57,774	+9.6%	58,264	11.74 sq mi (30.4 km^{2})	4,921.1/sq mi (1,900.1/km^{2})
Decatur	Village	Van Buren	1,651	1,819	−9.2%	1,838	1.35 sq mi (3.5 km^{2})	1,347.4/sq mi (520.2/km^{2})
Decatur	Township	Van Buren	3,575	3,726	−4.1%	3,916	34.88 sq mi (90.3 km^{2})	106.8/sq mi (41.2/km^{2})
Deckerville	Village	Sanilac	877	830	+5.7%	944	1.25 sq mi (3.2 km^{2})	664.0/sq mi (256.4/km^{2})
Deep River	Township	Arenac	2,050	2,149	−4.6%	2,244	35.28 sq mi (91.4 km^{2})	60.9/sq mi (23.5/km^{2})
Deerfield	Township	Isabella	3,257	3,188	+2.2%	3,081	35.45 sq mi (91.8 km^{2})	89.9/sq mi (34.7/km^{2})
Deerfield	Township	Lapeer	5,764	5,695	+1.2%	5,736	35.41 sq mi (91.7 km^{2})	160.8/sq mi (62.1/km^{2})
Deerfield	Village	Lenawee	901	898	+0.3%	1,005	0.96 sq mi (2.5 km^{2})	935.4/sq mi (361.2/km^{2})
Deerfield	Township	Lenawee	1,503	1,568	−4.1%	1,770	25.01 sq mi (64.8 km^{2})	62.7/sq mi (24.2/km^{2})
Deerfield	Township	Livingston	4,166	4,170	−0.1%	4,087	36.17 sq mi (93.7 km^{2})	115.3/sq mi (44.5/km^{2})
Deerfield	Township	Mecosta	1,785	1,816	−1.7%	1,630	35.67 sq mi (92.4 km^{2})	50.9/sq mi (19.7/km^{2})
Delaware	Township	Sanilac	784	856	−8.4%	930	46.44 sq mi (120.3 km^{2})	18.4/sq mi (7.1/km^{2})
Delhi	Charter township	Ingham	27,710	25,877	+7.1%	22,569	28.61 sq mi (74.1 km^{2})	904.5/sq mi (349.2/km^{2})
Delta	Charter township	Eaton	33,119	32,408	+2.2%	29,682	32.46 sq mi (84.1 km^{2})	998.4/sq mi (385.5/km^{2})
Denmark	Township	Tuscola	2,741	3,068	−10.7%	3,249	35.27 sq mi (91.3 km^{2})	87.0/sq mi (33.6/km^{2})
Denton	Township	Roscommon	5,293	5,557	−4.8%	5,817	26.24 sq mi (68.0 km^{2})	211.8/sq mi (81.8/km^{2})
Denver	Township	Isabella	1,199	1,148	+4.4%	1,147	36.41 sq mi (94.3 km^{2})	31.5/sq mi (12.2/km^{2})
Denver	Township	Newaygo	2,008	1,928	+4.1%	1,971	33.94 sq mi (87.9 km^{2})	56.8/sq mi (21.9/km^{2})
Detour	Township	Chippewa	671	807	−16.9%	894	48.77 sq mi (126.3 km^{2})	16.5/sq mi (6.4/km^{2})
DeTour Village	Village	Chippewa	263	325	−19.1%	421	3.54 sq mi (9.2 km^{2})	91.8/sq mi (35.4/km^{2})
Detroit†	City	Wayne	639,111	713,777	−10.5%	951,270	138.75 sq mi (359.4 km^{2})	5,144.3/sq mi (1,986.2/km^{2})
DeWitt	City	Clinton	4,776	4,507	+6.0%	4,702	2.86 sq mi (7.4 km^{2})	1,575.9/sq mi (608.4/km^{2})
DeWitt	Charter township	Clinton	15,073	14,321	+5.3%	12,143	31.03 sq mi (80.4 km^{2})	461.5/sq mi (178.2/km^{2})
Dexter	City	Washtenaw	4,500	4,067	+10.6%	2,338	1.87 sq mi (4.8 km^{2})	2,174.9/sq mi (839.7/km^{2})
Dexter	Township	Washtenaw	6,696	6,042	+10.8%	5,248	30.36 sq mi (78.6 km^{2})	199.0/sq mi (76.8/km^{2})
Dickson	Township	Manistee	980	993	−1.3%	929	69.53 sq mi (180.1 km^{2})	14.3/sq mi (5.5/km^{2})
Dimondale	Village	Eaton	1,134	1,234	−8.1%	1,342	0.90 sq mi (2.3 km^{2})	1,371.1/sq mi (529.4/km^{2})
Dorr	Township	Allegan	7,922	7,439	+6.5%	6,579	36.15 sq mi (93.6 km^{2})	205.8/sq mi (79.5/km^{2})
Douglas	City	Allegan	1,378	1,232	+11.9%	1,214	1.75 sq mi (4.5 km^{2})	704.0/sq mi (271.8/km^{2})
Douglass	Township	Montcalm	2,239	2,180	+2.7%	2,377	34.74 sq mi (90.0 km^{2})	62.8/sq mi (24.2/km^{2})
Dover	Township	Lake	383	395	−3.0%	332	36.86 sq mi (95.5 km^{2})	10.7/sq mi (4.1/km^{2})
Dover	Township	Lenawee	1,662	1,834	−9.4%	1,787	35.08 sq mi (90.9 km^{2})	52.3/sq mi (20.2/km^{2})
Dover	Township	Otsego	632	561	+12.7%	614	35.17 sq mi (91.1 km^{2})	16.0/sq mi (6.2/km^{2})
Dowagiac	City	Cass	5,721	5,879	−2.7%	6,147	4.46 sq mi (11.6 km^{2})	1,318.2/sq mi (508.9/km^{2})
Doyle	Township	Schoolcraft	563	624	−9.8%	630	146.12 sq mi (378.4 km^{2})	4.3/sq mi (1.6/km^{2})
Drummond	Township	Chippewa	973	1,058	−8.0%	992	128.91 sq mi (333.9 km^{2})	8.2/sq mi (3.2/km^{2})
Dryden	Village	Lapeer	1,023	951	+7.6%	815	1.10 sq mi (2.8 km^{2})	864.5/sq mi (333.8/km^{2})
Dryden	Township	Lapeer	4,799	4,768	+0.7%	4,624	34.94 sq mi (90.5 km^{2})	136.5/sq mi (52.7/km^{2})
Duncan	Township	Houghton	234	236	−0.8%	280	176.11 sq mi (456.1 km^{2})	1.3/sq mi (0.5/km^{2})
Dundee	Village	Monroe	5,323	3,957	+34.5%	3,522	6.04 sq mi (15.6 km^{2})	655.1/sq mi (252.9/km^{2})
Dundee	Township	Monroe	8,145	6,759	+20.5%	6,341	48.22 sq mi (124.9 km^{2})	140.2/sq mi (54.1/km^{2})
Duplain	Township	Clinton	2,303	2,363	−2.5%	2,329	35.12 sq mi (91.0 km^{2})	67.3/sq mi (26.0/km^{2})
Durand	City	Shiawassee	3,507	3,446	+1.8%	3,933	2.10 sq mi (5.4 km^{2})	1,641.0/sq mi (633.6/km^{2})
Dwight	Township	Huron	708	758	−6.6%	930	35.73 sq mi (92.5 km^{2})	21.2/sq mi (8.2/km^{2})
Eagle	Village	Clinton	122	123	−0.8%	130	0.12 sq mi (0.31 km^{2})	1,025.0/sq mi (395.8/km^{2})
Eagle	Township	Clinton	2,776	2,671	+3.9%	2,332	34.74 sq mi (90.0 km^{2})	76.9/sq mi (29.7/km^{2})
Eagle Harbor	Township	Keweenaw	217	217	0.0%	281	180.41 sq mi (467.3 km^{2})	1.2/sq mi (0.5/km^{2})
East Bay	Charter township	Grand Traverse	11,589	10,663	+8.7%	9,919	39.93 sq mi (103.4 km^{2})	267.0/sq mi (103.1/km^{2})
East China	Charter township	St. Clair	3,704	3,788	−2.2%	3,630	6.58 sq mi (17.0 km^{2})	575.7/sq mi (222.3/km^{2})
East Grand Rapids	City	Kent	11,371	10,694	+6.3%	10,764	2.93 sq mi (7.6 km^{2})	3,649.8/sq mi (1,409.2/km^{2})
East Jordan	City	Charlevoix	2,239	2,351	−4.8%	2,507	3.05 sq mi (7.9 km^{2})	770.8/sq mi (297.6/km^{2})
Eastlake	Village	Manistee	415	512	−18.9%	441	1.16 sq mi (3.0 km^{2})	441.4/sq mi (170.4/km^{2})
East Lansing	City	Ingham, Clinton	47,741	48,579	−1.7%	46,525	13.59 sq mi (35.2 km^{2})	3,574.6/sq mi (1,380.2/km^{2})
Easton	Township	Ionia	3,058	3,082	−0.8%	2,835	28.42 sq mi (73.6 km^{2})	108.4/sq mi (41.9/km^{2})
Eastpointe	City	Macomb	34,318	32,442	+5.8%	34,077	5.14 sq mi (13.3 km^{2})	6,311.7/sq mi (2,437.0/km^{2})
East Tawas	City	Iosco	2,663	2,808	−5.2%	2,951	2.84 sq mi (7.4 km^{2})	988.7/sq mi (381.8/km^{2})
Eaton	Township	Eaton	4,007	4,073	−1.6%	4,278	32.02 sq mi (82.9 km^{2})	127.2/sq mi (49.1/km^{2})
Eaton Rapids	City	Eaton	5,203	5,214	−0.2%	5,330	3.39 sq mi (8.8 km^{2})	1,538.1/sq mi (593.8/km^{2})
Eaton Rapids	Township	Eaton	3,991	4,113	−3.0%	3,821	34.15 sq mi (88.4 km^{2})	120.4/sq mi (46.5/km^{2})
Eau Claire	Village	Berrien	552	625	−11.7%	656	0.74 sq mi (1.9 km^{2})	844.6/sq mi (326.1/km^{2})
Echo	Township	Antrim	952	877	+8.6%	928	34.85 sq mi (90.3 km^{2})	25.2/sq mi (9.7/km^{2})
Eckford	Township	Calhoun	1,298	1,303	−0.4%	1,282	35.4 sq mi (92 km^{2})	36.8/sq mi (14.2/km^{2})
Ecorse	City	Wayne	9,305	9,512	−2.2%	11,229	2.8 sq mi (7.3 km^{2})	3,397.1/sq mi (1,311.6/km^{2})
Eden	Township	Lake	469	487	−3.7%	377	36.44 sq mi (94.4 km^{2})	13.4/sq mi (5.2/km^{2})
Eden	Township	Mason	580	582	−0.3%	555	35.41 sq mi (91.7 km^{2})	16.4/sq mi (6.3/km^{2})
Edenville	Township	Midland	2,493	2,551	−2.3%	2,528	34.8 sq mi (90 km^{2})	73.3/sq mi (28.3/km^{2})
Edmore	Village	Montcalm	1,210	1,201	+0.7%	1,244	1.51 sq mi (3.9 km^{2})	795.4/sq mi (307.1/km^{2})
Edwards	Township	Ogemaw	1,361	1,413	−3.7%	1,390	34.93 sq mi (90.5 km^{2})	40.5/sq mi (15.6/km^{2})
Edwardsburg	Village	Cass	1,304	1,259	+3.6%	1,147	0.91 sq mi (2.4 km^{2})	1,383.5/sq mi (534.2/km^{2})
Egelston	Township	Muskegon	11,128	9,909	+12.3%	9,537	31.95 sq mi (82.8 km^{2})	310.1/sq mi (119.7/km^{2})
Elba	Township	Gratiot	1,293	1,396	−7.4%	1,394	34.99 sq mi (90.6 km^{2})	39.9/sq mi (15.4/km^{2})
Elba	Township	Lapeer	5,235	5,250	−0.3%	5,462	31.61 sq mi (81.9 km^{2})	166.1/sq mi (64.1/km^{2})
Elberta	Village	Benzie	329	372	−11.6%	457	0.74 sq mi (1.9 km^{2})	502.7/sq mi (194.1/km^{2})
Elbridge	Township	Oceana	999	971	+2.9%	1,233	33.83 sq mi (87.6 km^{2})	28.7/sq mi (11.1/km^{2})
Elk	Township	Lake	940	985	−4.6%	900	35.51 sq mi (92.0 km^{2})	27.7/sq mi (10.7/km^{2})
Elk	Township	Sanilac	1,522	1,526	−0.3%	1,584	35.67 sq mi (92.4 km^{2})	42.8/sq mi (16.5/km^{2})
Elkland	Township	Tuscola	3,532	3,528	+0.1%	3,659	35 sq mi (91 km^{2})	100.8/sq mi (38.9/km^{2})
Elk Rapids	Village	Antrim	1,529	1,642	−6.9%	1,700	1.65 sq mi (4.3 km^{2})	995.2/sq mi (384.2/km^{2})
Elk Rapids	Township	Antrim	2,521	2,631	−4.2%	2,741	7.08 sq mi (18.3 km^{2})	371.6/sq mi (143.5/km^{2})
Elkton	Village	Huron	796	808	−1.5%	863	1 sq mi (2.6 km^{2})	808.0/sq mi (312.0/km^{2})
Ellington	Township	Tuscola	1,325	1,332	−0.5%	1,304	35.44 sq mi (91.8 km^{2})	37.6/sq mi (14.5/km^{2})
Ellis	Township	Cheboygan	557	596	−6.5%	519	35.57 sq mi (92.1 km^{2})	16.8/sq mi (6.5/km^{2})
Ellsworth	Village	Antrim	367	349	+5.2%	483	0.72 sq mi (1.9 km^{2})	484.7/sq mi (187.2/km^{2})
Ellsworth	Township	Lake	736	817	−9.9%	821	35.16 sq mi (91.1 km^{2})	23.2/sq mi (9.0/km^{2})
Elmer	Township	Oscoda	1,150	1,138	+1.1%	1,095	70.95 sq mi (183.8 km^{2})	16.0/sq mi (6.2/km^{2})
Elmer	Township	Sanilac	724	806	−10.2%	790	36.33 sq mi (94.1 km^{2})	22.2/sq mi (8.6/km^{2})
Elmira	Township	Otsego	1,714	1,687	+1.6%	1,598	35.84 sq mi (92.8 km^{2})	47.1/sq mi (18.2/km^{2})
Elm River	Township	Houghton	204	177	+15.3%	169	91.26 sq mi (236.4 km^{2})	1.9/sq mi (0.7/km^{2})
Elmwood	Charter township	Leelanau	4,892	4,503	+8.6%	4,264	19.94 sq mi (51.6 km^{2})	225.8/sq mi (87.2/km^{2})
Elmwood	Township	Tuscola	1,060	1,207	−12.2%	1,213	35.4 sq mi (92 km^{2})	34.1/sq mi (13.2/km^{2})
Elsie	Village	Clinton	930	966	−3.7%	1,055	1.16 sq mi (3.0 km^{2})	832.8/sq mi (321.5/km^{2})
Ely	Township	Marquette	1,900	1,952	−2.7%	2,010	137.27 sq mi (355.5 km^{2})	14.2/sq mi (5.5/km^{2})
Emerson	Township	Gratiot	849	952	−10.8%	966	34.29 sq mi (88.8 km^{2})	27.8/sq mi (10.7/km^{2})
Emmett	Charter township	Calhoun	11,744	11,770	−0.2%	11,979	32 sq mi (83 km^{2})	367.8/sq mi (142.0/km^{2})
Emmett	Village	St. Clair	258	269	−4.1%	251	1.51 sq mi (3.9 km^{2})	178.1/sq mi (68.8/km^{2})
Emmett	Township	St. Clair	2,515	2,654	−5.2%	2,506	35.34 sq mi (91.5 km^{2})	75.1/sq mi (29.0/km^{2})
Empire	Village	Leelanau	362	375	−3.5%	378	1.15 sq mi (3.0 km^{2})	326.1/sq mi (125.9/km^{2})
Empire	Township	Leelanau	1,126	1,182	−4.7%	1,085	35.24 sq mi (91.3 km^{2})	33.5/sq mi (13.0/km^{2})
Ensign	Township	Delta	746	748	−0.3%	780	58.96 sq mi (152.7 km^{2})	12.7/sq mi (4.9/km^{2})
Ensley	Township	Newaygo	2,603	2,635	−1.2%	2,474	35.41 sq mi (91.7 km^{2})	74.4/sq mi (28.7/km^{2})
Enterprise	Township	Missaukee	174	194	−10.3%	194	34.47 sq mi (89.3 km^{2})	5.6/sq mi (2.2/km^{2})
Erie	Township	Monroe	4,299	4,517	−4.8%	4,850	23.72 sq mi (61.4 km^{2})	190.4/sq mi (73.5/km^{2})
Erwin	Township	Gogebic	267	326	−18.1%	357	47.45 sq mi (122.9 km^{2})	6.9/sq mi (2.7/km^{2})
Escanaba†	City	Delta	12,450	12,616	−1.3%	13,140	12.88 sq mi (33.4 km^{2})	979.5/sq mi (378.2/km^{2})
Escanaba	Township	Delta	3,496	3,482	+0.4%	3,587	59.65 sq mi (154.5 km^{2})	58.4/sq mi (22.5/km^{2})
Essex	Township	Clinton	1,827	1,910	−4.3%	1,812	35.36 sq mi (91.6 km^{2})	54.0/sq mi (20.9/km^{2})
Essexville	City	Bay	3,379	3,478	−2.8%	3,766	1.30 sq mi (3.4 km^{2})	2,675.4/sq mi (1,033.0/km^{2})
Estral Beach	Village	Monroe	403	418	−3.6%	486	0.46 sq mi (1.2 km^{2})	908.7/sq mi (350.8/km^{2})
Eureka	Charter township	Montcalm	4,211	3,959	+6.4%	3,271	28.73 sq mi (74.4 km^{2})	137.8/sq mi (53.2/km^{2})
Evangeline	Township	Charlevoix	767	712	+7.7%	773	11.02 sq mi (28.5 km^{2})	64.6/sq mi (24.9/km^{2})
Evart	City	Osceola	1,742	1,903	−8.5%	1,738	2.24 sq mi (5.8 km^{2})	849.6/sq mi (328.0/km^{2})
Evart	Township	Osceola	1,345	1,483	−9.3%	1,513	32.80 sq mi (85.0 km^{2})	45.2/sq mi (17.5/km^{2})
Eveline	Township	Charlevoix	1,515	1,484	+2.1%	1,560	25.81 sq mi (66.8 km^{2})	57.5/sq mi (22.2/km^{2})
Everett	Township	Newaygo	1,978	1,862	+6.2%	1,985	35.24 sq mi (91.3 km^{2})	52.8/sq mi (20.4/km^{2})
Evergreen	Township	Montcalm	2,941	2,858	+2.9%	2,922	34.65 sq mi (89.7 km^{2})	82.5/sq mi (31.8/km^{2})
Evergreen	Township	Sanilac	961	924	+4.0%	995	35.35 sq mi (91.6 km^{2})	26.1/sq mi (10.1/km^{2})
Ewing	Township	Marquette	150	160	−6.2%	159	48.29 sq mi (125.1 km^{2})	3.3/sq mi (1.3/km^{2})
Excelsior	Township	Kalkaska	991	953	+4.0%	855	35.33 sq mi (91.5 km^{2})	27.0/sq mi (10.4/km^{2})
Exeter	Township	Monroe	3,927	3,968	−1.0%	3,727	36.53 sq mi (94.6 km^{2})	108.6/sq mi (41.9/km^{2})
Fabius	Township	St. Joseph	3,311	3,248	+1.9%	3,285	32.03 sq mi (83.0 km^{2})	101.4/sq mi (39.2/km^{2})
Fairbanks	Township	Delta	297	281	+5.7%	321	47.34 sq mi (122.6 km^{2})	5.9/sq mi (2.3/km^{2})
Fairfield	Township	Lenawee	1,661	1,764	−5.8%	1,756	42.03 sq mi (108.9 km^{2})	42.0/sq mi (16.2/km^{2})
Fairfield	Township	Shiawassee	652	755	−13.6%	745	25.06 sq mi (64.9 km^{2})	30.1/sq mi (11.6/km^{2})
Fairgrove	Village	Tuscola	514	563	−8.7%	627	1.12 sq mi (2.9 km^{2})	502.7/sq mi (194.1/km^{2})
Fairgrove	Township	Tuscola	1,549	1,579	−1.9%	1,749	35.27 sq mi (91.3 km^{2})	44.8/sq mi (17.3/km^{2})
Fairhaven	Township	Huron	1,081	1,107	−2.3%	1,259	21.50 sq mi (55.7 km^{2})	51.5/sq mi (19.9/km^{2})
Fairplain	Township	Montcalm	1,802	1,836	−1.9%	1,826	35.22 sq mi (91.2 km^{2})	52.1/sq mi (20.1/km^{2})
Faithorn	Township	Menominee	239	243	−1.6%	214	53.71 sq mi (139.1 km^{2})	4.5/sq mi (1.7/km^{2})
Farmington	City	Oakland	11,597	10,372	+11.8%	10,423	2.66 sq mi (6.9 km^{2})	3,899.2/sq mi (1,505.5/km^{2})
Farmington Hills	City	Oakland	83,986	79,740	+5.3%	82,111	33.28 sq mi (86.2 km^{2})	2,396.0/sq mi (925.1/km^{2})
Farwell	Village	Clare	880	871	+1.0%	855	1.35 sq mi (3.5 km^{2})	645.2/sq mi (249.1/km^{2})
Fawn River	Township	St. Joseph	1,587	1,477	+7.4%	1,648	19.18 sq mi (49.7 km^{2})	77.0/sq mi (29.7/km^{2})
Fayette	Township	Hillsdale	1,113	3,326	−66.5%	3,350	22.83 sq mi (59.1 km^{2})	145.7/sq mi (56.2/km^{2})
Felch	Township	Dickinson	687	752	−8.6%	726	141.84 sq mi (367.4 km^{2})	5.3/sq mi (2.0/km^{2})
Fennville	City	Allegan	1,745	1,398	+24.8%	1,459	1.10 sq mi (2.8 km^{2})	1,270.9/sq mi (490.7/km^{2})
Fenton	City	Genesee, Livingston, Oakland	12,050	11,756	+2.5%	10,582	6.68 sq mi (17.3 km^{2})	1,759.9/sq mi (679.5/km^{2})
Fenton	Charter township	Genesee	16,843	15,552	+8.3%	12,968	23.8 sq mi (62 km^{2})	653.4/sq mi (252.3/km^{2})
Ferndale	City	Oakland	19,190	19,900	−3.6%	22,105	3.88 sq mi (10.0 km^{2})	5,128.9/sq mi (1,980.3/km^{2})
Ferris	Township	Montcalm	1,331	1,422	−6.4%	1,379	36.03 sq mi (93.3 km^{2})	39.5/sq mi (15.2/km^{2})
Ferry	Township	Oceana	1,271	1,292	−1.6%	1,296	33.29 sq mi (86.2 km^{2})	38.8/sq mi (15.0/km^{2})
Ferrysburg	City	Ottawa	2,952	2,892	+2.1%	3,040	2.99 sq mi (7.7 km^{2})	967.2/sq mi (373.4/km^{2})
Fife Lake	Village	Grand Traverse	456	443	+2.9%	466	0.75 sq mi (1.9 km^{2})	590.7/sq mi (228.1/km^{2})
Fife Lake	Township	Grand Traverse	1,526	1,517	+0.6%	1,517	34.6 sq mi (90 km^{2})	43.8/sq mi (16.9/km^{2})
Filer	Charter township	Manistee	2,318	2,325	−0.3%	2,208	15.75 sq mi (40.8 km^{2})	147.6/sq mi (57.0/km^{2})
Fillmore	Township	Allegan	2,778	2,681	+3.6%	2,756	28.35 sq mi (73.4 km^{2})	94.6/sq mi (36.5/km^{2})
Flat Rock	City	Wayne, Monroe	10,541	9,878	+6.7%	8,488	6.53 sq mi (16.9 km^{2})	1,512.7/sq mi (584.1/km^{2})
Flint†	City	Genesee	81,252	102,434	−20.7%	124,943	33.42 sq mi (86.6 km^{2})	3,065.1/sq mi (1,183.4/km^{2})
Flint	Charter township	Genesee	31,447	31,929	−1.5%	33,691	23.28 sq mi (60.3 km^{2})	1,371.5/sq mi (529.5/km^{2})
Florence	Township	St. Joseph	1,153	1,242	−7.2%	1,436	33.24 sq mi (86.1 km^{2})	37.4/sq mi (14.4/km^{2})
Flowerfield	Township	St. Joseph	1,587	1,562	+1.6%	1,592	35.46 sq mi (91.8 km^{2})	44.0/sq mi (17.0/km^{2})
Flushing	City	Genesee	8,411	8,389	+0.3%	8,348	3.62 sq mi (9.4 km^{2})	2,317.4/sq mi (894.8/km^{2})
Flushing	Charter township	Genesee	10,701	10,640	+0.6%	10,230	31.37 sq mi (81.2 km^{2})	339.2/sq mi (131.0/km^{2})
Flynn	Township	Sanilac	1,013	1,050	−3.5%	1,040	35.82 sq mi (92.8 km^{2})	29.3/sq mi (11.3/km^{2})
Ford River	Township	Delta	2,019	2,054	−1.7%	2,241	64.88 sq mi (168.0 km^{2})	31.7/sq mi (12.2/km^{2})
Forest	Township	Cheboygan	977	1,045	−6.5%	1,080	68.59 sq mi (177.6 km^{2})	15.2/sq mi (5.9/km^{2})
Forest	Township	Genesee	4,447	4,702	−5.4%	4,738	35.7 sq mi (92 km^{2})	131.7/sq mi (50.9/km^{2})
Forest	Township	Missaukee	1,184	1,157	+2.3%	1,082	35.13 sq mi (91.0 km^{2})	32.9/sq mi (12.7/km^{2})
Forester	Township	Sanilac	883	1,011	−12.7%	1,108	25.24 sq mi (65.4 km^{2})	40.1/sq mi (15.5/km^{2})
Forest Home	Township	Antrim	1,675	1,720	−2.6%	1,858	24.14 sq mi (62.5 km^{2})	71.3/sq mi (27.5/km^{2})
Forestville	Village	Sanilac	104	136	−23.5%	127	0.79 sq mi (2.0 km^{2})	172.2/sq mi (66.5/km^{2})
Fork	Township	Mecosta	1,627	1,604	+1.4%	1,678	34.78 sq mi (90.1 km^{2})	46.1/sq mi (17.8/km^{2})
Forsyth	Township	Marquette	6,194	6,164	+0.5%	4,824	177.67 sq mi (460.2 km^{2})	34.7/sq mi (13.4/km^{2})
Fort Gratiot	Charter township	St. Clair	11,242	11,108	+1.2%	10,691	15.96 sq mi (41.3 km^{2})	696.0/sq mi (268.7/km^{2})
Foster	Township	Ogemaw	788	843	−6.5%	821	89.23 sq mi (231.1 km^{2})	9.4/sq mi (3.6/km^{2})
Fountain	Village	Mason	170	193	−11.9%	175	1.01 sq mi (2.6 km^{2})	191.1/sq mi (73.8/km^{2})
Fowler	Village	Clinton	1,226	1,208	+1.5%	1,136	1.32 sq mi (3.4 km^{2})	915.2/sq mi (353.3/km^{2})
Fowlerville	Village	Livingston	2,951	2,886	+2.3%	2,972	2.34 sq mi (6.1 km^{2})	1,233.3/sq mi (476.2/km^{2})
Frankenlust	Township	Bay	3,672	3,562	+3.1%	2,530	21.05 sq mi (54.5 km^{2})	169.2/sq mi (65.3/km^{2})
Frankenmuth	City	Saginaw	4,987	4,944	+0.9%	4,838	2.99 sq mi (7.7 km^{2})	1,653.5/sq mi (638.4/km^{2})
Frankenmuth	Township	Saginaw	1,895	1,959	−3.3%	2,049	32.29 sq mi (83.6 km^{2})	60.7/sq mi (23.4/km^{2})
Frankfort	City	Benzie	1,252	1,286	−2.6%	1,513	1.39 sq mi (3.6 km^{2})	925.2/sq mi (357.2/km^{2})
Franklin	Township	Clare	730	825	−11.5%	809	35.33 sq mi (91.5 km^{2})	23.4/sq mi (9.0/km^{2})
Franklin	Township	Houghton	1,507	1,466	+2.8%	1,320	19.86 sq mi (51.4 km^{2})	73.8/sq mi (28.5/km^{2})
Franklin	Township	Lenawee	3,063	3,174	−3.5%	2,939	38.33 sq mi (99.3 km^{2})	82.8/sq mi (32.0/km^{2})
Franklin	Village	Oakland	3,139	3,150	−0.3%	2,937	2.66 sq mi (6.9 km^{2})	1,184.2/sq mi (457.2/km^{2})
Fraser	Township	Bay	2,994	3,192	−6.2%	3,375	32.43 sq mi (84.0 km^{2})	98.4/sq mi (38.0/km^{2})
Fraser	City	Macomb	14,726	14,480	+1.7%	15,297	4.14 sq mi (10.7 km^{2})	3,497.6/sq mi (1,350.4/km^{2})
Frederic	Township	Crawford	1,161	1,341	−13.4%	1,401	71.4 sq mi (185 km^{2})	18.8/sq mi (7.3/km^{2})
Fredonia	Township	Calhoun	1,585	1,626	−2.5%	1,723	34.02 sq mi (88.1 km^{2})	47.8/sq mi (18.5/km^{2})
Freedom	Township	Washtenaw	1,332	1,428	−6.7%	1,562	35.46 sq mi (91.8 km^{2})	40.3/sq mi (15.5/km^{2})
Freeman	Township	Clare	1,125	1,157	−2.8%	1,118	34.58 sq mi (89.6 km^{2})	33.5/sq mi (12.9/km^{2})
Freeport	Village	Barry	542	483	+12.2%	444	0.78 sq mi (2.0 km^{2})	619.2/sq mi (239.1/km^{2})
Free Soil	Village	Mason	158	144	+9.7%	177	1.04 sq mi (2.7 km^{2})	138.5/sq mi (53.5/km^{2})
Free Soil	Township	Mason	842	822	+2.4%	809	38.8 sq mi (100 km^{2})	21.2/sq mi (8.2/km^{2})
Fremont	Township	Isabella	1,445	1,455	−0.7%	1,358	35.85 sq mi (92.9 km^{2})	40.6/sq mi (15.7/km^{2})
Fremont	City	Newaygo	4,516	4,081	+10.7%	4,224	3.42 sq mi (8.9 km^{2})	1,193.3/sq mi (460.7/km^{2})
Fremont	Township	Saginaw	1,998	2,096	−4.7%	2,099	36.61 sq mi (94.8 km^{2})	57.3/sq mi (22.1/km^{2})
Fremont	Township	Sanilac	958	1,051	−8.8%	913	34.98 sq mi (90.6 km^{2})	30.0/sq mi (11.6/km^{2})
Fremont	Township	Tuscola	3,167	3,312	−4.4%	3,559	35.02 sq mi (90.7 km^{2})	94.6/sq mi (36.5/km^{2})
Frenchtown	Charter township	Monroe	21,609	20,428	+5.8%	20,777	41.82 sq mi (108.3 km^{2})	488.5/sq mi (188.6/km^{2})
Friendship	Township	Emmet	954	889	+7.3%	844	31.45 sq mi (81.5 km^{2})	28.3/sq mi (10.9/km^{2})
Frost	Township	Clare	1,038	1,047	−0.9%	1,159	34.95 sq mi (90.5 km^{2})	30.0/sq mi (11.6/km^{2})
Fruitland	Township	Muskegon	5,793	5,543	+4.5%	5,235	36.26 sq mi (93.9 km^{2})	152.9/sq mi (59.0/km^{2})
Fruitport	Village	Muskegon	1,103	1,093	+0.9%	1,124	0.91 sq mi (2.4 km^{2})	1,201.1/sq mi (463.7/km^{2})
Fruitport	Charter township	Muskegon	14,575	13,598	+7.2%	12,533	29.98 sq mi (77.6 km^{2})	453.6/sq mi (175.1/km^{2})
Fulton	Township	Gratiot	2,484	2,521	−1.5%	2,413	34.99 sq mi (90.6 km^{2})	72.0/sq mi (27.8/km^{2})
Gaastra	City	Iron	316	347	−8.9%	339	1.64 sq mi (4.2 km^{2})	211.6/sq mi (81.7/km^{2})
Gagetown	Village	Tuscola	321	388	−17.3%	389	0.98 sq mi (2.5 km^{2})	395.9/sq mi (152.9/km^{2})
Gaines	Village	Genesee	377	380	−0.8%	366	0.37 sq mi (0.96 km^{2})	1,027.0/sq mi (396.5/km^{2})
Gaines	Township	Genesee	6,664	6,820	−2.3%	6,491	35.1 sq mi (91 km^{2})	194.3/sq mi (75.0/km^{2})
Gaines	Charter township	Kent	28,812	25,146	+14.6%	20,112	35.7 sq mi (92 km^{2})	704.4/sq mi (272.0/km^{2})
Galesburg	City	Kalamazoo	2,049	2,009	+2.0%	1,988	1.41 sq mi (3.7 km^{2})	1,424.8/sq mi (550.1/km^{2})
Galien	Village	Berrien	513	549	−6.6%	593	0.42 sq mi (1.1 km^{2})	1,307.1/sq mi (504.7/km^{2})
Galien	Township	Berrien	1,412	1,452	−2.8%	1,611	21.98 sq mi (56.9 km^{2})	66.1/sq mi (25.5/km^{2})
Ganges	Township	Allegan	2,574	2,530	+1.7%	2,524	32.05 sq mi (83.0 km^{2})	78.9/sq mi (30.5/km^{2})
Garden	Village	Delta	174	221	−21.3%	240	0.81 sq mi (2.1 km^{2})	272.8/sq mi (105.3/km^{2})
Garden	Township	Delta	772	750	+2.9%	817	159.84 sq mi (414.0 km^{2})	4.7/sq mi (1.8/km^{2})
Garden City	City	Wayne	27,380	27,692	−1.1%	30,047	5.87 sq mi (15.2 km^{2})	4,717.5/sq mi (1,821.5/km^{2})
Garfield	Township	Bay	1,693	1,743	−2.9%	1,775	35.67 sq mi (92.4 km^{2})	48.9/sq mi (18.9/km^{2})
Garfield	Township	Clare	1,807	1,882	−4.0%	1,968	33.39 sq mi (86.5 km^{2})	56.4/sq mi (21.8/km^{2})
Garfield	Charter township	Grand Traverse	19,499	16,256	+19.9%	13,840	26.59 sq mi (68.9 km^{2})	611.4/sq mi (236.0/km^{2})
Garfield	Township	Kalkaska	984	804	+22.4%	794	106.16 sq mi (275.0 km^{2})	7.6/sq mi (2.9/km^{2})
Garfield	Township	Mackinac	1,166	1,146	+1.7%	1,251	134.52 sq mi (348.4 km^{2})	8.5/sq mi (3.3/km^{2})
Garfield	Township	Newaygo	2,486	2,537	−2.0%	2,464	31.73 sq mi (82.2 km^{2})	80.0/sq mi (30.9/km^{2})
Gaylord†	City	Otsego	4,286	3,645	+17.6%	3,681	4.8 sq mi (12 km^{2})	759.4/sq mi (293.2/km^{2})
Genesee	Charter township	Genesee	20,581	21,581	−4.6%	24,125	29.06 sq mi (75.3 km^{2})	742.6/sq mi (286.7/km^{2})
Geneva	Township	Midland	1,065	1,056	+0.9%	1,137	35.5 sq mi (92 km^{2})	29.7/sq mi (11.5/km^{2})
Geneva	Township	Van Buren	3,416	3,573	−4.4%	3,975	35.14 sq mi (91.0 km^{2})	101.7/sq mi (39.3/km^{2})
Genoa	Charter township	Livingston	20,692	19,821	+4.4%	15,901	34.05 sq mi (88.2 km^{2})	582.1/sq mi (224.8/km^{2})
Georgetown	Charter township	Ottawa	54,091	46,985	+15.1%	41,658	33.17 sq mi (85.9 km^{2})	1,416.5/sq mi (546.9/km^{2})
Germfask	Township	Schoolcraft	469	486	−3.5%	491	66.43 sq mi (172.1 km^{2})	7.3/sq mi (2.8/km^{2})
Gerrish	Township	Roscommon	2,796	2,993	−6.6%	3,072	27.6 sq mi (71 km^{2})	108.4/sq mi (41.9/km^{2})
Gibraltar	City	Wayne	4,997	4,656	+7.3%	4,264	3.78 sq mi (9.8 km^{2})	1,231.7/sq mi (475.6/km^{2})
Gibson	Township	Bay	1,124	1,210	−7.1%	1,245	35.54 sq mi (92.0 km^{2})	34.0/sq mi (13.1/km^{2})
Gilead	Township	Branch	656	661	−0.8%	753	21.06 sq mi (54.5 km^{2})	31.4/sq mi (12.1/km^{2})
Gilford	Township	Tuscola	735	741	−0.8%	833	34.82 sq mi (90.2 km^{2})	21.3/sq mi (8.2/km^{2})
Gilmore	Township	Benzie	791	821	−3.7%	850	7.13 sq mi (18.5 km^{2})	115.1/sq mi (44.5/km^{2})
Gilmore	Township	Isabella	1,314	1,459	−9.9%	1,376	35.59 sq mi (92.2 km^{2})	41.0/sq mi (15.8/km^{2})
Girard	Township	Branch	1,770	1,780	−0.6%	1,916	35.05 sq mi (90.8 km^{2})	50.8/sq mi (19.6/km^{2})
Gladstone	City	Delta	5,257	4,973	+5.7%	5,032	5 sq mi (13 km^{2})	994.6/sq mi (384.0/km^{2})
Gladwin†	City	Gladwin	3,069	2,933	+4.6%	3,001	2.89 sq mi (7.5 km^{2})	1,014.9/sq mi (391.8/km^{2})
Gladwin	Township	Gladwin	1,118	1,116	+0.2%	1,044	35.22 sq mi (91.2 km^{2})	31.7/sq mi (12.2/km^{2})
Glen Arbor	Township	Leelanau	757	859	−11.9%	788	28.33 sq mi (73.4 km^{2})	30.3/sq mi (11.7/km^{2})
Gobles	City	Van Buren	851	829	+2.7%	815	1.03 sq mi (2.7 km^{2})	804.9/sq mi (310.8/km^{2})
Golden	Township	Oceana	1,660	1,742	−4.7%	1,810	33.47 sq mi (86.7 km^{2})	52.0/sq mi (20.1/km^{2})
Goodar	Township	Ogemaw	350	398	−12.1%	493	35.45 sq mi (91.8 km^{2})	11.2/sq mi (4.3/km^{2})
Goodland	Township	Lapeer	1,735	1,828	−5.1%	1,734	35.58 sq mi (92.2 km^{2})	51.4/sq mi (19.8/km^{2})
Goodrich	Village	Genesee	2,022	1,860	+8.7%	1,353	2.2 sq mi (5.7 km^{2})	845.5/sq mi (326.4/km^{2})
Goodwell	Township	Newaygo	536	547	−2.0%	551	33.77 sq mi (87.5 km^{2})	16.2/sq mi (6.3/km^{2})
Gore	Township	Huron	152	144	+5.6%	139	6.8 sq mi (18 km^{2})	21.2/sq mi (8.2/km^{2})
Gourley	Township	Menominee	451	420	+7.4%	409	35.73 sq mi (92.5 km^{2})	11.8/sq mi (4.5/km^{2})
Grand Beach	Village	Berrien	310	272	+14.0%	221	0.91 sq mi (2.4 km^{2})	298.9/sq mi (115.4/km^{2})
Grand Blanc	City	Genesee	8,091	8,276	−2.2%	8,242	3.61 sq mi (9.3 km^{2})	2,292.5/sq mi (885.1/km^{2})
Grand Blanc	Charter township	Genesee	39,846	37,508	+6.2%	29,827	32.7 sq mi (85 km^{2})	1,147.0/sq mi (442.9/km^{2})
Grand Haven†	City	Ottawa	11,011	10,412	+5.8%	11,168	5.77 sq mi (14.9 km^{2})	1,804.5/sq mi (696.7/km^{2})
Grand Haven	Charter township	Ottawa	18,004	15,178	+18.6%	13,278	28.68 sq mi (74.3 km^{2})	529.2/sq mi (204.3/km^{2})
Grand Island	Township	Alger	35	47	−25.5%	45	22.48 sq mi (58.2 km^{2})	2.1/sq mi (0.8/km^{2})
Grand Ledge	City	Eaton	7,784	7,786	0.0%	7,813	3.57 sq mi (9.2 km^{2})	2,181.0/sq mi (842.1/km^{2})
Grand Rapids†	City	Kent	198,917	188,040	+5.8%	197,800	44.4 sq mi (115 km^{2})	4,235.1/sq mi (1,635.2/km^{2})
Grand Rapids	Charter township	Kent	18,905	16,661	+13.5%	14,056	15.34 sq mi (39.7 km^{2})	1,086.1/sq mi (419.4/km^{2})
Grandville	City	Kent	16,083	15,378	+4.6%	16,263	7.27 sq mi (18.8 km^{2})	2,115.3/sq mi (816.7/km^{2})
Grant	Township	Cheboygan	810	846	−4.3%	947	48.8 sq mi (126 km^{2})	17.3/sq mi (6.7/km^{2})
Grant	Township	Clare	3,360	3,259	+3.1%	3,034	32.76 sq mi (84.8 km^{2})	99.5/sq mi (38.4/km^{2})
Grant	Township	Grand Traverse	1,212	1,066	+13.7%	947	35.2 sq mi (91 km^{2})	30.3/sq mi (11.7/km^{2})
Grant	Township	Huron	869	913	−4.8%	833	35.35 sq mi (91.6 km^{2})	25.8/sq mi (10.0/km^{2})
Grant	Township	Iosco	1,528	1,546	−1.2%	1,560	34.88 sq mi (90.3 km^{2})	44.3/sq mi (17.1/km^{2})
Grant	Township	Keweenaw	238	219	+8.7%	172	119.2 sq mi (309 km^{2})	1.8/sq mi (0.7/km^{2})
Grant	Township	Mason	925	909	+1.8%	850	48.73 sq mi (126.2 km^{2})	18.7/sq mi (7.2/km^{2})
Grant	Township	Mecosta	702	686	+2.3%	680	32.64 sq mi (84.5 km^{2})	21.0/sq mi (8.1/km^{2})
Grant	City	Newaygo	952	894	+6.5%	881	0.64 sq mi (1.7 km^{2})	1,396.9/sq mi (539.3/km^{2})
Grant	Township	Newaygo	3,298	3,294	+0.1%	3,130	35.43 sq mi (91.8 km^{2})	93.0/sq mi (35.9/km^{2})
Grant	Township	Oceana	3,002	2,976	+0.9%	2,932	34.09 sq mi (88.3 km^{2})	87.3/sq mi (33.7/km^{2})
Grant	Township	St. Clair	1,829	1,891	−3.3%	1667	29.67 sq mi (76.8 km^{2})	63.7/sq mi (24.6/km^{2})
Grass Lake	Village	Jackson	1,105	1,173	−5.8%	1,082	0.94 sq mi (2.4 km^{2})	1,247.9/sq mi (481.8/km^{2})
Grass Lake	Charter township	Jackson	6,069	5,684	+6.8%	4,586	46.43 sq mi (120.3 km^{2})	122.4/sq mi (47.3/km^{2})
Grattan	Township	Kent	3,809	3,621	+5.2%	3,551	33.86 sq mi (87.7 km^{2})	106.9/sq mi (41.3/km^{2})
Grayling†	City	Crawford	1,867	1,884	−0.9%	1,952	2.01 sq mi (5.2 km^{2})	937.3/sq mi (361.9/km^{2})
Grayling	Charter township	Crawford	5,642	5,827	−3.2%	6,516	170.74 sq mi (442.2 km^{2})	34.1/sq mi (13.2/km^{2})
Green	Township	Alpena	1,117	1,228	−9.0%	1,205	71.04 sq mi (184.0 km^{2})	17.3/sq mi (6.7/km^{2})
Green	Charter township	Mecosta	3,219	3,292	−2.2%	3,209	36.98 sq mi (95.8 km^{2})	89.0/sq mi (34.4/km^{2})
Greenbush	Township	Alcona	1,270	1,409	−9.9%	1,499	24.92 sq mi (64.5 km^{2})	56.5/sq mi (21.8/km^{2})
Greenbush	Township	Clinton	2,143	2,199	−2.5%	2,115	35.18 sq mi (91.1 km^{2})	62.5/sq mi (24.1/km^{2})
Greendale	Township	Midland	1,731	1,751	−1.1%	1,788	35.37 sq mi (91.6 km^{2})	49.5/sq mi (19.1/km^{2})
Green Lake	Township	Grand Traverse	6,703	5,784	+15.9%	5,009	29.18 sq mi (75.6 km^{2})	198.2/sq mi (76.5/km^{2})
Greenland	Township	Ontonagon	628	792	−20.7%	870	113.19 sq mi (293.2 km^{2})	7.0/sq mi (2.7/km^{2})
Greenleaf	Township	Sanilac	815	781	+4.4%	804	35.92 sq mi (93.0 km^{2})	21.7/sq mi (8.4/km^{2})
Green Oak	Charter township	Livingston	19,539	17,476	+11.8%	15,618	34.3 sq mi (89 km^{2})	509.5/sq mi (196.7/km^{2})
Greenville	City	Montcalm	8,816	8,481	+4.0%	7,935	6.34 sq mi (16.4 km^{2})	1,337.7/sq mi (516.5/km^{2})
Greenwood	Township	Clare	1,108	1,041	+6.4%	1,059	35.2 sq mi (91 km^{2})	29.6/sq mi (11.4/km^{2})
Greenwood	Township	Oceana	1,156	1,184	−2.4%	1,154	34.25 sq mi (88.7 km^{2})	34.6/sq mi (13.3/km^{2})
Greenwood	Township	Oscoda	1,158	1,121	+3.3%	1,195	70 sq mi (180 km^{2})	16.0/sq mi (6.2/km^{2})
Greenwood	Township	St. Clair	1,490	1,538	−3.1%	1,373	35.8 sq mi (93 km^{2})	43.0/sq mi (16.6/km^{2})
Greenwood	Township	Wexford	633	587	+7.8%	542	35.36 sq mi (91.6 km^{2})	16.6/sq mi (6.4/km^{2})
Grim	Township	Gladwin	126	136	−7.4%	129	70.3 sq mi (182 km^{2})	1.9/sq mi (0.7/km^{2})
Grosse Ile	Township	Wayne	10,788	10,371	+4.0%	10,894	9.2 sq mi (24 km^{2})	1,127.3/sq mi (435.2/km^{2})
Grosse Pointe	City	Wayne	5,678	5,421	+4.7%	5,670	1.06 sq mi (2.7 km^{2})	5,114.2/sq mi (1,974.6/km^{2})
Grosse Pointe Farms	City	Wayne	10,148	9,479	+7.1%	9,764	2.75 sq mi (7.1 km^{2})	3,446.9/sq mi (1,330.9/km^{2})
Grosse Pointe Park	City	Wayne	11,595	11,555	+0.3%	12,443	2.17 sq mi (5.6 km^{2})	5,324.9/sq mi (2,055.9/km^{2})
Grosse Pointe Woods	City	Wayne	16,487	16,135	+2.2%	17,080	3.25 sq mi (8.4 km^{2})	4,964.6/sq mi (1,916.8/km^{2})
Grout	Township	Gladwin	1,974	1,964	+0.5%	1,869	34.18 sq mi (88.5 km^{2})	57.5/sq mi (22.2/km^{2})
Groveland	Township	Oakland	5,912	5,476	+8.0%	6,150	35.26 sq mi (91.3 km^{2})	155.3/sq mi (60.0/km^{2})
Gun Plain	Charter township	Allegan	6,148	5,895	+4.3%	5,637	34.06 sq mi (88.2 km^{2})	173.1/sq mi (66.8/km^{2})
Gustin	Township	Alcona	773	795	−2.8%	832	35.69 sq mi (92.4 km^{2})	22.3/sq mi (8.6/km^{2})
Hadley	Township	Lapeer	4,547	4,528	+0.4%	4,655	33.44 sq mi (86.6 km^{2})	135.4/sq mi (52.3/km^{2})
Hagar	Township	Berrien	3,243	3,671	−11.7%	3,964	18.36 sq mi (47.6 km^{2})	199.9/sq mi (77.2/km^{2})
Haight	Township	Ontonagon	203	212	−4.2%	228	105.74 sq mi (273.9 km^{2})	2.0/sq mi (0.8/km^{2})
Hamburg	Township	Livingston	21,259	21,165	+0.4%	20,627	32.24 sq mi (83.5 km^{2})	656.5/sq mi (253.5/km^{2})
Hamilton	Township	Clare	1,785	1,829	−2.4%	1,988	35.87 sq mi (92.9 km^{2})	51.0/sq mi (19.7/km^{2})
Hamilton	Township	Gratiot	427	465	−8.2%	491	34.66 sq mi (89.8 km^{2})	13.4/sq mi (5.2/km^{2})
Hamilton	Township	Van Buren	1,370	1,489	−8.0%	1,797	34.22 sq mi (88.6 km^{2})	43.5/sq mi (16.8/km^{2})
Hamlin	Township	Eaton	3,227	3,343	−3.5%	2,953	34.36 sq mi (89.0 km^{2})	97.3/sq mi (37.6/km^{2})
Hamlin	Township	Mason	3,711	3,408	+8.9%	3,192	27.44 sq mi (71.1 km^{2})	124.2/sq mi (48.0/km^{2})
Hampton	Charter township	Bay	9,695	9,652	+0.4%	9,902	27.33 sq mi (70.8 km^{2})	353.2/sq mi (136.4/km^{2})
Hamtramck	City	Wayne	28,433	22,423	+26.8%	22,976	2.09 sq mi (5.4 km^{2})	10,728.7/sq mi (4,142.4/km^{2})
Hancock	City	Houghton	4,501	4,634	−2.9%	4,323	2.6 sq mi (6.7 km^{2})	1,782.3/sq mi (688.2/km^{2})
Hancock	Township	Houghton	500	461	+8.5%	408	15.89 sq mi (41.2 km^{2})	29.0/sq mi (11.2/km^{2})
Handy	Township	Livingston	8,602	8,006	+7.4%	7,004	34.34 sq mi (88.9 km^{2})	233.1/sq mi (90.0/km^{2})
Hanover	Village	Jackson	472	441	+7.0%	424	0.42 sq mi (1.1 km^{2})	1,050.0/sq mi (405.4/km^{2})
Hanover	Township	Jackson	3,662	3,695	−0.9%	3,792	34.84 sq mi (90.2 km^{2})	106.1/sq mi (40.9/km^{2})
Hanover	Township	Wexford	1,698	1,560	+8.8%	1,200	35.99 sq mi (93.2 km^{2})	43.3/sq mi (16.7/km^{2})
Harbor Beach	City	Huron	1,604	1,703	−5.8%	1,837	1.75 sq mi (4.5 km^{2})	973.1/sq mi (375.7/km^{2})
Harbor Springs	City	Emmet	1,274	1,194	+6.7%	1,567	1.29 sq mi (3.3 km^{2})	925.6/sq mi (357.4/km^{2})
Haring	Charter township	Wexford	3,556	3,173	+12.1%	2,962	32.36 sq mi (83.8 km^{2})	98.1/sq mi (37.9/km^{2})
Harper Woods	City	Wayne	15,492	14,236	+8.8%	14,254	2.61 sq mi (6.8 km^{2})	5,454.4/sq mi (2,106.0/km^{2})
Harrietta	Village	Wexford	151	143	+5.6%	169	0.93 sq mi (2.4 km^{2})	153.8/sq mi (59.4/km^{2})
Harris	Township	Menominee	2,113	1,968	+7.4%	1,895	143.27 sq mi (371.1 km^{2})	13.7/sq mi (5.3/km^{2})
Harrison†	City	Clare	2,150	2,114	+1.7%	2,108	3.72 sq mi (9.6 km^{2})	568.3/sq mi (219.4/km^{2})
Harrison	Charter township	Macomb	24,314	24,587	−1.1%	24,461	14.46 sq mi (37.5 km^{2})	1,700.3/sq mi (656.5/km^{2})
Harrisville†	City	Alcona	437	493	−11.4%	514	0.61 sq mi (1.6 km^{2})	808.2/sq mi (312.0/km^{2})
Harrisville	Township	Alcona	1,307	1,348	−3.0%	1,411	30.33 sq mi (78.6 km^{2})	44.4/sq mi (17.2/km^{2})
Hart†	City	Oceana	2,053	2,126	−3.4%	1,950	1.91 sq mi (4.9 km^{2})	1,113.1/sq mi (429.8/km^{2})
Hart	Township	Oceana	2,028	1,853	+9.4%	2,026	32.42 sq mi (84.0 km^{2})	57.2/sq mi (22.1/km^{2})
Hartford	City	Van Buren	2,515	2,688	−6.4%	2,476	1.33 sq mi (3.4 km^{2})	2,021.1/sq mi (780.3/km^{2})
Hartford	Township	Van Buren	3,021	3,274	−7.7%	3,159	33.37 sq mi (86.4 km^{2})	98.1/sq mi (37.9/km^{2})
Hartland	Township	Livingston	15,256	14,663	+4.0%	10,996	35.86 sq mi (92.9 km^{2})	408.9/sq mi (157.9/km^{2})
Hartwick	Township	Osceola	591	567	+4.2%	629	35 sq mi (91 km^{2})	16.2/sq mi (6.3/km^{2})
Hastings†	City	Barry	7,514	7,350	+2.2%	7,095	5.19 sq mi (13.4 km^{2})	1,416.2/sq mi (546.8/km^{2})
Hastings	Charter township	Barry	3,013	2,948	+2.2%	2,930	30.02 sq mi (77.8 km^{2})	98.2/sq mi (37.9/km^{2})
Hatton	Township	Clare	893	933	−4.3%	923	35.89 sq mi (93.0 km^{2})	26.0/sq mi (10.0/km^{2})
Hawes	Township	Alcona	1,076	1,107	−2.8%	1,167	69.96 sq mi (181.2 km^{2})	15.8/sq mi (6.1/km^{2})
Hay	Township	Gladwin	1,279	1,362	−6.1%	1,402	21.45 sq mi (55.6 km^{2})	63.5/sq mi (24.5/km^{2})
Hayes	Township	Charlevoix	2,000	1,919	+4.2%	1,893	30.09 sq mi (77.9 km^{2})	63.8/sq mi (24.6/km^{2})
Hayes	Township	Clare	4,642	4,675	−0.7%	4,916	31.28 sq mi (81.0 km^{2})	149.5/sq mi (57.7/km^{2})
Hayes	Township	Otsego	2,725	2,619	+4.0%	2,385	69.15 sq mi (179.1 km^{2})	37.9/sq mi (14.6/km^{2})
Haynes	Township	Alcona	653	722	−9.6%	724	34.93 sq mi (90.5 km^{2})	20.7/sq mi (8.0/km^{2})
Hazel Park	City	Oakland	14,983	16,422	−8.8%	18,963	2.82 sq mi (7.3 km^{2})	5,823.4/sq mi (2,248.4/km^{2})
Hazelton	Township	Shiawassee	2,054	2,071	−0.8%	2,206	37.29 sq mi (96.6 km^{2})	55.5/sq mi (21.4/km^{2})
Heath	Township	Allegan	3,937	3,317	+18.7%	3,100	35.37 sq mi (91.6 km^{2})	93.8/sq mi (36.2/km^{2})
Hebron	Township	Cheboygan	298	269	+10.8%	303	34.05 sq mi (88.2 km^{2})	7.9/sq mi (3.1/km^{2})
Helena	Township	Antrim	937	1,001	−6.4%	878	16.2 sq mi (42 km^{2})	61.8/sq mi (23.9/km^{2})
Hematite	Township	Iron	269	338	−20.4%	352	153.45 sq mi (397.4 km^{2})	2.2/sq mi (0.9/km^{2})
Henderson	Township	Wexford	183	163	+12.3%	176	36.21 sq mi (93.8 km^{2})	4.5/sq mi (1.7/km^{2})
Hendricks	Township	Mackinac	117	153	−23.5%	183	78.97 sq mi (204.5 km^{2})	1.9/sq mi (0.7/km^{2})
Henrietta	Township	Jackson	4,673	4,705	−0.7%	4,483	35.98 sq mi (93.2 km^{2})	130.8/sq mi (50.5/km^{2})
Hersey	Village	Osceola	347	350	−0.9%	374	1.1 sq mi (2.8 km^{2})	318.2/sq mi (122.9/km^{2})
Hersey	Township	Osceola	1,941	1,950	−0.5%	1,846	35.35 sq mi (91.6 km^{2})	55.2/sq mi (21.3/km^{2})
Hesperia	Village	Newaygo, Oceana	1,034	954	+8.4%	954	0.79 sq mi (2.0 km^{2})	1,207.6/sq mi (466.3/km^{2})
Hiawatha	Township	Schoolcraft	1,305	1,302	+0.2%	1,328	277.43 sq mi (718.5 km^{2})	4.7/sq mi (1.8/km^{2})
Higgins	Township	Roscommon	1,864	1,932	−3.5%	2,061	70.36 sq mi (182.2 km^{2})	27.5/sq mi (10.6/km^{2})
Highland	Charter township	Oakland	19,172	19,202	−0.2%	19,169	34.11 sq mi (88.3 km^{2})	562.9/sq mi (217.4/km^{2})
Highland	Township	Osceola	1,148	1,250	−8.2%	1,207	37.38 sq mi (96.8 km^{2})	33.4/sq mi (12.9/km^{2})
Highland Park	City	Wayne	8,977	11,776	−23.8%	16,746	2.97 sq mi (7.7 km^{2})	3,965.0/sq mi (1,530.9/km^{2})
Hill	Township	Ogemaw	1,251	1,361	−8.1%	1,584	32.54 sq mi (84.3 km^{2})	41.8/sq mi (16.1/km^{2})
Hillman	Village	Montmorency, Alpena	605	701	−13.7%	685	1.65 sq mi (4.3 km^{2})	424.8/sq mi (164.0/km^{2})
Hillman	Township	Montmorency	2,009	2,175	−7.6%	2,267	67.63 sq mi (175.2 km^{2})	32.2/sq mi (12.4/km^{2})
Hillsdale†	City	Hillsdale	8,036	8,305	−3.2%	8,233	5.92 sq mi (15.3 km^{2})	1,402.9/sq mi (541.7/km^{2})
Hillsdale	Township	Hillsdale	2,002	2,033	−1.5%	1,965	12.32 sq mi (31.9 km^{2})	165.0/sq mi (63.7/km^{2})
Hinton	Township	Mecosta	1,054	1,126	−6.4%	1,035	35.73 sq mi (92.5 km^{2})	31.5/sq mi (12.2/km^{2})
Holland	Township	Missaukee	221	248	−10.9%	223	35.62 sq mi (92.3 km^{2})	7.0/sq mi (2.7/km^{2})
Holland	City	Ottawa, Allegan	34,378	33,051	+4.0%	35,048	16.59 sq mi (43.0 km^{2})	1,992.2/sq mi (769.2/km^{2})
Holland	Charter township	Ottawa	38,276	35,636	+7.4%	28,911	27.03 sq mi (70.0 km^{2})	1,318.4/sq mi (509.0/km^{2})
Holly	Village	Oakland	5,997	6,086	−1.5%	6,135	2.76 sq mi (7.1 km^{2})	2,205.1/sq mi (851.4/km^{2})
Holly	Township	Oakland	12,006	11,362	+5.7%	10,037	34.38 sq mi (89.0 km^{2})	330.5/sq mi (127.6/km^{2})
Holmes	Township	Menominee	341	335	+1.8%	296	71.37 sq mi (184.8 km^{2})	4.7/sq mi (1.8/km^{2})
Holton	Township	Muskegon	2,586	2,515	+2.8%	2,532	34.67 sq mi (89.8 km^{2})	72.5/sq mi (28.0/km^{2})
Home	Township	Montcalm	2,716	2,542	+6.8%	2,708	36 sq mi (93 km^{2})	70.6/sq mi (27.3/km^{2})
Home	Township	Newaygo	238	232	+2.6%	261	33.53 sq mi (86.8 km^{2})	6.9/sq mi (2.7/km^{2})
Homer	Village	Calhoun	1,575	1,668	−5.6%	1,851	1.4 sq mi (3.6 km^{2})	1,191.4/sq mi (460.0/km^{2})
Homer	Township	Calhoun	2,896	3,015	−3.9%	3,010	35.66 sq mi (92.4 km^{2})	84.5/sq mi (32.6/km^{2})
Homer	Township	Midland	3,993	4,009	−0.4%	3,924	21.11 sq mi (54.7 km^{2})	189.9/sq mi (73.3/km^{2})
Homestead	Township	Benzie	2,329	2,357	−1.2%	2,078	30.19 sq mi (78.2 km^{2})	78.1/sq mi (30.1/km^{2})
Honor	Village	Benzie	337	328	+2.7%	299	0.54 sq mi (1.4 km^{2})	607.4/sq mi (234.5/km^{2})
Hope	Township	Barry	3,154	3,239	−2.6%	3,283	32.48 sq mi (84.1 km^{2})	99.7/sq mi (38.5/km^{2})
Hope	Township	Midland	1,373	1,361	+0.9%	1,286	23.02 sq mi (59.6 km^{2})	59.1/sq mi (22.8/km^{2})
Hopkins	Village	Allegan	615	610	+0.8%	592	0.48 sq mi (1.2 km^{2})	1,270.8/sq mi (490.7/km^{2})
Hopkins	Township	Allegan	2,760	2,601	+6.1%	2,671	35.72 sq mi (92.5 km^{2})	72.8/sq mi (28.1/km^{2})
Horton	Township	Ogemaw	902	927	−2.7%	997	35.46 sq mi (91.8 km^{2})	26.1/sq mi (10.1/km^{2})
Houghton†	City	Houghton	8,386	7,708	+8.8%	7,010	4.45 sq mi (11.5 km^{2})	1,732.1/sq mi (668.8/km^{2})
Houghton	Township	Keweenaw	72	82	−12.2%	204	120.72 sq mi (312.7 km^{2})	0.7/sq mi (0.3/km^{2})
Howard	Township	Cass	6,275	6,207	+1.1%	6,309	34.52 sq mi (89.4 km^{2})	179.8/sq mi (69.4/km^{2})
Howard City	Village	Montcalm	1,835	1,808	+1.5%	1,585	2.53 sq mi (6.6 km^{2})	714.6/sq mi (275.9/km^{2})
Howell†	City	Livingston	10,068	9,489	+6.1%	9,232	4.75 sq mi (12.3 km^{2})	1,997.7/sq mi (771.3/km^{2})
Howell	Township	Livingston	7,893	6,702	+17.8%	5,679	31.82 sq mi (82.4 km^{2})	210.6/sq mi (81.3/km^{2})
Hubbardston	Village	Ionia, Clinton	369	395	−6.6%	394	1.54 sq mi (4.0 km^{2})	256.5/sq mi (99.0/km^{2})
Hudson	Township	Charlevoix	671	691	−2.9%	639	34.31 sq mi (88.9 km^{2})	20.1/sq mi (7.8/km^{2})
Hudson	City	Lenawee	2,415	2,307	+4.7%	2,499	2.19 sq mi (5.7 km^{2})	1,053.4/sq mi (406.7/km^{2})
Hudson	Township	Lenawee	1,499	1,497	+0.1%	1,576	35.39 sq mi (91.7 km^{2})	42.3/sq mi (16.3/km^{2})
Hudson	Township	Mackinac	193	181	+6.6%	214	68.77 sq mi (178.1 km^{2})	2.6/sq mi (1.0/km^{2})
Hudsonville	City	Ottawa	7,629	7,116	+7.2%	7,160	4.14 sq mi (10.7 km^{2})	1,718.8/sq mi (663.6/km^{2})
Hulbert	Township	Chippewa	171	168	+1.8%	211	70.85 sq mi (183.5 km^{2})	2.4/sq mi (0.9/km^{2})
Humboldt	Township	Marquette	413	464	−11.0%	469	92.67 sq mi (240.0 km^{2})	5.0/sq mi (1.9/km^{2})
Hume	Township	Huron	739	749	−1.3%	801	29.8 sq mi (77 km^{2})	25.1/sq mi (9.7/km^{2})
Huntington Woods	City	Oakland	6,388	6,238	+2.4%	6,151	1.47 sq mi (3.8 km^{2})	4,243.5/sq mi (1,638.4/km^{2})
Huron	Township	Huron	352	437	−19.5%	423	33.53 sq mi (86.8 km^{2})	13.0/sq mi (5.0/km^{2})
Huron	Charter township	Wayne	16,944	15,879	+6.7%	13,737	35.35 sq mi (91.6 km^{2})	449.2/sq mi (173.4/km^{2})
Ida	Township	Monroe	4,783	4,964	−3.6%	4,949	36.75 sq mi (95.2 km^{2})	135.1/sq mi (52.2/km^{2})
Imlay	Township	Lapeer	3,115	3,128	−0.4%	2,713	33.55 sq mi (86.9 km^{2})	93.2/sq mi (36.0/km^{2})
Imlay City	City	Lapeer	3,703	3,597	+2.9%	3,869	2.37 sq mi (6.1 km^{2})	1,517.7/sq mi (586.0/km^{2})
Independence	Charter township	Oakland	36,686	34,681	+5.8%	32,581	34.99 sq mi (90.6 km^{2})	991.2/sq mi (382.7/km^{2})
Indianfields	Township	Tuscola	2,492	6,048	−58.8%	6,392	33.75 sq mi (87.4 km^{2})	179.2/sq mi (69.2/km^{2})
Ingallston	Township	Menominee	924	935	−1.2%	1,042	70.89 sq mi (183.6 km^{2})	13.2/sq mi (5.1/km^{2})
Ingersoll	Township	Midland	2,775	2,751	+0.9%	3,018	36.46 sq mi (94.4 km^{2})	75.5/sq mi (29.1/km^{2})
Ingham	Township	Ingham	2,401	2,452	−2.1%	2,061	32.67 sq mi (84.6 km^{2})	75.1/sq mi (29.0/km^{2})
Inkster	City	Wayne	26,088	25,369	+2.8%	30,115	6.25 sq mi (16.2 km^{2})	4,059.0/sq mi (1,567.2/km^{2})
Inland	Township	Benzie	2,386	2,070	+15.3%	1,587	35.77 sq mi (92.6 km^{2})	57.9/sq mi (22.3/km^{2})
Interior	Township	Ontonagon	270	336	−19.6%	375	86.42 sq mi (223.8 km^{2})	3.9/sq mi (1.5/km^{2})
Inverness	Township	Cheboygan	2,159	2,261	−4.5%	2,278	33.86 sq mi (87.7 km^{2})	66.8/sq mi (25.8/km^{2})
Inwood	Township	Schoolcraft	654	733	−10.8%	722	120.22 sq mi (311.4 km^{2})	6.1/sq mi (2.4/km^{2})
Ionia†	City	Ionia	13,378	11,394	+17.4%	10,569	5.35 sq mi (13.9 km^{2})	2,129.7/sq mi (822.3/km^{2})
Ionia	Township	Ionia	3,961	3,779	+4.8%	3,669	33.5 sq mi (87 km^{2})	112.8/sq mi (43.6/km^{2})
Iosco	Township	Livingston	3,870	3,801	+1.8%	3,039	35.19 sq mi (91.1 km^{2})	108.0/sq mi (41.7/km^{2})
Ira	Township	St. Clair	4,967	5,178	−4.1%	6,966	17.03 sq mi (44.1 km^{2})	304.1/sq mi (117.4/km^{2})
Iron Mountain†	City	Dickinson	7,518	7,624	−1.4%	8,154	7.37 sq mi (19.1 km^{2})	1,034.5/sq mi (399.4/km^{2})
Iron River	City	Iron	3,007	3,029	−0.7%	1,929	6.74 sq mi (17.5 km^{2})	449.4/sq mi (173.5/km^{2})
Iron River	Township	Iron	1,052	1,027	+2.4%	1,585	238.25 sq mi (617.1 km^{2})	4.3/sq mi (1.7/km^{2})
Ironwood	City	Gogebic	5,045	5,387	−6.3%	6,293	6.42 sq mi (16.6 km^{2})	839.1/sq mi (324.0/km^{2})
Ironwood	Charter township	Gogebic	2,214	2,333	−5.1%	2,330	175.4 sq mi (454 km^{2})	13.3/sq mi (5.1/km^{2})
Irving	Township	Barry	3,734	3,250	+14.9%	2,682	35.76 sq mi (92.6 km^{2})	90.9/sq mi (35.1/km^{2})
Isabella	Township	Isabella	2,096	2,253	−7.0%	2,145	36.32 sq mi (94.1 km^{2})	62.0/sq mi (24.0/km^{2})
Ishpeming	City	Marquette	6,140	6,470	−5.1%	6,686	8.74 sq mi (22.6 km^{2})	740.3/sq mi (285.8/km^{2})
Ishpeming	Township	Marquette	3,392	3,513	−3.4%	3,522	86.29 sq mi (223.5 km^{2})	40.7/sq mi (15.7/km^{2})
Ithaca†	City	Gratiot	2,853	2,910	−2.0%	3,098	5.23 sq mi (13.5 km^{2})	556.4/sq mi (214.8/km^{2})
Jackson†	City	Jackson	31,309	33,534	−6.6%	36,316	10.86 sq mi (28.1 km^{2})	3,087.8/sq mi (1,192.2/km^{2})
James	Township	Saginaw	1,792	2,023	−11.4%	1,930	16.74 sq mi (43.4 km^{2})	120.8/sq mi (46.7/km^{2})
Jamestown	Charter township	Ottawa	9,630	7,034	+36.9%	5,062	35.38 sq mi (91.6 km^{2})	198.8/sq mi (76.8/km^{2})
Jasper	Township	Midland	1,060	1,180	−10.2%	1,145	35.92 sq mi (93.0 km^{2})	32.9/sq mi (12.7/km^{2})
Jefferson	Township	Cass	2,590	2,541	+1.9%	2,401	34.74 sq mi (90.0 km^{2})	73.1/sq mi (28.2/km^{2})
Jefferson	Township	Hillsdale	3,016	3,063	−1.5%	3,141	35.49 sq mi (91.9 km^{2})	86.3/sq mi (33.3/km^{2})
Jerome	Township	Midland	4,625	4,796	−3.6%	4,888	31.61 sq mi (81.9 km^{2})	151.7/sq mi (58.6/km^{2})
Johnstown	Township	Barry	2,841	3,008	−5.6%	3,067	34.95 sq mi (90.5 km^{2})	86.1/sq mi (33.2/km^{2})
Jonesfield	Township	Saginaw	1,618	1,667	−2.9%	1,710	25.2 sq mi (65 km^{2})	66.2/sq mi (25.5/km^{2})
Jonesville	City	Hillsdale	2,176	2,258	−3.6%	2,337	2.89 sq mi (7.5 km^{2})	781.3/sq mi (301.7/km^{2})
Jordan	Township	Antrim	887	992	−10.6%	875	35.08 sq mi (90.9 km^{2})	28.3/sq mi (10.9/km^{2})
Joyfield	Township	Benzie	763	799	−4.5%	777	19.92 sq mi (51.6 km^{2})	40.1/sq mi (15.5/km^{2})
Juniata	Township	Tuscola	1,563	1,567	−0.3%	1,673	34.76 sq mi (90.0 km^{2})	45.1/sq mi (17.4/km^{2})
Kalamazoo†	City	Kalamazoo	73,598	74,262	−0.9%	77,145	24.68 sq mi (63.9 km^{2})	3,009.0/sq mi (1,161.8/km^{2})
Kalamazoo	Charter township	Kalamazoo	22,777	21,918	+3.9%	21,675	11.68 sq mi (30.3 km^{2})	1,876.5/sq mi (724.5/km^{2})
Kalamo	Township	Eaton	1,765	1,842	−4.2%	1,742	36.6 sq mi (95 km^{2})	50.3/sq mi (19.4/km^{2})
Kaleva	Village	Manistee	507	470	+7.9%	509	1.1 sq mi (2.8 km^{2})	427.3/sq mi (165.0/km^{2})
Kalkaska†	Village	Kalkaska	2,132	2,020	+5.5%	2,226	3.12 sq mi (8.1 km^{2})	647.4/sq mi (250.0/km^{2})
Kalkaska	Township	Kalkaska	5,027	4,722	+6.5%	4,830	70.44 sq mi (182.4 km^{2})	67.0/sq mi (25.9/km^{2})
Kasson	Township	Leelanau	1,647	1,609	+2.4%	1,577	35.91 sq mi (93.0 km^{2})	44.8/sq mi (17.3/km^{2})
Kawkawlin	Township	Bay	4,419	4,848	−8.8%	5,104	32.41 sq mi (83.9 km^{2})	149.6/sq mi (57.8/km^{2})
Kearney	Township	Antrim	1,780	1,765	+0.8%	1,764	34.24 sq mi (88.7 km^{2})	51.5/sq mi (19.9/km^{2})
Keego Harbor	City	Oakland	2,764	2,970	−6.9%	2,769	0.5 sq mi (1.3 km^{2})	5,940.0/sq mi (2,293.4/km^{2})
Keeler	Township	Van Buren	1,968	2,169	−9.3%	2,601	33.73 sq mi (87.4 km^{2})	64.3/sq mi (24.8/km^{2})
Keene	Township	Ionia	1,730	1,831	−5.5%	1,660	35.58 sq mi (92.2 km^{2})	51.5/sq mi (19.9/km^{2})
Kenockee	Township	St. Clair	2,405	2,470	−2.6%	2,423	35.65 sq mi (92.3 km^{2})	69.3/sq mi (26.8/km^{2})
Kent City	Village	Kent	1,262	1,057	+19.4%	1,061	1.32 sq mi (3.4 km^{2})	800.8/sq mi (309.2/km^{2})
Kentwood	City	Kent	54,304	48,707	+11.5%	45,255	20.9 sq mi (54 km^{2})	2,330.5/sq mi (899.8/km^{2})
Kimball	Township	St. Clair	9,609	9,358	+2.7%	8,628	37.14 sq mi (96.2 km^{2})	252.0/sq mi (97.3/km^{2})
Kinde	Village	Huron	421	448	−6.0%	534	1.18 sq mi (3.1 km^{2})	379.7/sq mi (146.6/km^{2})
Kinderhook	Township	Branch	1,427	1,497	−4.7%	1,614	19.47 sq mi (50.4 km^{2})	76.9/sq mi (29.7/km^{2})
Kingsford	City	Dickinson	5,139	5,133	+0.1%	5,549	4.32 sq mi (11.2 km^{2})	1,188.2/sq mi (458.8/km^{2})
Kingsley	Village	Grand Traverse	1,431	1,480	−3.3%	1,469	1.42 sq mi (3.7 km^{2})	1,042.3/sq mi (402.4/km^{2})
Kingston	Village	Tuscola	399	440	−9.3%	450	1.02 sq mi (2.6 km^{2})	431.4/sq mi (166.6/km^{2})
Kingston	Township	Tuscola	1,476	1,574	−6.2%	1,615	34.82 sq mi (90.2 km^{2})	45.2/sq mi (17.5/km^{2})
Kinross	Charter township	Chippewa	6,139	7,561	−18.8%	5,922	119.72 sq mi (310.1 km^{2})	63.2/sq mi (24.4/km^{2})
Klacking	Township	Ogemaw	572	614	−6.8%	617	35.89 sq mi (93.0 km^{2})	17.1/sq mi (6.6/km^{2})
Kochville	Township	Saginaw	4,911	5,078	−3.3%	3,241	18.57 sq mi (48.1 km^{2})	273.5/sq mi (105.6/km^{2})
Koehler	Township	Cheboygan	1,193	1,283	−7.0%	1,168	43.56 sq mi (112.8 km^{2})	29.5/sq mi (11.4/km^{2})
Koylton	Township	Tuscola	1,485	1,585	−6.3%	1,579	34.91 sq mi (90.4 km^{2})	45.4/sq mi (17.5/km^{2})
Krakow	Township	Presque Isle	666	705	−5.5%	622	55.66 sq mi (144.2 km^{2})	12.7/sq mi (4.9/km^{2})
Lafayette	Township	Gratiot	516	591	−12.7%	656	36 sq mi (93 km^{2})	16.4/sq mi (6.3/km^{2})
LaGrange	Township	Cass	3,787	3,500	+8.2%	3,340	33.18 sq mi (85.9 km^{2})	105.5/sq mi (40.7/km^{2})
Laingsburg	City	Shiawassee	1,424	1,283	+11.0%	1,223	1.47 sq mi (3.8 km^{2})	872.8/sq mi (337.0/km^{2})
Laird	Township	Houghton	487	555	−12.3%	634	187.3 sq mi (485 km^{2})	3.0/sq mi (1.1/km^{2})
Lake	Township	Benzie	694	759	−8.6%	635	23.39 sq mi (60.6 km^{2})	32.4/sq mi (12.5/km^{2})
Lake	Charter township	Berrien	3,316	2,972	+11.6%	3,148	18.62 sq mi (48.2 km^{2})	159.6/sq mi (61.6/km^{2})
Lake	Township	Huron	657	855	−23.2%	996	20.51 sq mi (53.1 km^{2})	41.7/sq mi (16.1/km^{2})
Lake	Township	Lake	810	862	−6.0%	849	33.89 sq mi (87.8 km^{2})	25.4/sq mi (9.8/km^{2})
Lake	Township	Menominee	501	556	−9.9%	576	70.74 sq mi (183.2 km^{2})	7.9/sq mi (3.0/km^{2})
Lake	Township	Missaukee	2,827	2,800	+1.0%	2,468	31.57 sq mi (81.8 km^{2})	88.7/sq mi (34.2/km^{2})
Lake	Township	Roscommon	1,119	1,215	−7.9%	1,351	23.06 sq mi (59.7 km^{2})	52.7/sq mi (20.3/km^{2})
Lake Angelus	City	Oakland	287	290	−1.0%	326	1.07 sq mi (2.8 km^{2})	271.0/sq mi (104.6/km^{2})
Lake Ann	Village	Benzie	273	268	+1.9%	276	0.45 sq mi (1.2 km^{2})	595.6/sq mi (229.9/km^{2})
Lake City†	City	Missaukee	829	836	−0.8%	923	1.05 sq mi (2.7 km^{2})	796.2/sq mi (307.4/km^{2})
Lakefield	Township	Luce	1,135	1,061	+7.0%	1,074	63.18 sq mi (163.6 km^{2})	16.8/sq mi (6.5/km^{2})
Lakefield	Township	Saginaw	894	1,029	−13.1%	1,030	24.08 sq mi (62.4 km^{2})	42.7/sq mi (16.5/km^{2})
Lake Isabella	Village	Isabella	1,829	1,681	+8.8%	1,243	3.51 sq mi (9.1 km^{2})	478.9/sq mi (184.9/km^{2})
Lake Linden	Village	Houghton	1,014	1,007	+0.7%	1,081	0.77 sq mi (2.0 km^{2})	1,307.8/sq mi (504.9/km^{2})
Lake Odessa	Village	Ionia	1,994	2,018	−1.2%	2,272	0.89 sq mi (2.3 km^{2})	2,267.4/sq mi (875.5/km^{2})
Lake Orion	Village	Oakland	2,876	2,973	−3.3%	2,715	0.79 sq mi (2.0 km^{2})	3,763.3/sq mi (1,453.0/km^{2})
Laketon	Township	Muskegon	7,626	7,563	+0.8%	7,363	17.45 sq mi (45.2 km^{2})	433.4/sq mi (167.3/km^{2})
Laketown	Township	Allegan	5,928	5,505	+7.7%	5,561	21.55 sq mi (55.8 km^{2})	255.5/sq mi (98.6/km^{2})
Lakeview	Village	Montcalm	1,024	1,007	+1.7%	1,112	1.52 sq mi (3.9 km^{2})	662.5/sq mi (255.8/km^{2})
Lakewood Club	Village	Muskegon	1,340	1,291	+3.8%	1,006	1.91 sq mi (4.9 km^{2})	675.9/sq mi (261.0/km^{2})
Lamotte	Township	Sanilac	764	919	−16.9%	981	35.45 sq mi (91.8 km^{2})	25.9/sq mi (10.0/km^{2})
L'Anse†	Village	Baraga	1,874	2,011	−6.8%	2,107	2.53 sq mi (6.6 km^{2})	794.9/sq mi (306.9/km^{2})
L'Anse	Township	Baraga	3,551	3,843	−7.6%	3,926	247.40 sq mi (640.8 km^{2})	15.5/sq mi (6.0/km^{2})
Lansing‡	City	Ingham, Clinton, Eaton	112,644	114,297	−1.4%	119,128	36.05 sq mi (93.4 km^{2})	3,170.5/sq mi (1,224.1/km^{2})
Lansing	Charter township	Ingham	8,143	8,126	+0.2%	8,458	4.93 sq mi (12.8 km^{2})	1,648.3/sq mi (636.4/km^{2})
Lapeer†	City	Lapeer	9,023	8,841	+2.1%	9,072	7.13 sq mi (18.5 km^{2})	1,240.0/sq mi (478.8/km^{2})
Lapeer	Township	Lapeer	4,956	5,056	−2.0%	5,078	29.99 sq mi (77.7 km^{2})	168.6/sq mi (65.1/km^{2})
Larkin	Charter township	Midland	5,331	5,136	+3.8%	4,514	32.09 sq mi (83.1 km^{2})	160.0/sq mi (61.8/km^{2})
La Salle	Township	Monroe	4,639	4,894	−5.2%	5,001	26.57 sq mi (68.8 km^{2})	184.2/sq mi (71.1/km^{2})
Lathrup Village	City	Oakland	4,088	4,075	+0.3%	4,236	1.5 sq mi (3.9 km^{2})	2,716.7/sq mi (1,048.9/km^{2})
Laurium	Village	Houghton	1,864	1,977	−5.7%	2,126	0.65 sq mi (1.7 km^{2})	3,041.5/sq mi (1,174.3/km^{2})
Lawrence	Village	Van Buren	964	996	−3.2%	1,059	1.71 sq mi (4.4 km^{2})	582.5/sq mi (224.9/km^{2})
Lawrence	Township	Van Buren	3,289	3,259	+0.9%	3,341	34.62 sq mi (89.7 km^{2})	94.1/sq mi (36.3/km^{2})
Lawton	Village	Van Buren	1,850	1,900	−2.6%	1,859	2.32 sq mi (6.0 km^{2})	819.0/sq mi (316.2/km^{2})
Leavitt	Township	Oceana	911	891	+2.2%	845	29.33 sq mi (76.0 km^{2})	30.4/sq mi (11.7/km^{2})
Lebanon	Township	Clinton	597	605	−1.3%	705	35.1 sq mi (91 km^{2})	17.2/sq mi (6.7/km^{2})
Lee	Township	Allegan	3,805	4,015	−5.2%	4,114	35.18 sq mi (91.1 km^{2})	114.1/sq mi (44.1/km^{2})
Lee	Township	Calhoun	1,055	1,213	−13.0%	1,257	36.22 sq mi (93.8 km^{2})	33.5/sq mi (12.9/km^{2})
Lee	Township	Midland	3,985	4,315	−7.6%	4,411	35.62 sq mi (92.3 km^{2})	121.1/sq mi (46.8/km^{2})
Leelanau	Township	Leelanau	2,048	2,027	+1.0%	2,139	49.15 sq mi (127.3 km^{2})	41.2/sq mi (15.9/km^{2})
Leighton	Township	Allegan	7,001	4,934	+41.9%	3,652	34.87 sq mi (90.3 km^{2})	141.5/sq mi (54.6/km^{2})
Leland	Township	Leelanau	2,126	2,043	+4.1%	2,033	45.37 sq mi (117.5 km^{2})	45.0/sq mi (17.4/km^{2})
Lennon	Village	Genesee, Shiawassee	509	511	−0.4%	517	0.91 sq mi (2.4 km^{2})	561.5/sq mi (216.8/km^{2})
Lenox	Township	Macomb	12,119	10,470	+15.7%	8,433	38.71 sq mi (100.3 km^{2})	270.5/sq mi (104.4/km^{2})
Leonard	Village	Oakland	377	403	−6.5%	332	0.96 sq mi (2.5 km^{2})	419.8/sq mi (162.1/km^{2})
Leoni	Township	Jackson	13,847	13,807	+0.3%	13,459	48.54 sq mi (125.7 km^{2})	284.4/sq mi (109.8/km^{2})
Leonidas	Township	St. Joseph	1,161	1,185	−2.0%	1,239	35.51 sq mi (92.0 km^{2})	33.4/sq mi (12.9/km^{2})
Leroy	Township	Calhoun	3,659	3,712	−1.4%	3,240	36 sq mi (93 km^{2})	103.1/sq mi (39.8/km^{2})
Leroy	Township	Ingham	3,791	3,530	+7.4%	3,653	34.13 sq mi (88.4 km^{2})	103.4/sq mi (39.9/km^{2})
LeRoy	Village	Osceola	260	256	+1.6%	267	0.97 sq mi (2.5 km^{2})	263.9/sq mi (101.9/km^{2})
LeRoy	Township	Osceola	1,246	1,212	+2.8%	1,159	35 sq mi (91 km^{2})	34.6/sq mi (13.4/km^{2})
Leslie	City	Ingham	1,927	1,851	+4.1%	2,044	1.29 sq mi (3.3 km^{2})	1,434.9/sq mi (554.0/km^{2})
Leslie	Township	Ingham	2,305	2,389	−3.5%	2,327	34.9 sq mi (90 km^{2})	68.5/sq mi (26.4/km^{2})
Lexington	Village	Sanilac	943	1,178	−19.9%	1,104	1.4 sq mi (3.6 km^{2})	841.4/sq mi (324.9/km^{2})
Lexington	Township	Sanilac	3,485	3,658	−4.7%	3,688	36.04 sq mi (93.3 km^{2})	101.5/sq mi (39.2/km^{2})
Liberty	Township	Jackson	3,059	2,961	+3.3%	2,903	34.27 sq mi (88.8 km^{2})	86.4/sq mi (33.4/km^{2})
Liberty	Township	Wexford	936	861	+8.7%	800	36.51 sq mi (94.6 km^{2})	23.6/sq mi (9.1/km^{2})
Lilley	Township	Newaygo	835	797	+4.8%	788	30.41 sq mi (78.8 km^{2})	26.2/sq mi (10.1/km^{2})
Lima	Township	Washtenaw	4,024	3,307	+21.7%	3,224	34.53 sq mi (89.4 km^{2})	95.8/sq mi (37.0/km^{2})
Limestone	Township	Alger	392	438	−10.5%	407	74.23 sq mi (192.3 km^{2})	5.9/sq mi (2.3/km^{2})
Lincoln	Village	Alcona	305	337	−9.5%	364	0.83 sq mi (2.1 km^{2})	406.0/sq mi (156.8/km^{2})
Lincoln	Township	Arenac	924	942	−1.9%	1,522	21 sq mi (54 km^{2})	44.9/sq mi (17.3/km^{2})
Lincoln	Charter township	Berrien	14,929	14,691	+1.6%	13,952	17.91 sq mi (46.4 km^{2})	820.3/sq mi (316.7/km^{2})
Lincoln	Township	Clare	1,805	1,824	−1.0%	1,758	35.08 sq mi (90.9 km^{2})	52.0/sq mi (20.1/km^{2})
Lincoln	Township	Huron	727	807	−9.9%	873	35.48 sq mi (91.9 km^{2})	22.7/sq mi (8.8/km^{2})
Lincoln	Township	Isabella	2,069	2,115	−2.2%	1,936	36.12 sq mi (93.6 km^{2})	58.6/sq mi (22.6/km^{2})
Lincoln	Township	Midland	2,497	2,474	+0.9%	2,277	23.31 sq mi (60.4 km^{2})	106.1/sq mi (41.0/km^{2})
Lincoln	Township	Newaygo	1,292	1,275	+1.3%	1,338	34.35 sq mi (89.0 km^{2})	37.1/sq mi (14.3/km^{2})
Lincoln	Township	Osceola	1,462	1,500	−2.5%	1,629	35.13 sq mi (91.0 km^{2})	42.7/sq mi (16.5/km^{2})
Lincoln Park	City	Wayne	40,245	38,144	+5.5%	40,008	5.89 sq mi (15.3 km^{2})	6,476.1/sq mi (2,500.4/km^{2})
Linden	City	Genesee	4,142	3,991	+3.8%	2,861	2.36 sq mi (6.1 km^{2})	1,691.1/sq mi (652.9/km^{2})
Litchfield	City	Hillsdale	1,399	1,369	+2.2%	1,458	2.5 sq mi (6.5 km^{2})	547.6/sq mi (211.4/km^{2})
Litchfield	Township	Hillsdale	1,024	1,003	+2.1%	969	32.97 sq mi (85.4 km^{2})	30.4/sq mi (11.7/km^{2})
Littlefield	Township	Emmet	3,200	2,978	+7.5%	2,783	21.72 sq mi (56.3 km^{2})	137.1/sq mi (52.9/km^{2})
Little Traverse	Township	Emmet	2,657	2,380	+11.6%	2,426	17.96 sq mi (46.5 km^{2})	132.5/sq mi (51.2/km^{2})
Livingston	Township	Otsego	2,652	2,525	+5.0%	2,339	33.77 sq mi (87.5 km^{2})	74.8/sq mi (28.9/km^{2})
Livonia	City	Wayne	95,535	96,942	−1.5%	100,545	35.7 sq mi (92 km^{2})	2,715.5/sq mi (1,048.4/km^{2})
Locke	Township	Ingham	1,809	1,791	+1.0%	1,671	35.84 sq mi (92.8 km^{2})	50.0/sq mi (19.3/km^{2})
Lockport	Township	St. Joseph	3,729	3,787	−1.5%	3,814	28.6 sq mi (74 km^{2})	132.4/sq mi (51.1/km^{2})
Lodi	Township	Washtenaw	6,417	6,058	+5.9%	5,710	34.27 sq mi (88.8 km^{2})	176.8/sq mi (68.3/km^{2})
Logan	Township	Mason	329	312	+5.4%	329	36.02 sq mi (93.3 km^{2})	8.7/sq mi (3.3/km^{2})
Logan	Township	Ogemaw	596	551	+8.2%	581	35.23 sq mi (91.2 km^{2})	15.6/sq mi (6.0/km^{2})
London	Township	Monroe	2,984	3,048	−2.1%	3,024	35.76 sq mi (92.6 km^{2})	85.2/sq mi (32.9/km^{2})
Long Lake	Charter township	Grand Traverse	9,956	8,662	+14.9%	7,648	29.9 sq mi (77 km^{2})	289.7/sq mi (111.9/km^{2})
Long Rapids	Township	Alpena	977	1,010	−3.3%	1,019	54.19 sq mi (140.4 km^{2})	18.6/sq mi (7.2/km^{2})
Loud	Township	Montmorency	262	293	−10.6%	284	35.77 sq mi (92.6 km^{2})	8.2/sq mi (3.2/km^{2})
Lovells	Township	Crawford	567	626	−9.4%	578	100.55 sq mi (260.4 km^{2})	6.2/sq mi (2.4/km^{2})
Lowell	City	Kent	4,142	3,783	+9.5%	4,013	2.87 sq mi (7.4 km^{2})	1,318.1/sq mi (508.9/km^{2})
Lowell	Charter township	Kent	6,276	5,949	+5.5%	5,219	32.57 sq mi (84.4 km^{2})	182.7/sq mi (70.5/km^{2})
Ludington†	City	Mason	7,655	8,076	−5.2%	8,357	3.37 sq mi (8.7 km^{2})	2,396.4/sq mi (925.3/km^{2})
Luna Pier	City	Monroe	1,382	1,436	−3.8%	1,483	1.5 sq mi (3.9 km^{2})	957.3/sq mi (369.6/km^{2})
Luther	Village	Lake	332	318	+4.4%	339	0.92 sq mi (2.4 km^{2})	345.7/sq mi (133.5/km^{2})
Lyndon	Township	Washtenaw	2,656	2,720	−2.4%	2,728	32.02 sq mi (82.9 km^{2})	84.9/sq mi (32.8/km^{2})
Lynn	Township	St. Clair	1,117	1,229	−9.1%	1,187	35.72 sq mi (92.5 km^{2})	34.4/sq mi (13.3/km^{2})
Lyon	Charter township	Oakland	23,271	14,545	+60.0%	11,041	30.95 sq mi (80.2 km^{2})	470.0/sq mi (181.4/km^{2})
Lyon	Township	Roscommon	1,252	1,370	−8.6%	1,462	29.98 sq mi (77.6 km^{2})	45.7/sq mi (17.6/km^{2})
Lyons	Village	Ionia	763	789	−3.3%	726	1.22 sq mi (3.2 km^{2})	646.7/sq mi (249.7/km^{2})
Lyons	Township	Ionia	3,513	3,465	+1.4%	3,446	35.92 sq mi (93.0 km^{2})	96.5/sq mi (37.2/km^{2})
McBain	City	Missaukee	637	656	−2.9%	584	1.25 sq mi (3.2 km^{2})	524.8/sq mi (202.6/km^{2})
McBride	Village	Montcalm	189	205	−7.8%	232	0.38 sq mi (0.98 km^{2})	539.5/sq mi (208.3/km^{2})
Mackinac Island	City	Mackinac	583	492	+18.5%	523	4.35 sq mi (11.3 km^{2})	113.1/sq mi (43.7/km^{2})
Mackinaw	Township	Cheboygan	491	539	−8.9%	576	11.41 sq mi (29.6 km^{2})	47.2/sq mi (18.2/km^{2})
Mackinaw City	Village	Cheboygan, Emmet	846	806	+5.0%	859	3.38 sq mi (8.8 km^{2})	238.5/sq mi (92.1/km^{2})
McKinley	Township	Emmet	1,294	1,297	−0.2%	1,269	35.11 sq mi (90.9 km^{2})	36.9/sq mi (14.3/km^{2})
McKinley	Township	Huron	401	445	−9.9%	503	20.18 sq mi (52.3 km^{2})	22.1/sq mi (8.5/km^{2})
McMillan	Township	Luce	2,471	2,692	−8.2%	3,947	588.78 sq mi (1,524.9 km^{2})	4.6/sq mi (1.8/km^{2})
McMillan	Township	Ontonagon	406	478	−15.1%	601	70.43 sq mi (182.4 km^{2})	6.8/sq mi (2.6/km^{2})
Macomb	Township	Macomb	91,663	79,580	+15.2%	50,478	36.23 sq mi (93.8 km^{2})	2,196.5/sq mi (848.1/km^{2})
Macon	Township	Lenawee	1,330	1,486	−10.5%	1,448	32.68 sq mi (84.6 km^{2})	45.5/sq mi (17.6/km^{2})
Madison	Charter township	Lenawee	8,439	8,621	−2.1%	8,200	30.39 sq mi (78.7 km^{2})	283.7/sq mi (109.5/km^{2})
Madison Heights	City	Oakland	28,468	29,694	−4.1%	31,101	7.09 sq mi (18.4 km^{2})	4,188.2/sq mi (1,617.1/km^{2})
Mancelona	Village	Antrim	1,344	1,390	−3.3%	1,408	1 sq mi (2.6 km^{2})	1,390.0/sq mi (536.7/km^{2})
Mancelona	Township	Antrim	4,311	4,400	−2.0%	4,100	71.14 sq mi (184.3 km^{2})	61.8/sq mi (23.9/km^{2})
Manchester	City	Washtenaw	2,037	2,091	−2.6%	2,160	2.12 sq mi (5.5 km^{2})	986.3/sq mi (380.8/km^{2})
Manchester	Township	Washtenaw	4,626	4,569	+1.2%	4,102	37.86 sq mi (98.1 km^{2})	120.7/sq mi (46.6/km^{2})
Manistee†	City	Manistee	6,259	6,226	+0.5%	6,586	3.29 sq mi (8.5 km^{2})	1,892.4/sq mi (730.7/km^{2})
Manistee	Township	Manistee	4,022	4,084	−1.5%	3,764	44.38 sq mi (114.9 km^{2})	92.0/sq mi (35.5/km^{2})
Manistique†	City	Schoolcraft	2,828	3,097	−8.7%	3,583	3.19 sq mi (8.3 km^{2})	970.8/sq mi (374.8/km^{2})
Manistique	Township	Schoolcraft	1,045	1,095	−4.6%	1,053	149.34 sq mi (386.8 km^{2})	7.3/sq mi (2.8/km^{2})
Manlius	Township	Allegan	3,312	3,017	+9.8%	2,634	35.18 sq mi (91.1 km^{2})	85.8/sq mi (33.1/km^{2})
Mansfield	Township	Iron	236	241	−2.1%	243	99.08 sq mi (256.6 km^{2})	2.4/sq mi (0.9/km^{2})
Manton	City	Wexford	1,258	1,287	−2.3%	1,221	1.56 sq mi (4.0 km^{2})	825.0/sq mi (318.5/km^{2})
Maple Forest	Township	Crawford	598	653	−8.4%	498	35.3 sq mi (91 km^{2})	18.5/sq mi (7.1/km^{2})
Maple Grove	Township	Barry	1,599	1,593	+0.4%	1,471	35.89 sq mi (93.0 km^{2})	44.4/sq mi (17.1/km^{2})
Maple Grove	Township	Manistee	1,342	1,316	+2.0%	1,285	35.57 sq mi (92.1 km^{2})	37.0/sq mi (14.3/km^{2})
Maple Grove	Township	Saginaw	2,676	2,668	+0.3%	2,640	35.8 sq mi (93 km^{2})	74.5/sq mi (28.8/km^{2})
Maple Rapids	Village	Clinton	573	672	−14.7%	643	1.36 sq mi (3.5 km^{2})	494.1/sq mi (190.8/km^{2})
Maple Ridge	Township	Alpena	1,559	1,690	−7.8%	1,715	51.62 sq mi (133.7 km^{2})	32.7/sq mi (12.6/km^{2})
Maple Ridge	Township	Delta	694	766	−9.4%	808	108.26 sq mi (280.4 km^{2})	7.1/sq mi (2.7/km^{2})
Maple River	Township	Emmet	1,295	1,348	−3.9%	1,232	35.32 sq mi (91.5 km^{2})	38.2/sq mi (14.7/km^{2})
Maple Valley	Township	Montcalm	1,908	1,944	−1.9%	2,083	35.32 sq mi (91.5 km^{2})	55.0/sq mi (21.3/km^{2})
Maple Valley	Township	Sanilac	1,178	1,221	−3.5%	1,114	34.51 sq mi (89.4 km^{2})	35.4/sq mi (13.7/km^{2})
Marathon	Township	Lapeer	4,467	4,568	−2.2%	4,701	32.85 sq mi (85.1 km^{2})	139.1/sq mi (53.7/km^{2})
Marcellus	Village	Cass	1,074	1,198	−10.4%	1,162	0.58 sq mi (1.5 km^{2})	2,065.5/sq mi (797.5/km^{2})
Marcellus	Township	Cass	2,401	2,539	−5.4%	2,712	33.2 sq mi (86 km^{2})	76.5/sq mi (29.5/km^{2})
Marengo	Township	Calhoun	2,205	2,213	−0.4%	2,131	35.04 sq mi (90.8 km^{2})	63.2/sq mi (24.4/km^{2})
Marenisco	Township	Gogebic	455	1,727	−73.7%	1,051	310.89 sq mi (805.2 km^{2})	5.6/sq mi (2.1/km^{2})
Marilla	Township	Manistee	398	393	+1.3%	362	35.47 sq mi (91.9 km^{2})	11.1/sq mi (4.3/km^{2})
Marine City	City	St. Clair	4,079	4,248	−4.0%	4,652	2.15 sq mi (5.6 km^{2})	1,975.8/sq mi (762.9/km^{2})
Marion	Township	Charlevoix	1,657	1,714	−3.3%	1,492	25.57 sq mi (66.2 km^{2})	67.0/sq mi (25.9/km^{2})
Marion	Township	Livingston	11,245	9,996	+12.5%	6,757	34.9 sq mi (90 km^{2})	286.4/sq mi (110.6/km^{2})
Marion	Village	Osceola	789	872	−9.5%	836	1.35 sq mi (3.5 km^{2})	645.9/sq mi (249.4/km^{2})
Marion	Township	Osceola	1,565	1,692	−7.5%	1,580	37.01 sq mi (95.9 km^{2})	45.7/sq mi (17.7/km^{2})
Marion	Township	Saginaw	759	923	−17.8%	925	24.38 sq mi (63.1 km^{2})	37.9/sq mi (14.6/km^{2})
Marion	Township	Sanilac	1,578	1,659	−4.9%	1,803	36.08 sq mi (93.4 km^{2})	46.0/sq mi (17.8/km^{2})
Markey	Township	Roscommon	2,401	2,360	+1.7%	2,424	28.73 sq mi (74.4 km^{2})	82.1/sq mi (31.7/km^{2})
Marlette	City	Sanilac	1,855	1,875	−1.1%	2,104	1.64 sq mi (4.2 km^{2})	1,143.3/sq mi (441.4/km^{2})
Marlette	Township	Sanilac	1,686	1,763	−4.4%	2,051	52.43 sq mi (135.8 km^{2})	33.6/sq mi (13.0/km^{2})
Marquette	Township	Mackinac	611	603	+1.3%	659	97.05 sq mi (251.4 km^{2})	6.2/sq mi (2.4/km^{2})
Marquette†	City	Marquette	20,629	21,355	−3.4%	19,661	11.39 sq mi (29.5 km^{2})	1,874.9/sq mi (723.9/km^{2})
Marquette	Charter township	Marquette	4,140	3,905	+6.0%	3,286	55.3 sq mi (143 km^{2})	70.6/sq mi (27.3/km^{2})
Marshall†	City	Calhoun	6,822	7,088	−3.8%	7,459	6.28 sq mi (16.3 km^{2})	1,128.7/sq mi (435.8/km^{2})
Marshall	Township	Calhoun	3,157	3,115	+1.3%	2,922	31.13 sq mi (80.6 km^{2})	100.1/sq mi (38.6/km^{2})
Martin	Village	Allegan	377	410	−8.0%	435	0.78 sq mi (2.0 km^{2})	525.6/sq mi (203.0/km^{2})
Martin	Township	Allegan	2,723	2,629	+3.6%	2,514	35.53 sq mi (92.0 km^{2})	74.0/sq mi (28.6/km^{2})
Martiny	Township	Mecosta	1,594	1,625	−1.9%	1,606	31.98 sq mi (82.8 km^{2})	50.8/sq mi (19.6/km^{2})
Marysville	City	St. Clair	9,997	9,959	+0.4%	9,684	7.31 sq mi (18.9 km^{2})	1,362.4/sq mi (526.0/km^{2})
Mason	Township	Arenac	750	851	−11.9%	994	32.05 sq mi (83.0 km^{2})	26.6/sq mi (10.3/km^{2})
Mason	Township	Cass	2,841	2,945	−3.5%	2,514	20.22 sq mi (52.4 km^{2})	145.6/sq mi (56.2/km^{2})
Mason†	City	Ingham	8,283	8,252	+0.4%	6,714	5.1 sq mi (13 km^{2})	1,618.0/sq mi (624.7/km^{2})
Masonville	Township	Delta	1,645	1,734	−5.1%	1,877	167.8 sq mi (435 km^{2})	10.3/sq mi (4.0/km^{2})
Mastodon	Township	Iron	576	656	−12.2%	668	126.5 sq mi (328 km^{2})	5.2/sq mi (2.0/km^{2})
Matchwood	Township	Ontonagon	90	94	−4.3%	115	109.52 sq mi (283.7 km^{2})	0.9/sq mi (0.3/km^{2})
Mathias	Township	Alger	532	554	−4.0%	571	70.68 sq mi (183.1 km^{2})	7.8/sq mi (3.0/km^{2})
Mattawan	Village	Van Buren	2,550	1,997	+27.7%	2,536	3.81 sq mi (9.9 km^{2})	524.1/sq mi (202.4/km^{2})
Matteson	Township	Branch	1,173	1,218	−3.7%	1,285	35.77 sq mi (92.6 km^{2})	34.1/sq mi (13.1/km^{2})
Maybee	Village	Monroe	545	562	−3.0%	505	1 sq mi (2.6 km^{2})	562.0/sq mi (217.0/km^{2})
Mayfield	Township	Grand Traverse	1,786	1,550	+15.2%	1,271	35.92 sq mi (93.0 km^{2})	43.2/sq mi (16.7/km^{2})
Mayfield	Township	Lapeer	7,988	7,955	+0.4%	7,659	33.12 sq mi (85.8 km^{2})	240.2/sq mi (92.7/km^{2})
Mayville	Village	Tuscola	922	950	−2.9%	1,055	1.13 sq mi (2.9 km^{2})	840.7/sq mi (324.6/km^{2})
Meade	Township	Huron	698	720	−3.1%	799	35.64 sq mi (92.3 km^{2})	20.2/sq mi (7.8/km^{2})
Meade	Township	Mason	179	181	−1.1%	287	37.47 sq mi (97.0 km^{2})	4.8/sq mi (1.9/km^{2})
Mecosta	Village	Mecosta	386	457	−15.5%	440	1.12 sq mi (2.9 km^{2})	408.0/sq mi (157.5/km^{2})
Mecosta	Township	Mecosta	2,744	2,615	+4.9%	2,435	34.03 sq mi (88.1 km^{2})	76.8/sq mi (29.7/km^{2})
Medina	Township	Lenawee	1,115	1,090	+2.3%	1,227	47.54 sq mi (123.1 km^{2})	22.9/sq mi (8.9/km^{2})
Mellen	Township	Menominee	1,109	1,150	−3.6%	1,260	30.8 sq mi (80 km^{2})	37.3/sq mi (14.4/km^{2})
Melrose	Township	Charlevoix	1,405	1,403	+0.1%	1,388	32.98 sq mi (85.4 km^{2})	42.5/sq mi (16.4/km^{2})
Melvin	Village	Sanilac	148	180	−17.8%	160	0.97 sq mi (2.5 km^{2})	185.6/sq mi (71.6/km^{2})
Melvindale	City	Wayne	12,851	10,715	+19.9%	10,735	2.72 sq mi (7.0 km^{2})	3,939.3/sq mi (1,521.0/km^{2})
Memphis	City	Macomb, St. Clair	1,084	1,183	−8.4%	1,129	1.12 sq mi (2.9 km^{2})	1,056.3/sq mi (407.8/km^{2})
Mendon	Village	St. Joseph	881	870	+1.3%	917	1.01 sq mi (2.6 km^{2})	861.4/sq mi (332.6/km^{2})
Mendon	Township	St. Joseph	2,581	2,719	−5.1%	2,775	34.95 sq mi (90.5 km^{2})	77.8/sq mi (30.0/km^{2})
Menominee†	City	Menominee	8,488	8,599	−1.3%	9,131	5.15 sq mi (13.3 km^{2})	1,669.7/sq mi (644.7/km^{2})
Menominee	Township	Menominee	3,364	3,488	−3.6%	3,939	72.7 sq mi (188 km^{2})	48.0/sq mi (18.5/km^{2})
Mentor	Township	Cheboygan	857	818	+4.8%	781	35.7 sq mi (92 km^{2})	22.9/sq mi (8.8/km^{2})
Mentor	Township	Oscoda	1,037	1,143	−9.3%	1,220	142.06 sq mi (367.9 km^{2})	8.0/sq mi (3.1/km^{2})
Meridian	Charter township	Ingham	43,916	39,688	+10.7%	39,116	30.49 sq mi (79.0 km^{2})	1,301.7/sq mi (502.6/km^{2})
Merrill	Township	Newaygo	741	667	+11.1%	590	31.92 sq mi (82.7 km^{2})	20.9/sq mi (8.1/km^{2})
Merrill	Village	Saginaw	663	778	−14.8%	782	0.7 sq mi (1.8 km^{2})	1,111.4/sq mi (429.1/km^{2})
Merritt	Township	Bay	1,352	1,441	−6.2%	1,510	31.64 sq mi (81.9 km^{2})	45.5/sq mi (17.6/km^{2})
Mesick	Village	Wexford	397	394	+0.8%	447	1.29 sq mi (3.3 km^{2})	305.4/sq mi (117.9/km^{2})
Metamora	Village	Lapeer	594	565	+5.1%	507	0.83 sq mi (2.1 km^{2})	680.7/sq mi (262.8/km^{2})
Metamora	Township	Lapeer	4,368	4,249	+2.8%	4,184	34.21 sq mi (88.6 km^{2})	124.2/sq mi (48.0/km^{2})
Metz	Township	Presque Isle	280	302	−7.3%	331	35.58 sq mi (92.2 km^{2})	8.5/sq mi (3.3/km^{2})
Meyer	Township	Menominee	992	1,001	−0.9%	1,036	89.69 sq mi (232.3 km^{2})	11.2/sq mi (4.3/km^{2})
Michiana	Village	Berrien	200	182	+9.9%	200	0.37 sq mi (0.96 km^{2})	491.9/sq mi (189.9/km^{2})
Michigamme	Township	Marquette	327	349	−6.3%	377	133.19 sq mi (345.0 km^{2})	2.6/sq mi (1.0/km^{2})
Middle Branch	Township	Osceola	775	843	−8.1%	858	35.5 sq mi (92 km^{2})	23.7/sq mi (9.2/km^{2})
Middlebury	Township	Shiawassee	1,529	1,510	+1.3%	1,491	24.76 sq mi (64.1 km^{2})	61.0/sq mi (23.5/km^{2})
Middleville	Village	Barry	4,295	3,319	+29.4%	2,721	2.28 sq mi (5.9 km^{2})	1,455.7/sq mi (562.0/km^{2})
Midland†	City	Midland, Bay	42,547	41,863	+1.6%	41,685	33.69 sq mi (87.3 km^{2})	1,242.6/sq mi (479.8/km^{2})
Midland	Charter township	Midland	2,223	2,287	−2.8%	2,297	7.63 sq mi (19.8 km^{2})	299.7/sq mi (115.7/km^{2})
Mikado	Township	Alcona	850	947	−10.2%	1,043	71.36 sq mi (184.8 km^{2})	13.3/sq mi (5.1/km^{2})
Milan	Township	Monroe	1,571	1,601	−1.9%	1,670	34.18 sq mi (88.5 km^{2})	46.8/sq mi (18.1/km^{2})
Milan	City	Washtenaw, Monroe	6,079	5,836	+4.2%	4,775	3.32 sq mi (8.6 km^{2})	1,757.8/sq mi (678.7/km^{2})
Milford	Village	Oakland	6,520	6,175	+5.6%	6,272	2.43 sq mi (6.3 km^{2})	2,541.2/sq mi (981.1/km^{2})
Milford	Charter township	Oakland	17,090	15,736	+8.6%	15,271	32.99 sq mi (85.4 km^{2})	477.0/sq mi (184.2/km^{2})
Millbrook	Township	Mecosta	1,064	1,113	−4.4%	1,081	35.77 sq mi (92.6 km^{2})	31.1/sq mi (12.0/km^{2})
Millen	Township	Alcona	362	404	−10.4%	463	70.78 sq mi (183.3 km^{2})	5.7/sq mi (2.2/km^{2})
Millersburg	Village	Presque Isle	169	206	−18.0%	263	0.99 sq mi (2.6 km^{2})	208.1/sq mi (80.3/km^{2})
Millington	Village	Tuscola	1,028	1,072	−4.1%	1,137	1.35 sq mi (3.5 km^{2})	794.1/sq mi (306.6/km^{2})
Millington	Township	Tuscola	4,246	4,354	−2.5%	4,459	35.44 sq mi (91.8 km^{2})	122.9/sq mi (47.4/km^{2})
Mills	Township	Midland	1,775	1,939	−8.5%	1,871	35.56 sq mi (92.1 km^{2})	54.5/sq mi (21.1/km^{2})
Mills	Township	Ogemaw	3,973	4,291	−7.4%	4,005	34.22 sq mi (88.6 km^{2})	125.4/sq mi (48.4/km^{2})
Milton	Township	Antrim	2,355	2,204	+6.9%	2,072	25.56 sq mi (66.2 km^{2})	86.2/sq mi (33.3/km^{2})
Milton	Township	Cass	3,128	3,878	−19.3%	2,646	21.11 sq mi (54.7 km^{2})	183.7/sq mi (70.9/km^{2})
Minden	Township	Sanilac	558	545	+2.4%	633	36.1 sq mi (93 km^{2})	15.1/sq mi (5.8/km^{2})
Minden City	Village	Sanilac	165	197	−16.2%	242	1.1 sq mi (2.8 km^{2})	179.1/sq mi (69.1/km^{2})
Mitchell	Township	Alcona	354	352	+0.6%	396	142.54 sq mi (369.2 km^{2})	2.5/sq mi (1.0/km^{2})
Moffatt	Township	Arenac	1,166	1,184	−1.5%	1,121	31.51 sq mi (81.6 km^{2})	37.6/sq mi (14.5/km^{2})
Moltke	Township	Presque Isle	291	296	−1.7%	352	33.91 sq mi (87.8 km^{2})	8.7/sq mi (3.4/km^{2})
Monitor	Charter township	Bay	10,687	10,735	−0.4%	10,037	36.78 sq mi (95.3 km^{2})	291.9/sq mi (112.7/km^{2})
Monroe†	City	Monroe	20,462	20,733	−1.3%	22,076	9.17 sq mi (23.8 km^{2})	2,261.0/sq mi (873.0/km^{2})
Monroe	Charter township	Monroe	14,391	14,568	−1.2%	13,491	16.9 sq mi (44 km^{2})	862.0/sq mi (332.8/km^{2})
Monroe	Township	Newaygo	328	320	+2.5%	324	32.84 sq mi (85.1 km^{2})	9.7/sq mi (3.8/km^{2})
Montague	City	Muskegon	2,417	2,361	+2.4%	2,407	2.56 sq mi (6.6 km^{2})	922.3/sq mi (356.1/km^{2})
Montague	Township	Muskegon	1,555	1,600	−2.8%	1,637	18.58 sq mi (48.1 km^{2})	86.1/sq mi (33.2/km^{2})
Montcalm	Township	Montcalm	3,394	3,350	+1.3%	3,178	35.43 sq mi (91.8 km^{2})	94.6/sq mi (36.5/km^{2})
Monterey	Township	Allegan	2,436	2,356	+3.4%	2,065	35.7 sq mi (92 km^{2})	66.0/sq mi (25.5/km^{2})
Montgomery	Village	Hillsdale	322	342	−5.8%	386	1 sq mi (2.6 km^{2})	342.0/sq mi (132.0/km^{2})
Montmorency	Township	Montmorency	1,016	1,117	−9.0%	1,202	136.61 sq mi (353.8 km^{2})	8.2/sq mi (3.2/km^{2})
Montrose	City	Genesee	1,743	1,657	+5.2%	1,619	0.98 sq mi (2.5 km^{2})	1,690.8/sq mi (652.8/km^{2})
Montrose	Charter township	Genesee	6,005	6,224	−3.5%	6,336	34.25 sq mi (88.7 km^{2})	181.7/sq mi (70.2/km^{2})
Moore	Township	Sanilac	1,110	1,203	−7.7%	1,262	36.3 sq mi (94 km^{2})	33.1/sq mi (12.8/km^{2})
Moorland	Township	Muskegon	1,627	1,575	+3.3%	1,616	35.68 sq mi (92.4 km^{2})	44.1/sq mi (17.0/km^{2})
Moran	Township	Mackinac	1,029	994	+3.5%	1,080	127.52 sq mi (330.3 km^{2})	7.8/sq mi (3.0/km^{2})
Morenci	City	Lenawee	2,270	2,220	+2.3%	2,398	2.12 sq mi (5.5 km^{2})	1,047.2/sq mi (404.3/km^{2})
Morley	Village	Mecosta	517	493	+4.9%	495	0.89 sq mi (2.3 km^{2})	553.9/sq mi (213.9/km^{2})
Morrice	Village	Shiawassee	949	927	+2.4%	882	1.3 sq mi (3.4 km^{2})	713.1/sq mi (275.3/km^{2})
Morton	Township	Mecosta	4,426	4,311	+2.7%	3,597	33.04 sq mi (85.6 km^{2})	130.5/sq mi (50.4/km^{2})
Moscow	Township	Hillsdale	1,367	1,470	−7.0%	1,445	35.15 sq mi (91.0 km^{2})	41.8/sq mi (16.1/km^{2})
Mottville	Township	St. Joseph	1,444	1,436	+0.6%	1,499	19.32 sq mi (50.0 km^{2})	74.3/sq mi (28.7/km^{2})
Mount Clemens†	City	Macomb	15,697	16,314	−3.8%	17,312	4.07 sq mi (10.5 km^{2})	4,008.4/sq mi (1,547.6/km^{2})
Mount Forest	Township	Bay	1,399	1,392	+0.5%	1,405	35.91 sq mi (93.0 km^{2})	38.8/sq mi (15.0/km^{2})
Mount Haley	Township	Midland	1,609	1,678	−4.1%	1,654	23.82 sq mi (61.7 km^{2})	70.4/sq mi (27.2/km^{2})
Mount Morris	City	Genesee	3,170	3,086	+2.7%	3,194	1.2 sq mi (3.1 km^{2})	2,571.7/sq mi (992.9/km^{2})
Mount Morris	Charter township	Genesee	20,024	21,501	−6.9%	23,725	31.51 sq mi (81.6 km^{2})	682.4/sq mi (263.5/km^{2})
Mount Pleasant†	City	Isabella	21,688	26,016	−16.6%	25,946	7.74 sq mi (20.0 km^{2})	3,361.2/sq mi (1,297.8/km^{2})
Mueller	Township	Schoolcraft	260	234	+11.1%	245	83.61 sq mi (216.5 km^{2})	2.8/sq mi (1.1/km^{2})
Muir	Village	Ionia	646	604	+7.0%	634	0.71 sq mi (1.8 km^{2})	850.7/sq mi (328.5/km^{2})
Mullett	Township	Cheboygan	1,236	1,312	−5.8%	1,284	18.99 sq mi (49.2 km^{2})	69.1/sq mi (26.7/km^{2})
Mulliken	Village	Eaton	525	553	−5.1%	557	1.04 sq mi (2.7 km^{2})	531.7/sq mi (205.3/km^{2})
Mundy	Charter township	Genesee	15,281	15,082	+1.3%	12,191	36.03 sq mi (93.3 km^{2})	418.6/sq mi (161.6/km^{2})
Munising†	City	Alger	1,986	2,355	−15.7%	2,539	5.25 sq mi (13.6 km^{2})	448.6/sq mi (173.2/km^{2})
Munising	Township	Alger	2,865	2,983	−4.0%	3,125	202.21 sq mi (523.7 km^{2})	14.8/sq mi (5.7/km^{2})
Munro	Township	Cheboygan	592	571	+3.7%	679	28.4 sq mi (74 km^{2})	20.1/sq mi (7.8/km^{2})
Muskegon†	City	Muskegon	38,318	38,401	−0.2%	40,105	14.21 sq mi (36.8 km^{2})	2,702.4/sq mi (1,043.4/km^{2})
Muskegon	Charter township	Muskegon	17,596	17,840	−1.4%	17,737	22.94 sq mi (59.4 km^{2})	777.7/sq mi (300.3/km^{2})
Muskegon Heights	City	Muskegon	9,917	10,856	−8.6%	12,049	3.19 sq mi (8.3 km^{2})	3,403.1/sq mi (1,314.0/km^{2})
Mussey	Township	St. Clair	4,234	4,206	+0.7%	3,740	35.68 sq mi (92.4 km^{2})	117.9/sq mi (45.5/km^{2})
Nadeau	Township	Menominee	1,090	1,161	−6.1%	1,160	80.75 sq mi (209.1 km^{2})	14.4/sq mi (5.6/km^{2})
Nahma	Township	Delta	468	495	−5.5%	499	166.37 sq mi (430.9 km^{2})	3.0/sq mi (1.1/km^{2})
Napoleon	Township	Jackson	6,789	6,776	+0.2%	6,962	28.94 sq mi (75.0 km^{2})	234.1/sq mi (90.4/km^{2})
Nashville	Village	Barry	1,537	1,628	−5.6%	1,684	2.12 sq mi (5.5 km^{2})	767.9/sq mi (296.5/km^{2})
Negaunee	City	Marquette	4,627	4,568	+1.3%	4,576	13.56 sq mi (35.1 km^{2})	336.9/sq mi (130.1/km^{2})
Negaunee	Township	Marquette	3,232	3,088	+4.7%	2,707	42.08 sq mi (109.0 km^{2})	73.4/sq mi (28.3/km^{2})
Nelson	Township	Kent	4,895	4,764	+2.7%	4,192	35.21 sq mi (91.2 km^{2})	135.3/sq mi (52.2/km^{2})
Nester	Township	Roscommon	262	295	−11.2%	263	71.35 sq mi (184.8 km^{2})	4.1/sq mi (1.6/km^{2})
Newark	Township	Gratiot	1,112	1,093	+1.7%	1,149	34.38 sq mi (89.0 km^{2})	31.8/sq mi (12.3/km^{2})
Newaygo	City	Newaygo	2,471	1,976	+25.1%	1,670	3.74 sq mi (9.7 km^{2})	528.3/sq mi (204.0/km^{2})
New Baltimore	City	Macomb	12,117	12,084	+0.3%	7,405	4.61 sq mi (11.9 km^{2})	2,621.3/sq mi (1,012.1/km^{2})
Newberg	Township	Cass	1,602	1,632	−1.8%	1,703	34.54 sq mi (89.5 km^{2})	47.2/sq mi (18.2/km^{2})
Newberry†	Village	Luce	1,446	1,519	−4.8%	2,686	0.98 sq mi (2.5 km^{2})	1,550.0/sq mi (598.5/km^{2})
New Buffalo	City	Berrien	1,708	1,883	−9.3%	2,200	2.5 sq mi (6.5 km^{2})	753.2/sq mi (290.8/km^{2})
New Buffalo	Township	Berrien	2,455	2,386	+2.9%	2,468	20.01 sq mi (51.8 km^{2})	119.2/sq mi (46.0/km^{2})
New Era	Village	Oceana	446	451	−1.1%	461	0.84 sq mi (2.2 km^{2})	536.9/sq mi (207.3/km^{2})
Newfield	Township	Oceana	2,329	2,401	−3.0%	2,483	32.28 sq mi (83.6 km^{2})	74.4/sq mi (28.7/km^{2})
New Haven	Township	Gratiot	1,064	1,004	+6.0%	1,016	35.57 sq mi (92.1 km^{2})	28.2/sq mi (10.9/km^{2})
New Haven	Village	Macomb	6,097	4,642	+31.3%	3071	2.53 sq mi (6.6 km^{2})	1,834.8/sq mi (708.4/km^{2})
New Haven	Township	Shiawassee	1,218	1,329	−8.4%	1,293	35.59 sq mi (92.2 km^{2})	37.3/sq mi (14.4/km^{2})
Newkirk	Township	Lake	655	632	+3.6%	719	72.8 sq mi (189 km^{2})	8.7/sq mi (3.4/km^{2})
New Lothrop	Village	Shiawassee	565	581	−2.8%	603	0.81 sq mi (2.1 km^{2})	717.3/sq mi (276.9/km^{2})
Newton	Township	Calhoun	2,781	2,551	+9.0%	2,493	36 sq mi (93 km^{2})	70.9/sq mi (27.4/km^{2})
Newton	Township	Mackinac	430	427	+0.7%	356	148.6 sq mi (385 km^{2})	2.9/sq mi (1.1/km^{2})
Niles	City	Berrien, Cass	11,988	11,600	+3.3%	12,204	5.79 sq mi (15.0 km^{2})	2,003.5/sq mi (773.5/km^{2})
Niles	Charter township	Berrien	14,417	14,164	+1.8%	13,325	37.32 sq mi (96.7 km^{2})	379.5/sq mi (146.5/km^{2})
Noble	Township	Branch	458	520	−11.9%	518	20.96 sq mi (54.3 km^{2})	24.8/sq mi (9.6/km^{2})
Norman	Township	Manistee	1,567	1,553	+0.9%	1,676	70.81 sq mi (183.4 km^{2})	21.9/sq mi (8.5/km^{2})
North Adams	Village	Hillsdale	452	477	−5.2%	514	0.52 sq mi (1.3 km^{2})	917.3/sq mi (354.2/km^{2})
North Allis	Township	Presque Isle	467	521	−10.4%	618	32.72 sq mi (84.7 km^{2})	15.9/sq mi (6.1/km^{2})
North Branch	Village	Lapeer	1,096	1,033	+6.1%	1,027	1.33 sq mi (3.4 km^{2})	776.7/sq mi (299.9/km^{2})
North Branch	Township	Lapeer	3,571	3,645	−2.0%	3,595	36.08 sq mi (93.4 km^{2})	101.0/sq mi (39.0/km^{2})
Northfield	Township	Washtenaw	8,550	8,245	+3.7%	8,252	35.77 sq mi (92.6 km^{2})	230.5/sq mi (89.0/km^{2})
North Muskegon	City	Muskegon	4,093	3,786	+8.1%	4,031	1.76 sq mi (4.6 km^{2})	2,151.1/sq mi (830.6/km^{2})
North Plains	Township	Ionia	1,191	1,279	−6.9%	1,366	35.75 sq mi (92.6 km^{2})	35.8/sq mi (13.8/km^{2})
Northport	Village	Leelanau	496	526	−5.7%	648	1.65 sq mi (4.3 km^{2})	318.8/sq mi (123.1/km^{2})
North Shade	Township	Gratiot	558	665	−16.1%	706	35.61 sq mi (92.2 km^{2})	18.7/sq mi (7.2/km^{2})
North Star	Township	Gratiot	895	888	+0.8%	996	34.1 sq mi (88 km^{2})	26.0/sq mi (10.1/km^{2})
Northville	City	Oakland, Wayne	6,119	5,970	+2.5%	6,459	2.05 sq mi (5.3 km^{2})	2,912.2/sq mi (1,124.4/km^{2})
Northville	Charter township	Wayne	31,758	28,497	+11.4%	21,036	16.19 sq mi (41.9 km^{2})	1,760.2/sq mi (679.6/km^{2})
Norton Shores	City	Muskegon	25,030	23,994	+4.3%	22,527	23.24 sq mi (60.2 km^{2})	1,032.4/sq mi (398.6/km^{2})
Norvell	Township	Jackson	2,800	2,963	−5.5%	2,922	29.53 sq mi (76.5 km^{2})	100.3/sq mi (38.7/km^{2})
Norway	City	Dickinson	2,840	2,845	−0.2%	2,959	8.72 sq mi (22.6 km^{2})	326.3/sq mi (126.0/km^{2})
Norway	Township	Dickinson	1,535	1,489	+3.1%	1,639	88.52 sq mi (229.3 km^{2})	16.8/sq mi (6.5/km^{2})
Norwich	Township	Missaukee	631	611	+3.3%	646	71.92 sq mi (186.3 km^{2})	8.5/sq mi (3.3/km^{2})
Norwich	Township	Newaygo	547	607	−9.9%	557	34.53 sq mi (89.4 km^{2})	17.6/sq mi (6.8/km^{2})
Norwood	Township	Charlevoix	700	723	−3.2%	714	18.16 sq mi (47.0 km^{2})	39.8/sq mi (15.4/km^{2})
Nottawa	Township	Isabella	2,225	2,282	−2.5%	2,278	35.31 sq mi (91.5 km^{2})	64.6/sq mi (25.0/km^{2})
Nottawa	Township	St. Joseph	3,685	3,858	−4.5%	3,999	35.62 sq mi (92.3 km^{2})	108.3/sq mi (41.8/km^{2})
Novesta	Township	Tuscola	1,443	1,491	−3.2%	1,606	35.28 sq mi (91.4 km^{2})	42.3/sq mi (16.3/km^{2})
Novi	City	Oakland	66,243	55,224	+20.0%	47,386	30.26 sq mi (78.4 km^{2})	1,825.0/sq mi (704.6/km^{2})
Novi	Township	Oakland	160	150	+6.7%	193	0.11 sq mi (0.28 km^{2})	1,363.6/sq mi (526.5/km^{2})
Nunda	Township	Cheboygan	1,195	1,042	+14.7%	925	70.26 sq mi (182.0 km^{2})	14.8/sq mi (5.7/km^{2})
Oakfield	Township	Kent	6,107	5,782	+5.6%	5,058	33.81 sq mi (87.6 km^{2})	171.0/sq mi (66.0/km^{2})
Oakland	Charter township	Oakland	20,067	16,779	+19.6%	13,071	36.3 sq mi (94 km^{2})	462.2/sq mi (178.5/km^{2})
Oakley	Village	Saginaw	299	290	+3.1%	339	1.02 sq mi (2.6 km^{2})	284.3/sq mi (109.8/km^{2})
Oak Park	City	Oakland	29,560	29,319	+0.8%	29,793	5.16 sq mi (13.4 km^{2})	5,682.0/sq mi (2,193.8/km^{2})
Oceola	Township	Livingston	14,623	11,936	+22.5%	8,362	36.12 sq mi (93.6 km^{2})	330.5/sq mi (127.6/km^{2})
Ocqueoc	Township	Presque Isle	544	655	−16.9%	634	52.15 sq mi (135.1 km^{2})	12.6/sq mi (4.8/km^{2})
Odessa	Township	Ionia	3,918	3,778	+3.7%	4,036	35.58 sq mi (92.2 km^{2})	106.2/sq mi (41.0/km^{2})
Ogden	Township	Lenawee	913	973	−6.2%	1,063	42.11 sq mi (109.1 km^{2})	23.1/sq mi (8.9/km^{2})
Ogemaw	Township	Ogemaw	1,154	1,223	−5.6%	1,118	36.3 sq mi (94 km^{2})	33.7/sq mi (13.0/km^{2})
Olive	Township	Clinton	2,535	2,476	+2.4%	2,322	35.63 sq mi (92.3 km^{2})	69.5/sq mi (26.8/km^{2})
Olive	Township	Ottawa	5,007	4,735	+5.7%	4,691	36.18 sq mi (93.7 km^{2})	130.9/sq mi (50.5/km^{2})
Oliver	Township	Huron	1,419	1,483	−4.3%	1,626	35.31 sq mi (91.5 km^{2})	42.0/sq mi (16.2/km^{2})
Oliver	Township	Kalkaska	292	281	+3.9%	263	35.73 sq mi (92.5 km^{2})	7.9/sq mi (3.0/km^{2})
Olivet	City	Eaton	1,517	1,605	−5.5%	1,758	1.02 sq mi (2.6 km^{2})	1,573.5/sq mi (607.5/km^{2})
Omer	City	Arenac	274	313	−12.5%	337	1.13 sq mi (2.9 km^{2})	277.0/sq mi (106.9/km^{2})
Onaway	City	Presque Isle	890	880	+1.1%	993	1.57 sq mi (4.1 km^{2})	560.5/sq mi (216.4/km^{2})
Oneida	Charter township	Eaton	3,986	3,865	+3.1%	3,703	32.56 sq mi (84.3 km^{2})	118.7/sq mi (45.8/km^{2})
Onekama	Village	Manistee	399	411	−2.9%	647	0.58 sq mi (1.5 km^{2})	708.6/sq mi (273.6/km^{2})
Onekama	Township	Manistee	1,338	1,329	+0.7%	1,514	18.42 sq mi (47.7 km^{2})	72.1/sq mi (27.9/km^{2})
Onondaga	Township	Ingham	2,997	3,158	−5.1%	2,958	36.11 sq mi (93.5 km^{2})	87.5/sq mi (33.8/km^{2})
Onota	Township	Alger	371	352	+5.4%	310	87.73 sq mi (227.2 km^{2})	4.0/sq mi (1.5/km^{2})
Onsted	Village	Lenawee	988	917	+7.7%	813	0.96 sq mi (2.5 km^{2})	955.2/sq mi (368.8/km^{2})
Ontonagon†	Village	Ontonagon	1,285	1,494	−14.0%	1,769	3.71 sq mi (9.6 km^{2})	402.7/sq mi (155.5/km^{2})
Ontonagon	Township	Ontonagon	2,253	2,579	−12.6%	2,954	192.88 sq mi (499.6 km^{2})	13.4/sq mi (5.2/km^{2})
Ontwa	Township	Cass	6,904	6,549	+5.4%	5,865	19.41 sq mi (50.3 km^{2})	337.4/sq mi (130.3/km^{2})
Orange	Township	Ionia	1,012	987	+2.5%	1,040	35.93 sq mi (93.1 km^{2})	27.5/sq mi (10.6/km^{2})
Orange	Township	Kalkaska	1,250	1,233	+1.4%	1,176	34.23 sq mi (88.7 km^{2})	36.0/sq mi (13.9/km^{2})
Orangeville	Township	Barry	3,398	3,311	+2.6%	3,321	33.43 sq mi (86.6 km^{2})	99.0/sq mi (38.2/km^{2})
Orchard Lake Village	City	Oakland	2,238	2,375	−5.8%	2,215	2.44 sq mi (6.3 km^{2})	973.4/sq mi (375.8/km^{2})
Oregon	Township	Lapeer	5,712	5,786	−1.3%	6,166	32.55 sq mi (84.3 km^{2})	177.8/sq mi (68.6/km^{2})
Orient	Township	Osceola	733	773	−5.2%	803	34.8 sq mi (90 km^{2})	22.2/sq mi (8.6/km^{2})
Orion	Charter township	Oakland	38,206	35,394	+7.9%	33,463	33.33 sq mi (86.3 km^{2})	1,061.9/sq mi (410.0/km^{2})
Orleans	Township	Ionia	2,664	2,743	−2.9%	2,736	35.17 sq mi (91.1 km^{2})	78.0/sq mi (30.1/km^{2})
Oronoko	Charter township	Berrien	9,226	9,193	+0.4%	9,843	32.33 sq mi (83.7 km^{2})	284.3/sq mi (109.8/km^{2})
Ortonville	Village	Oakland	1,376	1,442	−4.6%	1,535	0.98 sq mi (2.5 km^{2})	1,471.4/sq mi (568.1/km^{2})
Osceola	Township	Houghton	1,822	1,888	−3.5%	1,908	24.82 sq mi (64.3 km^{2})	76.1/sq mi (29.4/km^{2})
Osceola	Township	Osceola	943	1,076	−12.4%	1,118	34.23 sq mi (88.7 km^{2})	31.4/sq mi (12.1/km^{2})
Oscoda	Charter township	Iosco	7,152	6,997	+2.2%	7,248	121.99 sq mi (316.0 km^{2})	57.4/sq mi (22.1/km^{2})
Oshtemo	Charter township	Kalamazoo	23,747	21,705	+9.4%	17,003	35.87 sq mi (92.9 km^{2})	605.1/sq mi (233.6/km^{2})
Ossineke	Township	Alpena	1,635	1,675	−2.4%	1,761	105.74 sq mi (273.9 km^{2})	15.8/sq mi (6.1/km^{2})
Otisco	Township	Ionia	2,268	2,282	−0.6%	2,243	30.97 sq mi (80.2 km^{2})	73.7/sq mi (28.4/km^{2})
Otisville	Village	Genesee	819	864	−5.2%	882	0.88 sq mi (2.3 km^{2})	981.8/sq mi (379.1/km^{2})
Otsego	City	Allegan	4,120	3,956	+4.1%	3,933	2.07 sq mi (5.4 km^{2})	1,911.1/sq mi (737.9/km^{2})
Otsego	Township	Allegan	5,903	5,594	+5.5%	4,854	33.23 sq mi (86.1 km^{2})	168.3/sq mi (65.0/km^{2})
Otsego Lake	Township	Otsego	2,857	2,847	+0.4%	2,532	32.72 sq mi (84.7 km^{2})	87.0/sq mi (33.6/km^{2})
Otter Lake	Village	Lapeer, Genesee	426	389	+9.5%	437	0.76 sq mi (2.0 km^{2})	511.8/sq mi (197.6/km^{2})
Otto	Township	Oceana	858	826	+3.9%	662	33.46 sq mi (86.7 km^{2})	24.7/sq mi (9.5/km^{2})
Overisel	Township	Allegan	3,133	2,911	+7.6%	2,594	35.65 sq mi (92.3 km^{2})	81.7/sq mi (31.5/km^{2})
Ovid	Township	Branch	2,161	2,326	−7.1%	2,432	33.18 sq mi (85.9 km^{2})	70.1/sq mi (27.1/km^{2})
Ovid	City	Clinton, Shiawassee	1,481	1,603	−7.6%	1,514	0.92 sq mi (2.4 km^{2})	1,742.4/sq mi (672.7/km^{2})
Ovid	Township	Clinton	2,188	3,795	−42.3%	3,490	35.84 sq mi (92.8 km^{2})	105.9/sq mi (40.9/km^{2})
Owendale	Village	Huron	275	241	+14.1%	296	0.74 sq mi (1.9 km^{2})	325.7/sq mi (125.7/km^{2})
Owosso	City	Shiawassee	14,714	15,194	−3.2%	15,713	5.23 sq mi (13.5 km^{2})	2,905.2/sq mi (1,121.7/km^{2})
Owosso	Charter township	Shiawassee	4,765	4,821	−1.2%	4,670	31.61 sq mi (81.9 km^{2})	152.5/sq mi (58.9/km^{2})
Oxford	Village	Oakland	3,492	3,436	+1.6%	3,540	1.25 sq mi (3.2 km^{2})	2,748.8/sq mi (1,061.3/km^{2})
Oxford	Charter township	Oakland	22,419	20,526	+9.2%	16,025	33.78 sq mi (87.5 km^{2})	607.6/sq mi (234.6/km^{2})
Palmyra	Township	Lenawee	2,031	2,084	−2.5%	2,366	36.5 sq mi (95 km^{2})	57.1/sq mi (22.0/km^{2})
Paradise	Township	Grand Traverse	4,952	4,713	+5.1%	4,191	52.87 sq mi (136.9 km^{2})	89.1/sq mi (34.4/km^{2})
Parchment	City	Kalamazoo	1,926	1,804	+6.8%	1,936	0.92 sq mi (2.4 km^{2})	1,960.9/sq mi (757.1/km^{2})
Paris	Township	Huron	491	481	+2.1%	557	36.01 sq mi (93.3 km^{2})	13.4/sq mi (5.2/km^{2})
Park	Township	Ottawa	18,625	17,802	+4.6%	17,579	19.2 sq mi (50 km^{2})	927.2/sq mi (358.0/km^{2})
Park	Township	St. Joseph	2,397	2,600	−7.8%	2,699	34.95 sq mi (90.5 km^{2})	74.4/sq mi (28.7/km^{2})
Parma	Village	Jackson	780	769	+1.4%	907	1.06 sq mi (2.7 km^{2})	725.5/sq mi (280.1/km^{2})
Parma	Township	Jackson	2,668	2,726	−2.1%	2,696	36.3 sq mi (94 km^{2})	75.1/sq mi (29.0/km^{2})
Pavilion	Charter township	Kalamazoo	6,387	6,222	+2.7%	5,829	35.01 sq mi (90.7 km^{2})	177.7/sq mi (68.6/km^{2})
Paw Paw†	Village	Van Buren	3,323	3,534	−6.0%	3,363	2.67 sq mi (6.9 km^{2})	1,323.6/sq mi (511.0/km^{2})
Paw Paw	Township	Van Buren	6,881	7,041	−2.3%	7,091	34.91 sq mi (90.4 km^{2})	201.7/sq mi (77.9/km^{2})
Peacock	Township	Lake	398	492	−19.1%	445	34.92 sq mi (90.4 km^{2})	14.1/sq mi (5.4/km^{2})
Peaine	Township	Charlevoix	266	292	−8.9%	244	52.35 sq mi (135.6 km^{2})	5.6/sq mi (2.2/km^{2})
Peck	Village	Sanilac	593	632	−6.2%	599	1.05 sq mi (2.7 km^{2})	601.9/sq mi (232.4/km^{2})
Pellston	Village	Emmet	774	822	−5.8%	771	1.91 sq mi (4.9 km^{2})	430.4/sq mi (166.2/km^{2})
Peninsula	Township	Grand Traverse	6,068	5,433	+11.7%	5,265	27.89 sq mi (72.2 km^{2})	194.8/sq mi (75.2/km^{2})
Penn	Township	Cass	1,755	1,774	−1.1%	1,902	33.56 sq mi (86.9 km^{2})	52.9/sq mi (20.4/km^{2})
Pennfield	Charter township	Calhoun	8,781	9,001	−2.4%	8,913	34.27 sq mi (88.8 km^{2})	262.6/sq mi (101.4/km^{2})
Pentland	Township	Luce	1,564	2,674	−41.5%	1,788	106.79 sq mi (276.6 km^{2})	25.0/sq mi (9.7/km^{2})
Pentwater	Village	Oceana	890	857	+3.9%	958	1.28 sq mi (3.3 km^{2})	669.5/sq mi (258.5/km^{2})
Pentwater	Township	Oceana	1,652	1,515	+9.0%	1,513	12.86 sq mi (33.3 km^{2})	117.8/sq mi (45.5/km^{2})
Pere Marquette	Charter township	Mason	2,416	2,366	+2.1%	2,228	14.09 sq mi (36.5 km^{2})	167.9/sq mi (64.8/km^{2})
Perrinton	Village	Gratiot	393	406	−3.2%	439	0.63 sq mi (1.6 km^{2})	644.4/sq mi (248.8/km^{2})
Perry	City	Shiawassee	2,091	2,188	−4.4%	2,065	2.92 sq mi (7.6 km^{2})	749.3/sq mi (289.3/km^{2})
Perry	Township	Shiawassee	4,141	4,327	−4.3%	4,438	31.14 sq mi (80.7 km^{2})	139.0/sq mi (53.7/km^{2})
Petersburg	City	Monroe	1,171	1,146	+2.2%	1,157	0.48 sq mi (1.2 km^{2})	2,387.5/sq mi (921.8/km^{2})
Petoskey†	City	Emmet	5,877	5,670	+3.7%	6,080	5.09 sq mi (13.2 km^{2})	1,113.9/sq mi (430.1/km^{2})
Pewamo	Village	Ionia	503	469	+7.2%	560	1 sq mi (2.6 km^{2})	469.0/sq mi (181.1/km^{2})
Pickford	Township	Chippewa	2,791	1,595	+75.0%	1,584	108.26 sq mi (280.4 km^{2})	14.7/sq mi (5.7/km^{2})
Pierson	Village	Montcalm	229	172	+33.1%	185	0.25 sq mi (0.65 km^{2})	688.0/sq mi (265.6/km^{2})
Pierson	Township	Montcalm	3,363	3,216	+4.6%	2,866	34.64 sq mi (89.7 km^{2})	92.8/sq mi (35.8/km^{2})
Pigeon	Village	Huron	1,222	1,208	+1.2%	1,207	0.86 sq mi (2.2 km^{2})	1,404.7/sq mi (542.3/km^{2})
Pinckney	Village	Livingston	2,415	2,427	−0.5%	2,141	1.6 sq mi (4.1 km^{2})	1,516.9/sq mi (585.7/km^{2})
Pinconning	City	Bay	1,204	1,307	−7.9%	1,386	0.85 sq mi (2.2 km^{2})	1,537.6/sq mi (593.7/km^{2})
Pinconning	Township	Bay	2,299	2,431	−5.4%	2,608	36.68 sq mi (95.0 km^{2})	66.3/sq mi (25.6/km^{2})
Pine	Township	Montcalm	1,870	1,834	+2.0%	1,654	34.98 sq mi (90.6 km^{2})	52.4/sq mi (20.2/km^{2})
Pine Grove	Township	Van Buren	2,994	2,949	+1.5%	2,773	34.45 sq mi (89.2 km^{2})	85.6/sq mi (33.1/km^{2})
Pine River	Township	Gratiot	2,348	2,279	+3.0%	2,451	30.31 sq mi (78.5 km^{2})	75.2/sq mi (29.0/km^{2})
Pinora	Township	Lake	757	717	+5.6%	643	35.47 sq mi (91.9 km^{2})	20.2/sq mi (7.8/km^{2})
Pioneer	Township	Missaukee	508	451	+12.6%	460	35.91 sq mi (93.0 km^{2})	12.6/sq mi (4.8/km^{2})
Pipestone	Township	Berrien	2,177	2,312	−5.8%	2,474	35.51 sq mi (92.0 km^{2})	65.1/sq mi (25.1/km^{2})
Pittsfield	Charter township	Washtenaw	39,147	34,663	+12.9%	30,167	27.26 sq mi (70.6 km^{2})	1,271.6/sq mi (491.0/km^{2})
Pittsford	Township	Hillsdale	1,538	1,603	−4.1%	1,600	35.42 sq mi (91.7 km^{2})	45.3/sq mi (17.5/km^{2})
Plainfield	Township	Iosco	3,350	3,799	−11.8%	4,292	103.73 sq mi (268.7 km^{2})	36.6/sq mi (14.1/km^{2})
Plainfield	Charter township	Kent	33,535	30,952	+8.3%	30,195	35.04 sq mi (90.8 km^{2})	883.3/sq mi (341.1/km^{2})
Plainwell	City	Allegan	3,788	3,804	−0.4%	3,933	1.97 sq mi (5.1 km^{2})	1,931.0/sq mi (745.5/km^{2})
Platte	Township	Benzie	343	354	−3.1%	342	36.3 sq mi (94 km^{2})	9.8/sq mi (3.8/km^{2})
Pleasanton	Township	Manistee	870	818	+6.4%	817	33.55 sq mi (86.9 km^{2})	24.4/sq mi (9.4/km^{2})
Pleasant Plains	Township	Lake	1,603	1,581	+1.4%	1,535	34.73 sq mi (90.0 km^{2})	45.5/sq mi (17.6/km^{2})
Pleasant Ridge	City	Oakland	2,627	2,526	+4.0%	2,594	0.57 sq mi (1.5 km^{2})	4,431.6/sq mi (1,711.0/km^{2})
Pleasantview	Township	Emmet	918	823	+11.5%	943	35.6 sq mi (92 km^{2})	23.1/sq mi (8.9/km^{2})
Plymouth	City	Wayne	9,370	9,132	+2.6%	9,022	2.21 sq mi (5.7 km^{2})	4,132.1/sq mi (1,595.4/km^{2})
Plymouth	Charter township	Wayne	27,938	27,524	+1.5%	27,798	15.93 sq mi (41.3 km^{2})	1,727.8/sq mi (667.1/km^{2})
Pointe Aux Barques	Township	Huron	15	10	+50.0%	10	1.31 sq mi (3.4 km^{2})	7.6/sq mi (2.9/km^{2})
Pokagon	Township	Cass	2,119	2,029	+4.4%	2,199	34 sq mi (88 km^{2})	59.7/sq mi (23.0/km^{2})
Polkton	Charter township	Ottawa	2,565	2,423	+5.9%	2,335	39.21 sq mi (101.6 km^{2})	61.8/sq mi (23.9/km^{2})
Pontiac†	City	Oakland	61,606	59,515	+3.5%	66,337	19.97 sq mi (51.7 km^{2})	2,980.2/sq mi (1,150.7/km^{2})
Portage	Charter township	Houghton	3,189	3,221	−1.0%	3,156	112.09 sq mi (290.3 km^{2})	28.7/sq mi (11.1/km^{2})
Portage	City	Kalamazoo	48,891	46,292	+5.6%	44,897	32.22 sq mi (83.4 km^{2})	1,436.7/sq mi (554.7/km^{2})
Portage	Township	Mackinac	907	981	−7.5%	1,055	55.43 sq mi (143.6 km^{2})	17.7/sq mi (6.8/km^{2})
Port Austin	Village	Huron	622	664	−6.3%	737	1.03 sq mi (2.7 km^{2})	644.7/sq mi (248.9/km^{2})
Port Austin	Township	Huron	1,384	1,424	−2.8%	1,591	16.3 sq mi (42 km^{2})	87.4/sq mi (33.7/km^{2})
Porter	Township	Cass	3,750	3,798	−1.3%	3,794	51.52 sq mi (133.4 km^{2})	73.7/sq mi (28.5/km^{2})
Porter	Township	Midland	1,270	1,277	−0.5%	1,270	35.17 sq mi (91.1 km^{2})	36.3/sq mi (14.0/km^{2})
Porter	Township	Van Buren	2,568	2,466	+4.1%	2,406	33.15 sq mi (85.9 km^{2})	74.4/sq mi (28.7/km^{2})
Port Hope	Village	Huron	293	267	+9.7%	310	1.01 sq mi (2.6 km^{2})	264.4/sq mi (102.1/km^{2})
Port Huron†	City	St. Clair	28,983	30,184	−4.0%	32,338	8.08 sq mi (20.9 km^{2})	3,735.6/sq mi (1,442.3/km^{2})
Port Huron	Charter township	St. Clair	10,792	10,654	+1.3%	8,615	12.84 sq mi (33.3 km^{2})	829.8/sq mi (320.4/km^{2})
Portland	City	Ionia	3,796	3,883	−2.2%	3,789	2.64 sq mi (6.8 km^{2})	1,470.8/sq mi (567.9/km^{2})
Portland	Township	Ionia	3,881	3,404	+14.0%	2,460	32.18 sq mi (83.3 km^{2})	105.8/sq mi (40.8/km^{2})
Port Sanilac	Village	Sanilac	567	623	−9.0%	658	0.8 sq mi (2.1 km^{2})	778.8/sq mi (300.7/km^{2})
Port Sheldon	Township	Ottawa	5,206	4,240	+22.8%	4,503	22.3 sq mi (58 km^{2})	190.1/sq mi (73.4/km^{2})
Portsmouth	Charter township	Bay	3,224	3,306	−2.5%	3,619	20.05 sq mi (51.9 km^{2})	164.9/sq mi (63.7/km^{2})
Posen	Village	Presque Isle	270	234	+15.4%	292	1 sq mi (2.6 km^{2})	234.0/sq mi (90.3/km^{2})
Posen	Township	Presque Isle	808	850	−4.9%	959	35.14 sq mi (91.0 km^{2})	24.2/sq mi (9.3/km^{2})
Potterville	City	Eaton	3,055	2,617	+16.7%	2,168	1.68 sq mi (4.4 km^{2})	1,557.7/sq mi (601.4/km^{2})
Powell	Township	Marquette	734	816	−10.0%	724	153.7 sq mi (398 km^{2})	5.3/sq mi (2.0/km^{2})
Powers	Village	Menominee	381	422	−9.7%	430	0.99 sq mi (2.6 km^{2})	426.3/sq mi (164.6/km^{2})
Prairie Ronde	Township	Kalamazoo	2,369	2,250	+5.3%	2,086	35.83 sq mi (92.8 km^{2})	62.8/sq mi (24.2/km^{2})
Prairieville	Township	Barry	3,334	3,404	−2.1%	3,175	32.8 sq mi (85 km^{2})	103.8/sq mi (40.1/km^{2})
Prescott	Village	Ogemaw	217	266	−18.4%	286	1.11 sq mi (2.9 km^{2})	239.6/sq mi (92.5/km^{2})
Presque Isle	Township	Presque Isle	1,698	1,656	+2.5%	1,691	35.42 sq mi (91.7 km^{2})	46.8/sq mi (18.1/km^{2})
Pulaski	Township	Jackson	1,883	2,075	−9.3%	1,931	36.18 sq mi (93.7 km^{2})	57.4/sq mi (22.1/km^{2})
Pulawski	Township	Presque Isle	372	343	+8.5%	372	41.84 sq mi (108.4 km^{2})	8.2/sq mi (3.2/km^{2})
Putnam	Township	Livingston	7,890	8,248	−4.3%	7,500	34.09 sq mi (88.3 km^{2})	241.9/sq mi (93.4/km^{2})
Quincy	Village	Branch	1,554	1,652	−5.9%	1,701	1.22 sq mi (3.2 km^{2})	1,354.1/sq mi (522.8/km^{2})
Quincy	Township	Branch	4,108	4,285	−4.1%	4,411	35.23 sq mi (91.2 km^{2})	121.6/sq mi (47.0/km^{2})
Quincy	Township	Houghton	375	270	+38.9%	251	3.82 sq mi (9.9 km^{2})	70.7/sq mi (27.3/km^{2})
Raber	Township	Chippewa	632	647	−2.3%	670	97.81 sq mi (253.3 km^{2})	6.6/sq mi (2.6/km^{2})
Raisin	Charter township	Lenawee	7,900	7,559	+4.5%	6,507	36.13 sq mi (93.6 km^{2})	209.2/sq mi (80.8/km^{2})
Raisinville	Township	Monroe	5,903	5,816	+1.5%	4,896	48.14 sq mi (124.7 km^{2})	120.8/sq mi (46.6/km^{2})
Ransom	Township	Hillsdale	808	932	−13.3%	982	30.08 sq mi (77.9 km^{2})	31.0/sq mi (12.0/km^{2})
Rapid River	Township	Kalkaska	1,245	1,145	+8.7%	1,005	35.13 sq mi (91.0 km^{2})	32.6/sq mi (12.6/km^{2})
Ravenna	Village	Muskegon	1,308	1,219	+7.3%	1,206	1.21 sq mi (3.1 km^{2})	1,007.4/sq mi (389.0/km^{2})
Ravenna	Township	Muskegon	2,962	2,905	+2.0%	2,856	36.17 sq mi (93.7 km^{2})	80.3/sq mi (31.0/km^{2})
Ray	Township	Macomb	3,780	3,739	+1.1%	3,740	36.58 sq mi (94.7 km^{2})	102.2/sq mi (39.5/km^{2})
Reading	City	Hillsdale	1,094	1,078	+1.5%	1,134	1.01 sq mi (2.6 km^{2})	1,067.3/sq mi (412.1/km^{2})
Reading	Township	Hillsdale	1,732	1,765	−1.9%	1,781	33.98 sq mi (88.0 km^{2})	51.9/sq mi (20.1/km^{2})
Readmond	Township	Emmet	560	581	−3.6%	493	31.03 sq mi (80.4 km^{2})	18.7/sq mi (7.2/km^{2})
Redding	Township	Clare	459	526	−12.7%	526	34.9 sq mi (90 km^{2})	15.1/sq mi (5.8/km^{2})
Redford	Charter township	Wayne	49,504	48,362	+2.4%	51,622	11.24 sq mi (29.1 km^{2})	4,302.7/sq mi (1,661.3/km^{2})
Reed City†	City	Osceola	2,490	2,425	+2.7%	2,490	2.08 sq mi (5.4 km^{2})	1,165.9/sq mi (450.1/km^{2})
Reeder	Township	Missaukee	1,199	1,128	+6.3%	1,112	34.78 sq mi (90.1 km^{2})	32.4/sq mi (12.5/km^{2})
Reese	Village	Tuscola, Saginaw	1,261	1,454	−13.3%	1,375	1.35 sq mi (3.5 km^{2})	1,077.0/sq mi (415.8/km^{2})
Reno	Township	Iosco	632	590	+7.1%	656	35.27 sq mi (91.3 km^{2})	16.7/sq mi (6.5/km^{2})
Republic	Township	Marquette	994	1,060	−6.2%	1,106	111.37 sq mi (288.4 km^{2})	9.5/sq mi (3.7/km^{2})
Resort	Township	Emmet	2,835	2,697	+5.1%	2,479	19.13 sq mi (49.5 km^{2})	141.0/sq mi (54.4/km^{2})
Reynolds	Township	Montcalm	5,431	5,310	+2.3%	4,279	35.69 sq mi (92.4 km^{2})	148.8/sq mi (57.4/km^{2})
Rich	Township	Lapeer	1,500	1,623	−7.6%	1,412	34.98 sq mi (90.6 km^{2})	46.4/sq mi (17.9/km^{2})
Richfield	Township	Genesee	8,991	8,730	+3.0%	8,170	35.06 sq mi (90.8 km^{2})	249.0/sq mi (96.1/km^{2})
Richfield	Township	Roscommon	3,545	3,731	−5.0%	4,139	68.98 sq mi (178.7 km^{2})	54.1/sq mi (20.9/km^{2})
Richland	Village	Kalamazoo	946	751	+26.0%	593	1.01 sq mi (2.6 km^{2})	743.6/sq mi (287.1/km^{2})
Richland	Township	Kalamazoo	8,693	7,580	+14.7%	6,491	34.43 sq mi (89.2 km^{2})	220.2/sq mi (85.0/km^{2})
Richland	Township	Missaukee	1,489	1,491	−0.1%	1,445	35.52 sq mi (92.0 km^{2})	42.0/sq mi (16.2/km^{2})
Richland	Township	Montcalm	2,646	2,778	−4.8%	2,868	35.63 sq mi (92.3 km^{2})	78.0/sq mi (30.1/km^{2})
Richland	Township	Ogemaw	827	914	−9.5%	956	34.78 sq mi (90.1 km^{2})	26.3/sq mi (10.1/km^{2})
Richland	Township	Saginaw	3,955	4,144	−4.6%	4,281	36.71 sq mi (95.1 km^{2})	112.9/sq mi (43.6/km^{2})
Richmond	City	Macomb, St. Clair	5,878	5,735	+2.5%	4,897	2.85 sq mi (7.4 km^{2})	2,012.3/sq mi (776.9/km^{2})
Richmond	Township	Macomb	3,544	3,665	−3.3%	3,416	37.49 sq mi (97.1 km^{2})	97.8/sq mi (37.7/km^{2})
Richmond	Township	Marquette	806	882	−8.6%	974	55.57 sq mi (143.9 km^{2})	15.9/sq mi (6.1/km^{2})
Richmond	Township	Osceola	1,657	1,554	+6.6%	1,695	32.89 sq mi (85.2 km^{2})	47.2/sq mi (18.2/km^{2})
Ridgeway	Township	Lenawee	1,535	1,542	−0.5%	1,580	28.65 sq mi (74.2 km^{2})	53.8/sq mi (20.8/km^{2})
Riga	Township	Lenawee	1,286	1,406	−8.5%	1,439	40.86 sq mi (105.8 km^{2})	34.4/sq mi (13.3/km^{2})
Riley	Township	Clinton	2,020	2,024	−0.2%	1,767	35.71 sq mi (92.5 km^{2})	56.7/sq mi (21.9/km^{2})
Riley	Township	St. Clair	3,199	3,353	−4.6%	3,046	38.23 sq mi (99.0 km^{2})	87.7/sq mi (33.9/km^{2})
River Rouge	City	Wayne	7,224	7,903	−8.6%	9,917	2.65 sq mi (6.9 km^{2})	2,982.3/sq mi (1,151.5/km^{2})
Riverside	Township	Missaukee	1,124	1,179	−4.7%	1,050	35.35 sq mi (91.6 km^{2})	33.4/sq mi (12.9/km^{2})
Riverton	Township	Mason	1,232	1,153	+6.9%	1,335	35.27 sq mi (91.3 km^{2})	32.7/sq mi (12.6/km^{2})
Riverview	City	Wayne	12,490	12,486	0.0%	13,272	4.4 sq mi (11 km^{2})	2,837.7/sq mi (1,095.7/km^{2})
Rives	Township	Jackson	4,750	4,683	+1.4%	4,725	35.79 sq mi (92.7 km^{2})	130.8/sq mi (50.5/km^{2})
Robinson	Township	Ottawa	6,382	6,084	+4.9%	5,588	38.47 sq mi (99.6 km^{2})	158.1/sq mi (61.1/km^{2})
Rochester	City	Oakland	13,035	12,711	+2.5%	10,467	3.82 sq mi (9.9 km^{2})	3,327.5/sq mi (1,284.7/km^{2})
Rochester Hills	City	Oakland	76,300	70,995	+7.5%	68,825	32.82 sq mi (85.0 km^{2})	2,163.2/sq mi (835.2/km^{2})
Rockford	City	Kent	6,142	5,719	+7.4%	4,626	3.24 sq mi (8.4 km^{2})	1,765.1/sq mi (681.5/km^{2})
Rockland	Township	Ontonagon	226	228	−0.9%	324	92.75 sq mi (240.2 km^{2})	2.5/sq mi (0.9/km^{2})
Rock River	Township	Alger	1,231	1,212	+1.6%	1,213	80.74 sq mi (209.1 km^{2})	15.0/sq mi (5.8/km^{2})
Rockwood	City	Wayne	3,240	3,289	−1.5%	3,442	2.52 sq mi (6.5 km^{2})	1,305.2/sq mi (503.9/km^{2})
Rogers	Township	Presque Isle	964	984	−2.0%	949	33.61 sq mi (87.0 km^{2})	29.3/sq mi (11.3/km^{2})
Rogers City†	City	Presque Isle	2,850	2,827	+0.8%	3,322	4.52 sq mi (11.7 km^{2})	625.4/sq mi (241.5/km^{2})
Rolland	Township	Isabella	1,406	1,305	+7.7%	1,210	35.76 sq mi (92.6 km^{2})	36.5/sq mi (14.1/km^{2})
Rollin	Township	Lenawee	3,035	3,270	−7.2%	3,176	33.68 sq mi (87.2 km^{2})	97.1/sq mi (37.5/km^{2})
Rome	Township	Lenawee	1,824	1,791	+1.8%	1,772	35.86 sq mi (92.9 km^{2})	49.9/sq mi (19.3/km^{2})
Romeo	Village	Macomb	3,767	3,596	+4.8%	3,721	2.02 sq mi (5.2 km^{2})	1,780.2/sq mi (687.3/km^{2})
Romulus	City	Wayne	25,178	23,989	+5.0%	22,979	35.61 sq mi (92.2 km^{2})	673.7/sq mi (260.1/km^{2})
Ronald	Township	Ionia	1,861	1,869	−0.4%	1,903	36.18 sq mi (93.7 km^{2})	51.7/sq mi (19.9/km^{2})
Roosevelt Park	City	Muskegon	4,172	3,831	+8.9%	3,890	1.03 sq mi (2.7 km^{2})	3,719.4/sq mi (1,436.1/km^{2})
Roscommon†	Village	Roscommon	981	1,075	−8.7%	1,133	1.49 sq mi (3.9 km^{2})	721.5/sq mi (278.6/km^{2})
Roscommon	Township	Roscommon	4,397	4,411	−0.3%	4,249	103.32 sq mi (267.6 km^{2})	42.7/sq mi (16.5/km^{2})
Rose	Township	Oakland	6,188	6,250	−1.0%	6,210	34.51 sq mi (89.4 km^{2})	181.1/sq mi (69.9/km^{2})
Rose	Township	Ogemaw	1,241	1,368	−9.3%	1,409	52.86 sq mi (136.9 km^{2})	25.9/sq mi (10.0/km^{2})
Rosebush	Village	Isabella	353	368	−4.1%	379	0.89 sq mi (2.3 km^{2})	413.5/sq mi (159.6/km^{2})
Rose City	City	Ogemaw	577	653	−11.6%	721	1.08 sq mi (2.8 km^{2})	604.6/sq mi (233.4/km^{2})
Rose Lake	Township	Osceola	1,406	1,373	+2.4%	1,231	33.61 sq mi (87.0 km^{2})	40.9/sq mi (15.8/km^{2})
Roseville	City	Macomb	47,710	47,299	+0.9%	48,129	9.83 sq mi (25.5 km^{2})	4,811.7/sq mi (1,857.8/km^{2})
Ross	Township	Kalamazoo	4,851	4,664	+4.0%	5,047	33.34 sq mi (86.4 km^{2})	139.9/sq mi (54.0/km^{2})
Rothbury	Village	Oceana	462	432	+6.9%	416	0.9 sq mi (2.3 km^{2})	480.0/sq mi (185.3/km^{2})
Roxand	Township	Eaton	1,748	1,848	−5.4%	1,903	36.42 sq mi (94.3 km^{2})	50.7/sq mi (19.6/km^{2})
Royal Oak	City	Oakland	58,211	57,236	+1.7%	60,062	11.78 sq mi (30.5 km^{2})	4,858.7/sq mi (1,876.0/km^{2})
Royal Oak	Charter township	Oakland	2,374	2,419	−1.9%	5,446	0.55 sq mi (1.4 km^{2})	4,398.2/sq mi (1,698.1/km^{2})
Royalton	Township	Berrien	5,141	4,766	+7.9%	3,888	18.12 sq mi (46.9 km^{2})	263.0/sq mi (101.6/km^{2})
Rubicon	Township	Huron	705	732	−3.7%	778	23.69 sq mi (61.4 km^{2})	30.9/sq mi (11.9/km^{2})
Rudyard	Township	Chippewa	1,289	1,370	−5.9%	1,315	89.64 sq mi (232.2 km^{2})	15.3/sq mi (5.9/km^{2})
Rush	Township	Shiawassee	1,268	1,291	−1.8%	1,409	34.9 sq mi (90 km^{2})	37.0/sq mi (14.3/km^{2})
Rust	Township	Montmorency	519	561	−7.5%	549	68.52 sq mi (177.5 km^{2})	8.2/sq mi (3.2/km^{2})
Rutland	Charter township	Barry	4,136	3,987	+3.7%	3,646	35.03 sq mi (90.7 km^{2})	113.8/sq mi (43.9/km^{2})
Sage	Township	Gladwin	2,431	2,457	−1.1%	2,617	34.23 sq mi (88.7 km^{2})	71.8/sq mi (27.7/km^{2})
Saginaw†	City	Saginaw	44,202	51,508	−14.2%	61,799	17.34 sq mi (44.9 km^{2})	2,970.5/sq mi (1,146.9/km^{2})
Saginaw	Charter township	Saginaw	41,679	40,840	+2.1%	39,657	24.5 sq mi (63 km^{2})	1,666.9/sq mi (643.6/km^{2})
Sagola	Township	Dickinson	1,066	1,106	−3.6%	1,169	159.71 sq mi (413.6 km^{2})	6.9/sq mi (2.7/km^{2})
St. Charles	Village	Saginaw	1,992	2,054	−3.0%	2,215	2.12 sq mi (5.5 km^{2})	968.9/sq mi (374.1/km^{2})
St. Charles	Township	Saginaw	3,183	3,330	−4.4%	3,393	36.49 sq mi (94.5 km^{2})	91.3/sq mi (35.2/km^{2})
St. Clair	City	St. Clair	5,464	5,485	−0.4%	5,802	2.93 sq mi (7.6 km^{2})	1,872.0/sq mi (722.8/km^{2})
St. Clair	Township	St. Clair	7,085	6,817	+3.9%	6,423	38.41 sq mi (99.5 km^{2})	177.5/sq mi (68.5/km^{2})
St. Clair Shores	City	Macomb	58,874	59,715	−1.4%	63,096	11.62 sq mi (30.1 km^{2})	5,139.0/sq mi (1,984.2/km^{2})
St. Ignace†	City	Mackinac	2,306	2,452	−6.0%	2,678	2.68 sq mi (6.9 km^{2})	914.9/sq mi (353.3/km^{2})
St. Ignace	Township	Mackinac	973	939	+3.6%	1,024	97.11 sq mi (251.5 km^{2})	9.7/sq mi (3.7/km^{2})
St. James	Township	Charlevoix	259	365	−29.0%	307	20.35 sq mi (52.7 km^{2})	17.9/sq mi (6.9/km^{2})
St. Johns†	City	Clinton	7,698	7,865	−2.1%	7,485	3.87 sq mi (10.0 km^{2})	2,032.3/sq mi (784.7/km^{2})
St. Joseph†	City	Berrien	7,856	8,365	−6.1%	8,789	3.21 sq mi (8.3 km^{2})	2,605.9/sq mi (1,006.2/km^{2})
St. Joseph	Charter township	Berrien	9,993	10,028	−0.3%	10,042	6.65 sq mi (17.2 km^{2})	1,508.0/sq mi (582.2/km^{2})
St. Louis	City	Gratiot	7,010	7,482	−6.3%	4,494	3.34 sq mi (8.7 km^{2})	2,240.1/sq mi (864.9/km^{2})
Salem	Township	Allegan	5,156	4,446	+16.0%	3,486	35.7 sq mi (92 km^{2})	124.5/sq mi (48.1/km^{2})
Salem	Township	Washtenaw	7,018	5,627	+24.7%	5,562	34.29 sq mi (88.8 km^{2})	164.1/sq mi (63.4/km^{2})
Saline	City	Washtenaw	8,948	8,810	+1.6%	8,034	4.26 sq mi (11.0 km^{2})	2,068.1/sq mi (798.5/km^{2})
Saline	Township	Washtenaw	2,277	1,896	+20.1%	1,302	34.69 sq mi (89.8 km^{2})	54.7/sq mi (21.1/km^{2})
Sanborn	Township	Alpena	2,084	2,116	−1.5%	2,152	43.78 sq mi (113.4 km^{2})	48.3/sq mi (18.7/km^{2})
Sand Beach	Township	Huron	1,155	1,221	−5.4%	1,470	36.36 sq mi (94.2 km^{2})	33.6/sq mi (13.0/km^{2})
Sand Lake	Village	Kent	522	500	+4.4%	492	0.71 sq mi (1.8 km^{2})	704.2/sq mi (271.9/km^{2})
Sands	Township	Marquette	2,310	2,285	+1.1%	2,127	66.4 sq mi (172 km^{2})	34.4/sq mi (13.3/km^{2})
Sandstone	Charter township	Jackson	3,927	3,984	−1.4%	3,801	36 sq mi (93 km^{2})	110.7/sq mi (42.7/km^{2})
Sandusky†	City	Sanilac	2,709	2,679	+1.1%	2,745	2.14 sq mi (5.5 km^{2})	1,251.9/sq mi (483.3/km^{2})
Sanford	Village	Midland	813	859	−5.4%	943	1.27 sq mi (3.3 km^{2})	676.4/sq mi (261.2/km^{2})
Sanilac	Township	Sanilac	2,301	2,431	−5.3%	2,609	40.77 sq mi (105.6 km^{2})	59.6/sq mi (23.0/km^{2})
Saranac	Village	Ionia	1,376	1,325	+3.8%	1,326	1.15 sq mi (3.0 km^{2})	1,152.2/sq mi (444.9/km^{2})
Sauble	Township	Lake	373	333	+12.0%	323	34.63 sq mi (89.7 km^{2})	9.6/sq mi (3.7/km^{2})
Saugatuck	City	Allegan	865	925	−6.5%	1,065	1.18 sq mi (3.1 km^{2})	783.9/sq mi (302.7/km^{2})
Saugatuck	Township	Allegan	3,443	2,944	+16.9%	3,590	23.37 sq mi (60.5 km^{2})	126.0/sq mi (48.6/km^{2})
Sault Ste. Marie†	City	Chippewa	13,337	14,144	−5.7%	16,542	14.77 sq mi (38.3 km^{2})	957.6/sq mi (369.7/km^{2})
Schoolcraft	Township	Houghton	1,992	1,839	+8.3%	1,863	40.12 sq mi (103.9 km^{2})	45.8/sq mi (17.7/km^{2})
Schoolcraft	Village	Kalamazoo	1,466	1,525	−3.9%	1,587	0.98 sq mi (2.5 km^{2})	1,556.1/sq mi (600.8/km^{2})
Schoolcraft	Township	Kalamazoo	9,183	8,214	+11.8%	7,260	34.27 sq mi (88.8 km^{2})	239.7/sq mi (92.5/km^{2})
Scio	Township	Washtenaw	17,552	20,081	−12.6%	15,759	33.73 sq mi (87.4 km^{2})	595.3/sq mi (229.9/km^{2})
Sciota	Township	Shiawassee	1,688	1,833	−7.9%	1,801	25.13 sq mi (65.1 km^{2})	72.9/sq mi (28.2/km^{2})
Scipio	Township	Hillsdale	1,845	1,884	−2.1%	1,822	29.21 sq mi (75.7 km^{2})	64.5/sq mi (24.9/km^{2})
Scottville	City	Mason	1,356	1,214	+11.7%	1,266	1.49 sq mi (3.9 km^{2})	814.8/sq mi (314.6/km^{2})
Sebewa	Township	Ionia	1,124	1,171	−4.0%	1,202	35.94 sq mi (93.1 km^{2})	32.6/sq mi (12.6/km^{2})
Sebewaing	Village	Huron	1,721	1,759	−2.2%	1,974	1.58 sq mi (4.1 km^{2})	1,113.3/sq mi (429.8/km^{2})
Sebewaing	Township	Huron	2,678	2,724	−1.7%	2,944	32.51 sq mi (84.2 km^{2})	83.8/sq mi (32.4/km^{2})
Secord	Township	Gladwin	1,046	1,151	−9.1%	1,140	22.03 sq mi (57.1 km^{2})	52.2/sq mi (20.2/km^{2})
Selma	Township	Wexford	2,233	2,093	+6.7%	1,915	34.31 sq mi (88.9 km^{2})	61.0/sq mi (23.6/km^{2})
Seneca	Township	Lenawee	1,155	1,230	−6.1%	1,303	40.05 sq mi (103.7 km^{2})	30.7/sq mi (11.9/km^{2})
Seney	Township	Schoolcraft	115	119	−3.4%	180	212.63 sq mi (550.7 km^{2})	0.6/sq mi (0.2/km^{2})
Seville	Township	Gratiot	2,132	2,173	−1.9%	2,375	35.54 sq mi (92.0 km^{2})	61.1/sq mi (23.6/km^{2})
Sharon	Township	Washtenaw	1,817	1,737	+4.6%	1,678	37.41 sq mi (96.9 km^{2})	46.4/sq mi (17.9/km^{2})
Shelby	Charter township	Macomb	79,408	73,804	+7.6%	65,159	34.26 sq mi (88.7 km^{2})	2,154.2/sq mi (831.8/km^{2})
Shelby	Village	Oceana	1,964	2,065	−4.9%	1,914	1.7 sq mi (4.4 km^{2})	1,214.7/sq mi (469.0/km^{2})
Shelby	Township	Oceana	4,109	4,069	+1.0%	3,951	35.69 sq mi (92.4 km^{2})	114.0/sq mi (44.0/km^{2})
Shepherd	Village	Isabella	1,469	1,515	−3.0%	1,536	0.97 sq mi (2.5 km^{2})	1,561.9/sq mi (603.0/km^{2})
Sheridan	Township	Calhoun	1,809	1,936	−6.6%	2,116	31.33 sq mi (81.1 km^{2})	61.8/sq mi (23.9/km^{2})
Sheridan	Township	Clare	1,548	1,575	−1.7%	1,588	36.15 sq mi (93.6 km^{2})	43.6/sq mi (16.8/km^{2})
Sheridan	Township	Huron	627	712	−11.9%	736	36.15 sq mi (93.6 km^{2})	19.7/sq mi (7.6/km^{2})
Sheridan	Township	Mason	1,044	1,072	−2.6%	969	34.22 sq mi (88.6 km^{2})	31.3/sq mi (12.1/km^{2})
Sheridan	Township	Mecosta	1,314	1,393	−5.7%	1,357	34.8 sq mi (90 km^{2})	40.0/sq mi (15.5/km^{2})
Sheridan	Village	Montcalm	692	649	+6.6%	705	1.1 sq mi (2.8 km^{2})	590.0/sq mi (227.8/km^{2})
Sheridan	Charter township	Newaygo	2,518	2,510	+0.3%	2,423	33.04 sq mi (85.6 km^{2})	76.0/sq mi (29.3/km^{2})
Sherman	Township	Gladwin	1,001	1,043	−4.0%	1,029	34.87 sq mi (90.3 km^{2})	29.9/sq mi (11.5/km^{2})
Sherman	Township	Huron	999	1,083	−7.8%	1,165	43.99 sq mi (113.9 km^{2})	24.6/sq mi (9.5/km^{2})
Sherman	Township	Iosco	431	448	−3.8%	493	35.93 sq mi (93.1 km^{2})	12.5/sq mi (4.8/km^{2})
Sherman	Township	Isabella	3,127	2,991	+4.5%	2,616	34.71 sq mi (89.9 km^{2})	86.2/sq mi (33.3/km^{2})
Sherman	Township	Keweenaw	91	67	+35.8%	60	65.16 sq mi (168.8 km^{2})	1.0/sq mi (0.4/km^{2})
Sherman	Township	Mason	1,127	1,186	−5.0%	1,090	36.23 sq mi (93.8 km^{2})	32.7/sq mi (12.6/km^{2})
Sherman	Township	Newaygo	2,105	2,109	−0.2%	2,159	33.41 sq mi (86.5 km^{2})	63.1/sq mi (24.4/km^{2})
Sherman	Township	Osceola	991	1,042	−4.9%	1,081	37.03 sq mi (95.9 km^{2})	28.1/sq mi (10.9/km^{2})
Sherman	Township	St. Joseph	3,444	3,205	+7.5%	3,248	32.97 sq mi (85.4 km^{2})	97.2/sq mi (37.5/km^{2})
Sherwood	Village	Branch	285	309	−7.8%	324	0.98 sq mi (2.5 km^{2})	315.3/sq mi (121.7/km^{2})
Sherwood	Township	Branch	1,959	2,094	−6.4%	2,284	34.64 sq mi (89.7 km^{2})	60.5/sq mi (23.3/km^{2})
Shiawassee	Township	Shiawassee	2,740	2,840	−3.5%	2,907	36.39 sq mi (94.2 km^{2})	78.0/sq mi (30.1/km^{2})
Shoreham	Village	Berrien	844	862	−2.1%	860	0.58 sq mi (1.5 km^{2})	1,486.2/sq mi (573.8/km^{2})
Sidney	Township	Montcalm	2,538	2,574	−1.4%	2,563	33.95 sq mi (87.9 km^{2})	75.8/sq mi (29.3/km^{2})
Sigel	Township	Huron	437	465	−6.0%	576	35.64 sq mi (92.3 km^{2})	13.0/sq mi (5.0/km^{2})
Silver Creek	Township	Cass	3,051	3,218	−5.2%	3,491	31.96 sq mi (82.8 km^{2})	100.7/sq mi (38.9/km^{2})
Sims	Township	Arenac	986	1,095	−10.0%	1,091	11.5 sq mi (30 km^{2})	95.2/sq mi (36.8/km^{2})
Skandia	Township	Marquette	810	826	−1.9%	907	71.84 sq mi (186.1 km^{2})	11.5/sq mi (4.4/km^{2})
Slagle	Township	Wexford	509	503	+1.2%	569	35.79 sq mi (92.7 km^{2})	14.1/sq mi (5.4/km^{2})
Sodus	Township	Berrien	1,995	1,932	+3.3%	2,139	19.41 sq mi (50.3 km^{2})	99.5/sq mi (38.4/km^{2})
Solon	Township	Kent	6,496	5,974	+8.7%	4,662	34.72 sq mi (89.9 km^{2})	172.1/sq mi (66.4/km^{2})
Solon	Township	Leelanau	1,562	1,509	+3.5%	1,542	26.39 sq mi (68.3 km^{2})	57.2/sq mi (22.1/km^{2})
Somerset	Township	Hillsdale	4,588	4,623	−0.8%	4,277	33.41 sq mi (86.5 km^{2})	138.4/sq mi (53.4/km^{2})
Soo	Township	Chippewa	2,966	3,141	−5.6%	2,652	50.13 sq mi (129.8 km^{2})	62.7/sq mi (24.2/km^{2})
South Arm	Township	Charlevoix	1,939	1,873	+3.5%	1,844	30.64 sq mi (79.4 km^{2})	61.1/sq mi (23.6/km^{2})
South Branch	Township	Crawford	1,638	2,007	−18.4%	1,842	104.83 sq mi (271.5 km^{2})	19.1/sq mi (7.4/km^{2})
South Branch	Township	Wexford	348	383	−9.1%	330	36.03 sq mi (93.3 km^{2})	10.6/sq mi (4.1/km^{2})
Southfield	City	Oakland	76,618	71,739	+6.8%	78,296	26.27 sq mi (68.0 km^{2})	2,730.8/sq mi (1,054.4/km^{2})
Southfield	Township	Oakland	14,886	14,547	+2.3%	14,430	8.05 sq mi (20.8 km^{2})	1,807.1/sq mi (697.7/km^{2})
Southgate	City	Wayne	30,014	30,047	−0.1%	30,136	6.85 sq mi (17.7 km^{2})	4,386.4/sq mi (1,693.6/km^{2})
South Haven	City	Van Buren, Allegan	3,964	4,403	−10.0%	5,021	3.4 sq mi (8.8 km^{2})	1,295.0/sq mi (500.0/km^{2})
South Haven	Charter township	Van Buren	4,041	3,983	+1.5%	4,046	17.42 sq mi (45.1 km^{2})	228.6/sq mi (88.3/km^{2})
South Lyon	City	Oakland	11,746	11,327	+3.7%	10,036	3.73 sq mi (9.7 km^{2})	3,036.7/sq mi (1,172.5/km^{2})
South Range	Village	Houghton	750	758	−1.1%	727	0.36 sq mi (0.93 km^{2})	2,105.6/sq mi (813.0/km^{2})
South Rockwood	Village	Monroe	1,587	1,675	−5.3%	1,284	2.35 sq mi (6.1 km^{2})	712.8/sq mi (275.2/km^{2})
Spalding	Township	Menominee	1,599	1,674	−4.5%	1,761	162.59 sq mi (421.1 km^{2})	10.3/sq mi (4.0/km^{2})
Sparta	Village	Kent	4,244	4,140	+2.5%	4,159	2.46 sq mi (6.4 km^{2})	1,682.9/sq mi (649.8/km^{2})
Sparta	Township	Kent	9,395	9,110	+3.1%	8,938	36.43 sq mi (94.4 km^{2})	250.1/sq mi (96.6/km^{2})
Spaulding	Township	Saginaw	1,975	2,153	−8.3%	2,399	25.59 sq mi (66.3 km^{2})	84.1/sq mi (32.5/km^{2})
Speaker	Township	Sanilac	1,343	1,483	−9.4%	1,408	34.55 sq mi (89.5 km^{2})	42.9/sq mi (16.6/km^{2})
Spencer	Township	Kent	4,163	3,960	+5.1%	3,681	33.97 sq mi (88.0 km^{2})	116.6/sq mi (45.0/km^{2})
Spring Arbor	Township	Jackson	8,530	8,267	+3.2%	7,577	35.1 sq mi (91 km^{2})	235.5/sq mi (90.9/km^{2})
Springdale	Township	Manistee	849	781	+8.7%	730	35.42 sq mi (91.7 km^{2})	22.0/sq mi (8.5/km^{2})
Springfield	City	Calhoun	5,292	5,260	+0.6%	5,189	3.66 sq mi (9.5 km^{2})	1,437.2/sq mi (554.9/km^{2})
Springfield	Township	Kalkaska	1,562	1,523	+2.6%	1,270	35.09 sq mi (90.9 km^{2})	43.4/sq mi (16.8/km^{2})
Springfield	Charter township	Oakland	14,703	13,940	+5.5%	13,338	35.43 sq mi (91.8 km^{2})	393.5/sq mi (151.9/km^{2})
Spring Lake	Village	Ottawa	2,497	2,323	+7.5%	2,514	1.18 sq mi (3.1 km^{2})	1,968.6/sq mi (760.1/km^{2})
Spring Lake	Township	Ottawa	15,296	14,300	+7.0%	13,140	16.48 sq mi (42.7 km^{2})	867.7/sq mi (335.0/km^{2})
Springport	Village	Jackson	776	800	−3.0%	704	1.26 sq mi (3.3 km^{2})	634.9/sq mi (245.1/km^{2})
Springport	Township	Jackson	2,142	2,159	−0.8%	2,182	36.1 sq mi (93 km^{2})	59.8/sq mi (23.1/km^{2})
Springvale	Township	Emmet	2,146	2,141	+0.2%	1,727	44.71 sq mi (115.8 km^{2})	47.9/sq mi (18.5/km^{2})
Springville	Township	Wexford	1,739	1,755	−0.9%	1,673	32.5 sq mi (84 km^{2})	54.0/sq mi (20.8/km^{2})
Spurr	Township	Baraga	262	276	−5.1%	227	150.83 sq mi (390.6 km^{2})	1.8/sq mi (0.7/km^{2})
Stambaugh	Township	Iron	1,200	1,140	+5.3%	1,248	181.49 sq mi (470.1 km^{2})	6.3/sq mi (2.4/km^{2})
Standish†	City	Arenac	1,458	1,509	−3.4%	1,581	2.15 sq mi (5.6 km^{2})	701.9/sq mi (271.0/km^{2})
Standish	Township	Arenac	1,701	1,900	−10.5%	2,026	27.63 sq mi (71.6 km^{2})	68.8/sq mi (26.6/km^{2})
Stannard	Township	Ontonagon	645	790	−18.4%	833	125.1 sq mi (324 km^{2})	6.3/sq mi (2.4/km^{2})
Stanton	Township	Houghton	1,590	1,419	+12.1%	1,268	122.38 sq mi (317.0 km^{2})	11.6/sq mi (4.5/km^{2})
Stanton†	City	Montcalm	1,348	1,417	−4.9%	1,504	2.15 sq mi (5.6 km^{2})	659.1/sq mi (254.5/km^{2})
Stanwood	Village	Mecosta	194	211	−8.1%	204	0.24 sq mi (0.62 km^{2})	879.2/sq mi (339.4/km^{2})
Star	Township	Antrim	1,028	926	+11.0%	745	34.39 sq mi (89.1 km^{2})	26.9/sq mi (10.4/km^{2})
Stephenson	City	Menominee	816	862	−5.3%	875	1.09 sq mi (2.8 km^{2})	790.8/sq mi (305.3/km^{2})
Stephenson	Township	Menominee	616	670	−8.1%	716	40.72 sq mi (105.5 km^{2})	16.5/sq mi (6.4/km^{2})
Sterling	Village	Arenac	474	530	−10.6%	533	0.98 sq mi (2.5 km^{2})	540.8/sq mi (208.8/km^{2})
Sterling Heights	City	Macomb	134,346	129,699	+3.6%	124,471	36.5 sq mi (95 km^{2})	3,553.4/sq mi (1,372.0/km^{2})
Stevensville	Village	Berrien	1,147	1,142	+0.4%	1,191	1.04 sq mi (2.7 km^{2})	1,098.1/sq mi (424.0/km^{2})
Stockbridge	Village	Ingham	1,244	1,218	+2.1%	1,260	1.51 sq mi (3.9 km^{2})	806.6/sq mi (311.4/km^{2})
Stockbridge	Township	Ingham	3,912	3,896	+0.4%	3,435	35.46 sq mi (91.8 km^{2})	109.9/sq mi (42.4/km^{2})
Stronach	Township	Manistee	834	821	+1.6%	804	54.98 sq mi (142.4 km^{2})	14.9/sq mi (5.8/km^{2})
Sturgis	City	St. Joseph	11,082	10,994	+0.8%	11,285	6.49 sq mi (16.8 km^{2})	1,694.0/sq mi (654.1/km^{2})
Sturgis	Township	St. Joseph	2,042	2,261	−9.7%	2,403	17.68 sq mi (45.8 km^{2})	127.9/sq mi (49.4/km^{2})
Sugar Island	Township	Chippewa	653	652	+0.2%	683	49.35 sq mi (127.8 km^{2})	13.2/sq mi (5.1/km^{2})
Sullivan	Township	Muskegon	2,541	2,441	+4.1%	2,477	24.08 sq mi (62.4 km^{2})	101.4/sq mi (39.1/km^{2})
Summerfield	Township	Clare	459	456	+0.7%	453	35.2 sq mi (91 km^{2})	13.0/sq mi (5.0/km^{2})
Summerfield	Township	Monroe	3,176	3,308	−4.0%	3,233	41.98 sq mi (108.7 km^{2})	78.8/sq mi (30.4/km^{2})
Summit	Township	Jackson	22,920	22,508	+1.8%	21,534	29.09 sq mi (75.3 km^{2})	773.7/sq mi (298.7/km^{2})
Summit	Township	Mason	995	924	+7.7%	1,021	12.8 sq mi (33 km^{2})	72.2/sq mi (27.9/km^{2})
Sumner	Township	Gratiot	1,863	1,930	−3.5%	1,911	35.65 sq mi (92.3 km^{2})	54.1/sq mi (20.9/km^{2})
Sumpter	Township	Wayne	9,660	9,549	+1.2%	11,856	37.36 sq mi (96.8 km^{2})	255.6/sq mi (98.7/km^{2})
Sunfield	Village	Eaton	518	578	−10.4%	591	0.8 sq mi (2.1 km^{2})	722.5/sq mi (279.0/km^{2})
Sunfield	Township	Eaton	2,050	1,997	+2.7%	2,177	36.09 sq mi (93.5 km^{2})	55.3/sq mi (21.4/km^{2})
Superior	Township	Chippewa	1,276	1,337	−4.6%	1,329	102.98 sq mi (266.7 km^{2})	13.0/sq mi (5.0/km^{2})
Superior	Charter township	Washtenaw	14,832	13,058	+13.6%	10,740	35.21 sq mi (91.2 km^{2})	370.9/sq mi (143.2/km^{2})
Surrey	Township	Clare	3,635	3,606	+0.8%	3,555	35.1 sq mi (91 km^{2})	102.7/sq mi (39.7/km^{2})
Suttons Bay	Village	Leelanau	613	618	−0.8%	589	1.25 sq mi (3.2 km^{2})	494.4/sq mi (190.9/km^{2})
Suttons Bay†	Township	Leelanau	2,883	2,982	−3.3%	2,982	24.52 sq mi (63.5 km^{2})	121.6/sq mi (47.0/km^{2})
Swan Creek	Township	Saginaw	2,416	2,456	−1.6%	2,536	22.95 sq mi (59.4 km^{2})	107.0/sq mi (41.3/km^{2})
Swartz Creek	City	Genesee	5,897	5,758	+2.4%	5,102	4.04 sq mi (10.5 km^{2})	1,425.2/sq mi (550.3/km^{2})
Sweetwater	Township	Lake	258	245	+5.3%	238	35.69 sq mi (92.4 km^{2})	6.9/sq mi (2.7/km^{2})
Sylvan	Township	Osceola	967	1,099	−12.0%	1,033	34.56 sq mi (89.5 km^{2})	31.8/sq mi (12.3/km^{2})
Sylvan	Township	Washtenaw	3,311	2,833	+16.9%	6,425	32.59 sq mi (84.4 km^{2})	86.9/sq mi (33.6/km^{2})
Sylvan Lake	City	Oakland	1,723	1,720	+0.2%	1,735	0.51 sq mi (1.3 km^{2})	3,372.5/sq mi (1,302.1/km^{2})
Tallmadge	Charter township	Ottawa	8,802	7,575	+16.2%	6,881	32.21 sq mi (83.4 km^{2})	235.2/sq mi (90.8/km^{2})
Tawas	Township	Iosco	1,733	1,744	−0.6%	1,684	33.39 sq mi (86.5 km^{2})	52.2/sq mi (20.2/km^{2})
Tawas City†	City	Iosco	1,834	1,827	+0.4%	2,005	1.72 sq mi (4.5 km^{2})	1,062.2/sq mi (410.1/km^{2})
Taylor	City	Wayne	63,409	63,131	+0.4%	65,868	23.6 sq mi (61 km^{2})	2,675.0/sq mi (1,032.8/km^{2})
Taymouth	Township	Saginaw	4,065	4,520	−10.1%	4,624	35.38 sq mi (91.6 km^{2})	127.8/sq mi (49.3/km^{2})
Tecumseh	City	Lenawee	8,680	8,521	+1.9%	8,574	5.7 sq mi (15 km^{2})	1,494.9/sq mi (577.2/km^{2})
Tecumseh	Township	Lenawee	2,042	1,972	+3.5%	1,881	12.57 sq mi (32.6 km^{2})	156.9/sq mi (60.6/km^{2})
Tekonsha	Village	Calhoun	653	717	−8.9%	712	0.71 sq mi (1.8 km^{2})	1,009.9/sq mi (389.9/km^{2})
Tekonsha	Township	Calhoun	1,520	1,645	−7.6%	1,734	35.4 sq mi (92 km^{2})	46.5/sq mi (17.9/km^{2})
Texas	Charter township	Kalamazoo	17,691	14,697	+20.4%	10,919	34.38 sq mi (89.0 km^{2})	427.5/sq mi (165.1/km^{2})
Thetford	Township	Genesee	6,640	7,049	−5.8%	8,277	34.55 sq mi (89.5 km^{2})	204.0/sq mi (78.8/km^{2})
Thomas	Township	Saginaw	11,931	11,985	−0.5%	11,877	30.61 sq mi (79.3 km^{2})	391.5/sq mi (151.2/km^{2})
Thompson	Township	Schoolcraft	808	795	+1.6%	671	112.38 sq mi (291.1 km^{2})	7.1/sq mi (2.7/km^{2})
Thompsonville	Village	Benzie	451	441	+2.3%	457	1 sq mi (2.6 km^{2})	441.0/sq mi (170.3/km^{2})
Thornapple	Township	Barry	9,331	7,884	+18.4%	6,685	35.28 sq mi (91.4 km^{2})	223.5/sq mi (86.3/km^{2})
Three Oaks	Village	Berrien	1,370	1,622	−15.5%	1,829	0.99 sq mi (2.6 km^{2})	1,638.4/sq mi (632.6/km^{2})
Three Oaks	Township	Berrien	2,324	2,574	−9.7%	2,949	23.29 sq mi (60.3 km^{2})	110.5/sq mi (42.7/km^{2})
Three Rivers	City	St. Joseph	7,973	7,811	+2.1%	7,328	5.4 sq mi (14 km^{2})	1,446.5/sq mi (558.5/km^{2})
Tilden	Township	Marquette	1,045	1,013	+3.2%	1,003	89.89 sq mi (232.8 km^{2})	11.3/sq mi (4.4/km^{2})
Tittabawassee	Township	Saginaw	10,606	9,726	+9.0%	7,706	35.16 sq mi (91.1 km^{2})	276.6/sq mi (106.8/km^{2})
Tobacco	Township	Gladwin	2,459	2,566	−4.2%	2,552	33.75 sq mi (87.4 km^{2})	76.0/sq mi (29.4/km^{2})
Tompkins	Township	Jackson	2,618	2,671	−2.0%	2,758	36.01 sq mi (93.3 km^{2})	74.2/sq mi (28.6/km^{2})
Torch Lake	Township	Antrim	1,212	1,194	+1.5%	1,159	15.09 sq mi (39.1 km^{2})	79.1/sq mi (30.6/km^{2})
Torch Lake	Township	Houghton	1,893	1,880	+0.7%	1,860	79.87 sq mi (206.9 km^{2})	23.5/sq mi (9.1/km^{2})
Traverse City†	City	Grand Traverse, Leelanau	15,678	14,674	+6.8%	14,532	8.33 sq mi (21.6 km^{2})	1,761.6/sq mi (680.2/km^{2})
Trenton	City	Wayne	18,544	18,853	−1.6%	19,584	7.28 sq mi (18.9 km^{2})	2,589.7/sq mi (999.9/km^{2})
Trout Lake	Township	Chippewa	332	384	−13.5%	465	141.39 sq mi (366.2 km^{2})	2.7/sq mi (1.0/km^{2})
Trowbridge	Township	Allegan	2,530	2,502	+1.1%	2,519	34.64 sq mi (89.7 km^{2})	72.2/sq mi (27.9/km^{2})
Troy	Township	Newaygo	254	283	−10.2%	243	34.84 sq mi (90.2 km^{2})	8.1/sq mi (3.1/km^{2})
Troy	City	Oakland	87,294	80,980	+7.8%	80,959	33.47 sq mi (86.7 km^{2})	2,419.5/sq mi (934.2/km^{2})
Turin	Township	Marquette	110	153	−28.1%	131	83.7 sq mi (217 km^{2})	1.8/sq mi (0.7/km^{2})
Turner	Village	Arenac	121	114	+6.1%	139	1.02 sq mi (2.6 km^{2})	111.8/sq mi (43.2/km^{2})
Turner	Township	Arenac	519	550	−5.6%	642	31.14 sq mi (80.7 km^{2})	17.7/sq mi (6.8/km^{2})
Tuscarora	Township	Cheboygan	3,080	3,038	+1.4%	3,091	29.41 sq mi (76.2 km^{2})	103.3/sq mi (39.9/km^{2})
Tuscola	Township	Tuscola	1,978	2,082	−5.0%	2,152	32.79 sq mi (84.9 km^{2})	63.5/sq mi (24.5/km^{2})
Tustin	Village	Osceola	270	230	+17.4%	237	0.39 sq mi (1.0 km^{2})	589.7/sq mi (227.7/km^{2})
Twining	Village	Arenac	130	181	−28.2%	192	0.97 sq mi (2.5 km^{2})	186.6/sq mi (72.0/km^{2})
Tyrone	Township	Kent	5,021	4,731	+6.1%	4,304	36.12 sq mi (93.6 km^{2})	131.0/sq mi (50.6/km^{2})
Tyrone	Township	Livingston	11,986	10,020	+19.6%	8,459	35.4 sq mi (92 km^{2})	283.1/sq mi (109.3/km^{2})
Ubly	Village	Huron	836	858	−2.6%	873	1.34 sq mi (3.5 km^{2})	640.3/sq mi (247.2/km^{2})
Unadilla	Township	Livingston	3,333	3,366	−1.0%	3,190	33.75 sq mi (87.4 km^{2})	99.7/sq mi (38.5/km^{2})
Union	Township	Branch	2,942	2,868	+2.6%	3,121	35.46 sq mi (91.8 km^{2})	80.9/sq mi (31.2/km^{2})
Union	Township	Grand Traverse	468	405	+15.6%	417	35.81 sq mi (92.7 km^{2})	11.3/sq mi (4.4/km^{2})
Union	Charter township	Isabella	11,699	12,927	−9.5%	7,615	28.16 sq mi (72.9 km^{2})	459.1/sq mi (177.2/km^{2})
Union City	Village	Branch, Calhoun	1,714	1,599	+7.2%	1,804	1.44 sq mi (3.7 km^{2})	1,110.4/sq mi (428.7/km^{2})
Unionville	Village	Tuscola	481	508	−5.3%	605	0.94 sq mi (2.4 km^{2})	540.4/sq mi (208.7/km^{2})
Utica	City	Macomb	5,245	4,757	+10.3%	4,577	1.71 sq mi (4.4 km^{2})	2,781.9/sq mi (1,074.1/km^{2})
Valley	Township	Allegan	2,221	2,018	+10.1%	1,831	32.92 sq mi (85.3 km^{2})	61.3/sq mi (23.7/km^{2})
Van Buren	Charter township	Wayne	30,375	28,821	+5.4%	23,559	33.97 sq mi (88.0 km^{2})	848.4/sq mi (327.6/km^{2})
Vandalia	Village	Cass	318	301	+5.6%	429	0.99 sq mi (2.6 km^{2})	304.0/sq mi (117.4/km^{2})
Vanderbilt	Village	Otsego	498	562	−11.4%	587	1.13 sq mi (2.9 km^{2})	497.3/sq mi (192.0/km^{2})
Vassar	City	Tuscola	2,727	2,697	+1.1%	2,823	2.12 sq mi (5.5 km^{2})	1,272.2/sq mi (491.2/km^{2})
Vassar	Township	Tuscola	3,890	4,093	−5.0%	4,356	35.05 sq mi (90.8 km^{2})	116.8/sq mi (45.1/km^{2})
Venice	Township	Shiawassee	2,422	2,578	−6.1%	2,588	37.44 sq mi (97.0 km^{2})	68.9/sq mi (26.6/km^{2})
Vergennes	Township	Kent	4,741	4,189	+13.2%	3,611	34.49 sq mi (89.3 km^{2})	121.5/sq mi (46.9/km^{2})
Vermontville	Village	Eaton	716	759	−5.7%	789	1.26 sq mi (3.3 km^{2})	602.4/sq mi (232.6/km^{2})
Vermontville	Township	Eaton	1,947	2,053	−5.2%	2,100	36.11 sq mi (93.5 km^{2})	56.9/sq mi (22.0/km^{2})
Vernon	Township	Isabella	1,300	1,369	−5.0%	1,342	35.34 sq mi (91.5 km^{2})	38.7/sq mi (15.0/km^{2})
Vernon	Village	Shiawassee	738	783	−5.7%	847	0.69 sq mi (1.8 km^{2})	1,134.8/sq mi (438.1/km^{2})
Vernon	Township	Shiawassee	4,273	4,614	−7.4%	4,980	33.69 sq mi (87.3 km^{2})	137.0/sq mi (52.9/km^{2})
Verona	Township	Huron	1,210	1,259	−3.9%	1,349	34.13 sq mi (88.4 km^{2})	36.9/sq mi (14.2/km^{2})
Vevay	Township	Ingham	3,606	3,537	+2.0%	3,614	31.56 sq mi (81.7 km^{2})	112.1/sq mi (43.3/km^{2})
Vicksburg	Village	Kalamazoo	3,706	2,906	+27.5%	2,320	3.01 sq mi (7.8 km^{2})	965.4/sq mi (372.8/km^{2})
Victor	Township	Clinton	3,463	3,460	+0.1%	3,275	33.93 sq mi (87.9 km^{2})	102.0/sq mi (39.4/km^{2})
Victory	Township	Mason	1,406	1,383	+1.7%	1,444	35.93 sq mi (93.1 km^{2})	38.5/sq mi (14.9/km^{2})
Vienna	Charter township	Genesee	13,301	13,255	+0.3%	13,108	35.01 sq mi (90.7 km^{2})	378.6/sq mi (146.2/km^{2})
Vienna	Township	Montmorency	535	587	−8.9%	572	69.1 sq mi (179 km^{2})	8.5/sq mi (3.3/km^{2})
Village of Clarkston	City	Oakland	928	882	+5.2%	962	0.44 sq mi (1.1 km^{2})	2,004.5/sq mi (774.0/km^{2})
Village of Grosse Pointe Shores	City	Wayne, Macomb	2,647	3,008	−12.0%	2823	1.15 sq mi (3.0 km^{2})	2,615.7/sq mi (1,009.9/km^{2})
Volinia	Township	Cass	1,096	1,112	−1.4%	1,174	34.39 sq mi (89.1 km^{2})	32.3/sq mi (12.5/km^{2})
Wakefield	City	Gogebic	1,702	1,851	−8.0%	2,085	8.02 sq mi (20.8 km^{2})	230.8/sq mi (89.1/km^{2})
Wakefield	Township	Gogebic	301	305	−1.3%	364	179.7 sq mi (465 km^{2})	1.7/sq mi (0.7/km^{2})
Wakeshma	Township	Kalamazoo	1,341	1,301	+3.1%	1,414	36.02 sq mi (93.3 km^{2})	36.1/sq mi (13.9/km^{2})
Waldron	Village	Hillsdale	505	538	−6.1%	590	1 sq mi (2.6 km^{2})	538.0/sq mi (207.7/km^{2})
Wales	Township	St. Clair	3,180	3,248	−2.1%	2,986	37.37 sq mi (96.8 km^{2})	86.9/sq mi (33.6/km^{2})
Walker	Township	Cheboygan	297	327	−9.2%	292	34.19 sq mi (88.6 km^{2})	9.6/sq mi (3.7/km^{2})
Walker	City	Kent	25,132	23,537	+6.8%	21,842	24.94 sq mi (64.6 km^{2})	943.7/sq mi (364.4/km^{2})
Walkerville	Village	Oceana	246	247	−0.4%	254	1.08 sq mi (2.8 km^{2})	228.7/sq mi (88.3/km^{2})
Walled Lake	City	Oakland	7,250	6,999	+3.6%	6,713	2.18 sq mi (5.6 km^{2})	3,210.6/sq mi (1,239.6/km^{2})
Walton	Township	Eaton	2,293	2,266	+1.2%	2,011	35.21 sq mi (91.2 km^{2})	64.4/sq mi (24.8/km^{2})
Warner	Township	Antrim	364	416	−12.5%	389	35.5 sq mi (92 km^{2})	11.7/sq mi (4.5/km^{2})
Warren	City	Macomb	139,387	134,056	+4.0%	138,247	34.38 sq mi (89.0 km^{2})	3,899.2/sq mi (1,505.5/km^{2})
Warren	Township	Midland	2,040	2,119	−3.7%	2,107	34.75 sq mi (90.0 km^{2})	61.0/sq mi (23.5/km^{2})
Washington	Township	Gratiot	813	870	−6.6%	909	35.25 sq mi (91.3 km^{2})	24.7/sq mi (9.5/km^{2})
Washington	Charter township	Macomb	28,165	25,139	+12.0%	19,080	35.48 sq mi (91.9 km^{2})	708.5/sq mi (273.6/km^{2})
Washington	Township	Sanilac	1,524	1,659	−8.1%	1,636	35.95 sq mi (93.1 km^{2})	46.1/sq mi (17.8/km^{2})
Waterford	Charter township	Oakland	70,565	71,707	−1.6%	73,150	30.66 sq mi (79.4 km^{2})	2,338.8/sq mi (903.0/km^{2})
Waterloo	Township	Jackson	2,931	2,856	+2.6%	3,069	47.62 sq mi (123.3 km^{2})	60.0/sq mi (23.2/km^{2})
Watersmeet	Township	Gogebic	1,456	1,417	+2.8%	1,472	254.77 sq mi (659.9 km^{2})	5.6/sq mi (2.1/km^{2})
Watertown	Charter township	Clinton	5,563	4,836	+15.0%	4,162	35.51 sq mi (92.0 km^{2})	136.2/sq mi (52.6/km^{2})
Watertown	Township	Sanilac	1,263	1,320	−4.3%	1,376	35.04 sq mi (90.8 km^{2})	37.7/sq mi (14.5/km^{2})
Watertown	Township	Tuscola	2,091	2,202	−5.0%	2,231	32.53 sq mi (84.3 km^{2})	67.7/sq mi (26.1/km^{2})
Watervliet	City	Berrien	1,669	1,735	−3.8%	1,843	1.19 sq mi (3.1 km^{2})	1,458.0/sq mi (562.9/km^{2})
Watervliet	Township	Berrien	3,036	3,102	−2.1%	3,392	13.47 sq mi (34.9 km^{2})	230.3/sq mi (88.9/km^{2})
Watson	Township	Allegan	2,176	2,063	+5.5%	2,086	35.36 sq mi (91.6 km^{2})	58.3/sq mi (22.5/km^{2})
Waucedah	Township	Dickinson	809	804	+0.6%	800	88.5 sq mi (229 km^{2})	9.1/sq mi (3.5/km^{2})
Waverly	Township	Cheboygan	373	457	−18.4%	472	48.19 sq mi (124.8 km^{2})	9.5/sq mi (3.7/km^{2})
Waverly	Township	Van Buren	2,506	2,554	−1.9%	2,467	34.12 sq mi (88.4 km^{2})	74.9/sq mi (28.9/km^{2})
Wawatam	Township	Emmet	711	661	+7.6%	705	15.73 sq mi (40.7 km^{2})	42.0/sq mi (16.2/km^{2})
Wayland	City	Allegan	4,435	4,079	+8.7%	3,939	2.98 sq mi (7.7 km^{2})	1,368.8/sq mi (528.5/km^{2})
Wayland	Township	Allegan	3,573	3,088	+15.7%	3,013	32.62 sq mi (84.5 km^{2})	94.7/sq mi (36.6/km^{2})
Wayne	Township	Cass	2,576	2,654	−2.9%	2,861	34.25 sq mi (88.7 km^{2})	77.5/sq mi (29.9/km^{2})
Wayne	City	Wayne	17,713	17,593	+0.7%	19,051	6.02 sq mi (15.6 km^{2})	2,922.4/sq mi (1,128.4/km^{2})
Weare	Township	Oceana	1,224	1,210	+1.2%	1,261	33.91 sq mi (87.8 km^{2})	35.7/sq mi (13.8/km^{2})
Webber	Township	Lake	2,384	1,699	+40.3%	1,875	34.97 sq mi (90.6 km^{2})	48.6/sq mi (18.8/km^{2})
Webberville	Village	Ingham	1,288	1,272	+1.3%	1,503	1.83 sq mi (4.7 km^{2})	695.1/sq mi (268.4/km^{2})
Webster	Township	Washtenaw	6,575	6,784	−3.1%	5,198	35.09 sq mi (90.9 km^{2})	193.3/sq mi (74.6/km^{2})
Weesaw	Township	Berrien	1,832	1,936	−5.4%	2,065	35.44 sq mi (91.8 km^{2})	54.6/sq mi (21.1/km^{2})
Weldon	Township	Benzie	579	542	+6.8%	530	36.43 sq mi (94.4 km^{2})	14.9/sq mi (5.7/km^{2})
Wellington	Township	Alpena	250	307	−18.6%	296	53.22 sq mi (137.8 km^{2})	5.8/sq mi (2.2/km^{2})
Wells	Township	Delta	4,876	4,885	−0.2%	5,044	39.56 sq mi (102.5 km^{2})	123.5/sq mi (47.7/km^{2})
Wells	Township	Marquette	213	231	−7.8%	292	154.11 sq mi (399.1 km^{2})	1.5/sq mi (0.6/km^{2})
Wells	Township	Tuscola	1,590	1,773	−10.3%	1,946	34.26 sq mi (88.7 km^{2})	51.8/sq mi (20.0/km^{2})
West Bloomfield	Charter township	Oakland	65,888	64,690	+1.9%	64,860	27.01 sq mi (70.0 km^{2})	2,395.0/sq mi (924.7/km^{2})
West Branch	Township	Dickinson	51	63	−19.0%	67	111.46 sq mi (288.7 km^{2})	0.6/sq mi (0.2/km^{2})
West Branch	Township	Marquette	1,702	1,623	+4.9%	1,648	35.48 sq mi (91.9 km^{2})	45.7/sq mi (17.7/km^{2})
West Branch	Township	Missaukee	452	466	−3.0%	532	35.55 sq mi (92.1 km^{2})	13.1/sq mi (5.1/km^{2})
West Branch†	City	Ogemaw	2,351	2,139	+9.9%	1,926	1.48 sq mi (3.8 km^{2})	1,445.3/sq mi (558.0/km^{2})
West Branch	Township	Ogemaw	2,567	2,593	−1.0%	2,628	34.02 sq mi (88.1 km^{2})	76.2/sq mi (29.4/km^{2})
Westland	City	Wayne	85,420	84,094	+1.6%	86,602	20.42 sq mi (52.9 km^{2})	4,118.2/sq mi (1,590.1/km^{2})
Westphalia	Village	Clinton	924	923	+0.1%	876	1.11 sq mi (2.9 km^{2})	831.5/sq mi (321.1/km^{2})
Westphalia	Township	Clinton	2,444	2,365	+3.3%	2,257	35.52 sq mi (92.0 km^{2})	66.6/sq mi (25.7/km^{2})
West Traverse	Township	Emmet	1,768	1,606	+10.1%	1,448	13.37 sq mi (34.6 km^{2})	120.1/sq mi (46.4/km^{2})
Wexford	Township	Wexford	1,161	1,072	+8.3%	798	36.54 sq mi (94.6 km^{2})	29.3/sq mi (11.3/km^{2})
Wheatfield	Township	Ingham	1,665	1,632	+2.0%	1,641	29.14 sq mi (75.5 km^{2})	56.0/sq mi (21.6/km^{2})
Wheatland	Township	Hillsdale	1,341	1,351	−0.7%	1,258	35.65 sq mi (92.3 km^{2})	37.9/sq mi (14.6/km^{2})
Wheatland	Township	Mecosta	1,396	1,403	−0.5%	1,474	35.48 sq mi (91.9 km^{2})	39.5/sq mi (15.3/km^{2})
Wheatland	Township	Sanilac	416	488	−14.8%	530	36.34 sq mi (94.1 km^{2})	13.4/sq mi (5.2/km^{2})
Wheeler	Township	Gratiot	2,612	2,786	−6.2%	2,785	35.88 sq mi (92.9 km^{2})	77.6/sq mi (30.0/km^{2})
White Cloud†	City	Newaygo	1,479	1,408	+5.0%	1420	1.95 sq mi (5.1 km^{2})	722.1/sq mi (278.8/km^{2})
Whitefish	Township	Chippewa	474	575	−17.6%	588	241.50 sq mi (625.5 km^{2})	2.4/sq mi (0.9/km^{2})
Whiteford	Township	Monroe	4,590	4,602	−0.3%	4,420	39.72 sq mi (102.9 km^{2})	115.9/sq mi (44.7/km^{2})
Whitehall	City	Muskegon	2,909	2,706	+7.5%	2,884	3.12 sq mi (8.1 km^{2})	867.3/sq mi (334.9/km^{2})
Whitehall	Township	Muskegon	1,768	1,739	+1.7%	1,648	8.87 sq mi (23.0 km^{2})	196.1/sq mi (75.7/km^{2})
White Lake	Charter township	Oakland	30,950	30,019	+3.1%	28,219	33.52 sq mi (86.8 km^{2})	895.6/sq mi (345.8/km^{2})
White Oak	Township	Ingham	1,199	1,173	+2.2%	1,177	36.28 sq mi (94.0 km^{2})	32.3/sq mi (12.5/km^{2})
White Pigeon	Village	St. Joseph	1,718	1,522	+12.9%	1,627	1.39 sq mi (3.6 km^{2})	1,095.0/sq mi (422.8/km^{2})
White Pigeon	Township	St. Joseph	3,762	3,753	+0.2%	3,847	25.10 sq mi (65.0 km^{2})	149.5/sq mi (57.7/km^{2})
White River	Township	Muskegon	1,383	1,335	+3.6%	1,338	15.72 sq mi (40.7 km^{2})	84.9/sq mi (32.8/km^{2})
Whitewater	Township	Grand Traverse	2,688	2,597	+3.5%	2,467	47.84 sq mi (123.9 km^{2})	54.3/sq mi (21.0/km^{2})
Whitney	Township	Arenac	907	1,001	−9.4%	1,033	30.73 sq mi (79.6 km^{2})	32.6/sq mi (12.6/km^{2})
Whittemore	City	Iosco	414	384	+7.8%	476	0.98 sq mi (2.5 km^{2})	391.8/sq mi (151.3/km^{2})
Wilber	Township	Iosco	720	729	−1.2%	740	72.44 sq mi (187.6 km^{2})	10.1/sq mi (3.9/km^{2})
Wilcox	Township	Newaygo	1,133	1,098	+3.2%	1,145	32.43 sq mi (84.0 km^{2})	33.9/sq mi (13.1/km^{2})
Williams	Charter township	Bay	5,058	4,772	+6.0%	4,492	33.55 sq mi (86.9 km^{2})	142.2/sq mi (54.9/km^{2})
Williamston	City	Ingham	3,819	3,854	−0.9%	3,441	2.44 sq mi (6.3 km^{2})	1,579.5/sq mi (609.9/km^{2})
Williamstown	Township	Ingham	5,286	4,978	+6.2%	4,834	29.09 sq mi (75.3 km^{2})	171.1/sq mi (66.1/km^{2})
Wilmot	Township	Cheboygan	822	878	−6.4%	826	35.76 sq mi (92.6 km^{2})	24.6/sq mi (9.5/km^{2})
Wilson	Township	Alpena	1,972	2,029	−2.8%	2,074	79.27 sq mi (205.3 km^{2})	25.6/sq mi (9.9/km^{2})
Wilson	Township	Charlevoix	1,858	1,964	−5.4%	2022	34.05 sq mi (88.2 km^{2})	57.7/sq mi (22.3/km^{2})
Windsor	Charter township	Eaton	7,140	6,838	+4.4%	7,340	34.49 sq mi (89.3 km^{2})	198.3/sq mi (76.5/km^{2})
Winfield	Township	Montcalm	2,279	2,235	+2.0%	2,049	35.46 sq mi (91.8 km^{2})	63.0/sq mi (24.3/km^{2})
Winsor	Township	Huron	1,960	1,907	+2.8%	2,044	35.23 sq mi (91.2 km^{2})	54.1/sq mi (20.9/km^{2})
Winterfield	Township	Clare	460	459	+0.2%	483	36.05 sq mi (93.4 km^{2})	12.7/sq mi (4.9/km^{2})
Wise	Township	Isabella	1,355	1,397	−3.0%	1,301	36.5 sq mi (95 km^{2})	38.3/sq mi (14.8/km^{2})
Wisner	Township	Tuscola	604	690	−12.5%	749	19.32 sq mi (50.0 km^{2})	35.7/sq mi (13.8/km^{2})
Wixom	City	Oakland	17,193	13,498	+27.4%	13,263	9.15 sq mi (23.7 km^{2})	1,475.2/sq mi (569.6/km^{2})
Wolverine	Village	Cheboygan	309	244	+26.6%	359	0.98 sq mi (2.5 km^{2})	249.0/sq mi (96.1/km^{2})
Wolverine Lake	Village	Oakland	4,544	4,312	+5.4%	4,415	1.27 sq mi (3.3 km^{2})	3,395.3/sq mi (1,310.9/km^{2})
Woodbridge	Township	Hillsdale	1,322	1,325	−0.2%	1,337	30.05 sq mi (77.8 km^{2})	44.1/sq mi (17.0/km^{2})
Woodhaven	City	Wayne	12,941	12,875	+0.5%	12,530	6.39 sq mi (16.6 km^{2})	2,014.9/sq mi (777.9/km^{2})
Woodhull	Township	Shiawassee	3,687	3,810	−3.2%	3,850	25.52 sq mi (66.1 km^{2})	149.3/sq mi (57.6/km^{2})
Woodland	Village	Barry	391	425	−8.0%	495	0.81 sq mi (2.1 km^{2})	524.7/sq mi (202.6/km^{2})
Woodland	Township	Barry	1,994	2,047	−2.6%	2,129	35.38 sq mi (91.6 km^{2})	57.9/sq mi (22.3/km^{2})
Woodstock	Township	Lenawee	3,608	3,505	+2.9%	3,468	33.88 sq mi (87.7 km^{2})	103.5/sq mi (39.9/km^{2})
Worth	Township	Sanilac	3,455	3,894	−11.3%	4,021	38.60 sq mi (100.0 km^{2})	100.9/sq mi (39.0/km^{2})
Wright	Township	Hillsdale	1,618	1,655	−2.2%	1,788	43.35 sq mi (112.3 km^{2})	38.2/sq mi (14.7/km^{2})
Wright	Township	Ottawa	3,190	3,147	+1.4%	3,286	36.10 sq mi (93.5 km^{2})	87.2/sq mi (33.7/km^{2})
Wyandotte	City	Wayne	25,058	25,883	−3.2%	28,006	5.27 sq mi (13.6 km^{2})	4,911.4/sq mi (1,896.3/km^{2})
Wyoming	City	Kent	76,501	72,125	+6.1%	69,368	24.64 sq mi (63.8 km^{2})	2,927.2/sq mi (1,130.2/km^{2})
Yale	City	St. Clair	1,903	1,955	−2.7%	2,063	1.38 sq mi (3.6 km^{2})	1,416.7/sq mi (547.0/km^{2})
Yankee Springs	Township	Barry	5,322	4,065	+30.9%	4,219	31.06 sq mi (80.4 km^{2})	130.9/sq mi (50.5/km^{2})
Yates	Township	Lake	755	761	−0.8%	714	35.29 sq mi (91.4 km^{2})	21.6/sq mi (8.3/km^{2})
York	Charter township	Washtenaw	9,108	8,708	+4.6%	7,392	34.70 sq mi (89.9 km^{2})	251.0/sq mi (96.9/km^{2})
Ypsilanti	City	Washtenaw	20,648	19,435	+6.2%	22,362	4.33 sq mi (11.2 km^{2})	4,488.5/sq mi (1,733.0/km^{2})
Ypsilanti	Charter township	Washtenaw	55,670	53,362	+4.3%	49,182	29.93 sq mi (77.5 km^{2})	1,782.9/sq mi (688.4/km^{2})
Zeeland	City	Ottawa	5,719	5,504	+3.9%	5,805	2.99 sq mi (7.7 km^{2})	1,840.8/sq mi (710.7/km^{2})
Zeeland	Charter township	Ottawa	12,008	9,971	+20.4%	7,613	34.40 sq mi (89.1 km^{2})	289.9/sq mi (111.9/km^{2})
Zilwaukee	City	Saginaw	1,534	1,658	−7.5%	1,799	2.21 sq mi (5.7 km^{2})	750.2/sq mi (289.7/km^{2})
Zilwaukee	Township	Saginaw	62	67	−7.5%	61	3.58 sq mi (9.3 km^{2})	18.7/sq mi (7.2/km^{2})

== See also ==
- Administrative divisions of Michigan
- List of census-designated places in Michigan

== Images ==
Largest municipalities in Michigan by population (2020 U.S. Census)

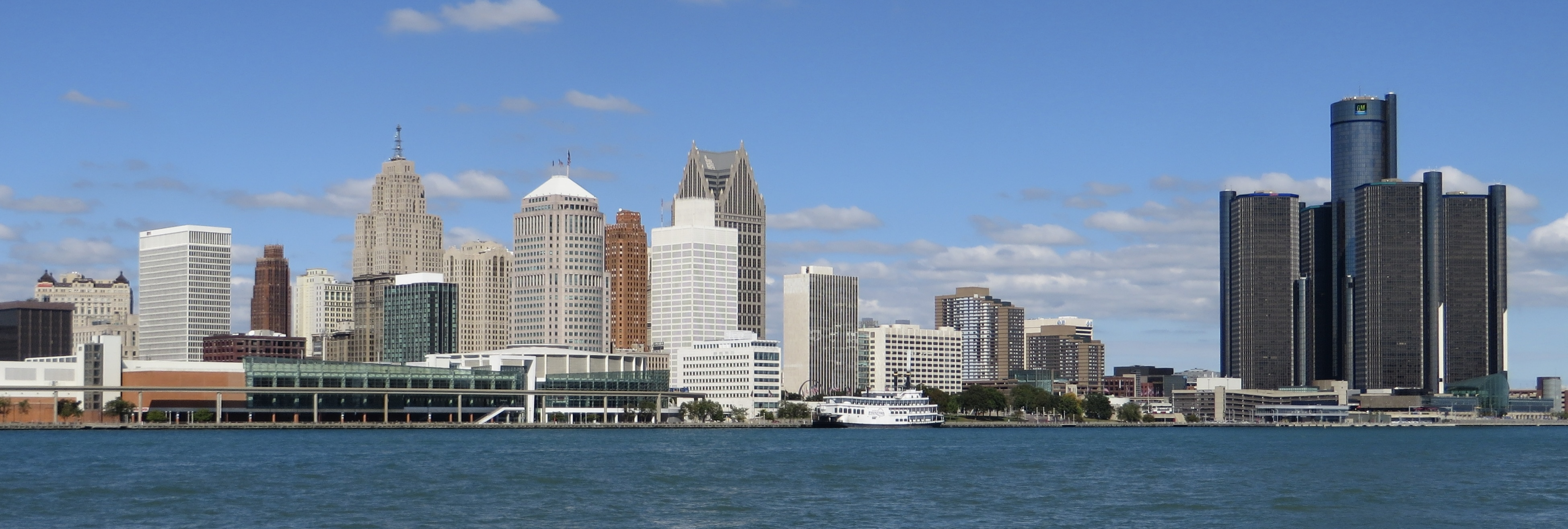
Detroit, the largest city in Michigan by population

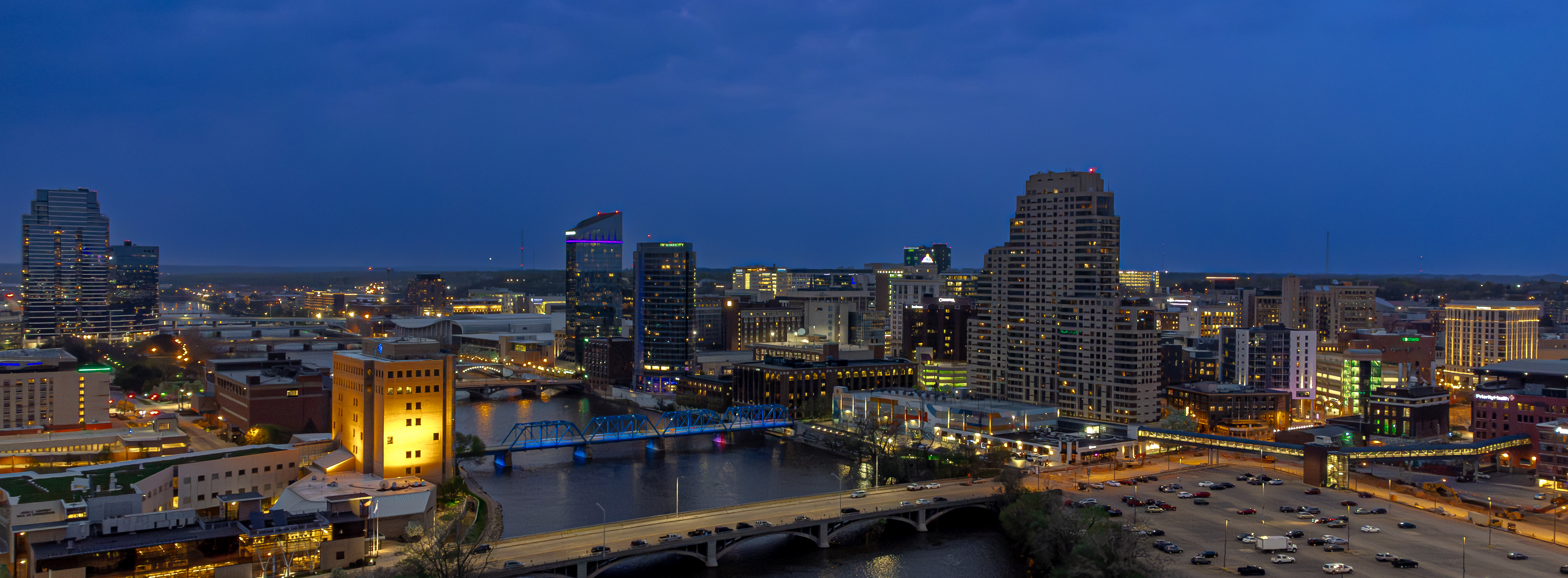
Grand Rapids, the second largest city in Michigan by population

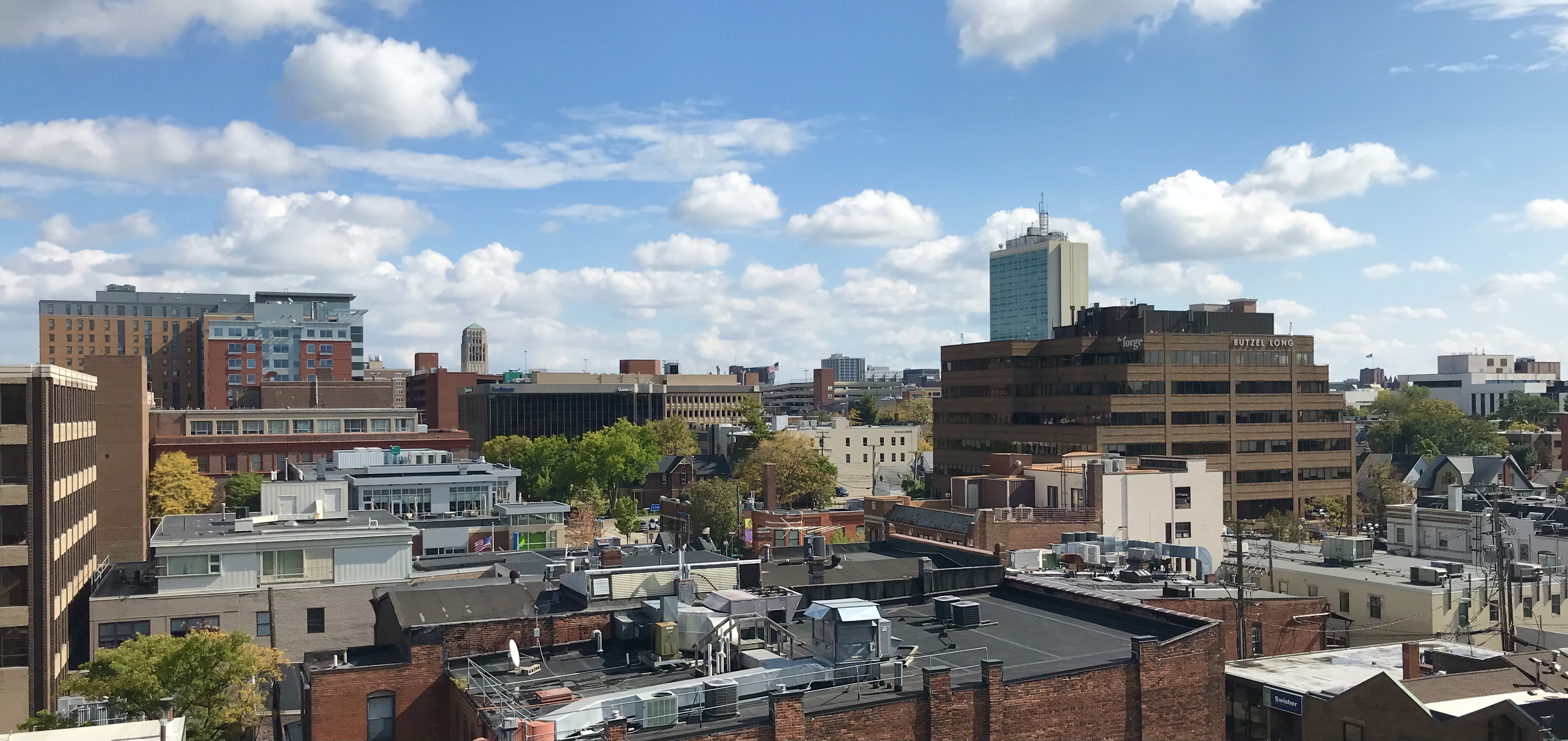
Ann Arbor, the fifth largest city in Michigan by population

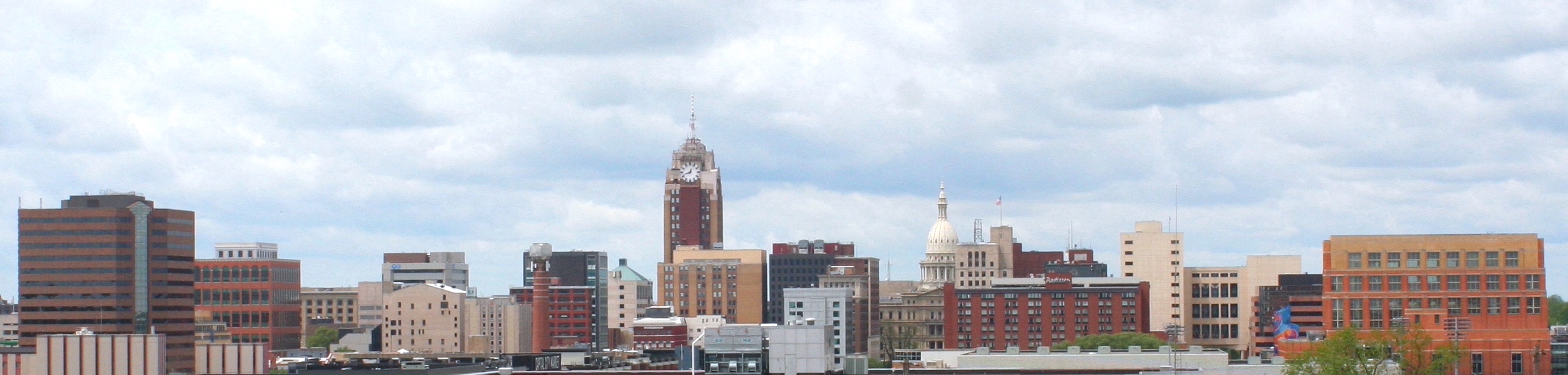
Lansing, the capital and sixth largest city in Michigan by population

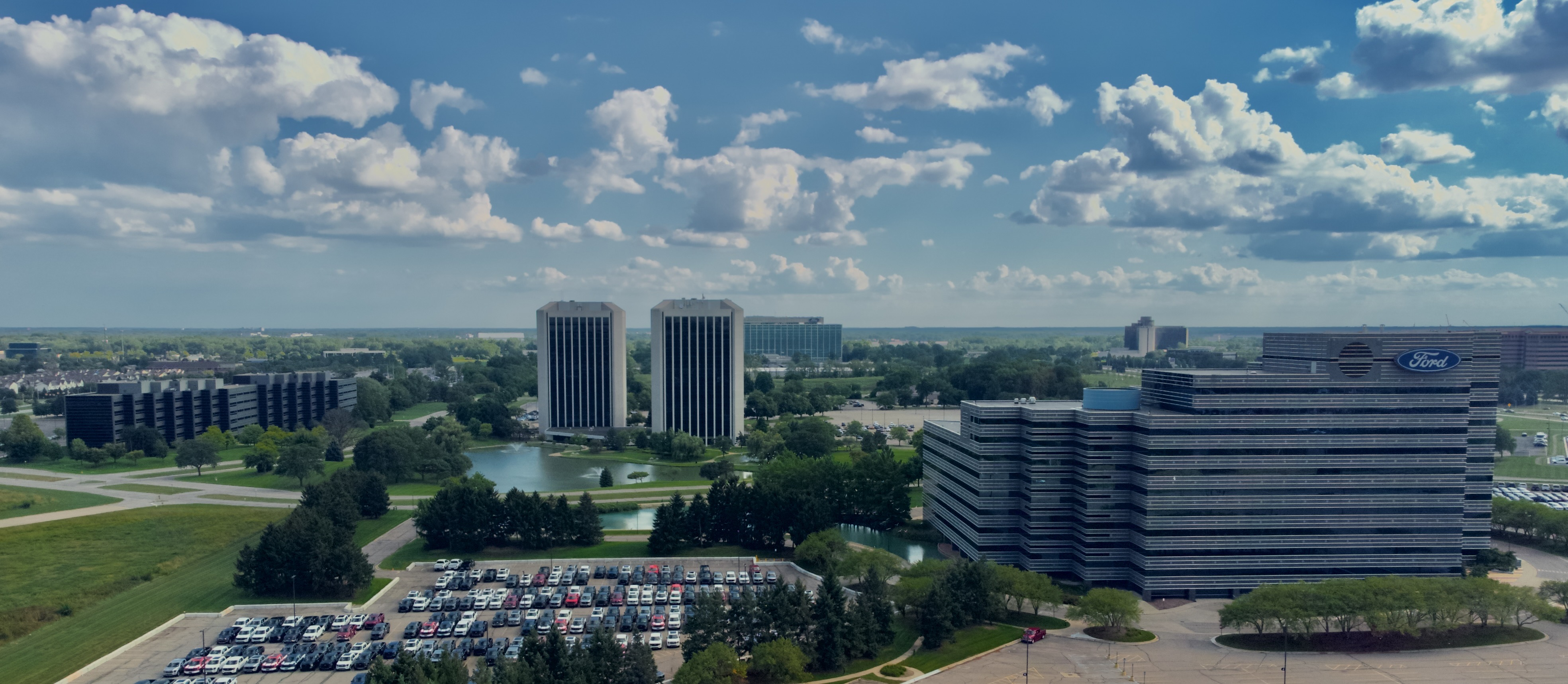
Dearborn, the seventh largest city in Michigan by population

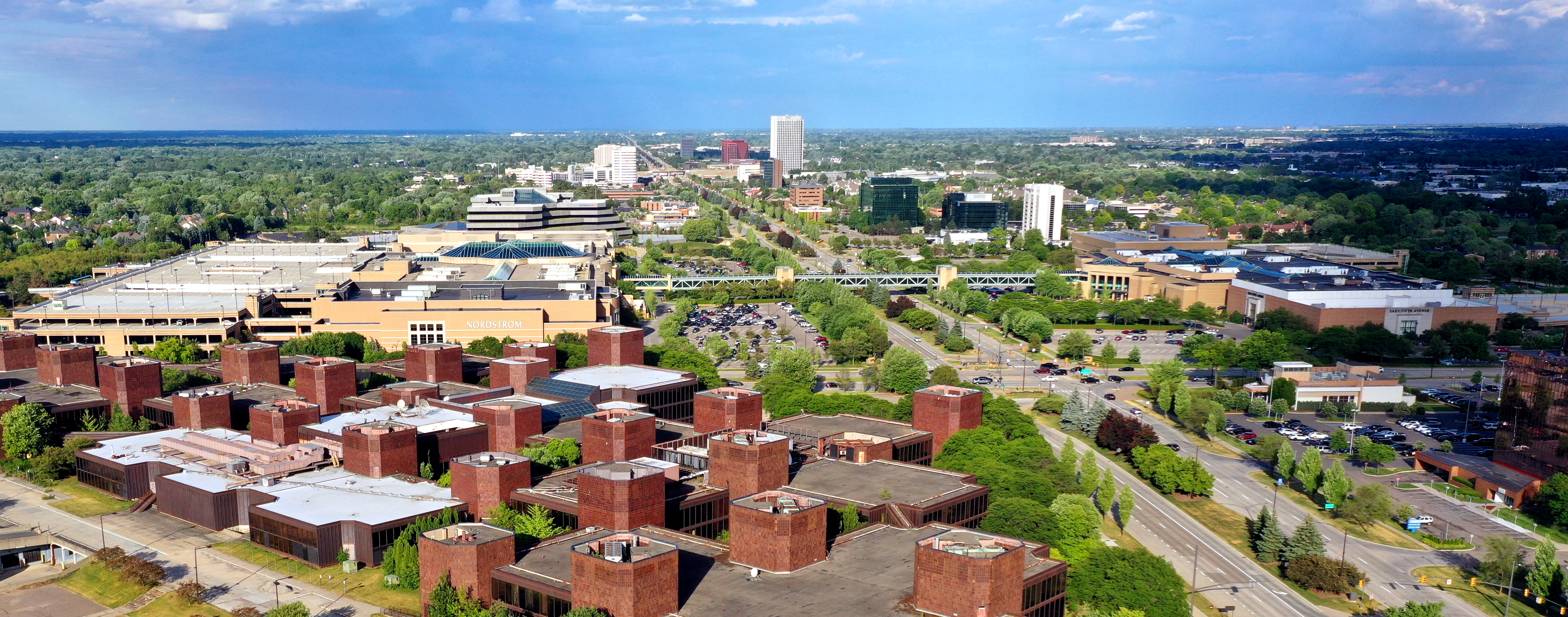
Troy, the twelfth largest city in Michigan by population

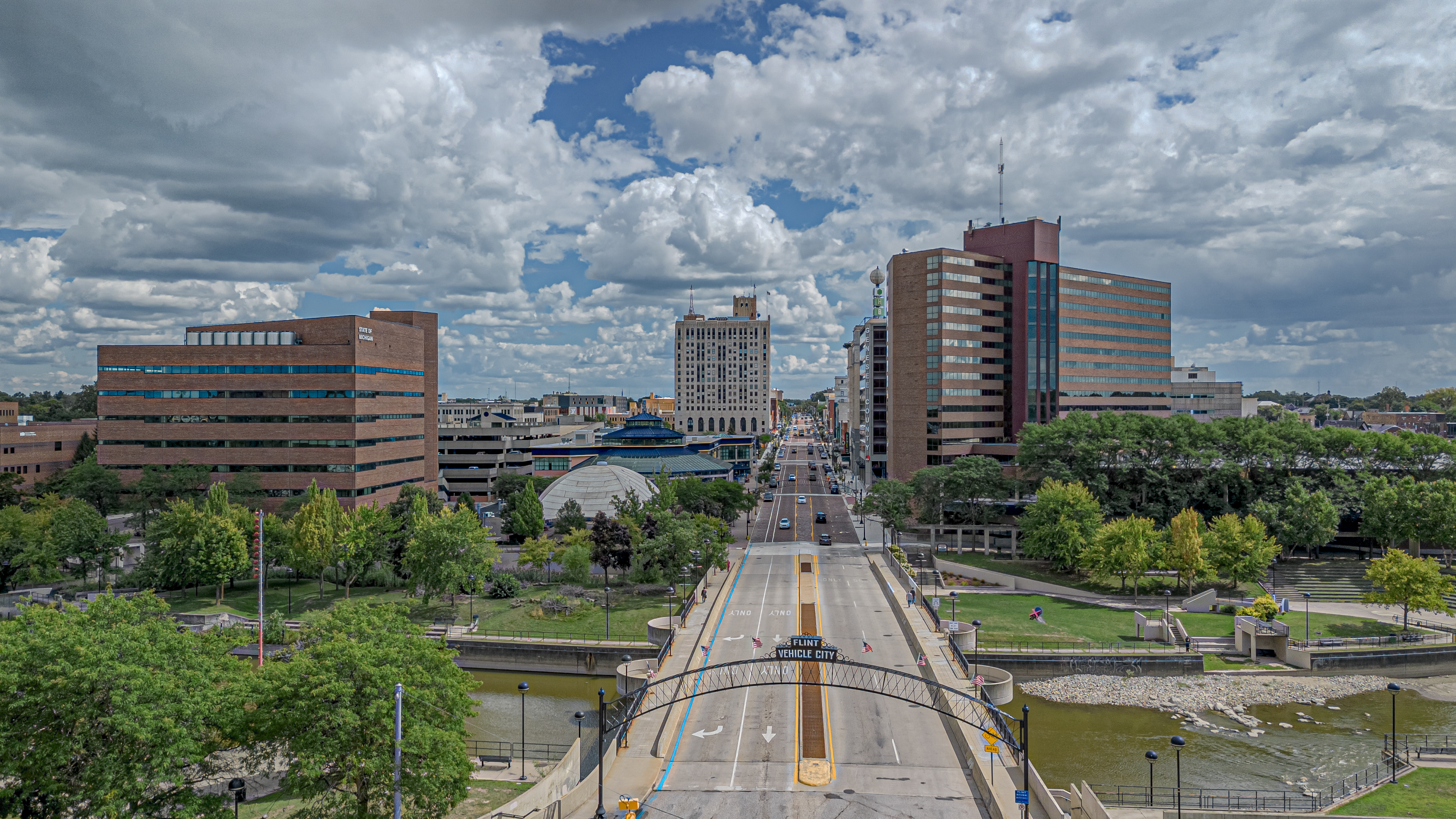
Flint, the fifteenth largest city in Michigan by population

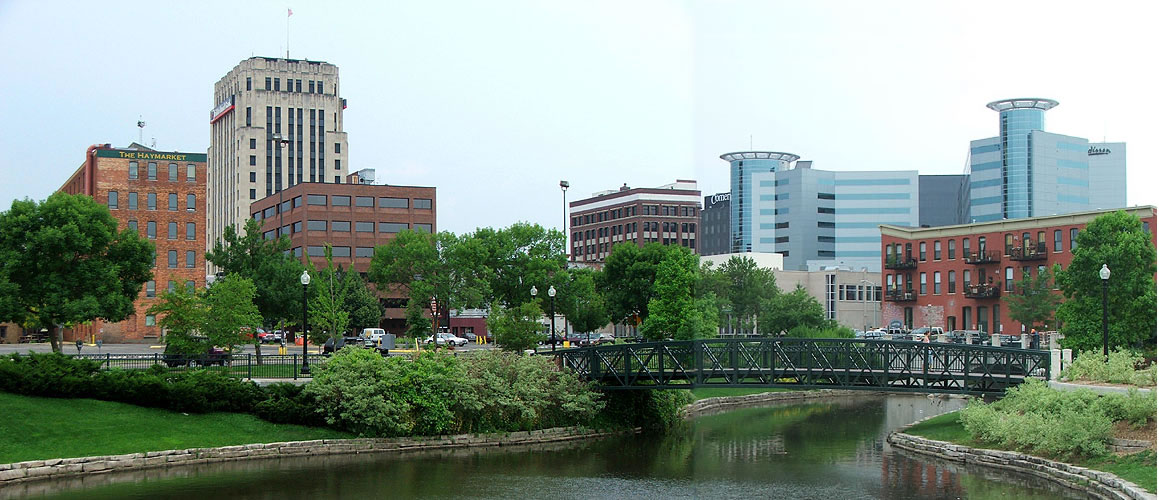
Kalamazoo, the twentieth largest city in Michigan by population
