= Hillman Community Schools =

School district in Michigan, United States

Address
- 26042 M-32 Hillman, Montmorency County, Michigan, 49746; United States

District information
- Grades: PreKindergarten–12
- Superintendent: Pamela Rader
- Schools: 2
- Budget: $7,030,000 2022–2023 expenditures
- NCES District ID: 2618360

Students and staff
- Students: 432 (2024–2025)
- Teachers: 30.46 (on an FTE basis) (2024–2025)
- Staff: 63.41 FTE (2024–2025)
- Student–teacher ratio: 14.18 (2024–2025)
- District mascot: Tigers

Other information
- Website: www.hillmanschools.com

Hillman Community Schools is a public school district in Northern Michigan. In Montmorency County, it serves Hillman, the townships of Hillman and Rust, and parts of Canada Creek Ranch and Montmorency Township. In Alpena County, it serves parts of the townships of Green and Wellington.

== History ==
Hillman Community Schools was organized in 1954 from the consolidation of smaller school districts in the area. Three new schools were then built, including two three-classroom schools in Montmorency and Rust Townships and a larger school in Hillman, which contained twelve grades. The Hillman school opened on January 3, 1956 and continues to be used as Hillman Elementary.

Voters passed an $8.435 million construction bond issue in 1997. The junior-senior high school has moved from Hillman School to a site at M-32 and Coombs Road.

== Schools ==
Schools in Hillman Community Schools district
School	Address	Notes
Hillman Community Junior/Senior High School	26042 M-32, Hillman	Grades 6-12.
Hillman Elementary	245 East Third Street, Hillman	Grades PreK-5
