= Rust Township, Michigan =

- Civil township
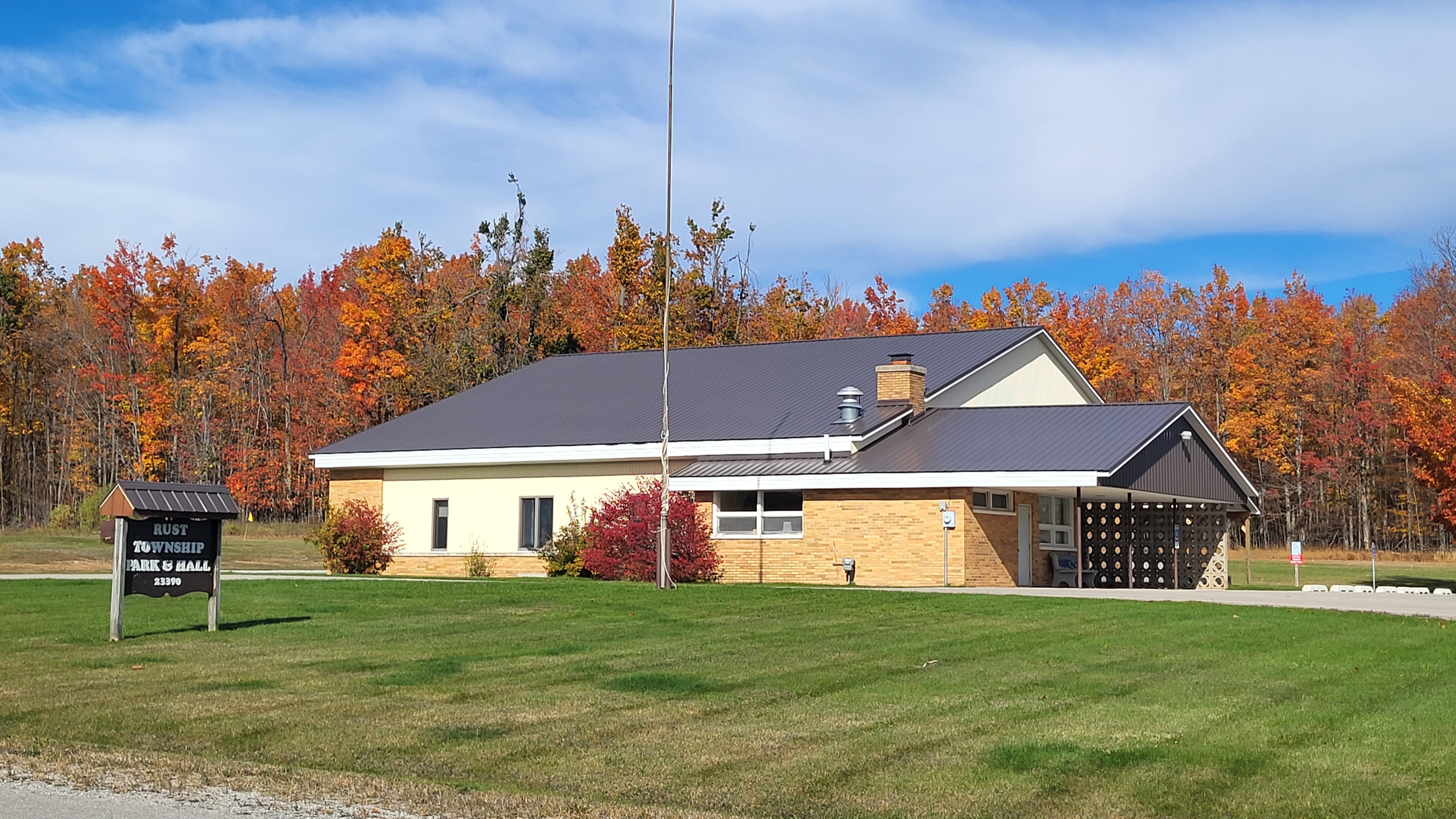
- Rust Township Park & Hall

- Location within Montmorency County

- Location within the state of Michigan Location within the United States
- Coordinates: 44°55′05″N 83°57′03″W
- Country: United States
- State: Michigan
- County: Montmorency
- Established: 1902

Government
  - Supervisor: Jonathan Schulze
  - Clerk: Carleen Klein

Area
  - Total: 71.91 sq mi (186.25 km^{2})
  - Land: 68.52 sq mi (177.47 km^{2})
  - Water: 3.39 sq mi (8.78 km^{2})
- Elevation: 784 ft (239 m)

Population (2020)
  - Total: 519
  - Density: 7.57/sq mi (2.92/km^{2})
- Time zone: UTC-5 (Eastern (EST))
  - Summer (DST): UTC-4 (EDT)
- ZIP code(s): 49746 (Hillman); 49709 (Atlanta); 48619 (Comins)
- Area code: 989
- FIPS code: 26-70380
- GNIS feature ID: 1627017
- Website: Official website

Rust Township is a civil township of Montmorency County in the U.S. state of Michigan. The population was 519 at the 2020 census.

== Geography ==
The township is in southeastern Montmorency County, bordered to the east by Alpena County, to the south by Oscoda County, and at its southeast corner by Alcona County. State highway M-32 crosses the northern part of the township, leading west to Atlanta, the county seat, and northeast to Hillman.

According to the U.S. Census Bureau, Rust Township has a total area of 71.9 square miles (186 km^{2}), of which 68.5 square miles (177 km^{2}) are land and 3.4 square miles (8.8 km^{2}), or 4.72%, are water. The township is in the watershed of the Thunder Bay River, which crosses its northwestern corner. Fletcher Pond and Turtle Lake are on the township's eastern border.

== Demographics ==
As of the census of 2000, there were 549 people, 218 households, and 166 families residing in the township. The population density was 8.0 per square mile (3.1/km^{2}). There were 432 housing units at an average density of 6.3 per square mile (2.4/km^{2}). The racial makeup of the township was 98.91% White, 0.18% Native American, and 0.91% from two or more races. Hispanic or Latino of any race were 0.55% of the population.

There were 218 households, out of which 24.8% had children under the age of 18 living with them, 66.1% were married couples living together, 6.0% had a female householder with no husband present, and 23.4% were non-families. 17.0% of all households were made up of individuals, and 10.6% had someone living alone who was 65 years of age or older. The average household size was 2.52 and the average family size was 2.82.

In the township the population was spread out, with 21.5% under the age of 18, 7.3% from 18 to 24, 22.2% from 25 to 44, 26.0% from 45 to 64, and 23.0% who were 65 years of age or older. The median age was 44 years. For every 100 females, there were 101.8 males. For every 100 females age 18 and over, there were 97.7 males.

The median income for a household in the township was $30,870, and the median income for a family was $31,908. Males had a median income of $30,268 versus $20,982 for females. The per capita income for the township was $15,129. About 11.0% of families and 12.2% of the population were below the poverty line, including 18.9% of those under age 18 and 3.2% of those age 65 or over.
