= Long Lake (Montmorency County, Michigan) =

Lake in the state of Michigan, United States

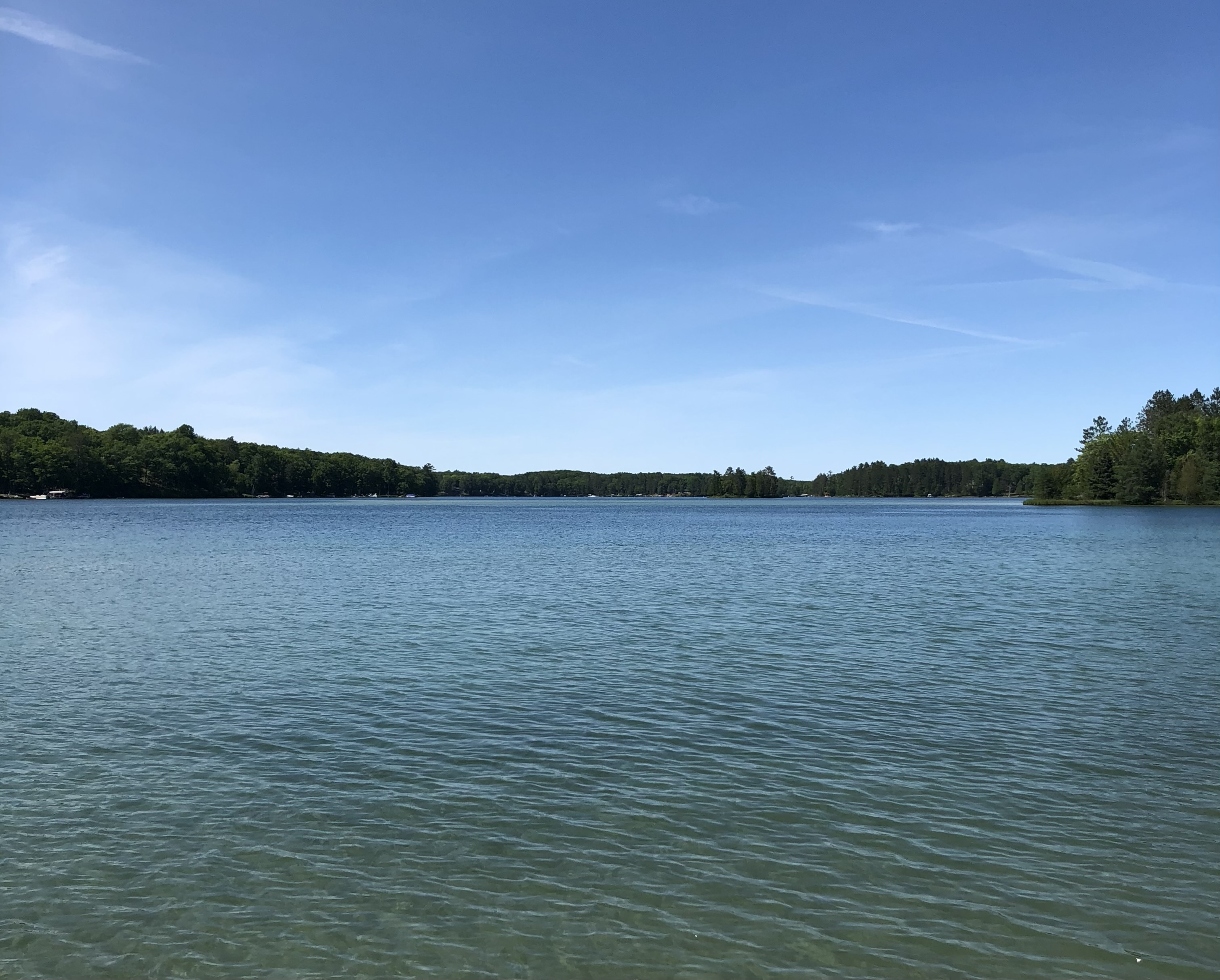
- View of Long Lake from the eastern shore

- Location within Michigan
- Location: Montmorency County, Michigan (Hillman & Montmorency townships)
- Coordinates: 45°07′33″N 83°58′21″W
- Type: Kettle lake
- Part of: Thunder Bay Watershed
- Primary inflows: Long Lake Creek
- Primary outflows: Little Brush Creek
- Basin countries: United States
- Max. length: 1.8 mi (2.9 km)
- Max. width: 0.4 mi (0.64 km)
- Surface area: 295 acres (119 ha)
- Max. depth: 90.0 ft (27.4 m)
- Residence time: 6.1 years
- Shore length^{1}: 5.7 mi (9.2 km)
- Surface elevation: 863 ft (263 m)
- Islands: Meltzer Island
- ^{1} Shore length is not a well-defined measure.

Long Lake is a 295-acre (119 ha) lake in northeastern Montmorency County, Michigan. The lake is primarily in Montmorency Township, although the southernmost portion is located in Hillman Township, as well as part of the Mackinaw State Forest. The nearest town is Hillman at about 6 miles (9.7 km) southeast of the lake.

== Features ==
Long Lake consists of two distinct sections divided by a 500-foot (152 m) channel. In the larger northern section of the lake sits a small island. Also in the north of the lake sits a small bay known as Ghost Bay due to the treacherous floor and taller trees surrounding the bay limiting sunlight.

The lake is a popular summer fishing and boating destination. Common fish in the lake include northern pike, bluegill, smallmouth bass, largemouth bass, rock bass, yellow perch, walleye, and very rarely rainbow trout. rainbow trout used to be stocked in the lake many years ago, so there's probably not many left.

== See also ==
- Thunder Bay River
- List of lakes in Michigan
