= Albert Township, Michigan =

- Civil township
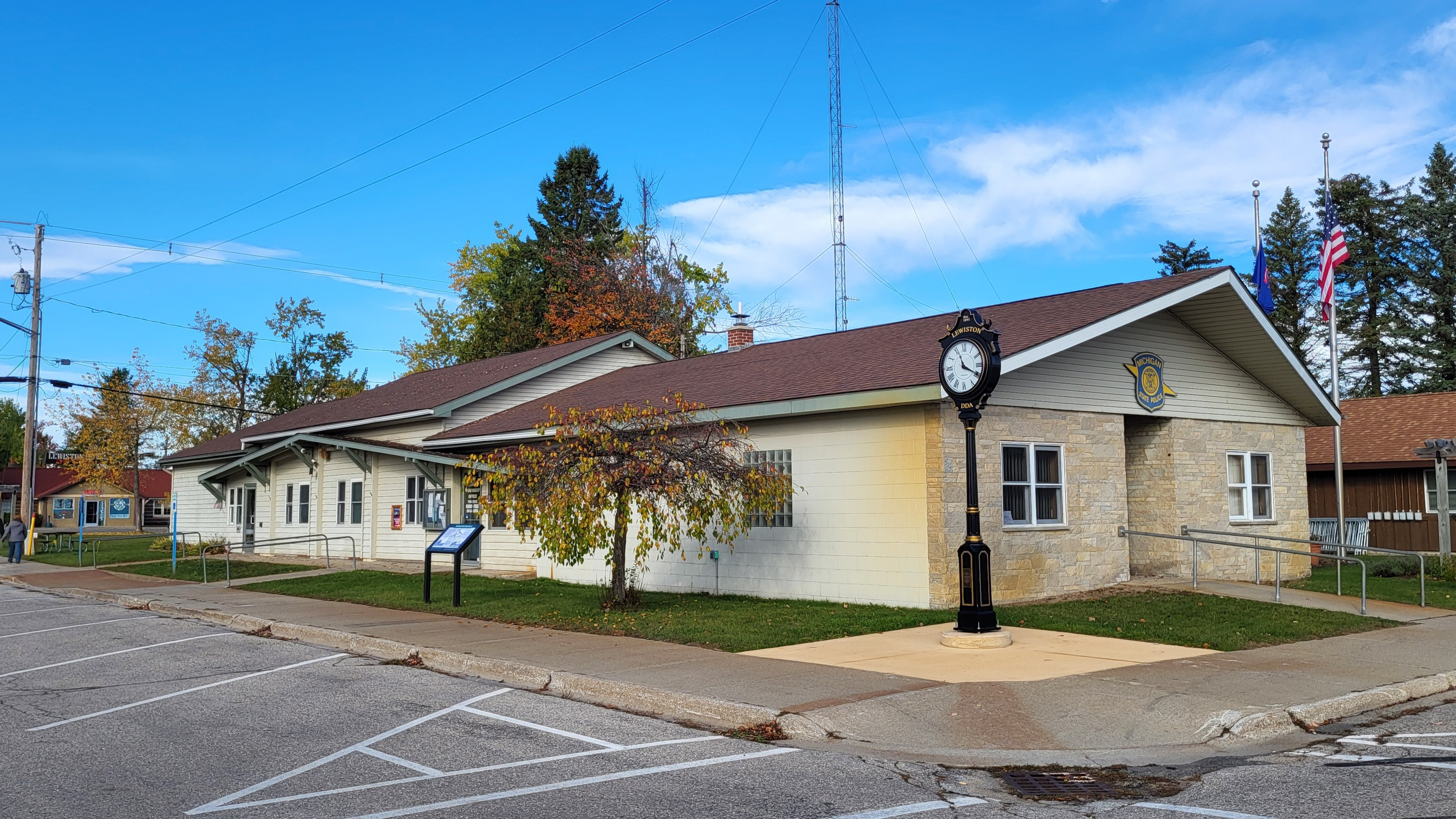
- Albert Township Hall in Lewiston

- Location within Montmorency County (red) and the administered CDP of Lewiston (pink)

- Location within the state of Michigan Location within the United States
- Coordinates: 44°53′21″N 84°16′40″W
- Country: United States
- State: Michigan
- County: Montmorency
- Established: 1883

Government
  - Supervisor: Michael Szukhent
  - Clerk: Sandy Raffin

Area
  - Total: 70.36 sq mi (182.23 km^{2})
  - Land: 65.65 sq mi (170.03 km^{2})
  - Water: 4.70 sq mi (12.17 km^{2})
- Elevation: 1,257 ft (383 m)

Population (2020)
  - Total: 2,453
  - Density: 37.4/sq mi (14.4/km^{2})
- Time zone: UTC-5 (Eastern (EST))
  - Summer (DST): UTC-4 (EDT)
- ZIP code(s): 49756 (Lewiston); 49709 (Atlanta); 49751 (Johannesburg)
- Area code: 989
- FIPS code: 26-00940
- GNIS feature ID: 1625812
- Website: Official website

Albert Township is a civil township of Montmorency County in the U.S. state of Michigan. As of the 2020 census, the township population was 2,453.

== History ==
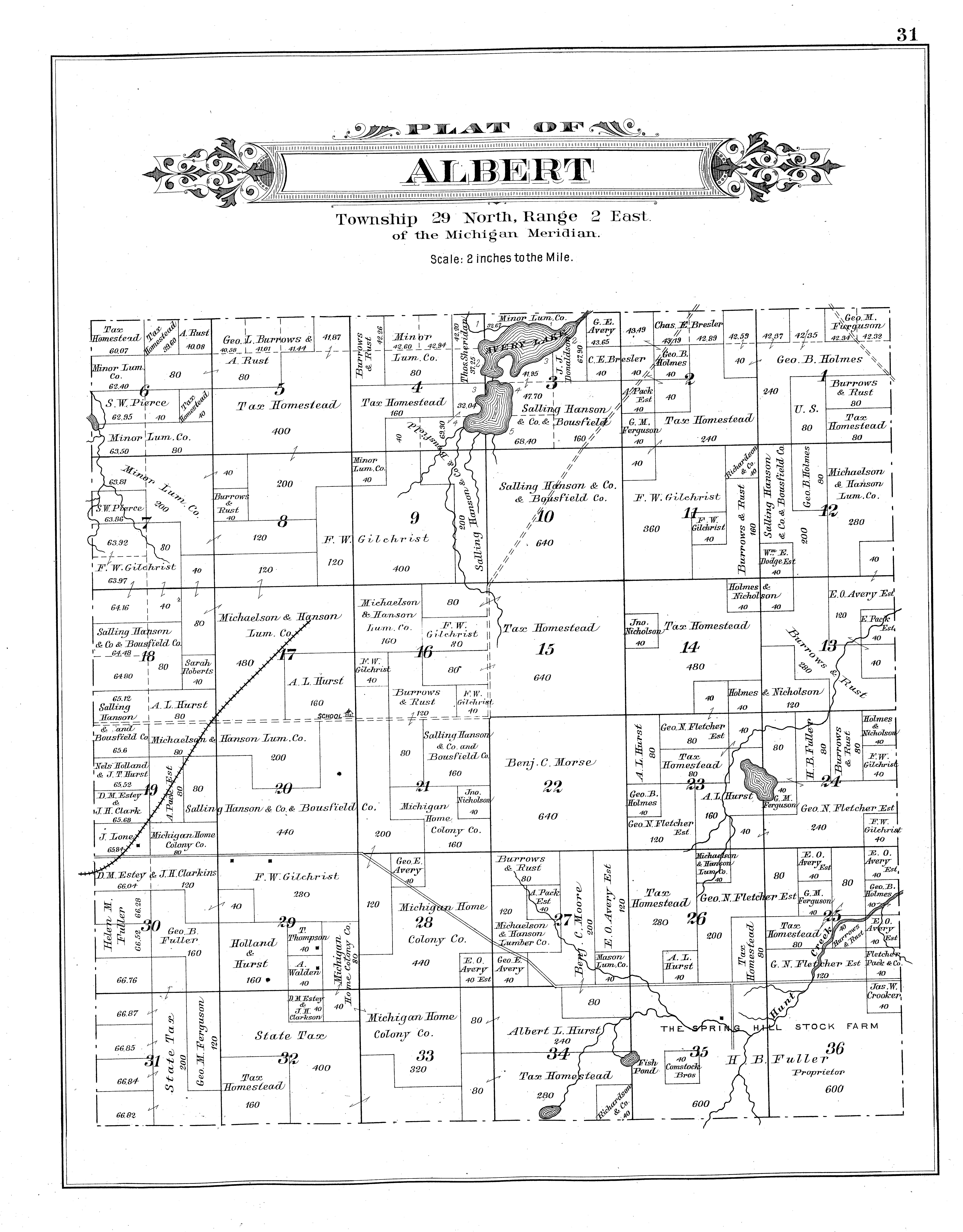
1903 plat map of Albert Township, Montmorency County, Michigan

Albert Township was organized March 13, 1883, originally including the South 1/2 of Township 30 North, Range 1 East which was released in 1893 to form Vienna Township. Albert Township public schools were established in 1891.

== Geography ==
The township is in southwestern Montmorency County, bordered to the south by Oscoda County, to the west by Otsego County, and at its southwest corner by Crawford County. The unincorporated community of Lewiston is in the southwest part of the township; the Lewiston post office (ZIP Code 49756) serves most of the township. Atlanta, the Montmorency county seat, is 16 miles (26 km) by road to the northeast.

Albert Township is composed of two survey townships: Township 29 North, Range 1 East and Township 29 North, Range 2 East, Michigan Meridian.

According to the U.S. Census Bureau, Albert Township has a total area of 70.4 square miles (182 km^{2}), of which 65.7 square miles (170 km^{2}) are land and 4.7 square miles (12 km^{2}), or 6.69%, are water. Several lakes are in the township, most notably East and West Twin Lake in the southwest, as well as Big Wolf Lake in the south and Avery Lake in the northeast.

== Communities ==
Albert Township is home to Lewiston, a census-designated place and unincorporated community.

== Demographics ==
As of the 2000 census, there were 2,695 people, 1,229 households, and 822 families residing in the township, with a population density of 40.9 per square mile (15.8/km^{2}). There were 2,603 housing units at an average density of 39.6 per square mile (15.3/km^{2}). The racial makeup of the township was 98.37% White, 0.15% African American, 0.26% Native American, 0.04% Asian, 0.33% from other races, and 0.85% from two or more races. Hispanic or Latino of any race were 0.89% of the population.

Of the 1,229 households, 19.6% had children under the age of 18 living with them, 59.0% were married couples living together, 5.7% had a female householder with no husband present, and 33.1% were non-families. 30.3% of all households were made up of individuals, and 19.2% had someone living alone who was 65 years of age or older. The average household size was 2.19 and the average family size was 2.68.

In the township, the population was spread out, with 19.0% under the age of 18, 5.1% from 18 to 24, 19.7% from 25 to 44, 28.5% from 45 to 64, and 27.8% who were 65 years of age or older. The median age was 50 years. For every 100 females, there were 97.6 males; for every 100 females age 18 and over, there were 96.5 males.

The median income for a household in the township was $30,445, and the median income for a family was $35,597. Males had a median income of $33,795 versus $18,241 for females. The per capita income for the township was $18,206. About 7.5% of families and 10.7% of the population were below the poverty line, including 18.3% of those under age 18 and 5.4% of those age 65 or over.
