= Vienna Corners, Michigan =

- Unincorporated community
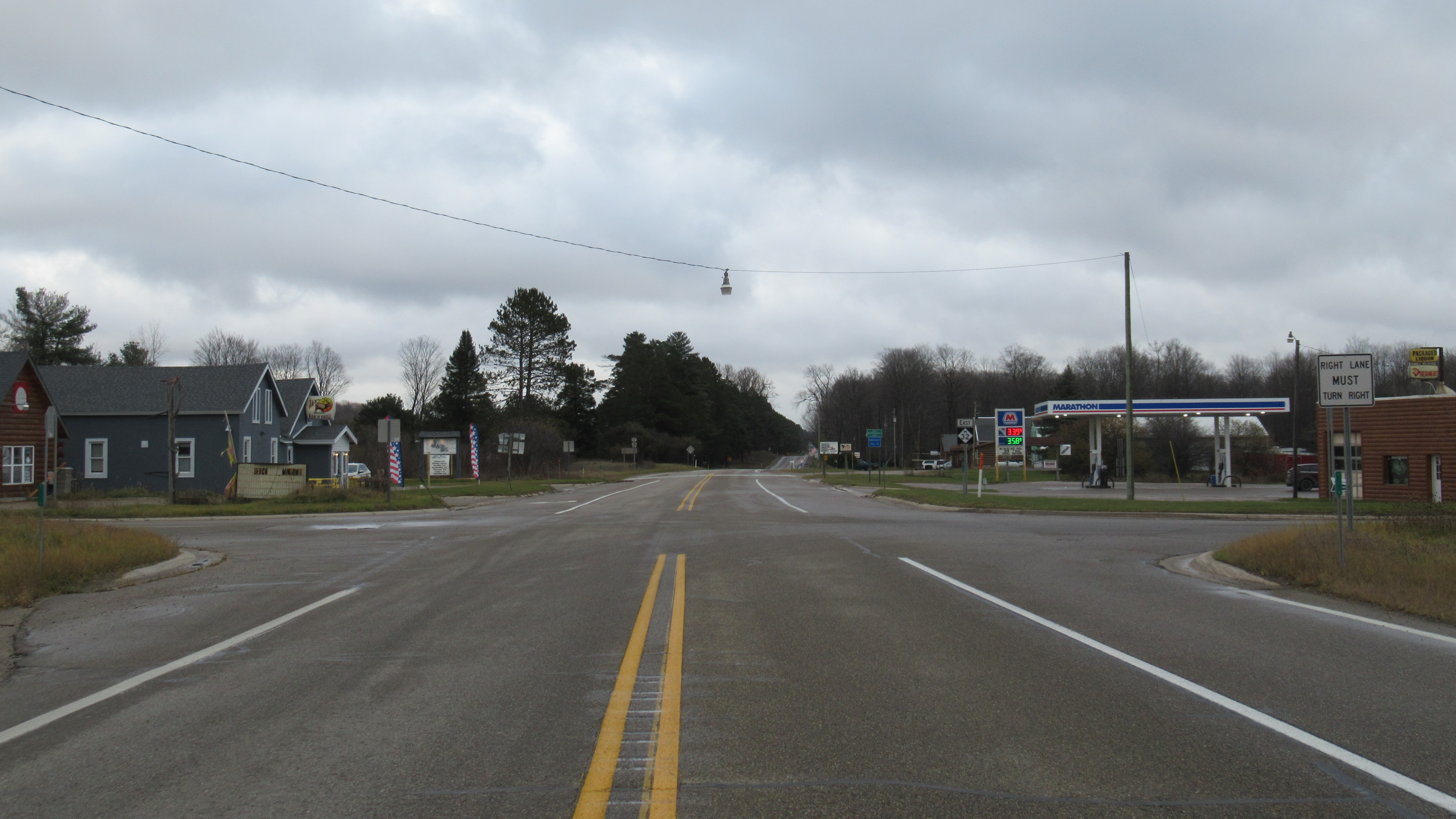
- Looking east along M-32

- Location within the state of Michigan Location within the United States
- Coordinates: 44°58′13″N 84°22′15″W
- Country: United States
- State: Michigan
- Counties: Montmorency and Otsego
- Townships: Charlton and Vienna
- Elevation: 133 ft (41 m)
- Time zone: UTC-5 (Eastern (EST))
  - Summer (DST): UTC-4 (EDT)
- ZIP code(s): 49751 (Johannesburg)
- Area code: 989
- GNIS feature ID: 1615579

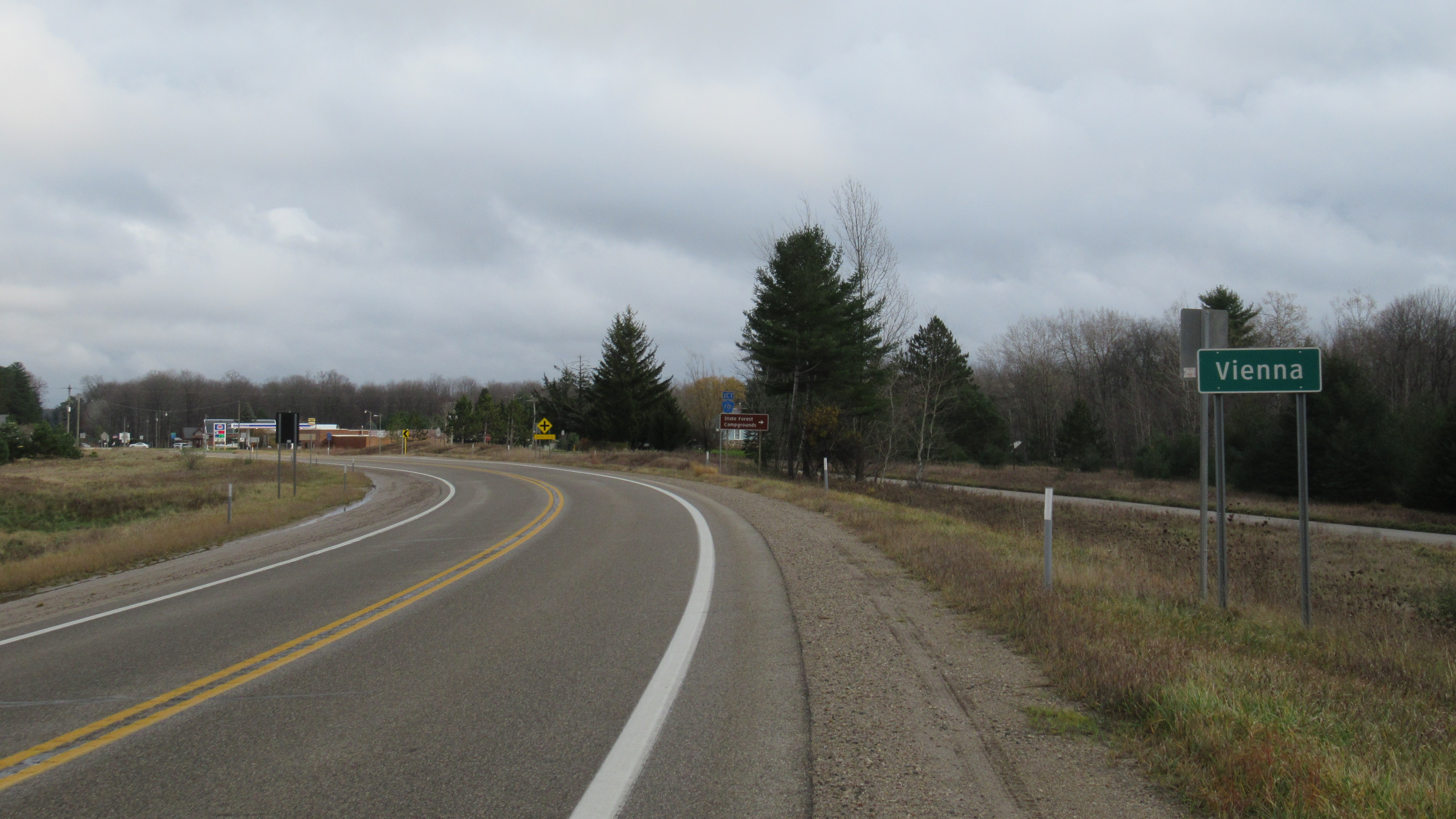
Road signage looking east along M-32

Vienna Corners is an unincorporated community in the U.S. state of Michigan. The community is centered along M-32 on the county line with Otsego County on the west and Montmorency County on the east. The Otsego County portion of the community is within Charlton Township, while the Montmorency County portion is within Vienna Township. As an unincorporated community, Vienna Corners has no legally defined boundaries or population statistics of its own.

The community began in 1877 as a lumbering community and received a train depot along the Michigan Central Railroad under the name Vienna Junction. A post office named Vienna opened on February 23, 1887 and remained in operation until December 31, 1913.
