= Avery Township, Michigan =

- Civil township
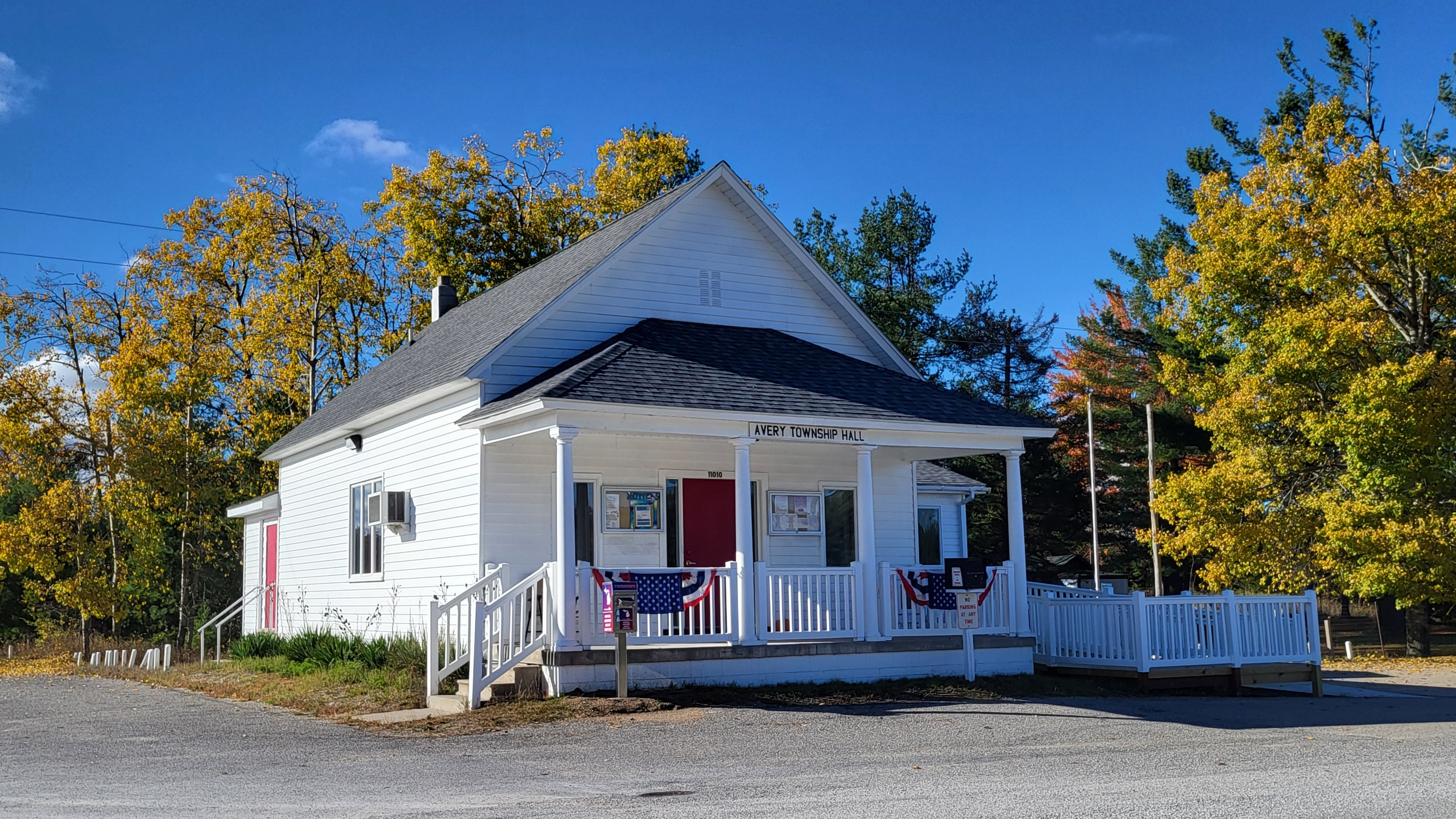
- Avery Township Hall

- Location within Montmorency County (red) and a portion of the administered CDP of Atlanta (pink)

- Location within the state of Michigan Location within the United States
- Coordinates: 44°58′32″N 84°04′23″W
- Country: United States
- State: Michigan
- County: Montmorency
- Established: 1881

Government
  - Supervisor: Thomas Seymour
  - Clerk: Rebecca Smith

Area
  - Total: 35.32 sq mi (91.48 km^{2})
  - Land: 35.02 sq mi (90.70 km^{2})
  - Water: 0.30 sq mi (0.78 km^{2})
- Elevation: 958 ft (292 m)

Population (2020)
  - Total: 662
  - Density: 18.9/sq mi (7.3/km^{2})
- Time zone: UTC-5 (Eastern (EST))
  - Summer (DST): UTC-4 (EDT)
- ZIP code(s): 49709 (Atlanta); 49746 (Hillman)
- Area code: 989
- FIPS code: 26-04580
- GNIS feature ID: 1625870
- Website: Official website

Avery Township is a civil township of Montmorency County in the U.S. state of Michigan. At the 2020 census, the township's population was 662.

== Geography ==
The township is in central Montmorency County, just east of Atlanta, the county seat. State highways M-32 and M-33 cross the township. The two highways lead west together into Atlanta and cross most of the township before splitting on the east side of the township. M-32 continues east to Hillman and Alpena, while M-33 leads south to Mio.

According to the U.S. Census Bureau, the township has a total area of 35.3 square miles (91 km^{2}), of which 35.0 square miles (91 km^{2}) are land and 0.3 square miles (0.8 km^{2}), or 0.84%, are water. The township is drained by the Thunder Bay River, which flows eastward to Lake Huron at Alpena.

== Demographics ==
As of the census of 2000, there were 717 people, 309 households, and 218 families residing in the township. The population density was 20.5 inhabitants per square mile (7.9/km^{2}). There were 646 housing units at an average density of 18.4 per square mile (7.1/km^{2}). The racial makeup of the township was 97.07% White, 1.53% African American, 0.84% Native American, and 0.56% from two or more races. Hispanic or Latino of any race were 0.42% of the population.

There were 309 households, out of which 22.0% had children under the age of 18 living with them, 59.5% were married couples living together, 7.1% had a female householder with no husband present, and 29.4% were non-families. 23.9% of all households were made up of individuals, and 14.6% had someone living alone who was 65 years of age or older. The average household size was 2.32 and the average family size was 2.73.

In the township the population was spread out, with 20.6% under the age of 18, 4.5% from 18 to 24, 20.9% from 25 to 44, 33.2% from 45 to 64, and 20.8% who were 65 years of age or older. The median age was 48 years. For every 100 females, there were 97.0 males. For every 100 females age 18 and over, there were 93.5 males.

The median income for a household in the township was $27,723, and the median income for a family was $28,261. Males had a median income of $24,464 versus $15,833 for females. The per capita income for the township was $14,677. About 11.0% of families and 17.4% of the population were below the poverty line, including 33.1% of those under age 18 and 10.9% of those age 65 or over.
