= Lila Neuenfelt =

Michigan judge

Lila M. Neuenfelt
- Born: March 2, 1902; Lewiston, Michigan
- Died: October 8, 1981 (aged 79); Fort Lauderdale, Florida
- Education: University of Detroit School of Law
- Occupations: Lawyer, judge

Lila Neuenfelt (March 2, 1902 – October 8, 1981) was the first woman circuit court judge in Michigan and the youngest woman in the U.S. to become an attorney.

== Early life and education ==
Lila Neuenfelt was born on March 2, 1902, in Lewiston, Michigan, one of six children. Neuenfelt graduated from Highland Park High School in 1919 and from the University of Detroit School of Law in 1922. She needed to wait six months to turn 21 before she could be admitted to Michigan's state bar. She became the youngest woman lawyer in the United States at the time.

== Career ==
In 1926, Neuenfelt was a clerk for judge Leo Schaefer in Springwells, village; Schaefer suggested she run for judge. Upon winning election, she became the youngest and first woman justice of the peace in Michigan, earning extensive news coverage at the time. The Detroit Free Press ran a full-page article with the headline "Girl Judge’s Small, Soft Voice Awes 'Bad Men'". However, Neuenfelt didn't wanted to be recognized as a female judge, stating that gender "makes no difference with the administration of the law". As she started to compete with Schaefer for future votes, they developed an adversarial relationship. In 1929, Neuenfelt ran a recall election against Schaefer, who in turn planted illegal alcohol in the back of her car. In 1932, both Neuenfelt and Schaefer ran for congress against each other, with neither winning.

In 1935, upon running for re-election, the corporate counsel of Dearborn ruled that she would need to run under her married name; Neuenfelt successfully petitioned the court and the state attorney general, and continued to use her maiden name.

In 1940, Neuenfelt issued a ruling declaring an anti-union ordinance that prohibited the distribution of handbills unconstitutional. The Ford Motor Company appealed but her ruling was upheld.

In 1941, Neuenfelt was elected to the Michigan Circuit Court; she became Michigan's first female circuit court judge. Neuenfelt was once approached by a union member over an injunction she had issued, and responded by threatening Teamsters President Jimmy Hoffa with her "16 gauge automatic shotgun". Hoffa later endorsed Neuenfelt in her following election.

Neuenfelt served as a circuit court judge in Michigan until her retirement in 1968.

== Death and legacy ==
Neuenfelt died in Fort Lauderdale, Florida on October 8, 1981, at the age of 79.

She is remembered for her accomplishments in a time when there were very limited opportunities for women in law, and noted for becoming a lawyer only two years after the 19th Amendment was passed.

Neuenfelt was a mentor to Cornelia Kennedy, who served as a judge on the United States Court of Appeals for the Sixth Circuit.

In 2021, Neuenfelt was inducted into the Michigan Women's Hall of Fame in recognition of being the first female circuit judge in Michigan.
