= Hillman Township, Michigan =

- Civil township
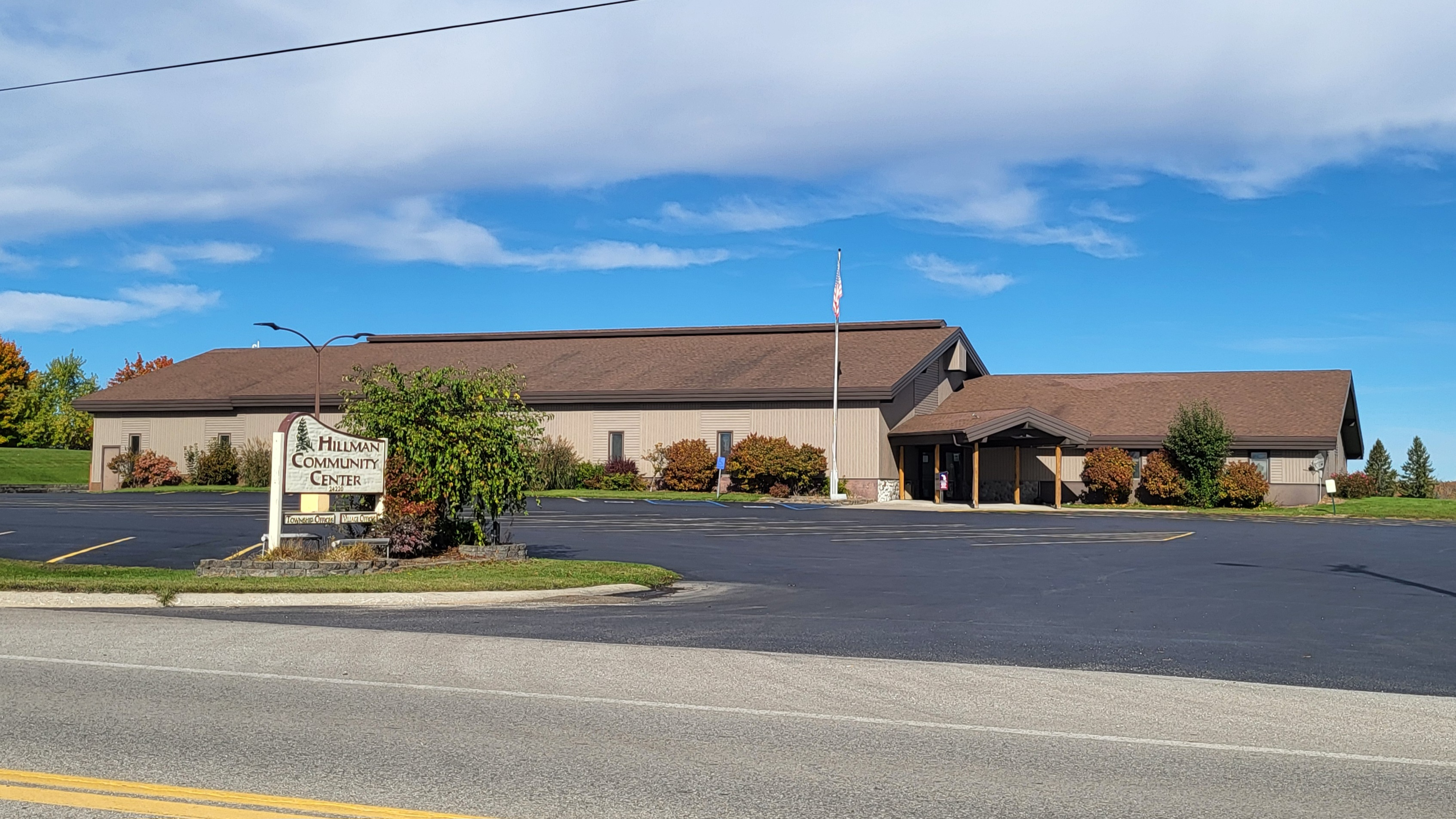
- Hillman Community Center in Hillman

- Location within Montmorency County (red) and the administered village of Hillman (pink)

- Location within the state of Michigan Location within the United States
- Coordinates: 45°04′03″N 83°58′59″W
- Country: United States
- State: Michigan
- County: Montmorency
- Established: 1881

Government
  - Supervisor: John Burr
  - Clerk: Kelli Ableidinger

Area
  - Total: 69.02 sq mi (178.76 km^{2})
  - Land: 67.63 sq mi (175.16 km^{2})
  - Water: 1.39 sq mi (3.60 km^{2})
- Elevation: 860 ft (262 m)

Population (2020)
  - Total: 2,009
  - Density: 29.7/sq mi (11.5/km^{2})
- Time zone: UTC-5 (Eastern (EST))
  - Summer (DST): UTC-4 (EDT)
- ZIP code(s): 49746 (Hillman); 49709 (Atlanta)
- Area code: 989
- FIPS code: 26-38400
- GNIS feature ID: 1626473
- Website: Official website

Hillman Township is a civil township of Montmorency County in the U.S. state of Michigan. The population was 2,009 at the 2020 census, 604 of whom lived in the village of Hillman within the township.

== Geography ==
The township is in eastern Montmorency County, bordered to the east by Alpena County. The village of Hillman is in the eastern part of the township, extending slightly into Alpena County. State highway M-32 crosses the southeast part of the township, passing through the southern part of Hillman village. The highway leads west to Atlanta, the Montmorency county seat, and east to Alpena on Lake Huron.

According to the U.S. Census Bureau, Hillman Township has a total area of 69.0 square miles (179 km^{2}), of which 67.6 square miles (175 km^{2}) are land and 1.4 square miles (3.6 km^{2}), or 1.99%, are water. It is drained by the Thunder Bay River, which crosses the southeast part of the township on its way to Lake Huron.

== Demographics ==
As of the census of 2000, there were 2,267 people, 916 households, and 606 families residing in the township. The population density was 33.5 inhabitants per square mile (12.9/km^{2}). There were 1,635 housing units at an average density of 24.2 per square mile (9.3/km^{2}). The racial makeup of the township was 98.81% White, 0.04% African American, 0.49% Native American, 0.13% Asian, 0.04% from other races, and 0.49% from two or more races. Hispanic or Latino of any race were 0.75% of the population.

There were 916 households, out of which 26.0% had children under the age of 18 living with them, 53.8% were married couples living together, 8.5% had a female householder with no husband present, and 33.8% were non-families. 29.0% of all households were made up of individuals, and 16.2% had someone living alone who was 65 years of age or older. The average household size was 2.36 and the average family size was 2.88.

In the township the population was spread out, with 21.8% under the age of 18, 6.8% from 18 to 24, 21.0% from 25 to 44, 26.7% from 45 to 64, and 23.6% who were 65 years of age or older. The median age was 45 years. For every 100 females, there were 92.1 males. For every 100 females age 18 and over, there were 88.5 males.

The median income for a household in the township was $27,011, and the median income for a family was $32,560. Males had a median income of $30,515 versus $19,911 for females. The per capita income for the township was $14,660. About 10.6% of families and 11.8% of the population were below the poverty line, including 12.1% of those under age 18 and 13.4% of those age 65 or over.
