= Vienna Township, Montmorency County, Michigan =

Vienna Township, Michigan
- Civil township
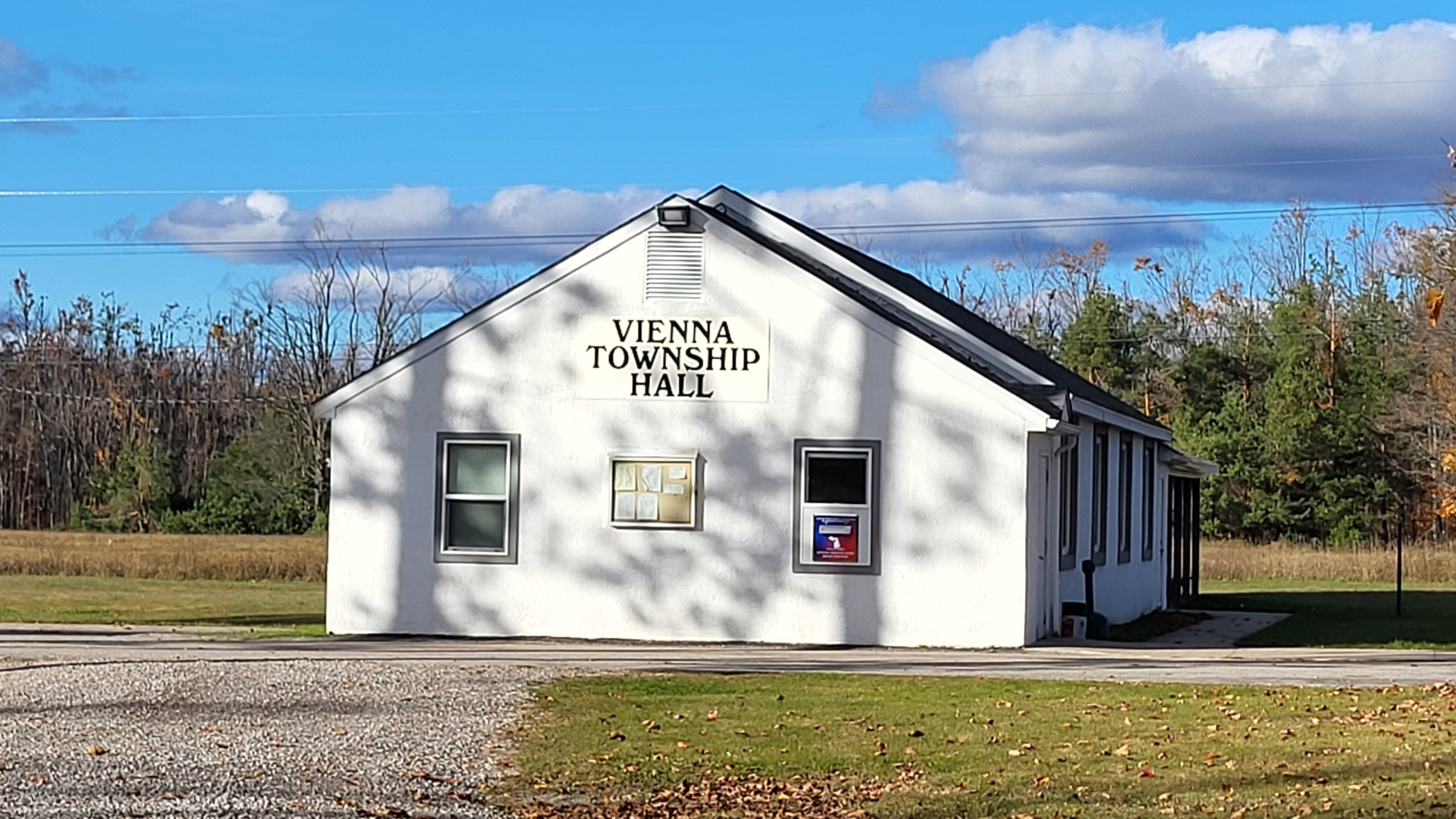
- Vienna Township Hall

- Location within Montmorency County

- Location within the state of Michigan Location within the United States
- Coordinates: 45°01′35″N 84°18′42″W
- Country: United States
- State: Michigan
- County: Montmorency
- Established: 1893

Government
  - Supervisor: Cheryl Klein
  - Clerk: Elaine Dixon

Area
  - Total: 69.37 sq mi (179.67 km^{2})
  - Land: 69.10 sq mi (178.97 km^{2})
  - Water: 0.27 sq mi (0.70 km^{2})
- Elevation: 965 ft (294 m)

Population (2020)
  - Total: 535
  - Density: 7.74/sq mi (2.99/km^{2})
- Time zone: UTC-5 (Eastern (EST))
  - Summer (DST): UTC-4 (EDT)
- ZIP code(s): 49709 (Atlanta); 49751 (Johannesburg); 49756 (Lewiston)
- Area code: 989
- FIPS code: 26-82420
- GNIS feature ID: 1627202

Vienna Township is a civil township of Montmorency County in the U.S. state of Michigan. The population was 535 at the 2020 census.

== History ==
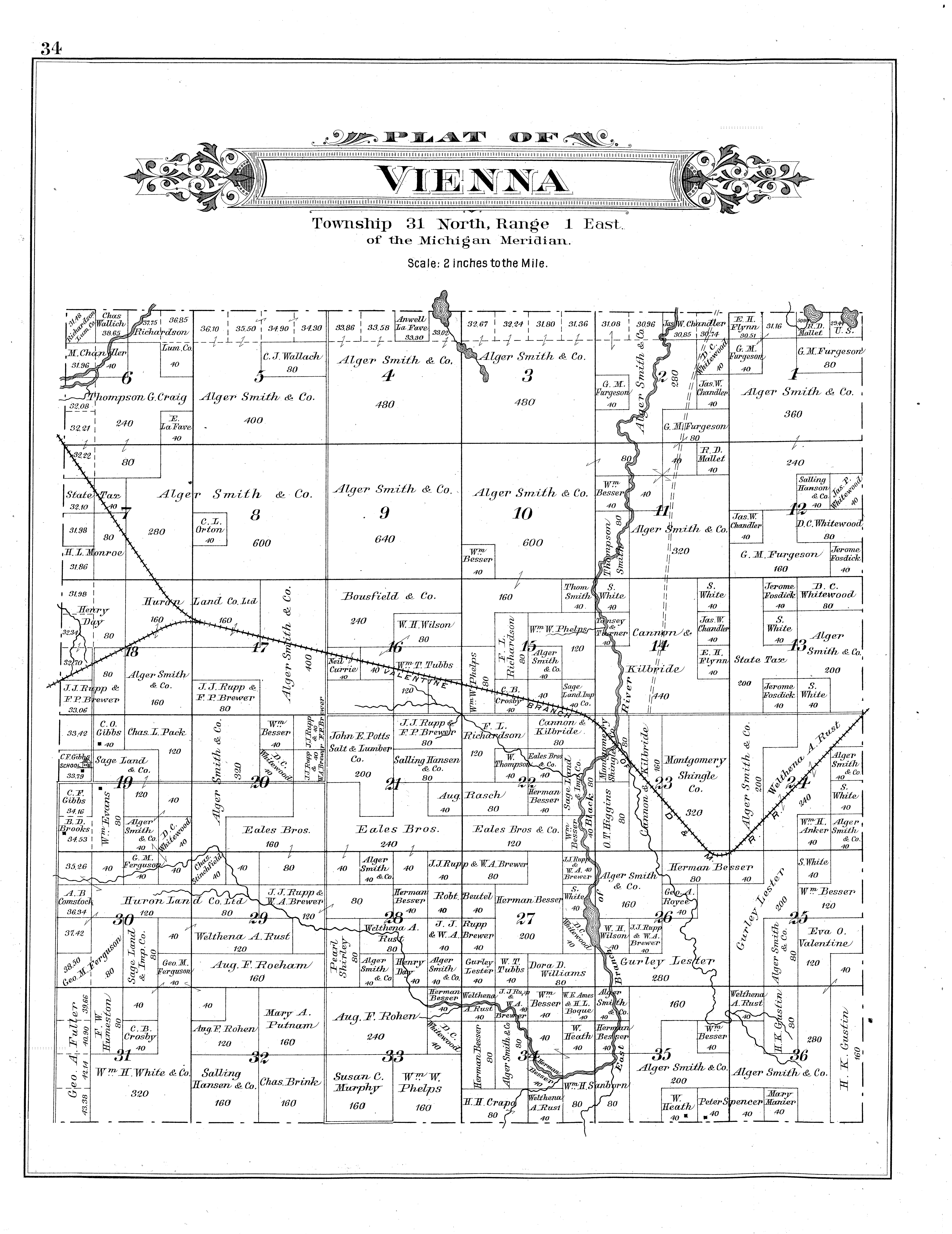
Plat map of Vienna Township, Montmorency County, Michigan (1903), Page 1 depicting Township 31 North Range 1 East

Vienna Township, first spelled "Vianna", was organized in 1893. Public schools were authorized in 1895. In 1899, the former Wheatland Township was attached to Vienna Township.

== Geography ==
The township is in western Montmorency County, bordered to the west by Otsego County. State highway M-32 crosses the southern part of the township, leading east to Atlanta, the county seat, and west to Gaylord. Vienna Township includes two surey townships, Township 30 North, Range 1 East and Township 31 North, Range 1 East, Michigan Meridian.

According to the U.S. Census Bureau, the township has a total area of 69.4 square miles (180 km^{2}), of which 69.1 square miles (179 km^{2}) are land and 0.3 square miles (0.8 km^{2}), or 0.39%, are water. The northern part of the township is drained by the East Branch of the Black River, while the southeastern part is drained by headwater tributaries of the Thunder Bay River.

== Demographics ==
At the 2000 census, there were 572 people, 233 households and 171 families residing in the township. The population density was 8.3 per square mile (3.2/km^{2}). There were 559 housing units at an average density of 8.1 per square mile (3.1/km^{2}). The racial makeup of the township was 98.43% White, 0.17% Native American, and 1.40% from two or more races. Hispanic or Latino of any race were 0.35% of the population.

There were 233 households, of which 26.2% had children under the age of 18 living with them, 63.5% were married couples living together, 4.7% had a female householder with no husband present, and 26.6% were non-families. 23.2% of all households were made up of individuals, and 8.2% had someone living alone who was 65 years of age or older. The average household size was 2.45 and the average family size was 2.90.

24.1% of the population were under the age of 18, 5.9% from 18 to 24, 23.3% from 25 to 44, 30.8% from 45 to 64, and 15.9% who were 65 years of age or older. The median age was 43 years. For every 100 females, there were 108.8 males. For every 100 females age 18 and over, there were 107.7 males.

The median household income was $35,909, and the median family income was $42,222. Males had a median income of $27,188 versus $18,375 for females. The per capita income for the township was $18,923. About 7.7% of families and 11.6% of the population were below the poverty line, including 23.8% of those under age 18 and 11.7% of those age 65 or over.
