= Black River (Cheboygan County) =

River in U.S. state of Michigan

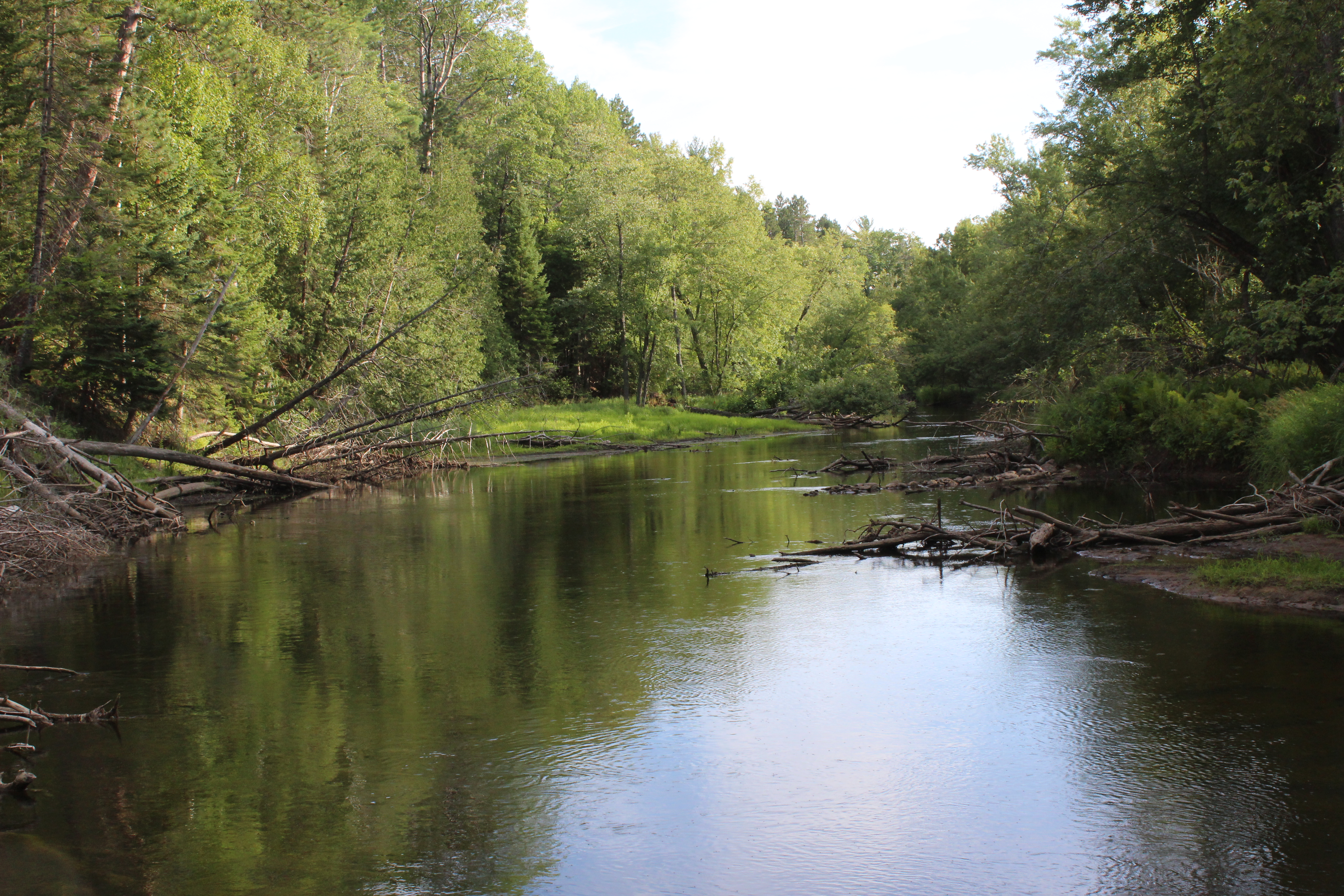

Location
- Country: United States

Physical characteristics
- Source
  - location: Charlton Township, Otsego County, Michigan
- Mouth
  - location: Cheboygan River in Benton Township, Cheboygan County, Michigan
  - elevation: 594 feet (181 m)
- Length: 79 mi (127 km)

Black River is a 78.8-mile-long (126.8 km) river in the U.S. state of Michigan, flowing mostly northward through four Northern Michigan counties: Otsego, Montmorency, Presque Isle, and Cheboygan. The Black River flows into the Cheboygan River at 45°36′13″N 84°27′47″W, just south of the city of Cheboygan, and then into Lake Huron. The main branch of the Black River originates in Charlton Township in east-central Otsego County near the boundary with Montmorency County. The East Branch of the Black River rises less than a mile to the east in Vienna Township in Montmorency County. The other major tributaries, Canada Creek, Tomahawk Creek and the Rainy River all rise in northern Montmorency County.

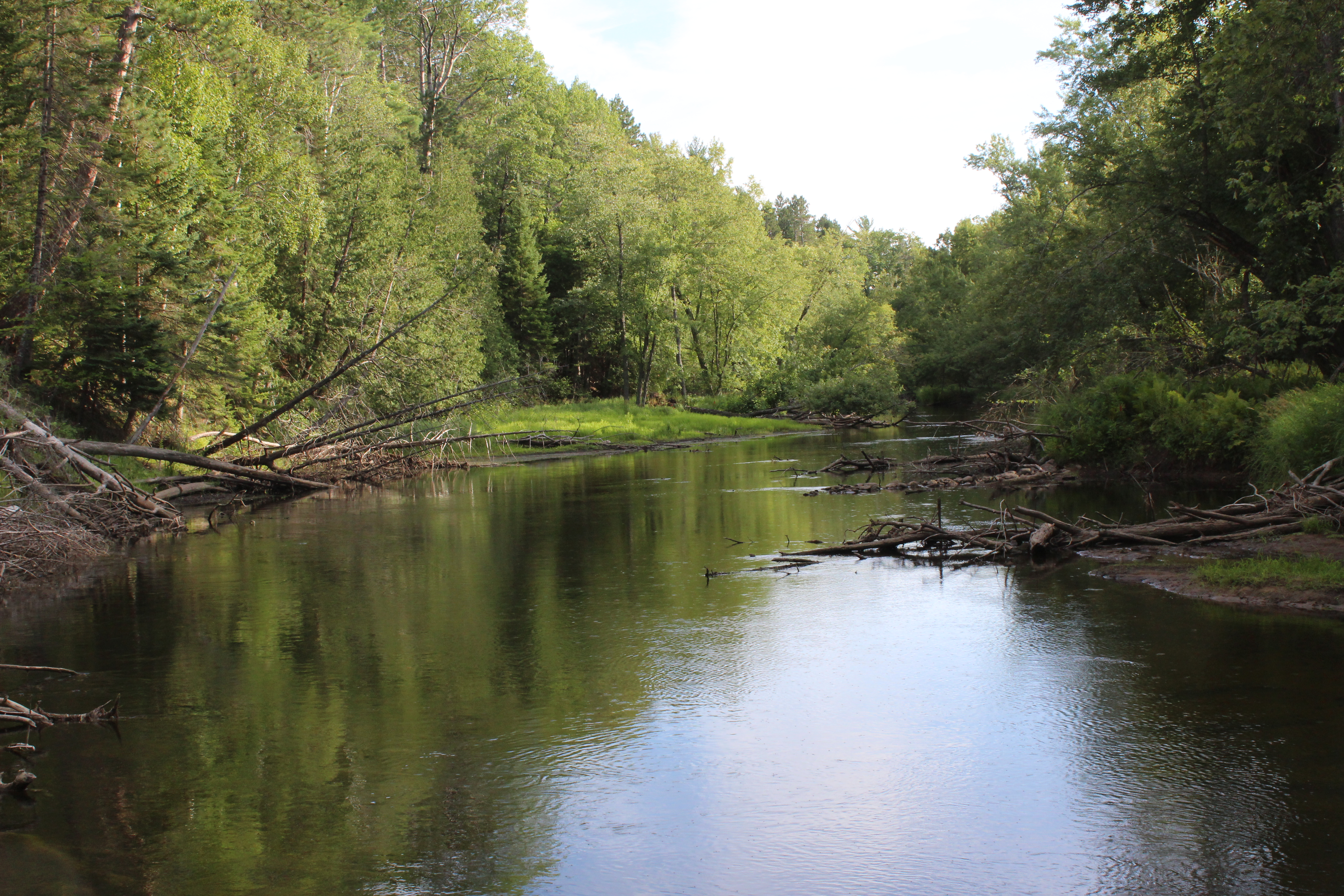
Black River in Cheboygan County, south of Black Lake.

Tributaries (from the mouth):

- (left) Beechnut Creek
- (left) Myers Creek
- (right) Wixon Creek
  - (left) Spring Creek
- (left) Section Seven Creek
- (left) Owens Creek
  - (right) Twin Lakes Outlet
    - Twin Lakes
- (right) Long Lake Creek
  - Long Lake
- Black Lake
  - Cains Creek
  - Doriva Beach Creek
  - Rainy River
    - (left) Cold Creek
    - (right) Little Rainy River
    - (left) East Branch Rainy River
    - Rainy Lake
      - West Branch Upper Rainy River
        - Rainy River Flooding formed by the Rainy River dam
          - Lower Tomahawk Lake
            - Upper Tomahawk Lake
  - Stony Creek (also known as Strong Creek)
  - Stewart Creek
  - Fisher Creek
  - Upper Black River (portion above Black Lake)
    - (right) Milligan Creek
      - (right) Stony Creek
        - Stony Creek Flooding
          - Adair Creek
      - (right) Gokee Creek
      - (right) Weed Creek
      - (right) Lewis Branch Adair Creek
      - Dorsey Lake (also known as Duby Lake)
    - (right) Welch Creek
    - (right) Gillis Creek
    - (left) Bowen Creek
    - (right) Sturgis Creek
      - (right) Lyons Creek
    - (right) Gregg Creek
    - (left) Tomahawk Creek
      - Francis Lake
      - Little Tomahawk Lake
      - Tomahawk Creek Flooding (on the boundary between Presque Isle and Montmorency counties)
        - Twin Tomahawk Lakes
    - (left) Canada Creek
      - (right) Oxbow Creek
        - (left) Bear Den Lake
      - (left) Horsehead Lake
        - Wildfowl Lake (also known as Upper Horsehead Lake)
      - (right) Little Joe Lake (also known as Horseshoe Lake)
      - (left) Lake Geneva (also known as Scotty Lake)
        - Virginia Lake (also known as Perch Lake)
      - (right) Montague Creek
      - (right) Van Hetton Creek
        - East Town Corner Lake
          - West Town Corner Lake
      - Muskellunge Lake
        - (left) Pug Lakes
        - Valentine Lake
          - Jackson Lake
          - Packer Creek
    - (right) McMasters Creek
      - (left) Little McMasters Creek
      - (left) West McMasters Creek
      - (right) Dog Lake
    - (left) East Branch Black River (rises in the Green Swamp of northwest Montmorency County)
      - Foch Lakes
        - Town Line Lakes
      - (left) Rattlesnake Creek
    - (right) Stewart Creek
      - Stewart Lake (also known as Sally Lake)
    - (right) Hardwood Creek
    - (left) Hodge Creek
      - (right) Tubbs Creek
    - (right) Saunders Creek
  - Mud Creek
    - (right) Little Mud Creek
