= Lewiston, Michigan =

- Census-designated place (CDP) & unincorporated community
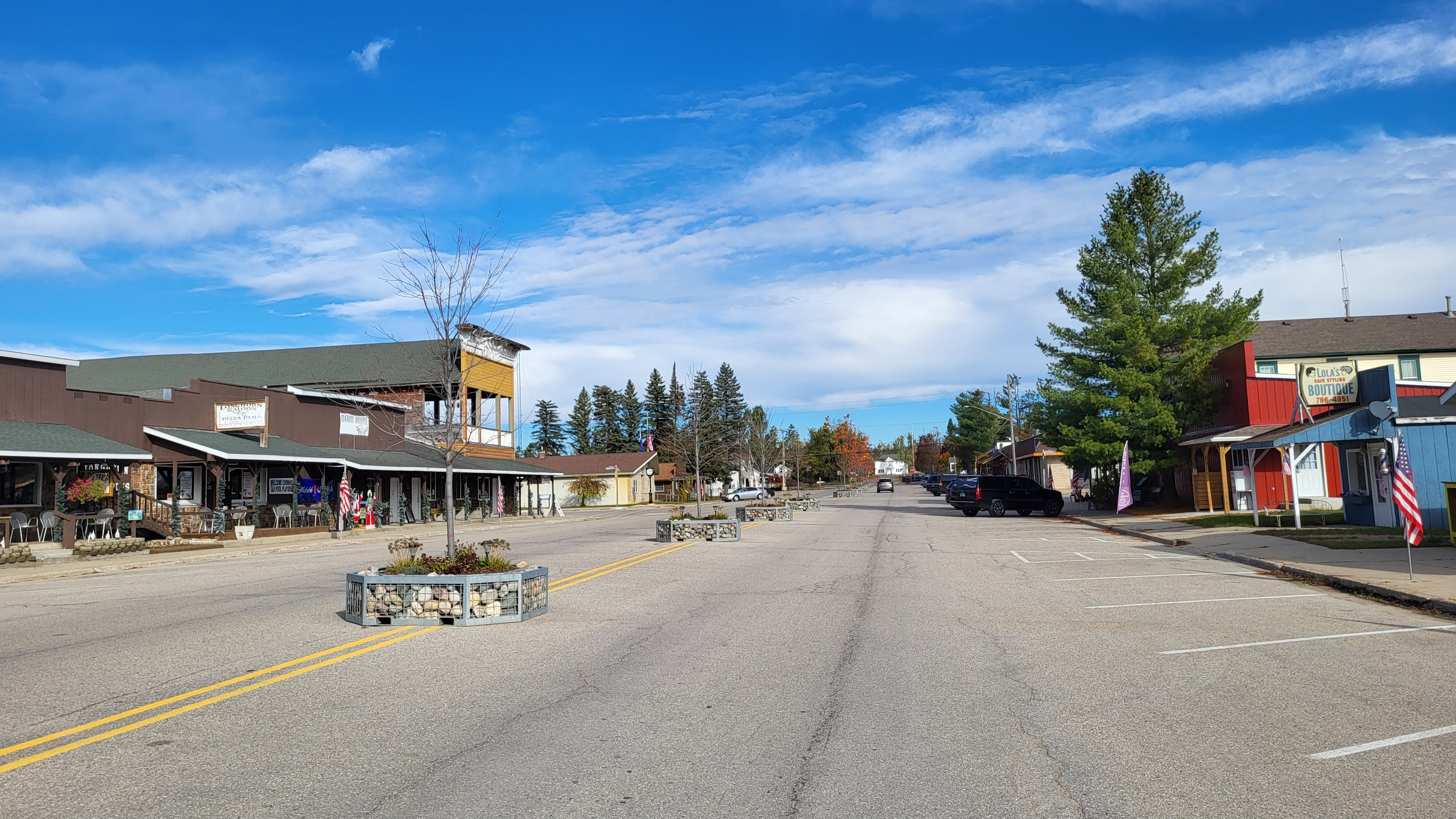
- Looking north along Kneeland Street

- Location within Montmorency County

- Location within the state of Michigan Location within the United States
- Coordinates: 44°53′02″N 84°18′20″W
- Country: United States
- State: Michigan
- County: Montmorency
- Township: Albert
- Established: 1891

Area
  - Total: 4.12 sq mi (10.66 km^{2})
  - Land: 2.83 sq mi (7.34 km^{2})
  - Water: 1.28 sq mi (3.32 km^{2})
- Elevation: 1,243 ft (379 m)

Population (2020)
  - Total: 996
  - Density: 351.94/sq mi (135.88/km^{2})
- Time zone: UTC-5 (Eastern (EST))
  - Summer (DST): UTC-4 (EDT)
- ZIP code(s): 49756
- Area code: 989
- FIPS code: 26-47260
- GNIS feature ID: 0630355

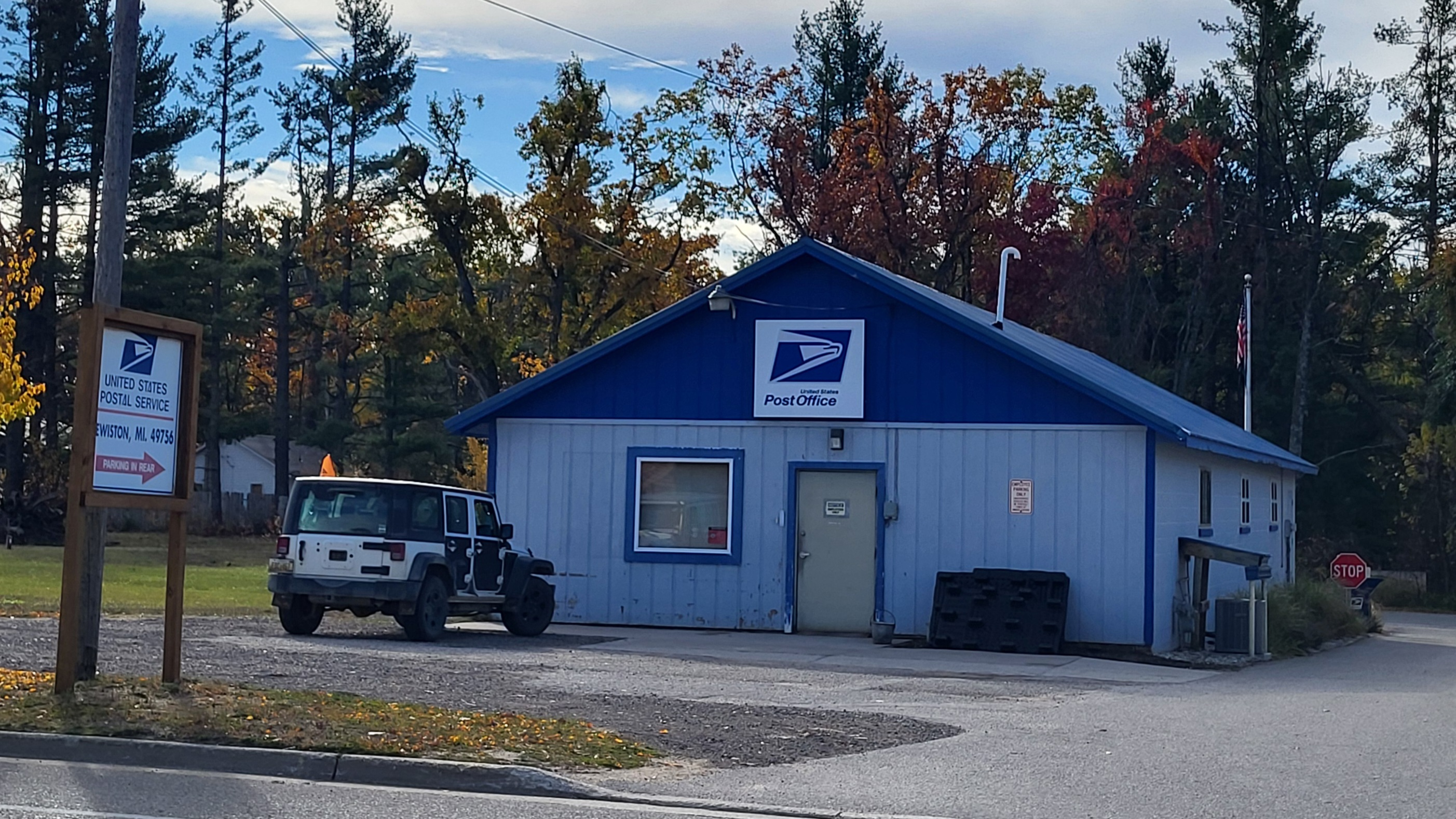
U.S. Post Office in Lewiston

Lewiston is an unincorporated community in Montmorency County, Michigan, United States. It is a census-designated place (CDP) for statistical purposes. The population was 996 at the 2020 census.

== History ==
The Lewiston post office first opened on April 25, 1892. The Lewiston Area Historical Society Museum is in an 1892 original Lewiston home. It was first owned by David Kneeland, who was the manager of the Michelson & Hanson Lumber Company; his family lived in Lewiston from 1892 to 1910. When the mill closed, Kneeland sold the dwelling to George and Martha Sachs, who then expanded some of the town's boundaries, defining what they are today. Lewiston is also known as Timber Town.

== Geography ==
The community is in southwestern Montmorency County, in western Albert Township. It is bordered to the south by Oscoda County. It is 16 miles (26 km) southwest of Atlanta, the Montmorency county seat, and 27 miles (43 km) southeast of Gaylord. The community is centered on the north side of East Twin Lake, but the CDP extends south so as to surround the entire lake.

According to the United States Census Bureau, the CDP has a total area of 4.1 square miles (11 km^{2}), of which 2.8 square miles (7.3 km^{2}) are land and 1.3 square miles (3.4 km^{2}), or 38.16%, are water. East Twin Lake and its downstream neighbor, West Twin Lake, are part of the Au Sable River watershed leading to Lake Huron.

== Demographics ==
Historical population
| Census | Pop. | Note | %± |
|---|---|---|---|
| 2000 | 990 | | — |
| 2010 | 1,392 | | 40.6% |
| 2020 | 996 | | −28.4% |
U.S. Decennial Census

As of the census of 2000, there were 990 people, 480 households, and 312 families residing in the CDP. The population density was 187.2 inhabitants per square mile (72.3/km^{2}). There were 1,230 housing units at an average density of 232.6 per square mile (89.8/km^{2}). The racial makeup of the CDP was 98.59% White, 0.10% African American, 0.20% Native American, 0.61% from other races, and 0.51% from two or more races. Hispanic or Latino of any race were 1.21% of the population.

There were 480 households, out of which 15.4% had children under the age of 18 living with them, 57.5% were married couples living together, 5.2% had a female householder with no husband present, and 35.0% were non-families. 31.3% of all households were made up of individuals, and 20.2% had someone living alone who was 65 years of age or older. The average household size was 2.06 and the average family size was 2.53.

In the CDP, the population was spread out, with 15.3% under the age of 18, 4.6% from 18 to 24, 16.6% from 25 to 44, 30.3% from 45 to 64, and 33.2% who were 65 years of age or older. The median age was 55 years. For every 100 females, there were 91.1 males. For every 100 females age 18 and over, there were 90.7 males.

The median income for a household in the CDP was $31,429, and the median income for a family was $36,563. Males had a median income of $31,250 versus $18,869 for females. The per capita income for the CDP was $20,393. About 4.3% of families and 6.5% of the population were below the poverty line, including 9.8% of those under age 18 and 5.4% of those age 65 or over.

As of the 2010 census, the population for Lewiston, Michigan was 1,392. The population was more female dominated, with there being 718 females compared to 674 males. The total number of households for the 2010 census was 689, with 413 of these households being family households. The average household size was around two. Of this total household number, 318(46.2%) of them include married couples. 22(3.2%) of them include a male householder with no wife present, and 73(10.6%) of them include a female householder with no husband present. The total number of households that have one or more people under the age of 18 years is 131(19.0%); 558(80.9%) households have no people under the age of 18 years. The remaining number of 276(40.1%) households is made up of nonfamily households.

The median income for Lewiston residents was $31,576. Lewiston households made slightly more than those in the surrounding cities of Alpena and Cadillac, but their poverty level was 26.4%.

== Notable people ==
- Lila Neuenfelt (1902–1981), lawyer and judge
