= Montmorency County, Michigan =

County in Michigan, United States

- County
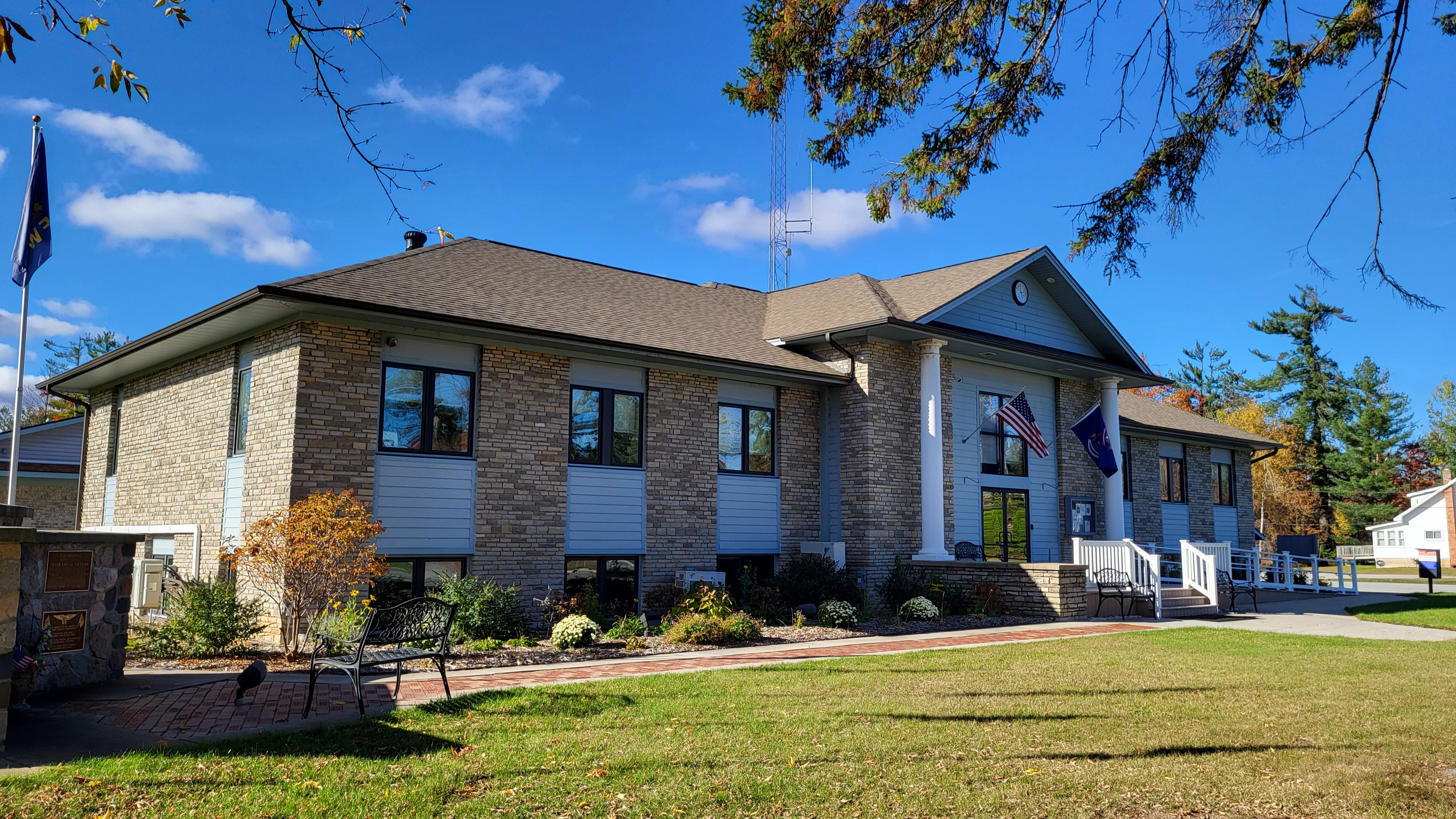
- Montmorency County Courthouse in Atlanta

- Seal

- Location within the U.S. state of Michigan
- Coordinates: 45°02′N 84°08′W
- Country: United States
- State: Michigan
- Created: 1840
- Organized: 1881
- Named for: House of Montmorency
- Seat: Atlanta
- Largest settlement: Lewiston; Hillman (incorporated)

Area
  - Total: 563 sq mi (1,460 km^{2})
  - Land: 547 sq mi (1,420 km^{2})
  - Water: 16 sq mi (41 km^{2}) 2.8%

Population (2020)
  - Total: 9,153
  - Estimate (2025): 9,842 ▲
  - Density: 18/sq mi (6.9/km^{2})
- Time zone: UTC−5 (Eastern)
  - Summer (DST): UTC−4 (EDT)
- Congressional district: 1st
- Website: montcounty.org

Montmorency County (/ˌmɒntməˈrɛnsi/ MONT-mə-REN-see) is a county located in the U.S. state of Michigan. As of the 2020 census, the population was 9,153, making it the second-least populous county in Michigan's Lower Peninsula, behind its southern neighbor, Oscoda County. The county seat is Atlanta.

Montmorency County is part of Northern Michigan, and is part of the Lake Huron watershed. The Thunder Bay River, which drains much of the county, flows to Lake Huron's Thunder Bay at Alpena.

== History ==
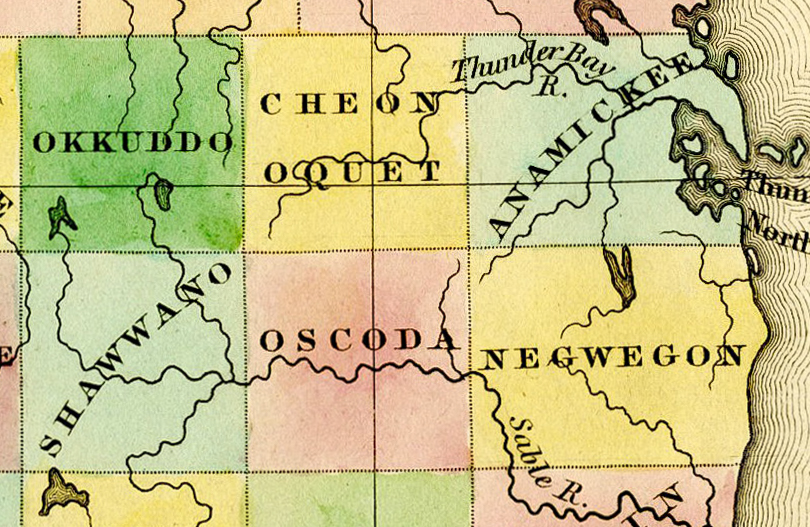
1842 map, showing Montmorency County as Cheonoquet, the county's name from 1840 to 1843.

The county was created by the Michigan Legislature in 1840 as Cheonoquet County, after a well-known Chippewa (also known as Ojibwa) Chief, whose name (Gichi-aanakwad) meant Big Cloud. Cheonoquet took part in Indian treaties in 1807, 1815, 1825 and 1837. Renamed Montmorency County on March 8, 1843, it was originally spelled Montmorenci, and historians conjecture this reflects the area's French-Canadian influence: the French Duke of Montmorency purchased a lieutenant governorship in Canada and the first archbishop of Canada—Montmorency-Laval—both could be influences on the county's name. (There was no "Count Morenci" aiding the American Revolution). The county was organized in 1881. The reason for the change in spelling is subject to some dispute. See List of Michigan county name etymologies. The name Montmorency probably means Mountain Moor. Montmorency is a boggy land or moor that is at the top of a broad mount or highland. When the county was organized in 1881, some land area was taken from Cheboygan and Alpena counties. Three townships were divided: Briley, Montmorency and Rust. By 1901 Albert, Hillman Township and Wheatfield were added. Brush Creek, now known as Hillman, was the first county seat. In 1891 the county seat was moved to Atlanta.

== Geography ==
According to the U.S. Census Bureau, the county has a total area of 563 square miles (1,460 km^{2}), of which 547 square miles (1,420 km^{2}) is land and 16 square miles (41 km^{2}) (2.8%) is water. Although it lies on Michigan's Lower Peninsula, Montmorency County is considered to be part of Northern Michigan.

Most of the county is covered by state forest land. There is an abundance of lakes, such as Long Lake. Glaciers shaped the area, creating a unique regional ecosystem. A large portion of the area is the Grayling outwash plain, a broad outwash plain including sandy ice-disintegration ridges, jack pine barrens, some white pine-red pine forest, and northern hardwood forest. Large lakes were created by glacial action.

=== Adjacent counties ===
- Presque Isle County - northeast
- Alpena County - east
- Alcona County - southeast
- Oscoda County - south
- Crawford County - southwest
- Otsego County - west
- Cheboygan County - northwest

=== Major highways ===
- M-32
- M-33
- Bus. M-32
- F-01
- F-21

== Communities ==
U.S. Census data map showing local municipal boundaries within Montmorency County, as well as CDP boundaries

=== Village ===
- Hillman (partial)

=== Civil townships ===
- Albert Township
- Avery Township
- Briley Township
- Hillman Township
- Loud Township
- Montmorency Township
- Rust Township
- Vienna Township

=== Census-designated places ===
- Atlanta (county seat)
- Canada Creek Ranch
- Lewiston

=== Other unincorporated communities ===
- Big Rock
- Hetherton
- Vienna Corners

== Demographics ==
Historical population
Census	Pop.	Note	%±
1890	1,487		—
1900	3,234		117.5%
1910	3,755		16.1%
1920	4,089		8.9%
1930	2,814		−31.2%
1940	3,840		36.5%
1950	4,125		7.4%
1960	4,424		7.2%
1970	5,247		18.6%
1980	7,492		42.8%
1990	8,936		19.3%
2000	10,315		15.4%
2010	9,765		−5.3%
2020	9,153		−6.3%
2025 (est.)	9,842	▲	7.5%
US Decennial Census; 1790-1960 1900-1990; 1990-2000 2010-2018

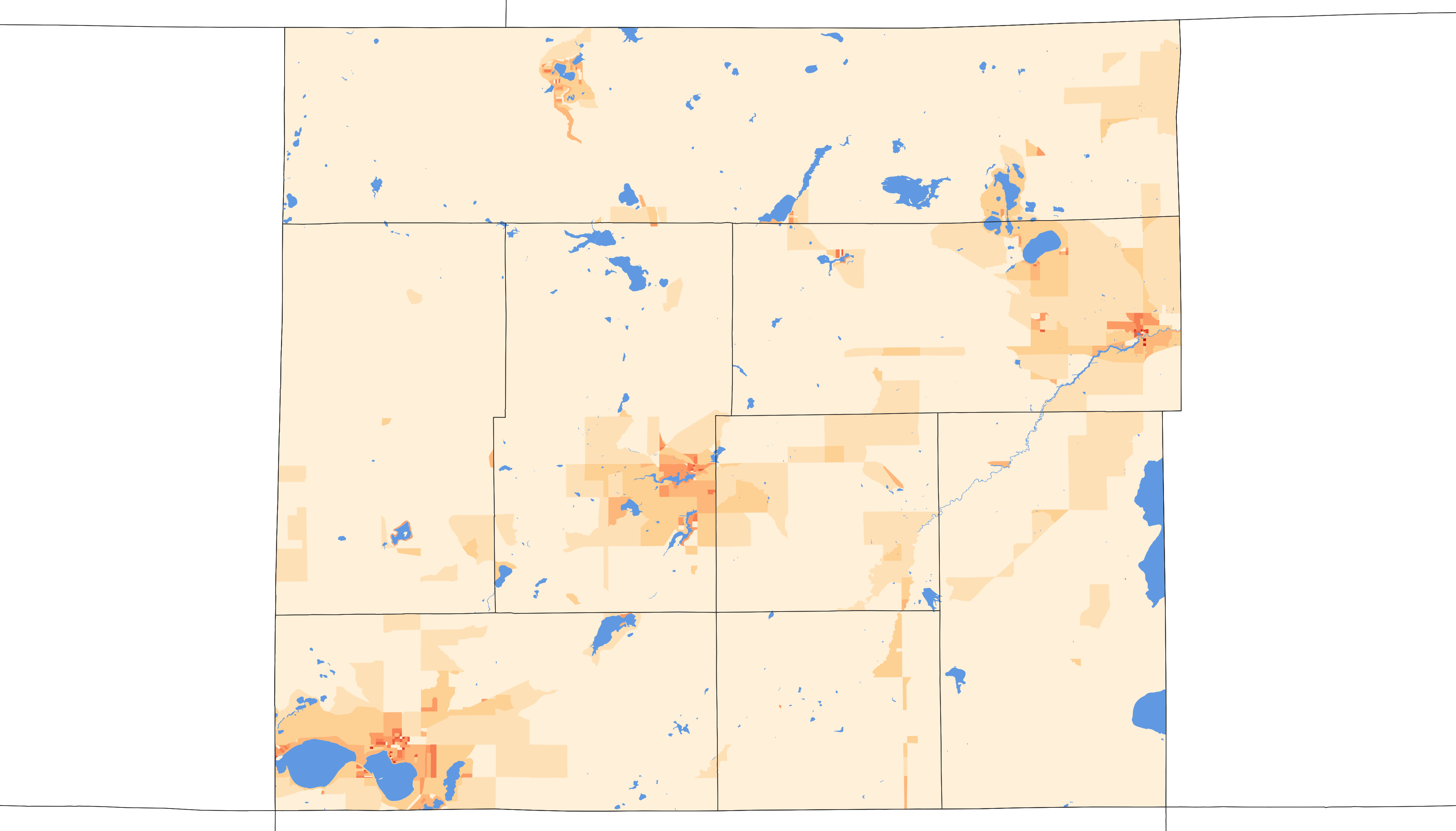
2020 population density of Montmorency County MI by census block

=== Racial and ethnic composition ===
Montmorency County, Michigan – Racial and ethnic composition Note: the US Census treats Hispanic/Latino as an ethnic category. This table excludes Latinos from the racial categories and assigns them to a separate category. Hispanics/Latinos may be of any race.
Race / Ethnicity (NH = Non-Hispanic)	Pop 1980	Pop 1990	Pop 2000	Pop 2010	Pop 2020	% 1980	% 1990	% 2000	% 2010	% 2020
White alone (NH)	7,414	8,815	10,094	9,465	8,551	98.96%	98.65%	97.86%	96.93%	93.42%
Black or African American alone (NH)	1	1	25	15	12	0.01%	0.01%	0.24%	0.15%	0.13%
Native American or Alaska Native alone (NH)	19	47	35	41	68	0.25%	0.53%	0.34%	0.42%	0.74%
Asian alone (NH)	8	10	9	14	24	0.11%	0.11%	0.09%	0.14%	0.26%
Native Hawaiian or Pacific Islander alone (NH)	x	x	0	1	0	x	x	0.00%	0.01%	0.00%
Other race alone (NH)	6	3	0	0	34	0.08%	0.03%	0.00%	0.00%	0.37%
Mixed race or Multiracial (NH)	x	x	85	133	339	x	x	0.82%	1.36%	3.70%
Hispanic or Latino (any race)	44	60	67	96	125	0.59%	0.67%	0.65%	0.98%	1.37%
Total	7,492	8,936	10,315	9,765	9,153	100.00%	100.00%	100.00%	100.00%	100.00%

=== 2020 census ===
As of the 2020 census, the county had a population of 9,153. The median age was 56.6 years. 15.2% of residents were under the age of 18 and 33.1% of residents were 65 years of age or older. For every 100 females there were 106.6 males, and for every 100 females age 18 and over there were 105.3 males age 18 and over.

The racial makeup of the county was 94.2% White, 0.2% Black or African American, 0.7% American Indian and Alaska Native, 0.3% Asian, <0.1% Native Hawaiian and Pacific Islander, 0.5% from some other race, and 4.1% from two or more races. Hispanic or Latino residents of any race comprised 1.4% of the population.

<0.1% of residents lived in urban areas, while 100.0% lived in rural areas.

There were 4,325 households in the county, of which 18.1% had children under the age of 18 living in them. Of all households, 47.7% were married-couple households, 23.5% were households with a male householder and no spouse or partner present, and 21.5% were households with a female householder and no spouse or partner present. About 33.6% of all households were made up of individuals and 18.2% had someone living alone who was 65 years of age or older.

There were 8,930 housing units, of which 51.6% were vacant. Among occupied housing units, 86.1% were owner-occupied and 13.9% were renter-occupied. The homeowner vacancy rate was 3.2% and the rental vacancy rate was 13.8%.

=== 2000 census ===
As of the 2000 United States census, there were 10,315 people, 4,455 households, and 3,047 families residing in the county.

== Economy ==
Dairy products and dry beans are an important part of the county's agricultural production. Service industry and retail trade relating to tourism make up most of the economic base in this rural area. Boating, fishing, and other outdoor activities are offered in abundance.

== Government ==
Voters in Montmorency County favored Democratic Party nominees at the start, but since 1896 have usually voted for the Republican Party. Republican Party nominees have garnered the Montmorency County vote 76% of the time (26 of 34 elections).

United States presidential election results for Montmorency County, Michigan
Year	Republican		Democratic		Third party(ies)	
Year	No.	%	No.	%	No.	%
1884	93	38.91%	137	57.32%	9	3.77%
1888	235	48.86%	237	49.27%	9	1.87%
1892	246	47.67%	255	49.42%	15	2.91%
1896	481	58.73%	330	40.29%	8	0.98%
1900	543	69.17%	233	29.68%	9	1.15%
1904	654	80.54%	146	17.98%	12	1.48%
1908	580	75.23%	179	23.22%	12	1.56%
1912	325	43.62%	163	21.88%	257	34.50%
1916	396	54.25%	272	37.26%	62	8.49%
1920	832	75.57%	199	18.07%	70	6.36%
1924	748	63.93%	140	11.97%	282	24.10%
1928	787	73.97%	270	25.38%	7	0.66%
1932	595	38.04%	903	57.74%	66	4.22%
1936	792	44.05%	958	53.28%	48	2.67%
1940	1,189	60.48%	768	39.06%	9	0.46%
1944	1,034	65.20%	541	34.11%	11	0.69%
1948	1,054	64.11%	553	33.64%	37	2.25%
1952	1,449	71.91%	544	27.00%	22	1.09%
1956	1,385	69.39%	608	30.46%	3	0.15%
1960	1,565	64.32%	866	35.59%	2	0.08%
1964	863	38.60%	1,369	61.23%	4	0.18%
1968	1,279	54.40%	810	34.45%	262	11.14%
1972	1,798	64.49%	914	32.78%	76	2.73%
1976	1,882	52.03%	1,684	46.56%	51	1.41%
1980	2,400	55.71%	1,654	38.39%	254	5.90%
1984	2,913	67.54%	1,387	32.16%	13	0.30%
1988	2,514	61.32%	1,563	38.12%	23	0.56%
1992	1,794	37.45%	1,903	39.72%	1,094	22.83%
1996	1,760	38.33%	2,120	46.17%	712	15.51%
2000	2,750	54.90%	2,139	42.70%	120	2.40%
2004	3,300	59.32%	2,196	39.48%	67	1.20%
2008	2,841	53.00%	2,403	44.83%	116	2.16%
2012	2,928	57.97%	2,049	40.57%	74	1.47%
2016	3,498	69.52%	1,287	25.58%	247	4.91%
2020	4,171	71.14%	1,628	27.77%	64	1.09%
2024	4,599	71.96%	1,702	26.63%	90	1.41%

United States Senate election results for Montmorency County, Michigan1
Year	Republican		Democratic		Third party(ies)	
Year	No.	%	No.	%	No.	%
2024	4,455	71.04%	1,654	26.38%	162	2.58%

Michigan Gubernatorial election results for Montmorency County
Year	Republican		Democratic		Third party(ies)	
Year	No.	%	No.	%	No.	%
2022	3,301	64.49%	1,701	33.23%	117	2.29%

0pThe county government operates the jail, maintains rural roads, operates the major local courts, records deeds, mortgages, and vital records, administers public health regulations, and participates with the state in the provision of social services. The county board of commissioners controls the budget and has limited authority to make laws or ordinances. In Michigan, most local government functions – police and fire, building and zoning, tax assessment, street maintenance etc. – are the responsibility of individual cities and townships.

=== Elected officials ===
- Prosecuting Attorney: Vicki Klindinger
- Sheriff: Chad Brown
- County Clerk: Cheryl A. Neilsen
- County Treasurer: Jean Klein
- Register of Deeds: Teresa Walker
- Drain Commissioner: Jim Zavislak
- Road Commissioners: Joseph R. LaFleche; Theodore Orm; Linda Hicks

(information as of August 2018)

== Recreation ==
- Atlanta is the "Elk Capital of Michigan". Every year during opening day of Elk hunting season the largest bagged are displayed at the "buck pole" on the town's central square. During the off season, driving around in the wilderness surrounding Atlanta looking for these graceful creatures becomes a pastime of locals, cottagers, and tourists.
- Rainbow trout, brook trout, steelhead, perch, bass and other pan fish abound. The county is a hotbed of fly fishing and angling on the edge of some world-class streams and rivers.
- White tail deer hunting is a popular local activity and the firearms deer season opening (November 15) being noted as a holiday to some residents, with schools being closed on opening day. Most of the land in Montmorency County is controlled by state or federal government, making the county a popular hunting area.
- Snow shoeing, cross-country skiing and snow mobile riding are popular outdoor activities. The Sno*Drift rallying race is held on snowy surfaces in February.
- Morel mushroom hunting is a local pastime and attracts many tourists.
- There are many recurring events throughout the area, such as the annual sled dog races held near the end of January on Clear Lake State Park.

ORV/ATV and snowmobile trails are some of the state's best. Many areas are designated as "trail mazes" on some maps. Montmorency County is one of the few counties that allow ATVs on public county roads, thus creating access for fuel, food and various hotels to Hillman, Atlanta, and Lewiston. The main trail system incorporates a scenic Elk tour and various levels of ATV trails.

== Media ==
The newspaper of record for Montmorency County is the Montmorency County Tribune.

== Endangered species ==
Montmorency County is home to Michigan's most endangered species and one of the most endangered species in the world: the Hungerford's crawling water beetle. The species lives in only five locations in the world, two of which are in Montmorency County, both inside the Mackinaw State Forest. The first site is along the East Branch of the Black River where two adult beetles were found in surveys in 1989 and two more again in 1996. In July 1999, six additional adult beetles were identified in the county living in Van Hetton Creek. This latter find was significant as it represented a new location beyond those originally identified when the Hungerford's crawling water beetle was categorized as endangered on March 7, 1994, under the provisions of the US Endangered Species Act. The Van Hetton Creek sighting therefore provides the possibility that more of these very rare beetles might be found elsewhere in Montmorency County.

== See also ==
- List of Michigan State Historic Sites in Montmorency County, Michigan
