= M-32 (Michigan highway) =

State highway in Michigan, United States

M-32
- M-32 highlighted in red; Bus. M-32 highlighted in green

Route information
- Maintained by MDOT
- Length: 100.003 mi (160.939 km)
- Existed: c. July 1, 1919–present

Major junctions
- West end: M-66 at East Jordan
- US 131 near Elmira; I-75 at Gaylord; M-33 at Atlanta; M-65 near Lachine
- East end: US 23 at Alpena

Location
- Country: United States
- State: Michigan
- Counties: Charlevoix, Antrim, Otsego, Montmorency, Alpena

Highway system
- Michigan State Trunkline Highway System; Interstate; US; State; Byways
← M-31	→ US 33

M-32 is a state trunkline highway in the Lower Peninsula of the U.S. state of Michigan. It is an east–west highway running just over 100 miles (160.9 km) from M-66 in East Jordan to US Highway 23 (US 23) in Alpena. It runs via Gaylord and Atlanta through forested terrain. There is one business spur for the highway that currently exists.

The highway has been extended a few times during its history, once reaching both lakes Michigan and Huron. Although it is no longer a true "cross-peninsular" highway, it is close, and there are efforts being made to extend the road back to US 31, restoring the cross-peninsular status lost in 1974 when it was shortened away from Charlevoix.

== Route description ==
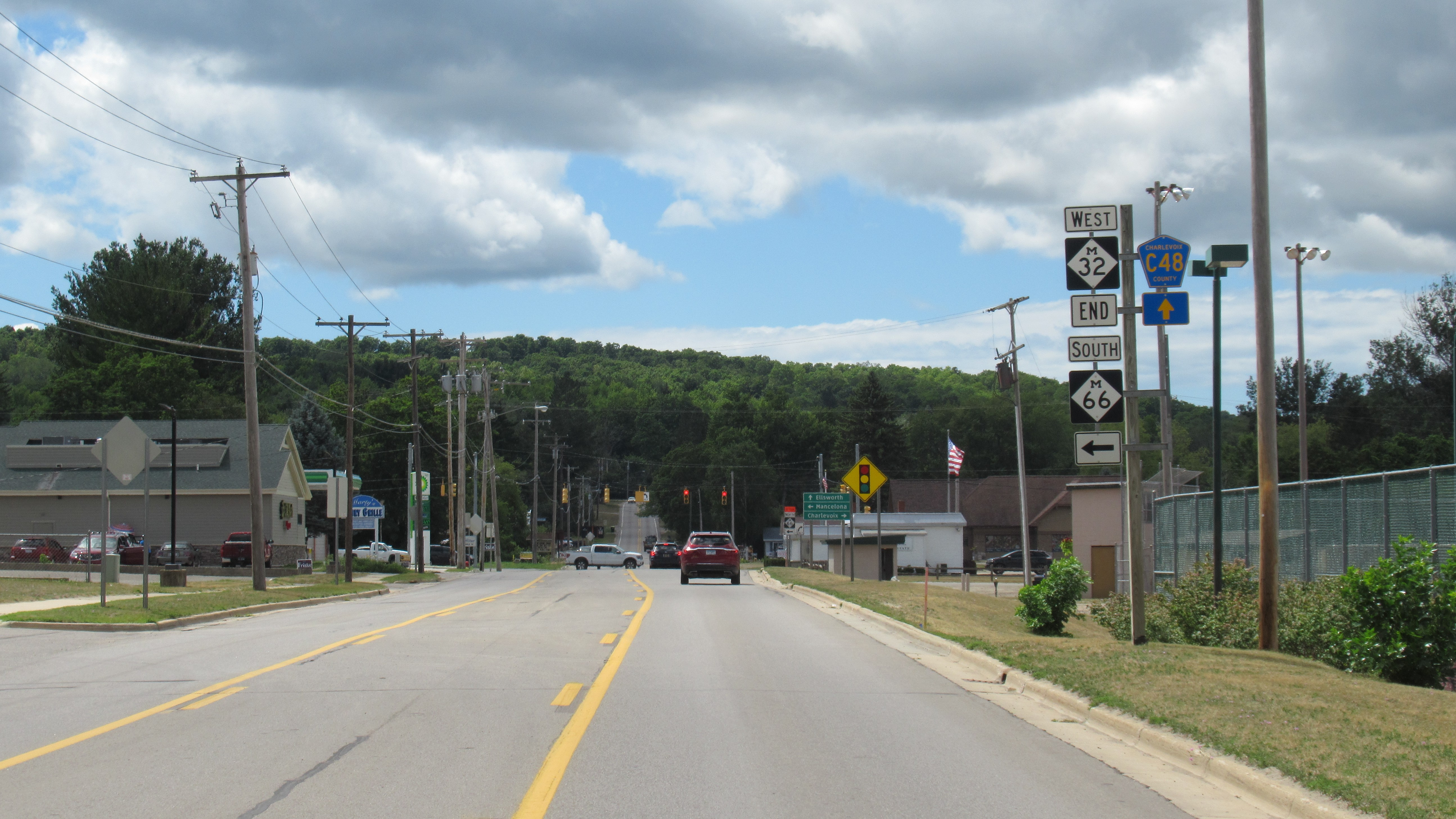
Western terminus of M-32 at M-66 (Lake Street) in East Jordan

M-32 starts an intersection with M-66 at the corner of Lake and Water streets in East Jordan. From there it follows Water, Bridge, Mill and State streets through town. It finally turns south on Maple Street leaving town. The trunkline turns east on Rogers Road south of Patricia Lake and then runs southeast into Antrim County. There it joins US 131 along a concurrency before turning east through Elmira and running east toward Gaylord. North of the Alba Road intersection, M-32 passes a cluster of lakes that includes Lake 27. Continuing east, M-32 crosses through a retail corridor before it passes under Interstate 75 (I-75) and runs into downtown Gaylord with Business Loop I-75 (BL I-75). Passing out of Gaylord, the highway runs southeasterly toward Johannesburg. The road passes Big Lake and turns south on Turtle Lake Road at the intersection with Beckett Road. The highway resumes its eastward path on McCoy Road into Johannesburg. It passes through the community and meets the county line in Vienna. There M-32 turns northwesterly to Atlanta. In town, M-32 meets and joins M-33. The two highways cross the Thunder Bay River before parting ways east of Atlanta in Avery Township. M-32 turns north by Fletcher Pond, which straddles the Montmorency–Alpena county line. Outside of the village of Hillman, M-32 passes Business M-32 (Bus. M-32). In western Alpena County, the trunkline runs to the north of Manning Hill and passes the south end of the Alpena County Regional Airport outside Alpena. In the city, M-32 follows Washington Avenue, then briefly turns onto a one-way pair with eastbound along Second Avenue and westbound along Third Avenue. The end of the highway is at US 23, blocks from the Thunder Bay of Lake Huron.

All of M-32 consists of rural two-lane highway outside of the city of Gaylord. The highway passes through forest lands outside of the communities along the highway. From US 131 east to the eastern terminus at US 23, M-32 is listed on the National Highway System (NHS), a group of highways which are determined to be important to the nation's economy, defense, and mobility. The exception is a portion in eastern Otsego and western Montmorency counties, between the corner of Beckett & Turtle Lake Roads, six miles (10 km) east of Gaylord to the crossroads known as Big Rock, five miles (8 km) west of Atlanta.

== History ==
M-32 was formed as a state trunkline in 1919 along its present routing between M-13 (now US 131) and M-10 (later US 23, now M-65) near Lachine. In 1933, M-32 was extended westerly along M-131 and then to M-66 in East Jordan. The concurrency along M-131 would remain when US 131 replaced it in 1939. Another change in that year came on the eastern end when US 23 was realigned north of Alpena. M-32 took over the US 23 routing between Lachine and Alpena. M-32 was extended along M-66 to Charlevoix from 1964 until 1974. Bus. M-32 was disconnected from M-32 when the latter was realigned in Hillman in 1994.

In August 2021, a one-mile (1.6 km) stretch of the highway west of Alpena was closed off for use by the Michigan Air National Guard (MANG) as a runway, for an exercise involving four A-10 Warthogs, two C-146A Wolfhounds, as part of Exercise Northern Strike 21. The A-10s were able to land, and then simulate refitting, rearming, refueling and return to the simulated battle. This is the first time training like this has occurred in North America. The MANG is normally based at Alpena County Regional Airport.

== Future ==
A portion of M-32 is not on the NHS. Instead, the Federal Highway Administration map for the NHS in Michigan shows a proposed realignment that has not been built as of 2008.

Municipal officials in the Village of Ellsworth have sought an extension of M-32 westward from East Jordan to end at US 31. Such an extension would restore M-32's status as a "cross-peninsular" highway, making it the 4th if extended.

== Major intersections ==
County	Location	mi	km	Destinations	Notes
Charlevoix	East Jordan	0.000	0.000	M-66 – Charlevoix, Mancelona C-48 west – Ellsworth	Western end of C-48 concurrency
Charlevoix	East Jordan	1.113	1.791	C-48 east	Eastern end of C-48 concurrency
Antrim	Jordan–Warner township line	10.879	17.508	C-73 north	Southern terminus of C-73
Antrim	Warner Township	15.526	24.987	US 131 north – Petoskey	Northern end of US 131 concurrency
Antrim	Warner Township	16.086	25.888	US 131 south – Kalkaska, Cadillac	Southern end of US 131 concurrency
Otsego	Elmira–Hayes township line	24.386	39.245	C-42 west – Alba	Eastern terminus of C-42
Otsego	Gaylord	28.618– 28.348	46.056– 45.622	I-75 – Mackinac Bridge, Saginaw BL I-75 south	Western end of BL I-75 concurrency; exit 282 on I-75
Otsego	Gaylord	29.162	46.932	BL I-75 south	Eastern end of BL I-75 concurrency
Otsego	Gaylord	30.335	48.819	F-44 east (Wilkinson Road)	Western terminus of F-44
Otsego	Chester Township	37.529	60.397	F-42 west (McCoy Road)	Eastern terminus of F-42
Otsego	Charlton Township	43.121	69.397	F-97 south (Douglas Lake Road)	Northern terminus of F-97
Otsego–Montmorency county line	Vienna Corners	47.150	75.881	F-01 south (Meridian Line Road)	Northern terminus of F-01
Montmorency	Atlanta	61.666	99.242	M-33 north – Onaway	Western end of M-33 concurrency
Montmorency	Avery Township	67.628	108.837	M-33 south – Mio	Eastern end of M-33 concurrency
Montmorency	Hillman	76.718	123.466	F-21 north – Hillman	Southern terminus of F-21; to Bus. M-32; also the former routing of M-32
Alpena	Green Township	84.343	135.737	M-65 south – Curran	Western end of M-65 concurrency
Alpena	Green Township	85.954	138.330	M-65 north – Rogers City	Eastern end of M-65 concurrency
Alpena	Alpena	100.003	160.939	US 23 / LHCT – Cheboygan, Standish	Roadway continues east as Second and Third avenues
1.000 mi = 1.609 km; 1.000 km = 0.621 mi: Concurrency terminus

== Business spur ==
Business M-32
- Location: Hillman
- Length: 0.738 mi (1,188 m)
- Existed: by 1927–present

Business M-32 (Bus. M-32) is a 0.738-mile (1.188 km) business spur route running through Hillman, Michigan. There are markers present, but Bus. M-32 does not connect to M-32. It is the shortest business route in the state, and the second shortest overall trunkline. It is 0.006 miles (0.010 km) longer than M-212 in Aloha. The termini for Bus. M-32 are Hillman Road and Old M-32 south of Hillman and the northern city limit along Hillman Road.

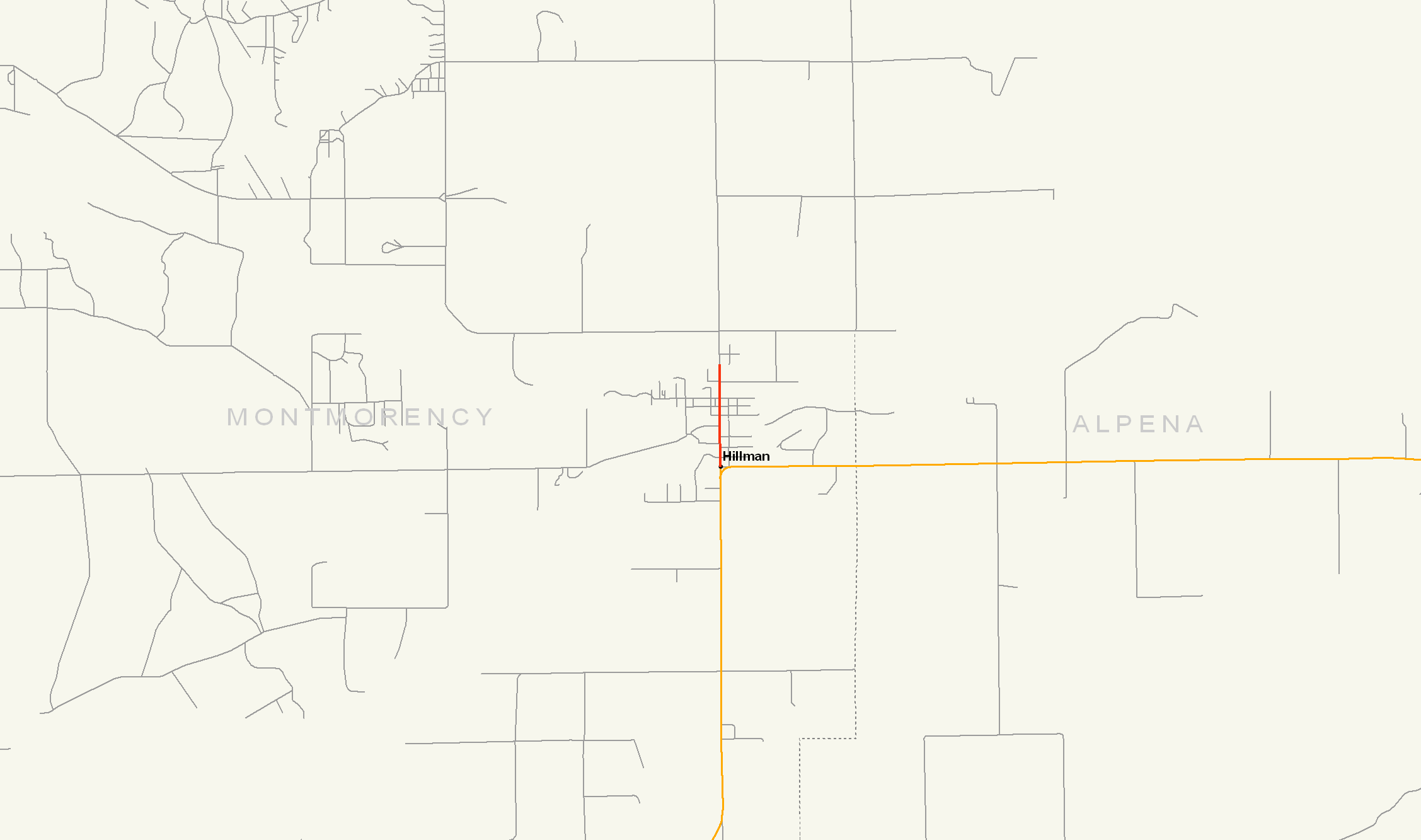
Bus. M-32 highlighted in red
