= Hillman, Michigan =

- Village
- Village of Hillman
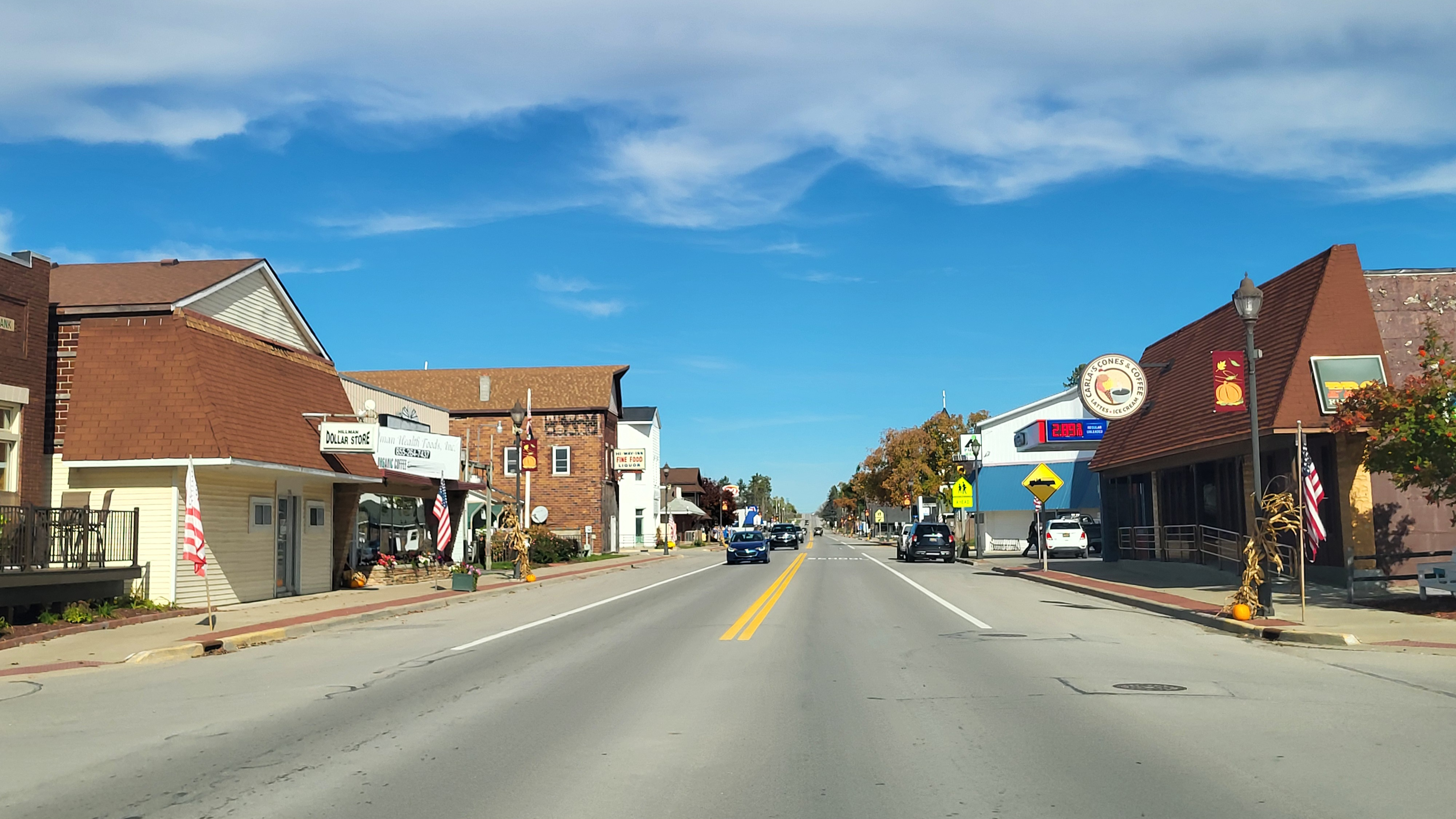
- Looking north along Bus. M-32 / F-21

- Location within Montmorency County

- Location within the state of Michigan Location within the United States
- Coordinates: 45°03′54″N 83°54′02″W
- Country: United States
- State: Michigan
- Counties: Alpena and Montmorency
- Townships: Green and Hillman
- Settled: 1880
- Incorporated: 1891

Government
  - Type: Village council
  - President: Dave Hornbacher
  - Clerk: Ann Williams
  - Manager: David Post

Area
  - Total: 1.71 sq mi (4.42 km^{2})
  - Land: 1.66 sq mi (4.29 km^{2})
  - Water: 0.050 sq mi (0.13 km^{2})
- Elevation: 804 ft (245 m)

Population (2020)
  - Total: 605
  - Density: 364.46/sq mi (140.72/km^{2})
- Time zone: UTC-5 (Eastern (EST))
  - Summer (DST): UTC-4 (EDT)
- ZIP code(s): 49746
- Area code: 989
- FIPS code: 26-38380
- GNIS feature ID: 0628315
- Website: Official website

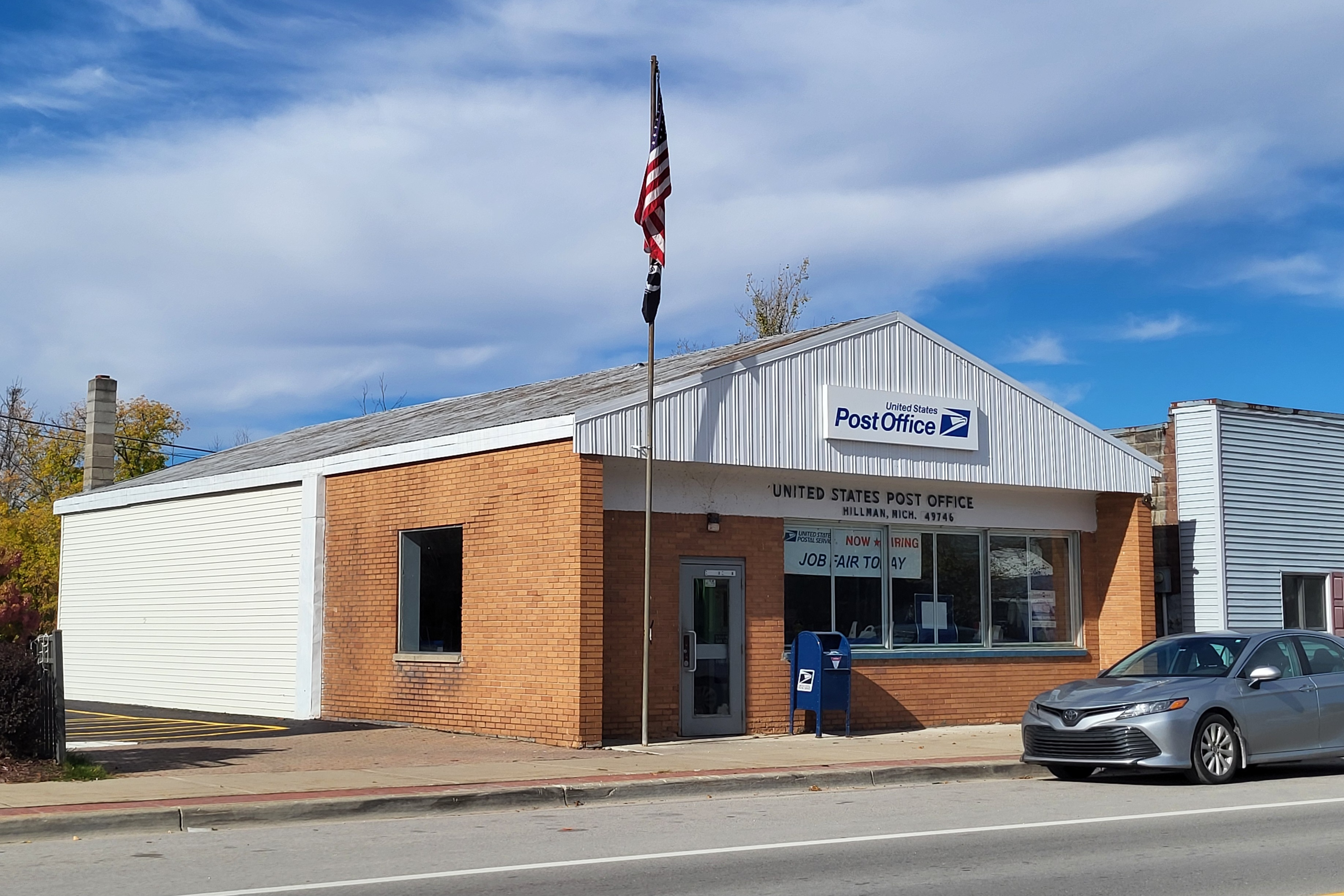
U.S. Post Office in Hillman

Hillman is a village in Alpena and Montmorency counties in the U.S. state of Michigan. The population was 605 as of the 2020 census. Nearly all of the village is located within Hillman Township (Montmorency County), with only a small portion extending into Green Township (Alpena County).

== History ==
Hillman was the county seat of Montmorency County from 1881 until the removal of the county seat to Atlanta in 1891.

== Geography ==
The village is in eastern Montmorency County, with a small portion extending east into Alpena County. It is 15 miles (24 km) east-northeast of Atlanta and 23 miles (37 km) west of Alpena.

According to the U.S. Census Bureau, the village has a total area of 1.70 square miles (4.40 km^{2}), of which 1.66 square miles (4.30 km^{2}) are land and 0.05 square miles (0.13 km^{2}), or 2.82%, are water. The Thunder Bay River passes through the village, flowing east to enter Lake Huron at Alpena. Brush Creek joins the river from the northwest within the village.

== Demographics ==
Historical population
Census	Pop.	Note	%±
1900	253		—
1910	411		62.5%
1920	400		−2.7%
1930	289		−27.7%
1940	363		25.6%
1950	442		21.8%
1960	455		2.9%
1970	366		−19.6%
1980	373		1.9%
1990	643		72.4%
2000	685		6.5%
2010	701		2.3%
2020	605		−13.7%
U.S. Decennial Census

=== 2010 census ===
As of the census of 2010, there were 701 people, 300 households, and 158 families living in the village. The population density was 424.8 inhabitants per square mile (164.0/km^{2}). There were 363 housing units at an average density of 220.0 per square mile (84.9/km^{2}). The racial makeup of the village was 97.9% White, 0.1% African American, 0.7% Native American, 0.1% Asian, 0.1% from other races, and 1.0% from two or more races. Hispanic or Latino of any race were 1.4% of the population.

There were 300 households, of which 20.3% had children under the age of 18 living with them, 35.0% were married couples living together, 14.7% had a female householder with no husband present, 3.0% had a male householder with no wife present, and 47.3% were non-families. 43.3% of all households were made up of individuals, and 24.4% had someone living alone who was 65 years of age or older. The average household size was 2.02 and the average family size was 2.73.

The median age in the village was 51.4 years. 17% of residents were under the age of 18; 5.3% were between the ages of 18 and 24; 17.5% were from 25 to 44; 29.1% were from 45 to 64; and 31.2% were 65 years of age or older. The gender makeup of the village was 46.2% male and 53.8% female.

=== 2000 census ===
As of the census of 2000, there were 685 people, 288 households, and 154 families living in the village. The population density was 406.6 inhabitants per square mile (157.0/km^{2}). There were 329 housing units at an average density of 195.3 per square mile (75.4/km^{2}). The racial makeup of the village was 98.98% White, 0.15% African American, and 0.88% Native American. Hispanic or Latino of any race were 1.46% of the population.

There were 288 households, out of which 24.3% had children under the age of 18 living with them, 35.8% were married couples living together, 14.2% had a female householder with no husband present, and 46.5% were non-families. 42.0% of all households were made up of individuals, and 26.7% had someone living alone who was 65 years of age or older. The average household size was 2.06 and the average family size was 2.75.

In the village, the population was spread out, with 17.8% under the age of 18, 6.6% from 18 to 24, 17.8% from 25 to 44, 23.1% from 45 to 64, and 34.7% who were 65 years of age or older. The median age was 51 years. For every 100 females, there were 74.3 males. For every 100 females age 18 and over, there were 64.1 males.

The median income for a household in the village was $21,250, and the median income for a family was $31,771. Males had a median income of $28,438 versus $23,125 for females. The per capita income for the village was $13,818. About 12.8% of families and 14.7% of the population were below the poverty line, including 16.3% of those under age 18 and 13.4% of those age 65 or over.

== Infrastructure ==
=== Major highways ===
- M-32 bypasses the village to turn east into Alpena County.
- Bus. M-32 runs through Hillman.
- F-21 is a county-designated highway running through the village, ending at M-32 south of Hillman.

=== Trails ===
- Alpena to Hillman Trail
