= Atlanta, Michigan =

- Census-designated place (CDP) & unincorporated community
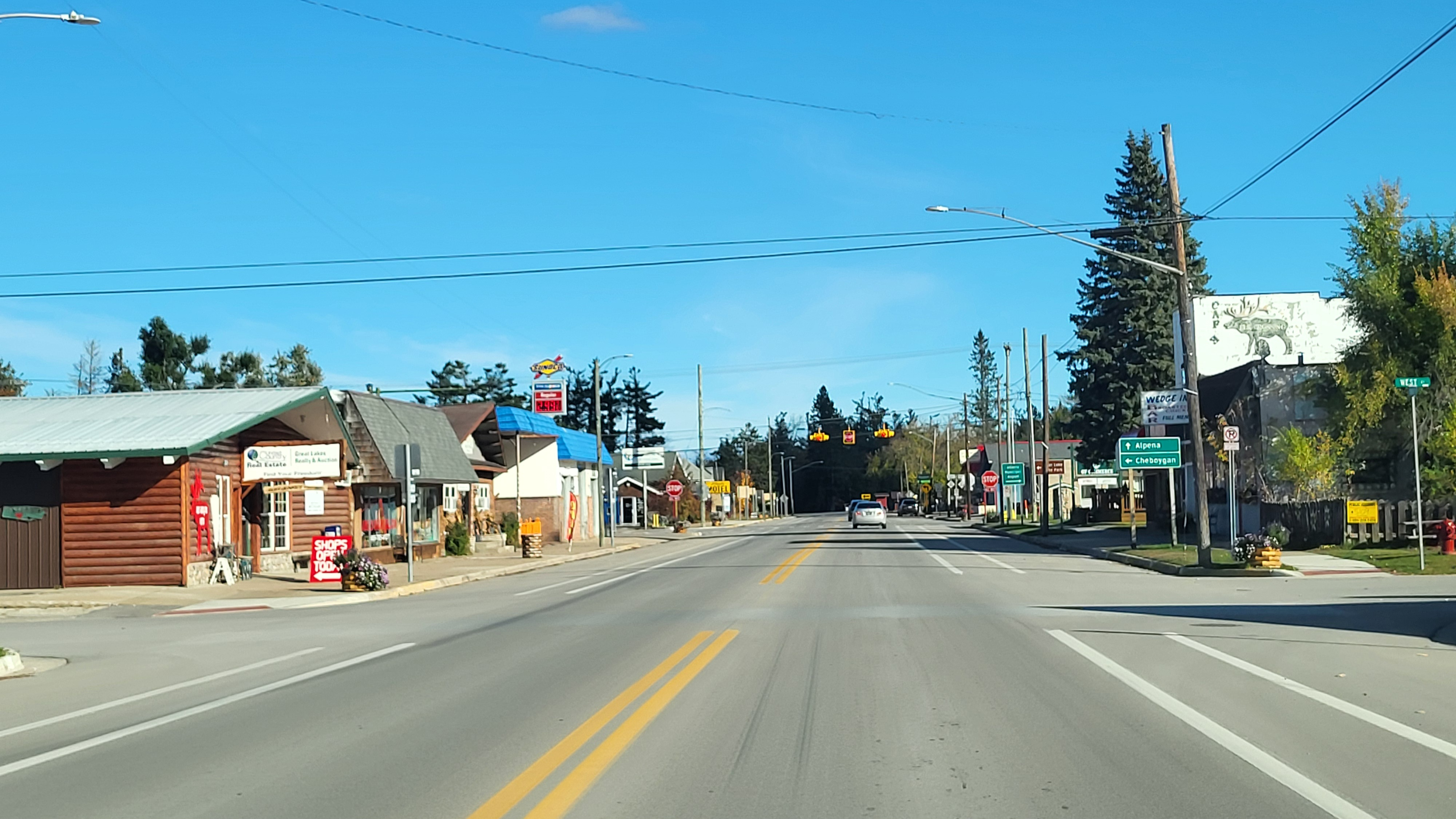
- Looking east along State Street (M-32)
- Nickname: Elk Capital of Michigan
- Location within Montmorency County

- Location within the state of Michigan Location within the United States
- Coordinates: 45°00′17″N 84°08′38″W
- Country: United States
- State: Michigan
- County: Montmorency
- Townships: Avery and Briley
- Established: 1881

Area
  - Total: 3.78 sq mi (9.80 km^{2})
  - Land: 3.61 sq mi (9.35 km^{2})
  - Water: 0.17 sq mi (0.45 km^{2})
- Elevation: 892 ft (272 m)

Population (2020)
  - Total: 720
  - Density: 199.45/sq mi (77.01/km^{2})
- Time zone: UTC-5 (Eastern (EST))
  - Summer (DST): UTC-4 (EDT)
- ZIP code(s): 49709
- Area code: 989
- FIPS code: 26-03920
- GNIS feature ID: 0620305

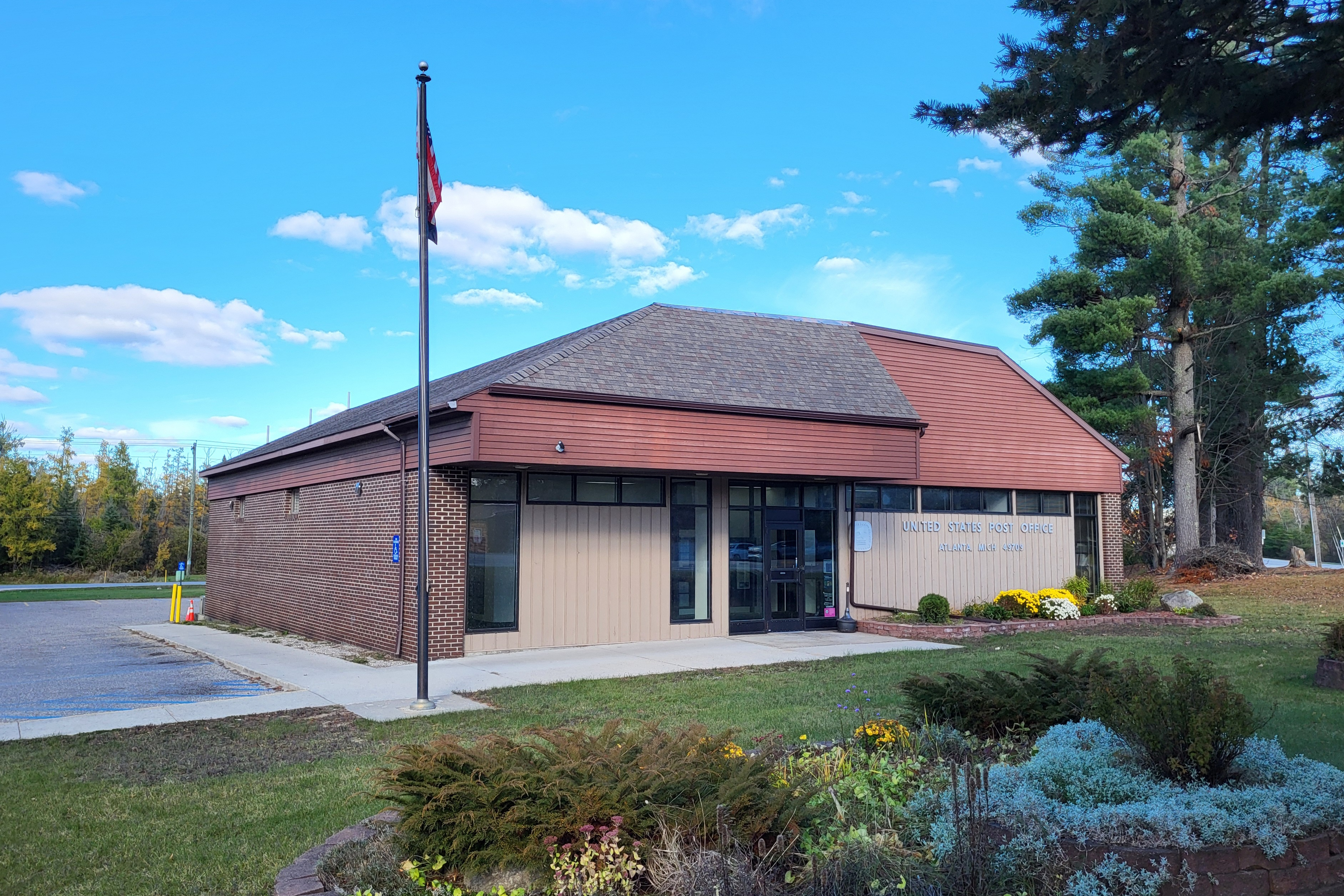
U.S. Post Office in Atlanta

Atlanta is a census-designated place and unincorporated community in the U.S. state of Michigan. It is the county seat of Montmorency County. The community had a population of 720 at the 2020 census, down from 827 in 2010. Atlanta has been nicknamed the "Elk Capital of Michigan".

Atlanta is home to the annual Sno*Drift rally racing event. The event is currently the first Rally America National Rally Championship event of the season.

== History ==
Atlanta was established in 1881 by Alfred J. West. The Atlanta post office opened under the name "Big Rock" on March 24, 1882; the name was changed to Atlanta on October 2, 1882, and was named after Atlanta, Georgia.

== Geography ==
Atlanta is in central Montmorency County, mainly in eastern Briley Township, with a portion extending east into Avery Township. It is 46 miles (74 km) west of Alpena on Lake Huron, 32 miles (51 km) east of Gaylord and Interstate 75, and 26 miles (42 km) south of Onaway.

According to the U.S. Census Bureau, the Atlanta CDP has a total area of 3.8 square miles (9.8 km^{2}), of which 3.6 square miles (9.3 km^{2}) are land and 0.2 square miles (0.5 km^{2}), or 4.53%, are water. The Thunder Bay River flows into the community from the southwest and exits to the southeast, leading toward Thunder Bay on Lake Huron.

=== Major highways ===
- M-32 is an east–west route that runs through the community. The highway can be used to access Gaylord to the west, and Hillman and Alpena to the east.
- M-33 is a north–south route that runs through the community. The highway can be used to access Mio to the south, and Onaway and Cheboygan to the north.

== Climate ==
This climatic region is typified by large seasonal temperature differences, with warm to hot (and often humid) summers and cold (sometimes severely cold) winters. According to the Köppen Climate Classification system, Atlanta has a humid continental climate, abbreviated "Dfb" on climate maps.

== Demographics ==
Historical population
Census	Pop.	Note	%±
2000	757		—
2010	827		9.2%
2020	720		−12.9%
U.S. Decennial Census

As of the census of 2000, there were 757 people, 339 households, and 215 families residing in the CDP. The population density was 278.9 inhabitants per square mile (107.7/km^{2}). There were 501 housing units at an average density of 184.6 per square mile (71.3/km^{2}). The racial makeup of the CDP was 98.41% White, 0.13% African American, 0.40% Native American, 0.40% Asian, and 0.66% from two or more races. Hispanic or Latino of any race were 0.40% of the population.

There were 339 households, out of which 27.1% had children under the age of 18 living with them, 46.3% were married couples living together, 13.6% had a female householder with no husband present, and 36.3% were non-families. 31.9% of all households were made up of individuals, and 15.3% had someone living alone who was 65 years of age or older. The average household size was 2.22 and the average family size was 2.73.

In the CDP, the population was spread out, with 22.1% under the age of 18, 7.8% from 18 to 24, 22.3% from 25 to 44, 27.9% from 45 to 64, and 19.9% who were 65 years of age or older. The median age was 43 years. For every 100 females, there were 89.3 males. For every 100 females age 18 and over, there were 90.9 males.

The median income for a household in the CDP was $23,529, and the median income for a family was $37,188. Males had a median income of $28,250 versus $18,854 for females. The per capita income for the CDP was $15,178. About 19.2% of families and 23.8% of the population were below the poverty line, including 33.8% of those under age 18 and 12.5% of those age 65 or over.

== Education ==
Atlanta is served by the Atlanta Community Schools district.
