= Charlton Township, Michigan =

- Civil township
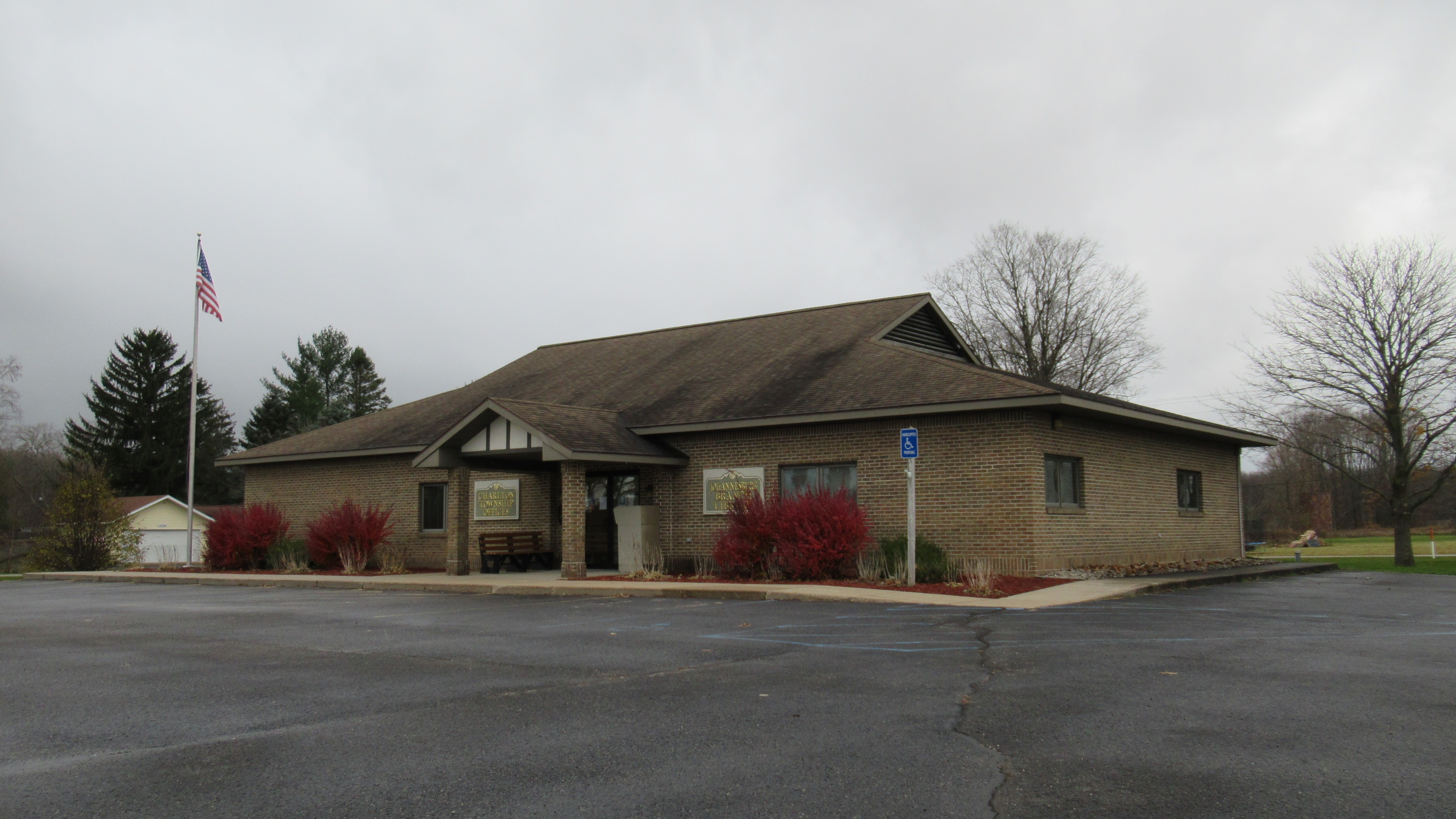
- Charlton Township Offices and Johannesburg Branch Library

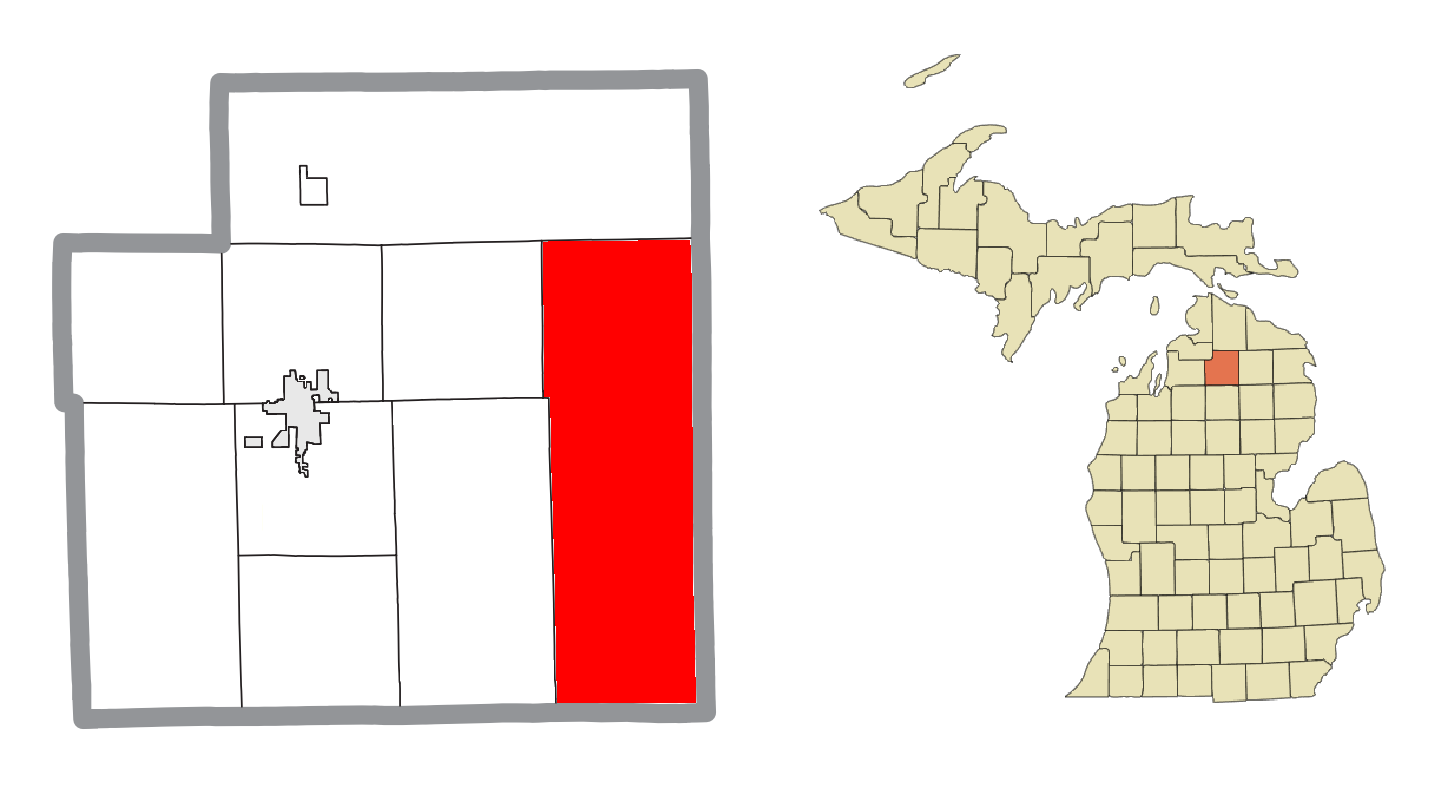
- Location within Otsego County

- Location within the state of Michigan Location within the United States
- Coordinates: 44°57′10″N 84°24′58″W
- Country: United States
- State: Michigan
- County: Otsego
- Established: 1875

Government
  - Supervisor: Matthew Nowak
  - Clerk: George Pewinski

Area
  - Total: 102.20 sq mi (264.70 km^{2})
  - Land: 100.37 sq mi (259.96 km^{2})
  - Water: 1.83 sq mi (4.74 km^{2})
- Elevation: 1,371 ft (418 m)

Population (2020)
  - Total: 1,350
  - Density: 13.5/sq mi (5.2/km^{2})
- Time zone: UTC-5 (Eastern (EST))
  - Summer (DST): UTC-4 (EDT)
- ZIP code(s): 49735 (Gaylord); 49751 (Johannesburg); 49756 (Lewiston)
- Area code: 989
- FIPS code: 26-14840
- GNIS feature ID: 1626063
- Website: Official website

Charlton Township is a civil township of Otsego County in the U.S. state of Michigan. The population was 1,350 at the 2020 census.

== Communities ==
- Hetherton is an unincorporated community located within the township along the county line with Montmorency County at 45°00′45″N 84°22′12″W. The community was settled under the name Briley in 1881 and was located in Montmorency County. When the community settled into Otsego County in 1885, it became known as Heatherton and soon respelled as Hetherton. A post office operated from 1885 to 1923
- Johannesburg is an unincorporated community centered along the M-32 within the township at 44°59′08″N 84°27′21″W. The community began as a station on the Michigan Central Railroad and settled around the Johannesburg Manufacturing Company sawmill. A post office opened on January 7, 1901. The Johannesburg 49751 ZIP Code serves most of Charlton Township and portions of the surrounded area. The Johannesburg Manufacturing Company Store was built in 1901 and remains standing in the center of the community. It was listed on the National Register of Historic Places in 2009.
- Vienna Corners is an unincorporated community located at the western edge of the township on the county line with Montmorency County at 44°58′13″N 84°22′15″W. It was the location of a post office known simply as Vienna from 1887 to 1913.

== History ==
Charlton Township is a community rich in history, as it emerged with lumbering and milling operations in 1875. Johannesburg was incorporated in 1901, home to the lumbering company of Johannesburg Mfg. Co., operated by the Sailing, Hanson and Michelson families. The town was named after Johanna Hanson, who is the wife of the president of the company. The company was responsible for much of the construction in the small town, including the development of a branch railroad line, which served as a lifeline for the town. At its peak, Johannesburg was a bustling community of 700. By 1929, 71 lumbering operations had ceased.

== Geography ==
According to the U.S. Census Bureau, the township has a total area of 102.20 square miles (264.70 km^{2}), of which 100.37 square miles (259.96 km^{2}) is land and 1.83 square miles (4.74 km^{2}) (1.79%) is water.

== Demographics ==
As of the census of 2000, there were 1,330 people, 552 households, and 416 families residing in the township. The population density was 13.3 inhabitants per square mile (5.1/km^{2}). There were 1,391 housing units at an average density of 13.9 per square mile (5.4/km^{2}). The racial makeup of the township was 98.42% White, 0.30% Native American, 0.15% Asian, and 1.13% from two or more races. Hispanic or Latino of any race were 0.23% of the population.

There were 552 households, out of which 24.6% had children under the age of 18 living with them, 66.8% were married couples living together, 4.2% had a female householder with no husband present, and 24.6% were non-families. 19.9% of all households were made up of individuals, and 8.9% had someone living alone who was 65 years of age or older. The average household size was 2.41 and the average family size was 2.74.

In the township the population was spread out, with 21.5% under the age of 18, 5.3% from 18 to 24, 24.2% from 25 to 44, 32.2% from 45 to 64, and 16.8% who were 65 years of age or older. The median age was 44 years. For every 100 females, there were 109.8 males. For every 100 females age 18 and over, there were 108.4 males.

The median income for a household in the township was $36,536, and the median income for a family was $41,200. Males had a median income of $32,578 versus $21,574 for females. The per capita income for the township was $20,211. About 3.3% of families and 6.5% of the population were below the poverty line, including 7.7% of those under age 18 and 3.2% of those age 65 or over.

== Images ==
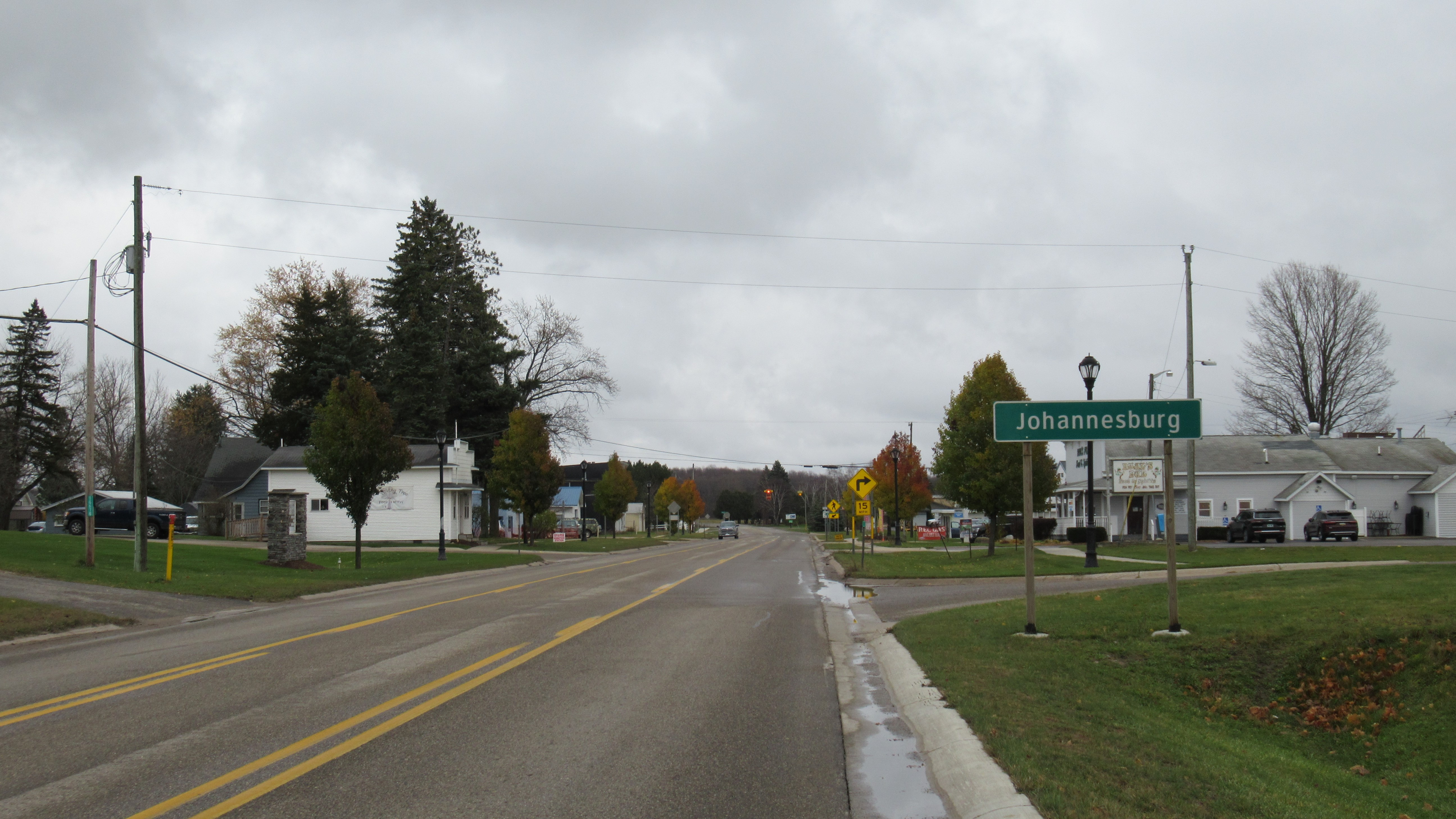
Community of Johannesburg along M-32

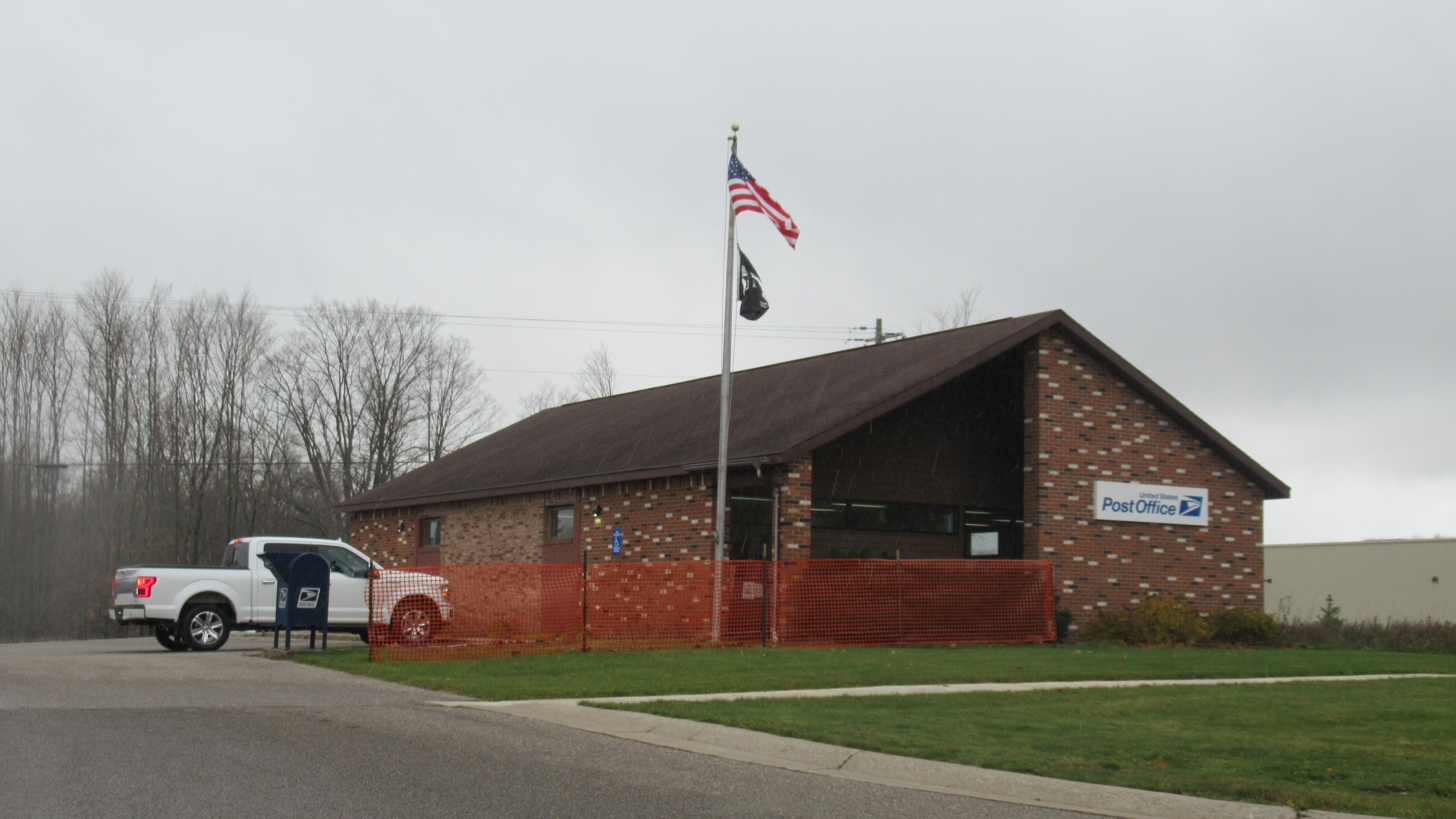
U.S. Post Office in Johannesburg

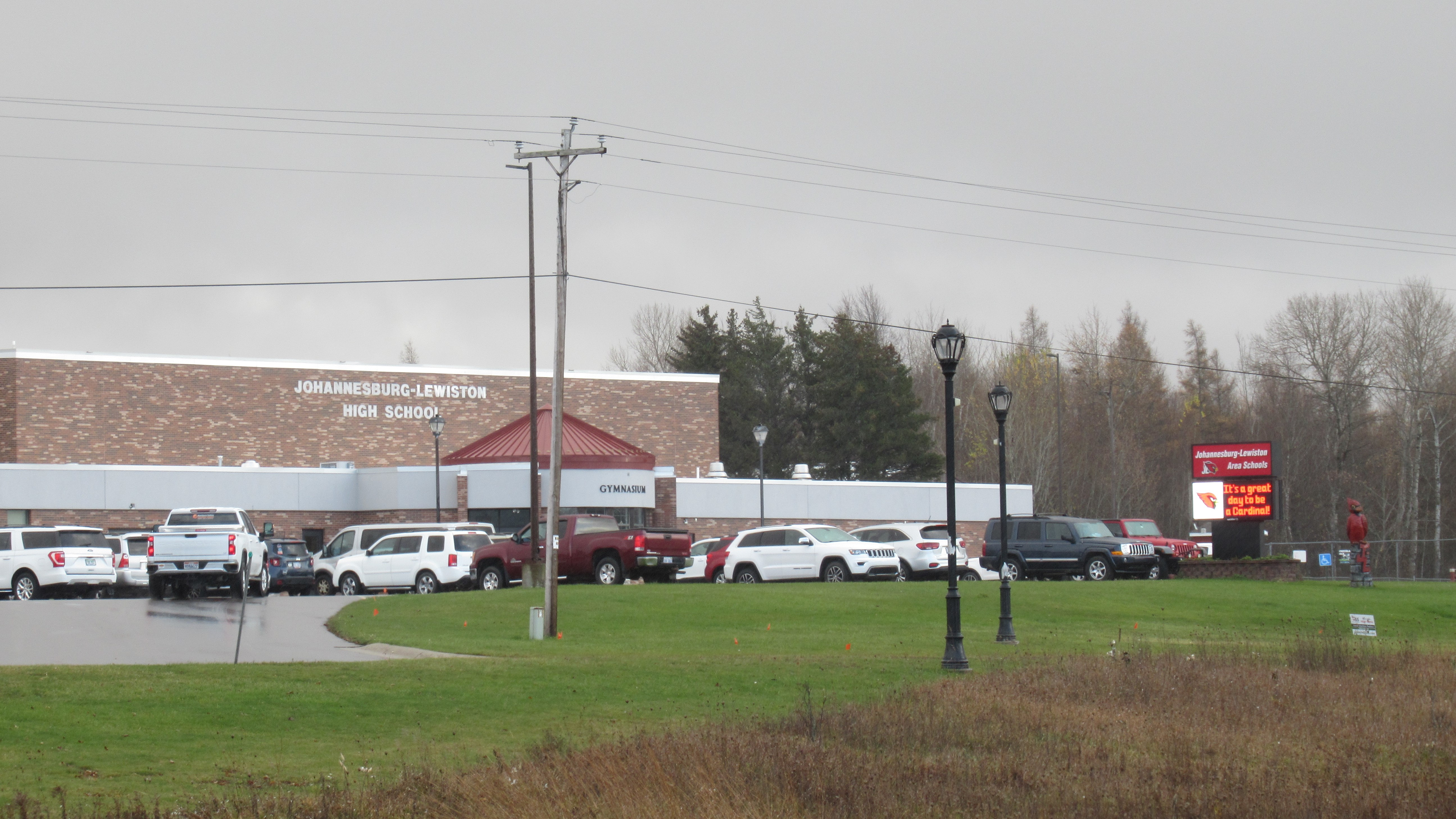
Johannesburg–Lewiston Area Schools

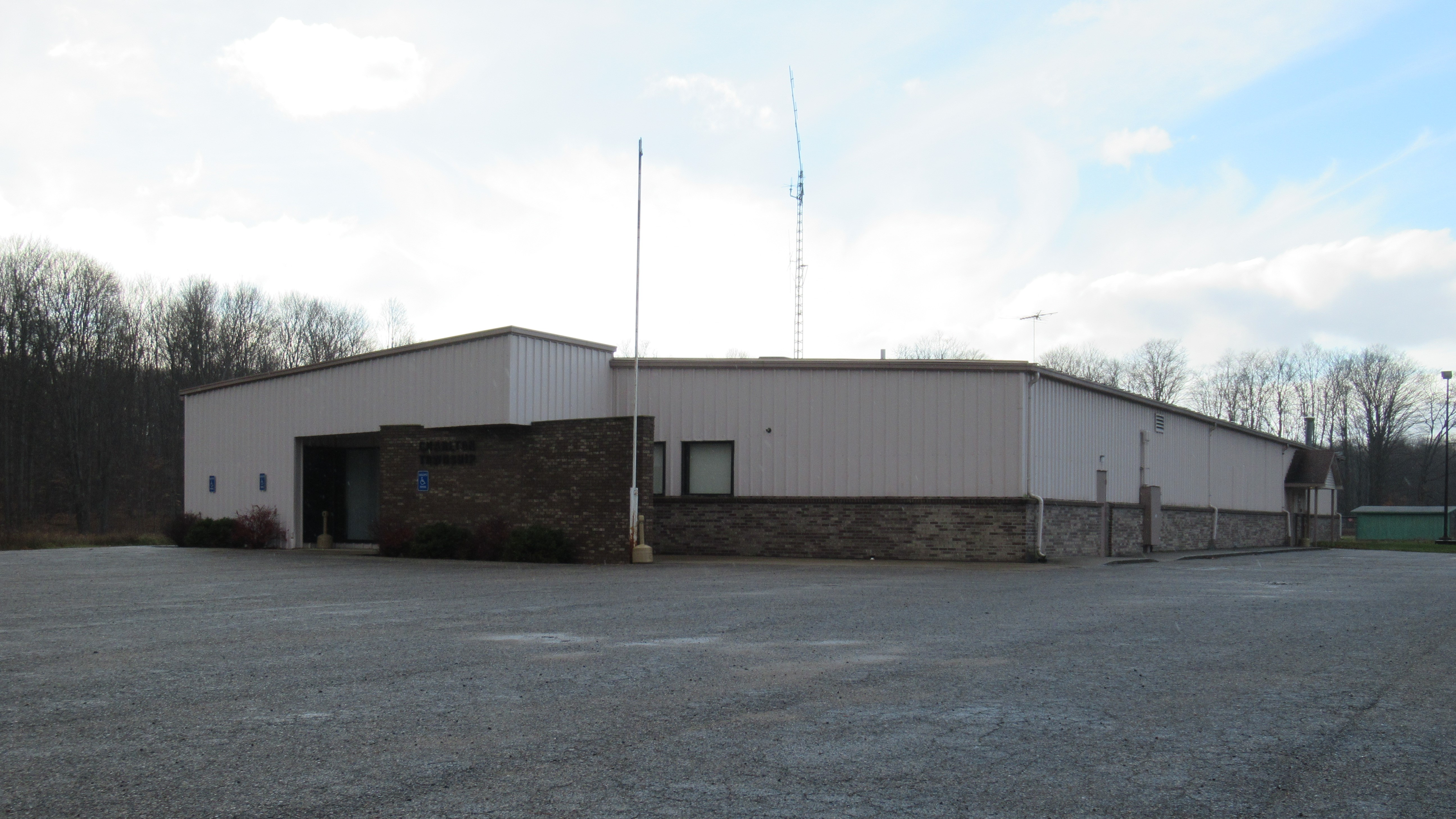
Former township hall
