= Johannesburg, Michigan =

Unincorporated community in Otsego County, Michigan

- Unincorporated community
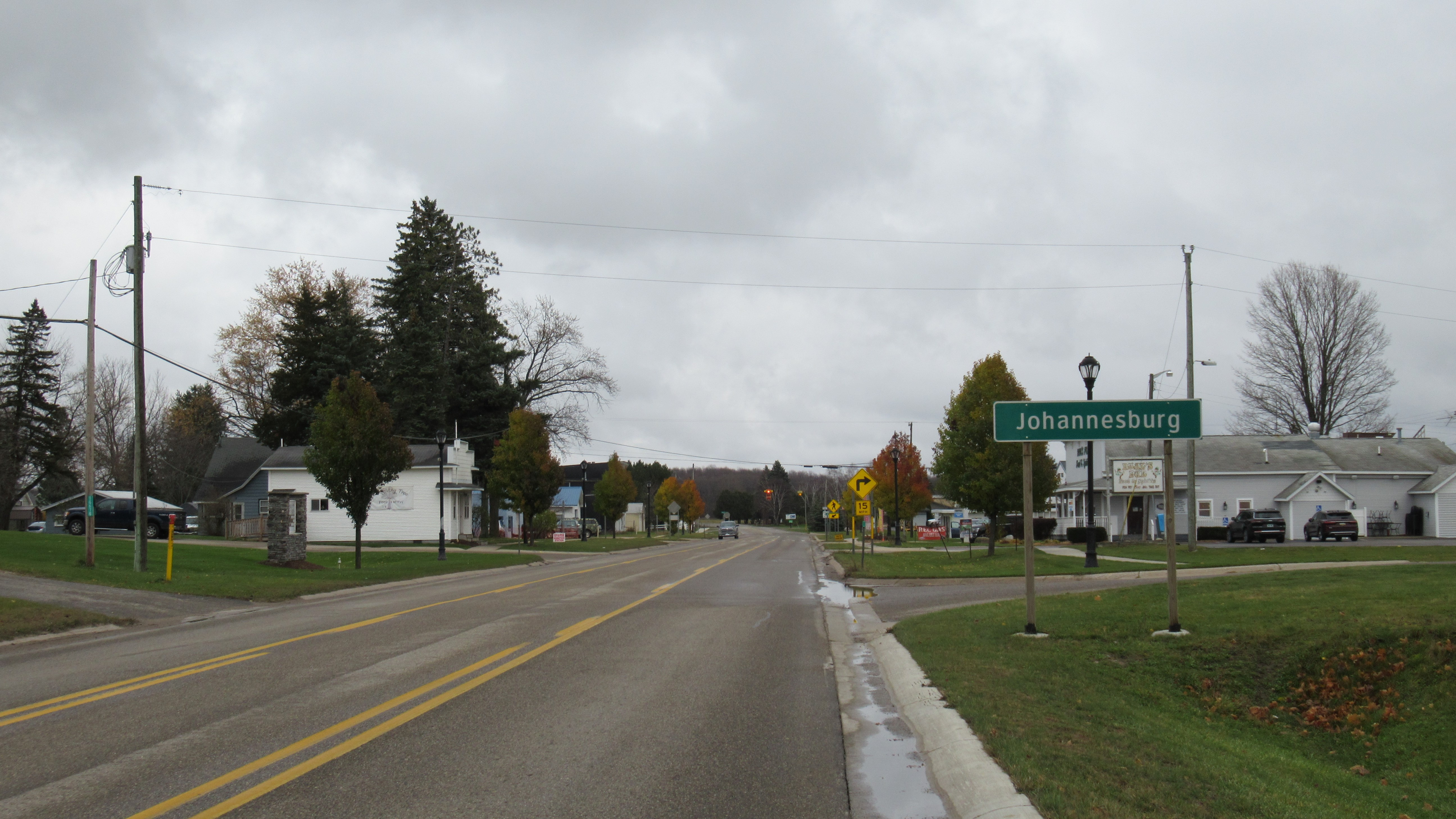
- Downtown Johannesburg
- Nickname: "Joburger"
- Location within Michigan Location within the United States
- Coordinates: 44°59′8″N 84°27′21″W
- Country: United States
- State: Michigan
- County: Otsego
- Township: Charlton
- Settled: 1901
- Elevation: 1,352 ft (412 m)
- Time zone: UTC-5 (Eastern (EST))
  - Summer (DST): UTC-4 (EDT)
- ZIP code(s): 49751
- Area code: 989
- GNIS feature ID: 629295

Johannesburg (/dʒoʊˈhænɪsbɜːrɡ/ joh-HAN-iss-burg) is an unincorporated community in Otsego County in the U.S. state of Michigan. Located within Charlton Township, the community lies between Gaylord and Atlanta along the route of M-32. As an unincorporated community, Johannesburg has no legally defined boundaries or population statistics of its own. However, a post office operates out of the community, with the ZIP Code 49751.

== History ==
A branch of the Michigan Central Railroad was constructed from Sallings to present-day Johannesburg in 1887. The location became home to the Johannesburg Manufacturing Company, a lumbering and milling company, and a community began to develop. The community took its name from Johanna Hanson, the wife of the president of the Johannesburg Manufacturing Company. A post office opened in Johannesburg in 1901, with Thorwald W. Hanson as its first postmaster.

== Geography ==
Johannesburg is located in eastern Otsego County. The community lies about 11 miles (18 km) east of Gaylord and about 15 miles (24 km) west of Atlanta. Johannesburg is part of Northern Michigan.

=== Major roadways ===
- M-32 is a prominent east–west state trunkline highway serving Northern Michigan. West of Johannesburg, the highway runs through East Jordan and Gaylord, where it can be used to access I-75. East of the community, the highway runs through Atlanta, Hillman, and Alpena.
- F-97 is a county-designated highway that has its northern terminus one mile (1.6 km) south of Johannesburg.

== Education ==
Johannesburg is served by Johannesburg-Lewiston Area Schools. The district operates public schools within the community, as well as in the nearby community of Lewiston in Montmorency County. Johannesburg-Lewiston High School is located in the community. School teams are called the "Cardinals".

== Images ==
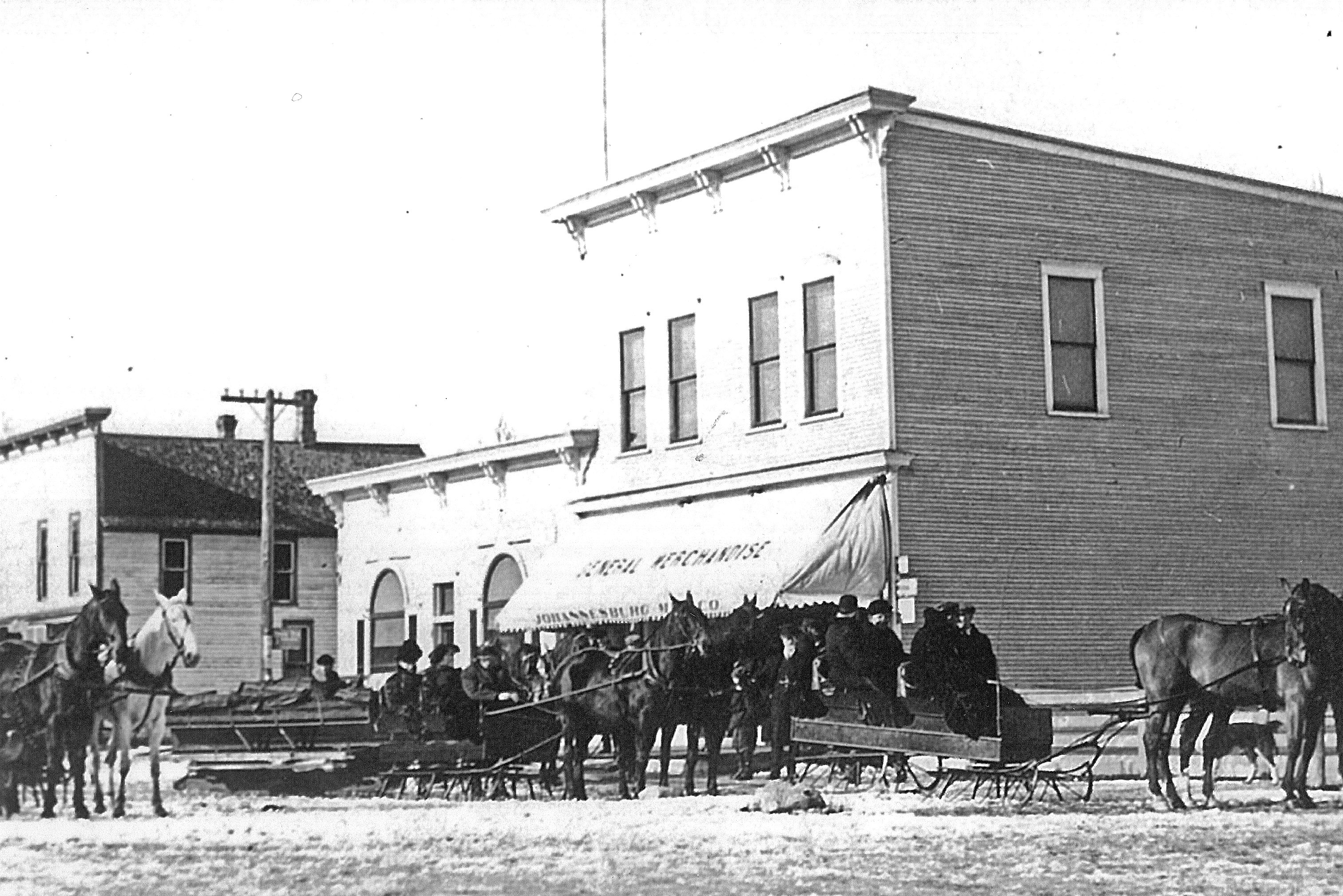
Downtown Johannesburg, c. 1906

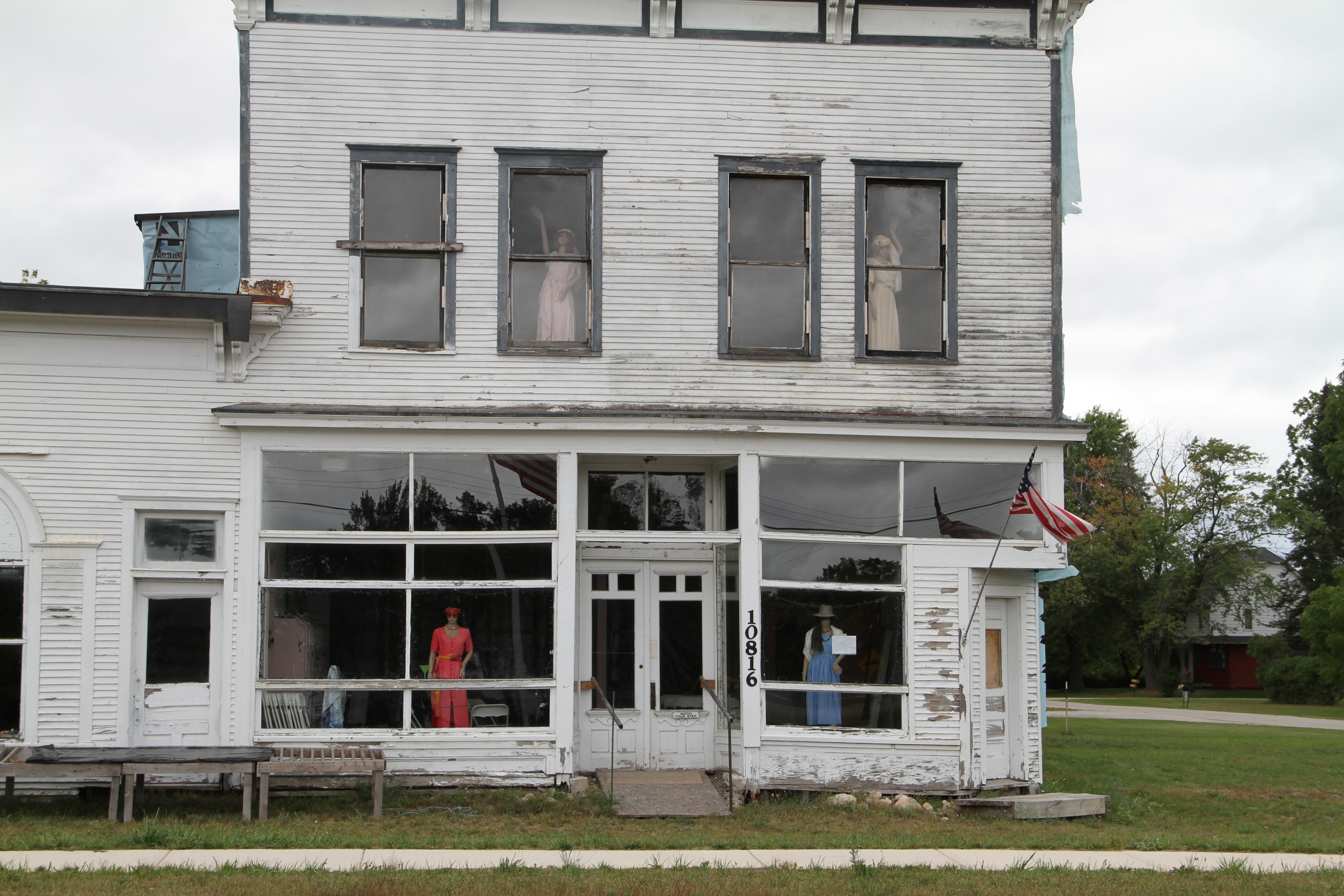
Johannesburg Manufacturing Company Store

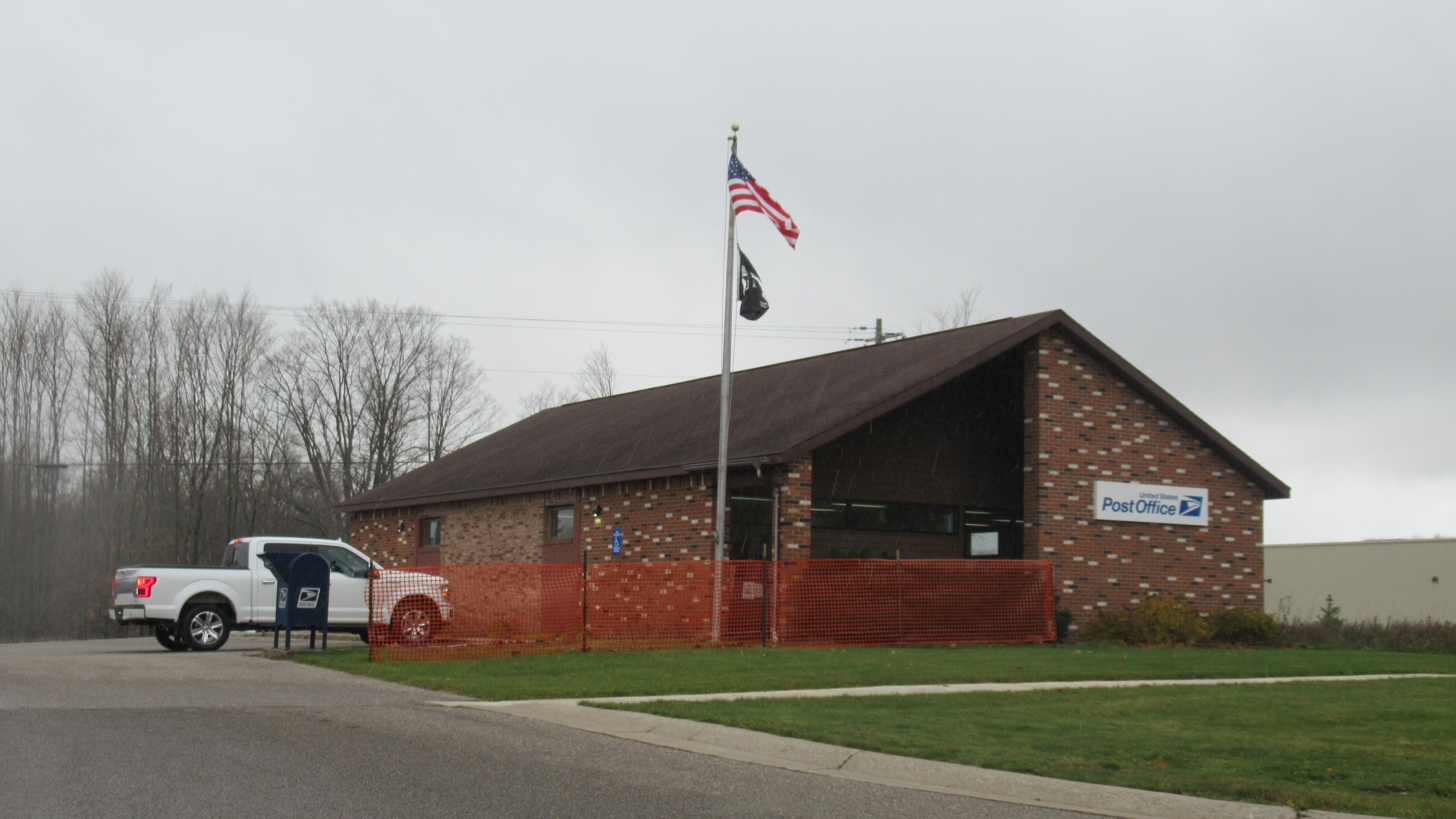
U.S. Post Office in Johannesburg

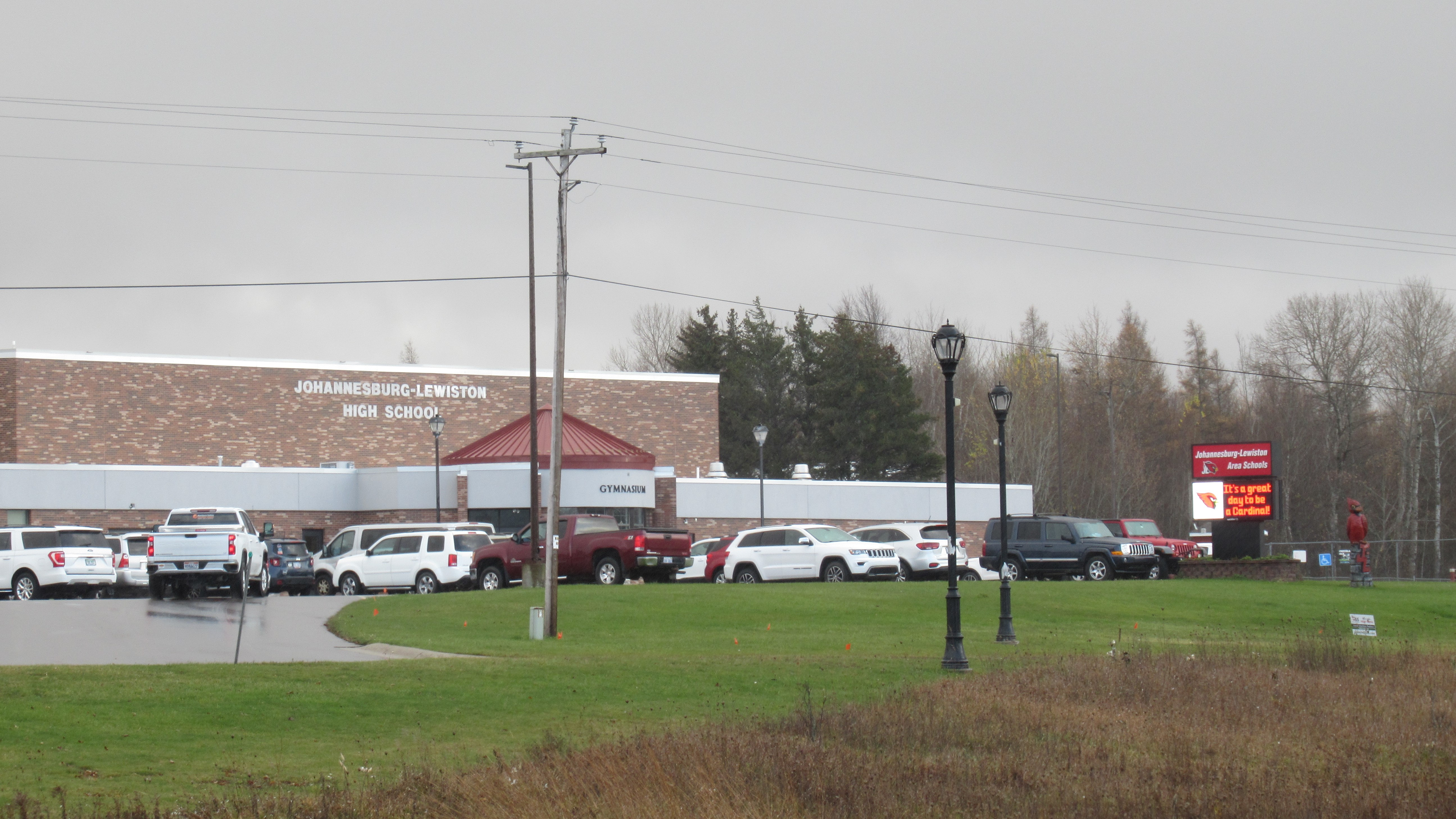
Johannesburg-Lewiston Area Schools

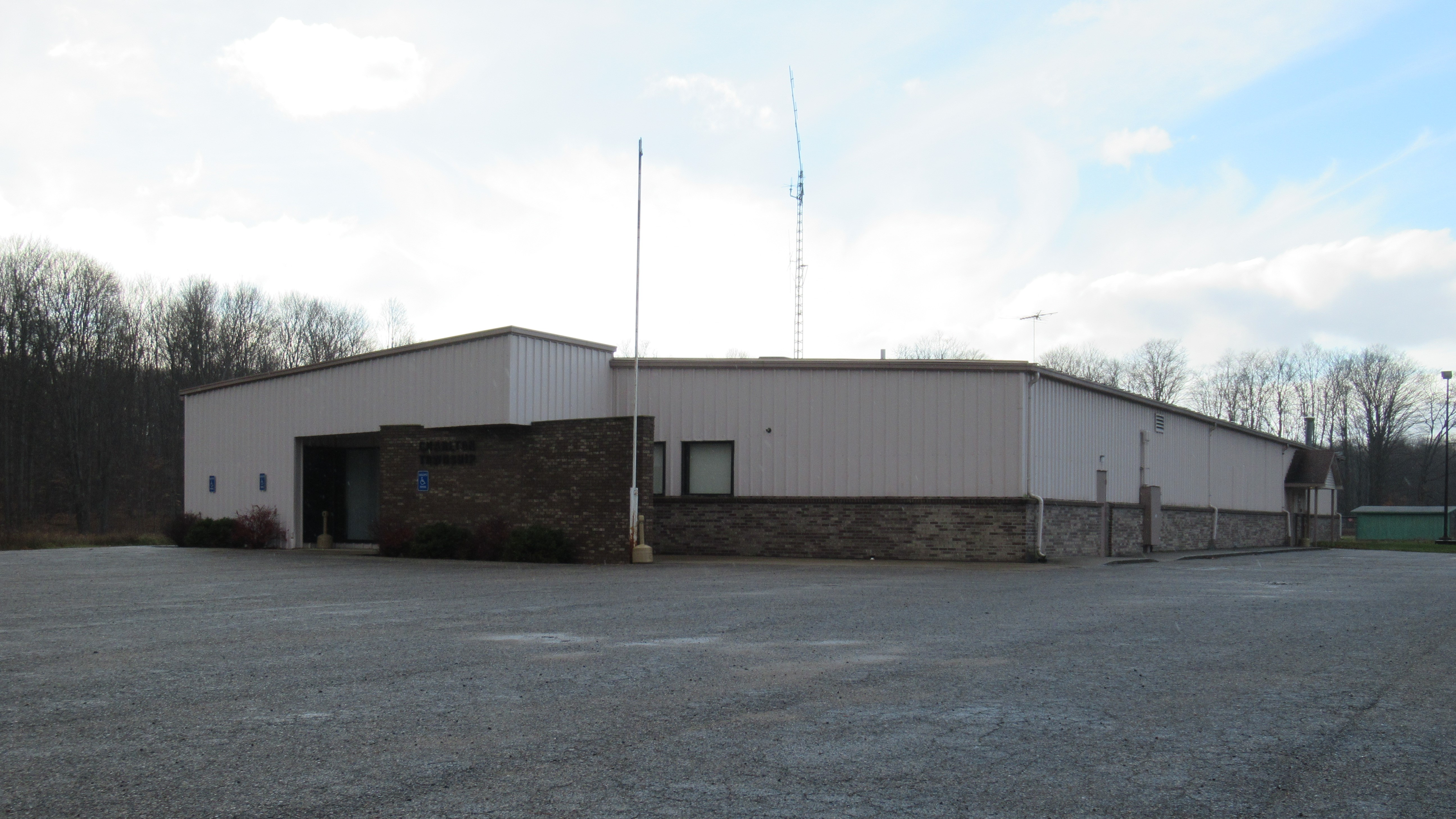
Former Charlton Township Hall

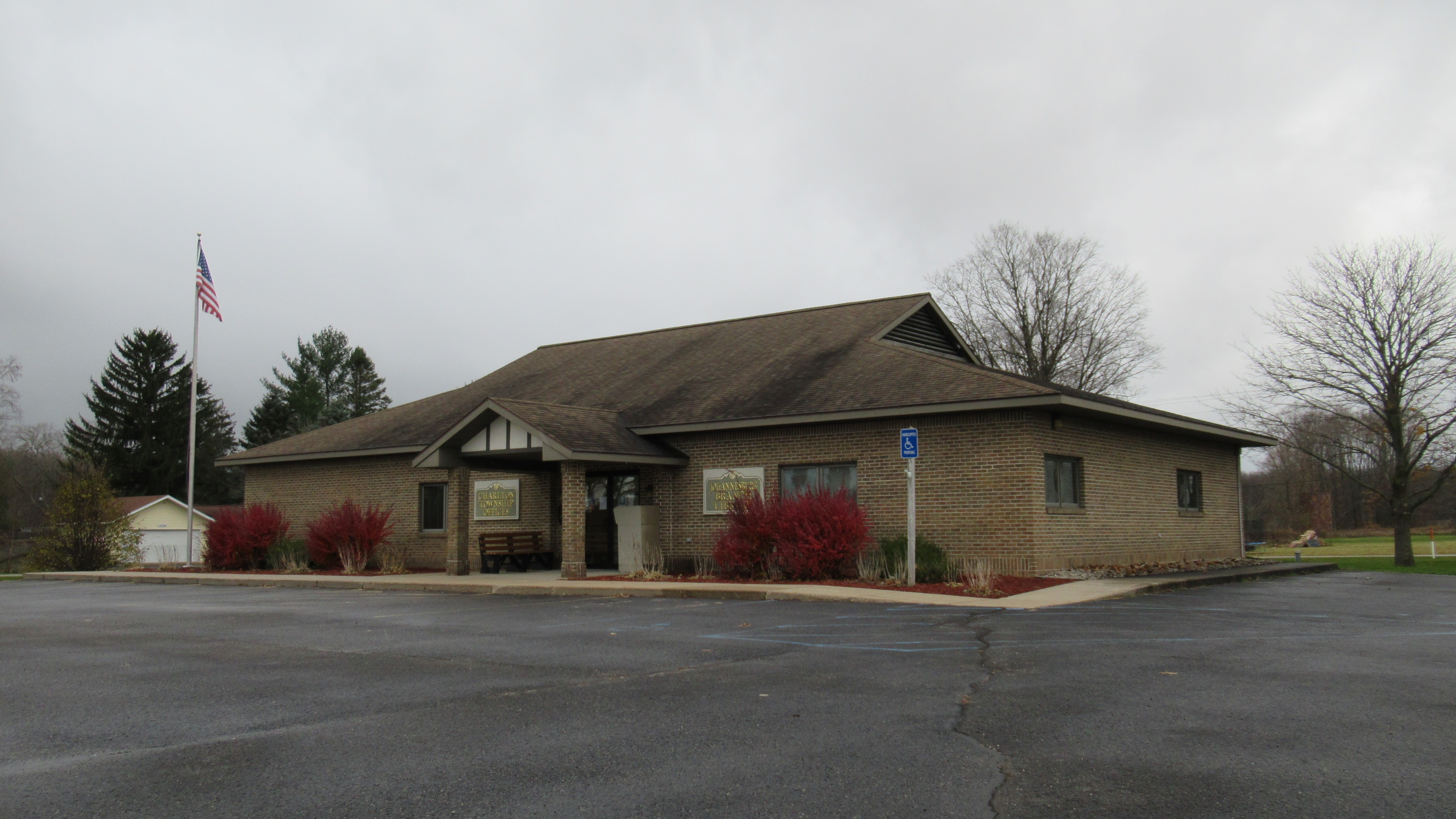
Charlton Township Hall and Johannesburg Branch Library
