= Johannesburg Manufacturing Company Store =

- U.S. National Register of Historic Places
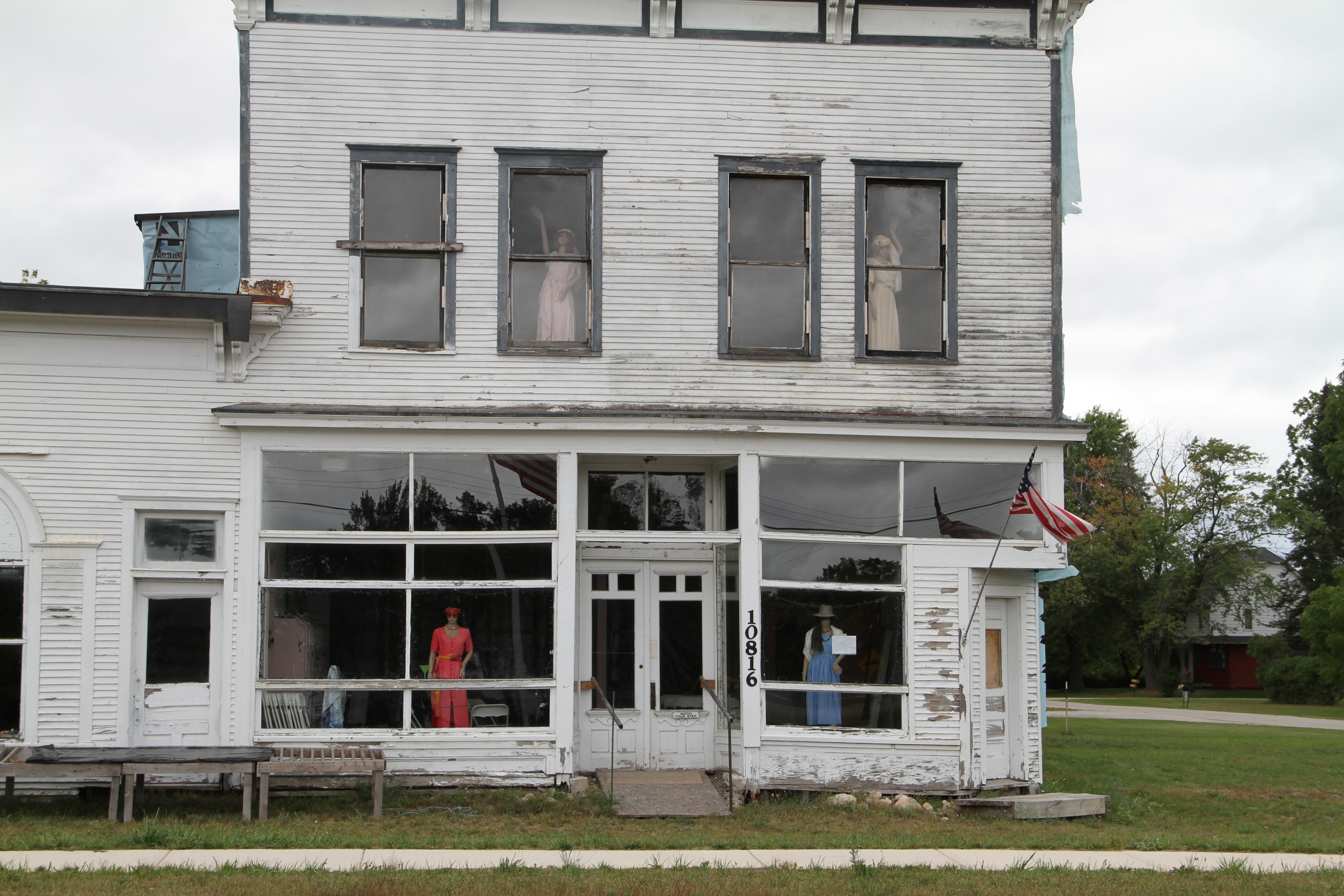

- Location within Michigan Location within the United States
- Interactive map
- Location: 10816 M-32 E., Johannesburg, Michigan
- Coordinates: 44°59′9″N 84°27′21″W
- Area: less than one acre
- Built: 1901
- Architectural style: Late Victorian
- NRHP reference No.: 09000475
- Added to NRHP: July 1, 2009

The Johannesburg Manufacturing Company Store is a company store located at 10816 M-32 East in Johannesburg, Michigan. It was listed on the National Register of Historic Places in 2009.

== History ==
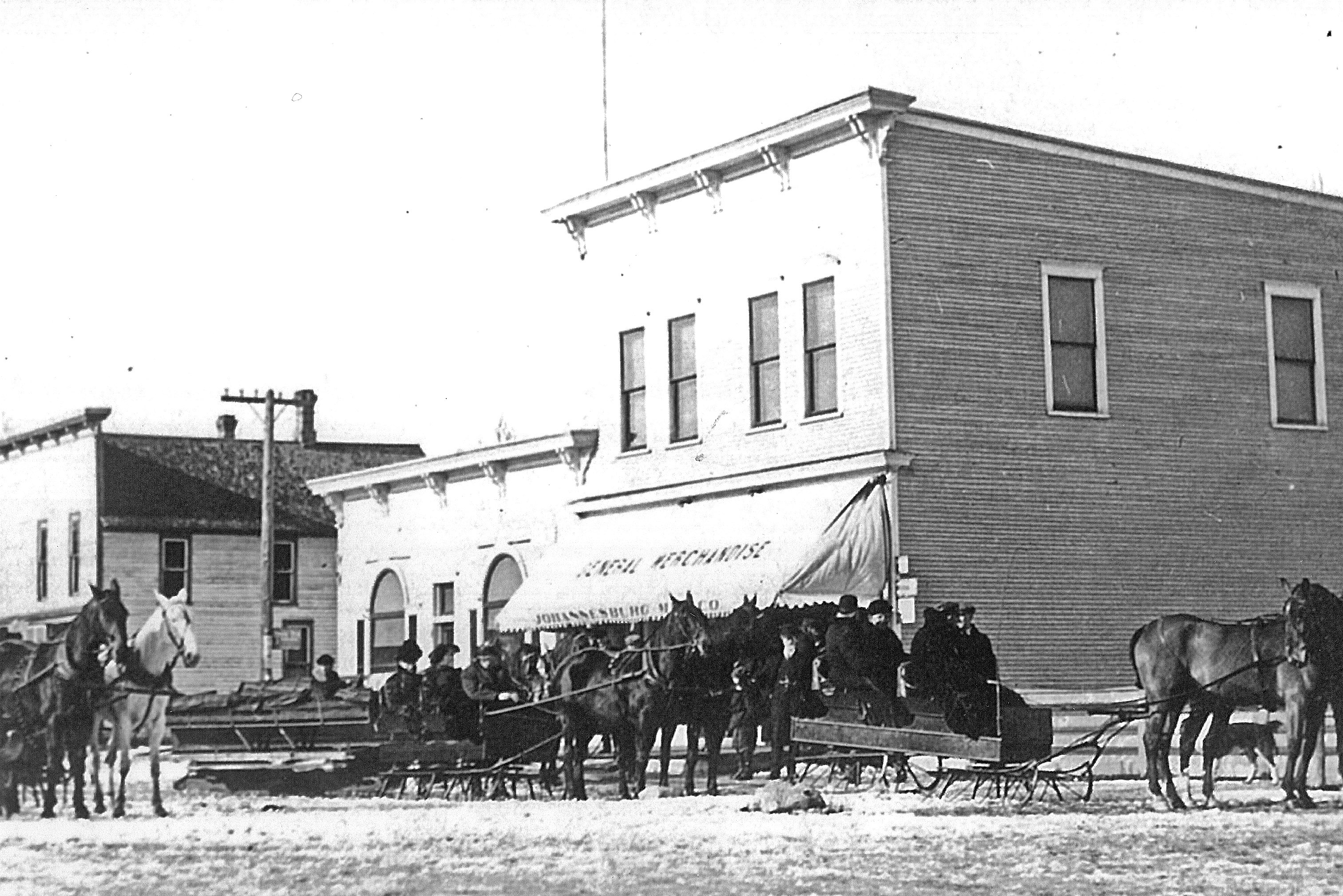
Johannesburg Manufacturing Company Store c 1906

The Johannesburg Manufacturing Company was incorporated in 1901 by lumbermen Ernest Salling, Rasmus Hanson, and Nels Michelson. The trio built Johannesburg as a lumber mill and company town, in the same way as they had built the nearby towns of Grayling, Salling, and Lewiston. The first building constructed in the new town was this company store, which was used as the headquarters of the company.

The store offered hay, grain, ice, and bulky items from sheds behind the store building. The building also housed the offices of the Johannesburg Manufacturing Company until 1916, when they moved to a nearby bank building. The Johannesburg Manufacturing Company lasted until 1929, with the mill cutting over 300 million board feet and employing as many as 200 people. When the mill ceased operations, the lands and buildings were offered for sale at inexpensive prices, with former employees getting preference. Company accountant Alfred Larsen purchased this building in 1929.

Larsen operated the store until 1942, when he sold the store to Andrew (Buck) Philips, who then sold it in 1945 to Howard Kelly. The Kellys operated the store until 1979, living in the upstairs space that had once housed the company offices. The building was vacant from 1979 to 1991, when it was sold again to William and Norma Lange who opened an antique store. The store closed a few years later, and in 2000 it was sold to Scott and Vicki Courtier. The Courtiers in turn sold it to Stacy Jo Schiller and Barton Briley, who as of 2010 planned to restore the building.

== Description ==
The Johannesburg Manufacturing Company Store is a flat=roofed balloon-frame building on a fieldstone foundation covered with clapboard and consisting of two parts: a deep rectangular two-story section, and smaller L-shaped one-story section attached to one side having the same setback as the larger section. The two-story section measures 28 feet by 80 feet. The single story section forms an L shape, 34 feet wide by 48 feet deep. An additional rectangular one-story extension was once behind the two-story portion, but was demolished in about 1970.

The two-story section has a first-floor storefront with large windows set on low paneled bulkheads. A recessed, slant-sided entrance is located in the center of the front facade and a second diagonal entry at the corner. The second floor of the two-story section contains paired square-head one-over-one windows. The single story section contains three entries, one in the center and one at each end. A pair of palladian windows is spaced between the entrances.

The interior of the building originally housed the company store on the first floor of the two-story section, with a rooming house upstairs. The one story part housed the company offices and a barber shop. One of the doors in the single-story section leads to a staircase to the upper floor of the two-story section.
