= West Branch-Rose City Area Schools =

School district in Michigan

Address
- 960 South M-33 West Branch, Ogemaw, Michigan, 48661; United States

District information
- Grades: Pre-Kindergarten-12
- Superintendent: Gail Hughey
- Schools: 4
- Budget: $27,638,000 2021-2022 expenditures
- NCES District ID: 2635850

Students and staff
- Students: 1,844 (2024-2025)
- Teachers: 118.43 (on an FTE basis) (2024-2025)
- Staff: 277.17 FTE (2024-2025)
- Student–teacher ratio: 15.57 (2024-2025)

Other information
- Website: www.wbrc.k12.mi.us

West Branch-Rose City Area Schools is a public school district in Northern Michigan. It serves most of Ogemaw County, including West Branch, Rose City, and the townships of Churchill, Cumming, Edwards, Foster, Goodar, Horton, Klacking, Ogemaw, Rose, and West Branch. It also serves parts of the townships of Hill, Logan, and Mills. In Gladwin County, it serves Clement Township and most of Bourret Township. It also serves part of Mentor Township in Oscoda County.

== History ==
Rose City High School was in existence by 1905, when it was first mentioned in a local newspaper.

The first class graduated from West Branch High School in 1906. The school at 147 State Street in West Branch formerly held all grades, including the high school. The first section was built around 1912, (Note: The source states that $25,000 in school construction bonds were issued about 1912, likely for the original section of the school at 147 State Street, which is shown extant in the 1955 yearbook. A 1968 source states that the 'oldest section' of the school was torn down and replaced by an addition. The possible 1912 section as shown in the 1955 yearbook is no longer extant, leaving the 1937 section as the oldest part of the building.) and a major expansion to house the high school was built in 1937, paid for by the Works Progress Administration. It also received additions around 1958, 1959, and 1969. In 1958, the Detroit Pistons used the West Branch gym for preseason practice.

Around 1964, plans were made to reorganize the public schools of Ogemaw County, merging West Branch and Rose City as well as the O'Connor school districts. Chester Surline was superintendent of West Branch school district around this time, and two schools are named after him.

West Branch and Rose City had separate high schools until the end of the 1967-1968 school year. The West Branch High School building, now Surline Middle School, housed a unique library of nearly five hundred instructional films, which were lent to surrounding school districts as well as used within the West Branch–Rose City district. Funding was provided in part by a federal grant under an experimental program called the Polaris Apollo Northeastern Michigan Study, which aimed to improve education in rural districts.

Funding was secured in 1968 to tear down the original section of the West Branch school and build a new addition in its place.

Ogemaw Heights High School opened in fall 1969, replacing West Branch High School and Rose City High School.

== Schools ==
Schools in West Branch-Rose City Area Schools district
School	Address	Notes
Ogemaw Heights High School	960 S. M-33, West Branch	Grades 9-12. Built 1969.
Surline Middle School	147 State Street, West Branch	Grades 5-8. Built 1937.
Rose City School	515 Harrington, Rose City	Grades PreK-6
Surline Elementary	147 State Street, West Branch	Grades PreK-4. Shares a building with Surline Middle School.
