= Ogemaw Heights High School =

Location
- 960 South M-33; West Branch, Michigan 48661; United States
- Coordinates: 44°18′24″N 84°07′39″W

Information
- Type: Public high school
- Established: 1968
- School district: West Branch-Rose City Area Schools
- Superintendent: Gail Hughey
- Principal: Trisha Ziegler
- Teaching staff: 28.01 (on an FTE basis)
- Grades: 9–12
- Enrollment: 556 (2023–2024)
- Student to teacher ratio: 19.85
- Colors: Brown; Gold
- Athletics conference: Jack Pine Conference
- Team name: Falcons
- Website: www.wbrc.k12.mi.us/our-schools/ogemaw-heights-high-school/

Ogemaw Heights High School (OHHS, also known as West Branch–Ogemaw Heights) is a public, coeducational secondary school in West Branch Township, Ogemaw County, Michigan. The school is part of the West Branch-Rose City Area Schools district, which serves the nearby cities of West Branch and Rose City.

== Demographics ==
The demographic breakdown for the 576 students enrolled in 2021-22 was:

- Male – 51.4%
- Female – 48.6%
- American Indian/Alaska Native – 1.2%
- Asian – 0.5%
- Black – 0.0%
- Hispanic – 1.9%
- Native Hawaiian/Pacific Islander – 0.2%
- White – 95.3%
- Multiracial – 0.9%

Additionally, 338 students (58.7%) were eligible for reduced-price or free lunch.
