= M-76 (Michigan highway) =

Former state highway in Michigan, United States

M-76
- M-76 highlighted in red on a modern map

Route information
- Maintained by MDSH
- Length: 61.187 mi (98.471 km)
- Existed: c. July 1, 1919–1973
- History: Replaced by I-75

Major junctions
- South end: US 23 in Standish
- M-55 at West Branch
- North end: US 27 in Grayling

Location
- Country: United States
- State: Michigan
- Counties: Arenac, Ogemaw, Roscommon, Crawford

Highway system
- Michigan State Trunkline Highway System; Interstate; US; State; Byways
← M-75	→ M-77

M-76 is a former state trunkline highway designation in the Lower Peninsula of the US state of Michigan. The highway's designation was decommissioned when the last section of it was converted to freeway as a part of the present-day Interstate 75 (I-75). At that time, M-76 extended from US Highway 23 (US 23) near Standish northwesterly to I-75 south of Grayling. Two sections of the route followed freeways with a two-lane highway in between to connect them. The former routing of M-76 through West Branch before that city was bypassed was initially redesignated Business M-76 (Bus. M-76).

First designated by 1919, M-76 initially terminated at Roscommon. It was later extended north through Grayling and west to Kalkaska in the 1920s. A second, disconnected, segment was added to the highway in the 1930s. By the early 1940s, both the disconnected section and the Kalkaska–Grayling were added to M-72. M-76 was converted in stages into a freeway in the late 1960s and early 1970s. When the last segment was completed, the number was removed from the highway, and the freeway was added to I-75.

== Route description ==
At the time the M-76 designation was decommissioned in 1973, most of the overall highway had been converted to freeway. It started southwest of Standish at an interchange with US 23 in southern Arenac County. The freeway ran northward to a junction with M-61 where it turned northwesterly. M-76 passed to the southwest of Sterling and over a tributary of the Tittabawassee River as the freeway approaches Alger. In Ogemaw County, the trunkline ran south and west of Greenwood and continued to the West Branch area. There, M-76 met the southeastern end of its business loop that ran north into downtown. The freeway bypassed the town to the southwest, passed over M-30 without an interchange and then met the northwestern end of the business loop. While M-76 was still an active highway designation, this second business loop junction marked the end of the freeway in the area. M-76 turned west, merging onto M-55 to run concurrently along a two-lane highway.

M-55/M-76 ran west into Roscommon County along West Branch Road. The two highways separated at a junction with St. Helen Road where M-76 turned due north toward St. Helen. South of town, the highway met county road F-97 at a junction with Artesia Beach Road. The two roads ran concurrently into town along the east end of Lake St. Helen. Near the airport in town, M-76 turned back northwesterly along Washington Street, parting from F-97 in the process. The highway ran along the northeastern shore of Lake St. Helen and near Mud Lake as it continued toward Roscommon. As it entered that town, the trunkline passed the Roscommon Conservation Airport and followed Elm Street on a northwest track through the middle of the village. M-18 joined M-76 in the center of town, and the two turned parallel to the Roscommon–Crawford county line on Federal Highway. Northeast of Higgins Lake, the highway transitioned to a freeway; that freeway ran northwest into Crawford County. M-18/M-76 terminated at a junction south of Grayling with US 27. This partial interchange marked the point where I-75 resumed its course north through the state. Traffic could not directly access southbound US 27 from northbound M-76 and northbound US 27 could not access southbound M-76.

== History ==
On July 1, 1919, the initial routing of M-76 connected Standish with Roscommon via a circuitous path through Sterling, Alger, West Branch, and St. Helen. By 1927, M-76 was extended north to Grayling and west to Kalkaska. Before the construction of its later routing along the present-day Lake State Railway between St. Helen and Roscommon, the route of M-76 followed present-day Saint Helen Road (present-day F-97), then Au Sable, Keno, and Silsby roads; at the Crawford-Roscommon county line, it then followed present-day M-18 westerly into Roscommon. A short non-contiguous segment of M-76 opened near Empire, extending eastward to County Road 669 in 1934. In late 1940 or early 1941, M-76 was truncated to Roscommon; all of M-76 from Grayling to Kalkaska and the segment near Empire was redesignated as M-72.

Beginning in 1958, I-75 in Michigan was constructed in several discontinuous segments. M-76 was to become one of the portions incorporated into the route of I-75. Although other portions of I-75 were completed and designated in noncontiguous segments, the portion from Standish to Roscommon was first signed as M-76 and the entire stretch rebuilt as freeway before it was redesignated as I-75. This was done while a temporary connecting To I-75 designation between Bay City and Grayling followed a different path along US 10 and US 27.

Starting in 1968 through the early 1970s, M-76 was rebuilt to Interstate standards in stages. The first freeway segment completed was a 17-mile (27 km) stretch in Arenac County from US 23 just southwest of Standish to Alger. In 1970, two more segments of the M-76 freeway were completed: from Alger to just south of West Branch and about 5 miles (8.0 km) of freeway from the southern end of a completed segment of I-75 south of Grayling to just west of Roscommon. In 1971, both the northern and southern sections of the M-76 freeway were extended: on the south, around the west side of West Branch to M-55, or from present-day exits 212 to 215; and on the north, on the west side of Roscommon, from present-day exits 244 to 239. In 1973, the final 25-mile (40 km) segment of M-76 freeway was completed. However, the entire M-76 designation was decommissioned and that segment of freeway opened as I-75. This was the final segment of I-75 to be completed in the state of Michigan.

As segments of the freeway were completed, the former portions of M-76 were turned over to local control, except for portions near Roscommon and West Branch, which became parts of Business Loop I-75 designations. There are several places where these old portions are referred to as "Old 76". The route from southeast of West Branch to the Ogemaw County line was designated as County Road F-9, and a portion through the community of St. Helen is part of F-97. The segment of old M-55/M-76 is an unsigned state highway.

== Major intersections ==
County	Location	mi	km	Destinations	Notes
Arenac	Lincoln Township	0.000	0.000	US 23	Southern terminus; southeastern end of freeway
Arenac	Lincoln Township	2.367	3.809	M-61	
Arenac	Adams Township	6.491	10.446	Sterling Road – Sterling	
Arenac	Moffatt Township	14.299	23.012	M-33 north	Southern terminus of M-33
Ogemaw	Horton Township	23.600	37.981	Bus. M-76 north	
Ogemaw	Ogemaw Township	27.152	43.697	Bus. M-76 south / M-55 east	Eastern end of M-55 concurrency; northwestern end of freeway
Roscommon	Richfield Township	34.121	54.912	M-55 west	Western end of M-55 concurrency
Roscommon	Richfield Township	37.254	59.955	F-97 south	Southern end of F-97 concurrency
Roscommon	St. Helen	38.920	62.636	F-97 north	Northern end of F-97 concurrency
Roscommon	Roscommon	51.625	83.082	M-18 south M-144 north	Eastern end of M-18 concurrency; southern terminus of M-144
Roscommon	Gerrish Township	55.275	88.956	Southeastern end of freeway	
Crawford	Beaver Creek Township	61.187	98.471	I-75 north – Mackinac Bridge US 27 south – Clare M-18 south	Northern terminus of M-18/M-76
1.000 mi = 1.609 km; 1.000 km = 0.621 mi: Concurrency terminus

== Business loop ==
Business M-76
- Location: West Branch
- Length: 5.525 mi (8.892 km)
- Existed: 1971–1973

Business M-76 (Bus. M-76) was a business loop running through West Branch that is now called Business Loop I-75 (BL I-75). The highway used a portion of the former M-76 and the current M-55. The southernmost portion from the Cook Road interchange at I-75 to OLD M-76 (Alger Road) was built as a new roadway in 1970. This section was built when the I-75/M-76 freeway was completed as far north as Cook Road. This new roadway allowed M-76 to connect to its former alignment south of West Branch in 1970. The next year, the I-75/M-76 freeway was completed to the current interchange with M-55 west of town. The former routing of M-76 along Cook Road, Alger Road and M-55 was redesignated as Bus. M-76. When the last section of I-75 was completed in 1973, connecting the end of the freeway at M-55 with the other end at M-18 near Roscommon, M-76 was completely decommissioned, and Bus. M-76 became BL I-75 with these changes. The total length of the highway was about 5 1/2 miles (8.9 km).

Major intersections
The entire highway was in Ogemaw County.

Location	mi	km	Destinations	Notes
Horton Township	0.000	0.000	M-76 – Standish, Grayling	
West Branch Township	1.552	2.498	Old 76	Formerly M-76
West Branch	2.495	4.015	M-55 east – Tawas City	Eastern end of M-55 concurrency
West Branch	3.593	5.782	M-30 south – Beaverton	Northern terminus of M-30
Ogemaw Township	5.525	8.892	M-55 west / M-76 – West Branch, Grayling	Western end of M-55 concurrency
1.000 mi = 1.609 km; 1.000 km = 0.621 mi: Concurrency terminus
