= M-33 (Michigan highway) =

State highway in Michigan, United States

M-33
- M-33 highlighted in red

Route information
- Maintained by MDOT
- Length: 121.858 mi (196.111 km)
- Existed: c. July 1, 1919–present

Major junctions
- South end: I-75 at Alger
- M-55 near West Branch; M-72 at Mio; M-32 at Atlanta; M-68 at Onaway
- North end: M-27 near Cheboygan

Location
- Country: United States
- State: Michigan
- Counties: Arenac, Ogemaw, Oscoda, Montmorency, Presque Isle, Cheboygan

Highway system
- Michigan State Trunkline Highway System; Interstate; US; State; Byways
← US 33	→ M-34

M-33 is a north–south state trunkline highway in the US state of Michigan that runs from Interstate 75 (I-75) at Alger in Arenac County north to M-27 near Cheboygan. In between, the trunkline runs through rural sections of the northeastern Lower Peninsula including state and national forest areas. M-33 connects to a handful of parks and crosses several of the rivers in that section of the state. It runs concurrently with three other state highways, sharing pavement to connect through several small communities of Northern Michigan.

M-33 was designated by 1919 along a section of the current highway between Mio and Atlanta. The highway also included roadway segments south of Mio that are now parts of other trunklines. The portion south of Mio was rerouted in the mid-1920s, transferring sections to M-72 in the process. The state started extending M-33 in both directions in the 1930s. The current highway segment between Onaway and Cheboygan was the former route of US Highway 23 (US 23) until 1940 when the latter highway was realigned onto an alignment that runs along Lake Huron. Several minor changes have been made to M-33's routing since the 1950s to straighten out curves or finish paving the highway.

== Route description ==
M-33 starts at exit 202 on I-75 near Alger. From there it crosses a branch of the Lake State Railway and Old 76 Road before turning north. The highway runs north parallel to the Rifle River across the Arenac–Ogemaw County line. It meets the eastern terminus of F-18 and continues through woodland to an intersection with M-55 east of West Branch. North of the junction, the environment transitions to farm land that borders the edge of the Au Sable State Forest to the Rose City area. North of Rose City, M-33 crosses into the Huron National Forest as the highway continues due north into Oscoda County, passing Mack Lake campground.

M-33 follows Morenci Avenue into the center of Mio where the highway joins M-72 south of Mio Pond, and they run concurrently together across the Mio Pond section of the Au Sable River out of town. On the north side of the river, F-32 merges in from the east and the three roadway designations run concurrently north. The highway continues to a sweeping 90° turn east near Smith Lake. F-32 separates to turn west and M-33/M-72 turns eastward. The trunkline continues to Fairview where M-33 turns north, leaving the M-72 concurrency to continue northward. M-33 crosses into the Mackinaw State Forest and passes through Comins. North of that unincorporated community, the highway curves northeast, east and back north to cross into Montmorency County. Before reaching M-32, M-33 crosses the Thunder Bay River. After the river, M-33 turns westward along M-32 to the community of Atlanta. The highway passes near the Atlanta Municipal Airport as it enters the community. In the middle of town, M-33 turns back north. The highway provides access to the Clear Lake State Park in northern Montmorency County before crossing into Presque Isle County.

M-33 parallels the Cheboygan – Presque Isle county line as it runs northward along the Black River to Onaway. Once in town, M-33 turns west with M-68 toward Cheboygan County. The highway passes through Tower, and a junction with F-05, before it continues west to the Afton area. There M-33 turns north one last time, running along the east shore of Mullett Lake past Aloha and M-212; M-212 is the shortest highway in Michigan that provides access to Aloha State Park. North of Aloha, M-33 crosses the Cheboygan River and meets M-27, the location of its northern terminus south of Cheboygan.

The Michigan Department of Transportation (MDOT) maintains M-33 like all other state trunkline highways in the state. As a part of these maintenance responsibilities, the department tracks traffic volumes using a metric called average annual daily traffic (AADT). This figure is a calculation of the traffic along a roadway segment for any average day of the year. In MDOT's surveys in 2009, they found that the peak AADT along M-33 was the 6,928 vehicles a day along a section of the M-72 concurrency. The lowest traffic counts were measured immediately south of the Onaway city limits at 956 vehicles daily. The only section of M-33 that has been listed on the National Highway System (NHS) is the segment concurrent with M-32 in Montmorency County. The NHS is a network of roads important to the country's defense, economy and mobility.

== History ==
M-33 was first designated by July 1, 1919. It ran along the current routing from Mio north to M-32 east of Atlanta. The highway also ran south of Mio to M-76 east of Roscommon using segments of what are now M-72 and M-144. By 1927, the southern section from Fairview to Roscommon was redesignated as a part of M-72. M-33 was shifted to run south of Mio to Rose City instead, creating the M-33/M-72 concurrency in the process. An extension was added by the end of the decade southward to M-55 at Campbell, a former community east of Selkirk in Ogemaw County. An earthen highway extension of M-33 north of Atlanta to US 23 at Onaway was opened in 1934. A few years later in 1938, M-55 was realigned to follow a more direct path east of West Branch. At the same time, M-33 was extended south by a few miles to the new roadway south of Campbell and Selkirk. A lengthy northern extension was added to M-33 in 1940 when US 23 was moved to a route along the Lake Huron shoreline between Rogers City and Cheboygan. The former route of US 23 between the Afton area and Rogers City was redesignated as a discontinuous section of M-68, and M-33 was extended westward from Onaway along that highway to Afton and north to US 27 (now M-27) near Cheboygan, creating the M-33/M-68 concurrency in southern Cheboygan and Presque Isle counties. By 1945, M-33 was extended southward again, this time to terminate at M-76 in Alger.

The Michigan State Highway Department rerouted M-33/M-72 near Fairview in late 1951 or early 1952, turning the former route back to local control. The last section of M-33 was paved in southern Cheboygan County in the late 1950s. In 1968, the southern end was extended slightly to end at the new M-76 freeway that opened between Alger and Standish; that freeway was redesignated as part of I-75 in 1973. A minor realignment of M-32/M-33 east of Atlanta smoothed out some curves in the road in 1996.

== Major intersections ==
County	Location	mi	km	Destinations	Notes
Arenac	Moffatt Township	0.000	0.000	I-75 – Saginaw, Mackinac Bridge	Southern terminus of M-33 at exit 202; roadway continues west as Alger Road
Ogemaw	Horton–Mills township line	3.312	5.330	F-18	
Ogemaw	West Branch–Churchill township line	10.255	16.504	M-55 – West Branch, Tawas City	
Oscoda	Mio	36.528	58.786	M-72 west – Grayling	Southern end of M-72 concurrency
Oscoda	Mio	37.289	60.011	F-32 east	Southern end of F-32 concurrency
Oscoda	Comins Township	41.700	67.110	F-32 west	Northern end of F-32 concurrency
Oscoda	Fairview	44.755	72.026	M-72 east – Harrisville	Northern end of M-72 concurrency
Montmorency	Avery Township	63.710	102.531	M-32 east – Alpena	Eastern end of M-32 concurrency
Montmorency	Atlanta	69.672	112.126	M-32 west – Gaylord	Western end of M-32 concurrency
Presque Isle	Onaway	95.135	153.105	M-68 east – Rogers City	Eastern end of M-68 concurrency
Cheboygan	Forest Township	96.792	155.772	F-05 north – Alverno	
Cheboygan	Koehler–Walker township line	105.473– 105.597	169.742– 169.942	M-68 west – Indian River	Western end of M-68 concurrency
Cheboygan	Aloha Township	116.379	187.294	M-212 west – Aloha	Access to Aloha State Park
Cheboygan	Inverness Township	121.858	196.111	M-27 – Cheboygan, Indian River	
1.000 mi = 1.609 km; 1.000 km = 0.621 mi: Concurrency terminus
