= List of highways numbered 76 Business =

Route 76 Business or Highway 76 Business may refer to:

- Interstate 76 Business (disambiguation)
- M-76 Business
