= Fred Curtis (baseball) =

American baseball player (1880-1939)

- First baseman
- Born: October 30, 1880; Beaver Lake, Michigan, U.S.
- Died: April 5, 1939 (aged 58); Minneapolis, Minnesota, U.S.
- Batted: Right Threw: Right

MLB debut
- July 24, 1905, for the New York Highlanders

Last MLB appearance
- July 25, 1905, for the New York Highlanders

MLB statistics
- Batting average: .222
- Home runs: 0
- Runs batted in: 2
- Stats at Baseball Reference

Teams
- New York Highlanders (1905)

Frederick Marion Curtis (October 30, 1880 – April 5, 1939) was an American Major League Baseball first baseman. Curtis played for the New York Highlanders in the 1905 season. In two career games, he had two hits, in 9 at-bats, a .222 batting average. He batted and threw right-handed.

Curtis was born in Beaver Lake, Michigan and died in Minneapolis, Minnesota.
