= Atlanta Municipal Airport (Michigan) =

Airport in Michigan, United States

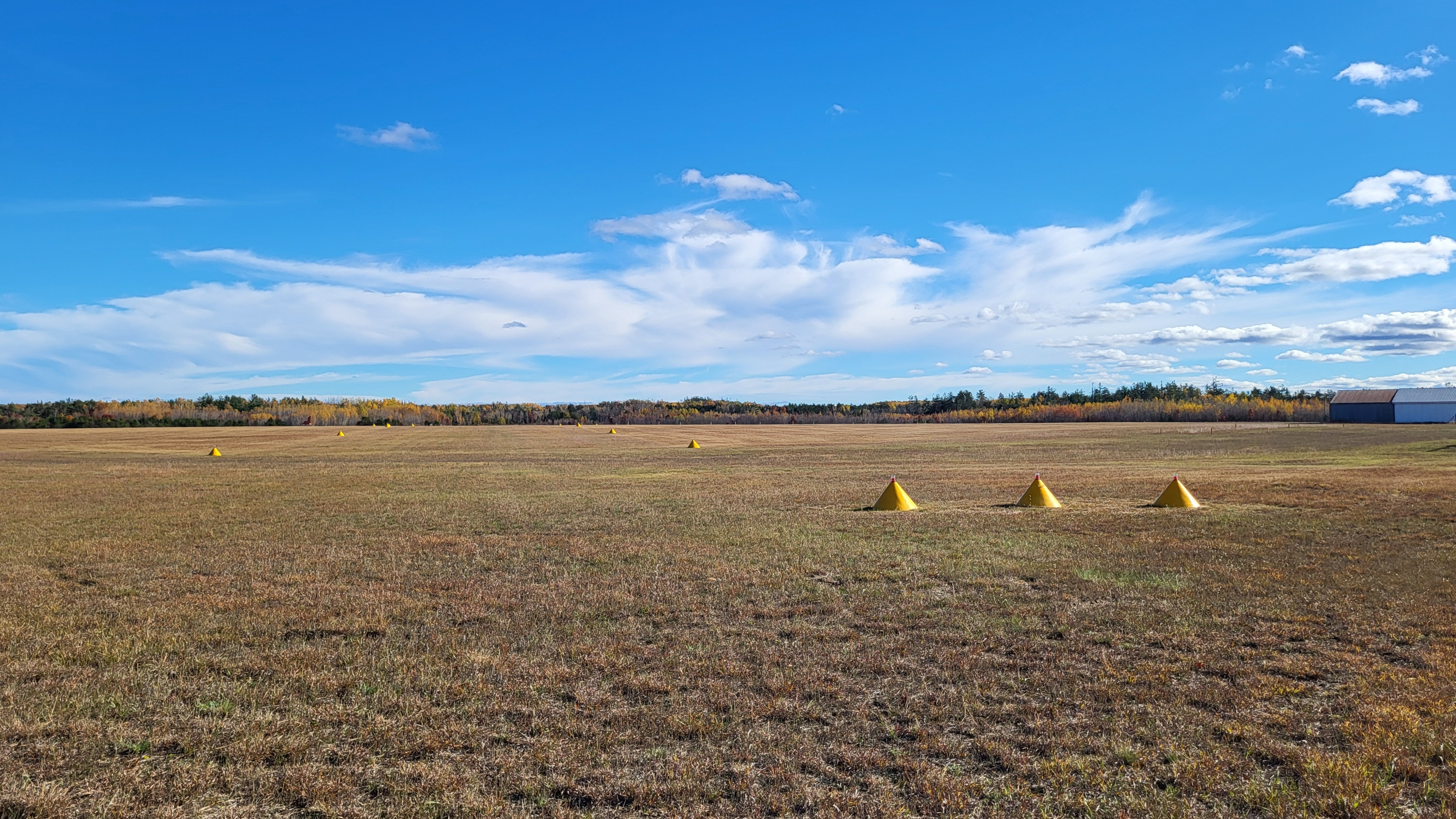
- IATA: none; ICAO: none; FAA LID: Y93

Summary
- Airport type: Public
- Owner: Briley & Avery Townships
- Serves: Atlanta, Michigan
- Elevation AMSL: 875 ft (267 m)
- Coordinates: 44°59′47″N 84°07′37″W

Map
- Location of airport in Michigan Y93 (the United States)

Runways
| Direction | Length | | Surface |
| Direction | ft | m | Surface |
|---|---|---|---|
| 5/23 | 3,000 | 914 | Asphalt |
| 13/31 | 3,223 | 982 | Turf |

Statistics (2021)
- Aircraft operations: 1,404
- Based aircraft: 9
- Source: Federal Aviation Administration

Atlanta Municipal Airport (FAA LID: Y93) is a public airport located one mile (2 km) southeast of the central business district of Atlanta in Montmorency County, Michigan, United States. The airport is owned by Briley Township and Avery Township. It is located at coordinates 44°59′47″N 84°07′37″W is accessible by road from Airport Road, located near M-32, and M-33. It is included in the Federal Aviation Administration (FAA) National Plan of Integrated Airport Systems for 2017–2021, in which it is categorized as a basic general aviation facility.

== Facilities and aircraft ==
Atlanta Municipal Airport covers an area of 172 acres (70 ha). It has two runways: 5/23 with an asphalt surface measuring 3,000 by 60 feet (914 by 18 m) and 13/31 with a turf surface measuring 3,223 by 100 feet (982 by 30 m). Runway 13/31 is closed from November through April each year and also when snow-covered. The airport is staffed upon request.

For the 12-month period ending December 31, 2021, the airport had 1,404 aircraft operations, an average of 27 per week, composed entirely of general aviation. There are 9 single-engine airplanes based at this airport.

The airport has an FBO that offers fuel to pilots.

== See also ==
- List of airports in Michigan
