= Rifle River State Recreation Area =

State park in Michigan, United States

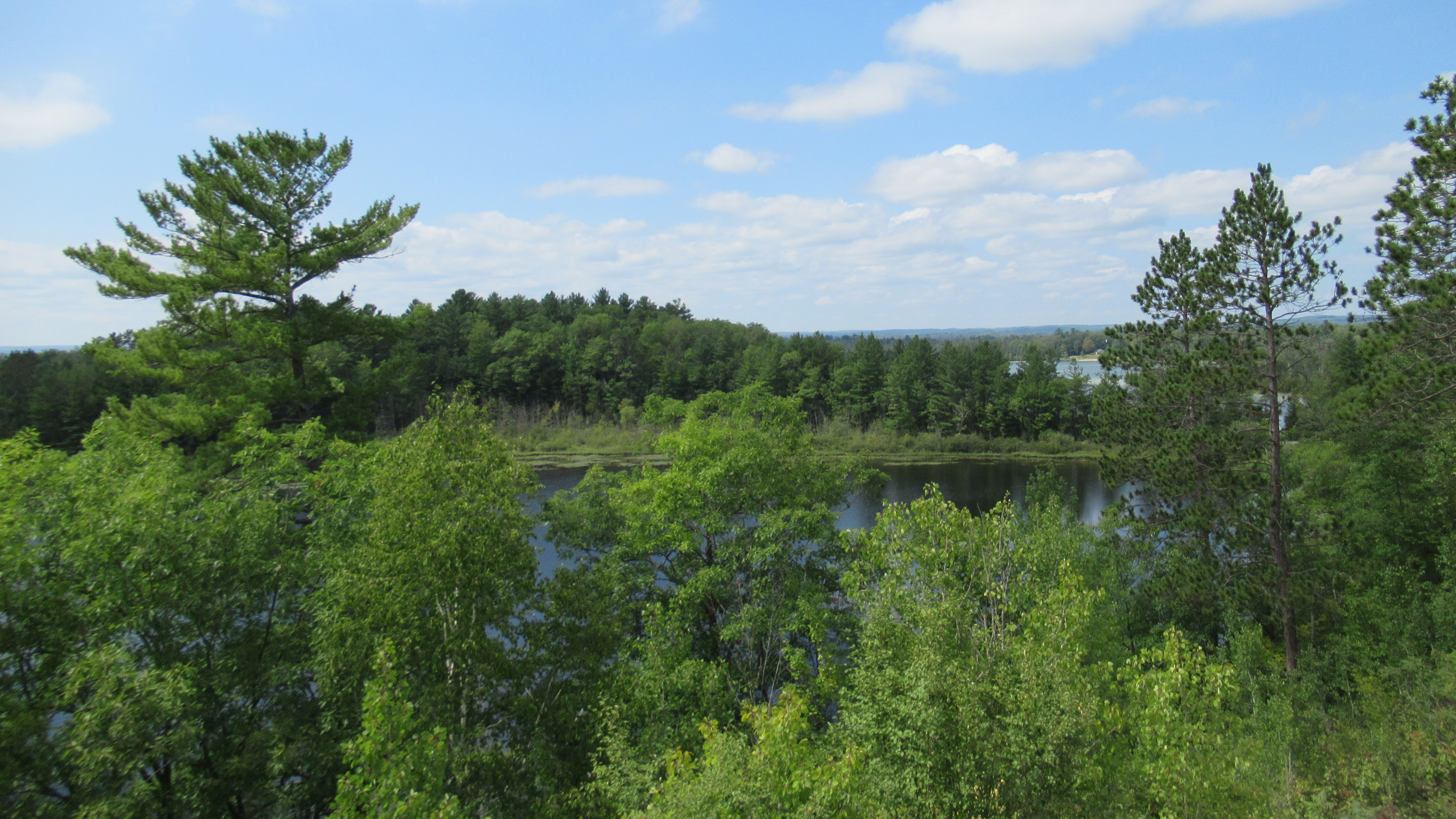
- View from the observation tower on Ridge Road

- Location within Michigan Location within the United States
- Location: Lower Peninsula, Ogemaw County, Michigan USA
- Nearest city: Rose City, Michigan
- Coordinates: 44°23′28″N 84°01′31″W
- Area: 4,449 acres (1,800 ha)
- Established: 1963
- Governing body: Michigan Department of Natural Resources
- Website: Official website

Rifle River State Recreation Area is a state park located on the upper reaches of the Rifle River within the Au Sable State Forest in Ogemaw County, in the U.S. state of Michigan. Covering 4,449 acres (1,800 ha), the area provides a variety of recreational opportunities, including boating, canoeing, hiking, hunting, fishing, cross-country skiing, biking, and swimming.

This area was formerly a private hunting and fishing retreat owned by Harry Mulford Jewett, president of the Paige-Detroit Motor Car Company, for whom the Jewett automobile was named. In 1945 the tract, then called Grousehaven, was purchased by the Michigan Department of Conservation from Mrs. Jewett after her husband's death. The Department of Conservation renamed it the Rifle River Area and used it as a field laboratory for fish and game research. In 1963, the Parks Division acquired the area and it is now known as the Rifle River State Recreation Area.

== Camping ==
Rifle River State Recreation Area offers 75 modern sites at Grousehaven Modern Campground with electricity, an accessible toilet and shower building, and a designated swim beach. Rifle River State Recreation Area also has three rustic campgrounds with a total of 99 rustic campsites with vault toilets, as well as five rustic cabins and a group use campground that accommodates groups up to 100.

The camping area includes a public beach, a playground, and a boat launch.

== Fishing ==
All lakes and waterways within Rifle River State Recreation Area are closed to boats with motors. Devoe Lake, Grousehaven Lake, Grebe Lake, and Lodge Lake are open to fishing. Jewett Lake is restricted to catch and release fishing with no live bait. Ice fishing is possible in the multiple lakes and streams.

Fisheries research has been conducted on thirteen-acre Jewett Lake, starting in 1945, and continuing to the present day.

Bluegills, bass, northern pike, yellow perch and trout can be found in Devoe, Grousehaven, Lodge, and Grebe lakes. Brook, brown and rainbow trout are present throughout the many miles of streams in the recreation area.

== Trails ==
The area's 14 miles of trails allow for hiking, snowshoeing, and cross country skiing.
