= Foster Township, Michigan =

- Civil township
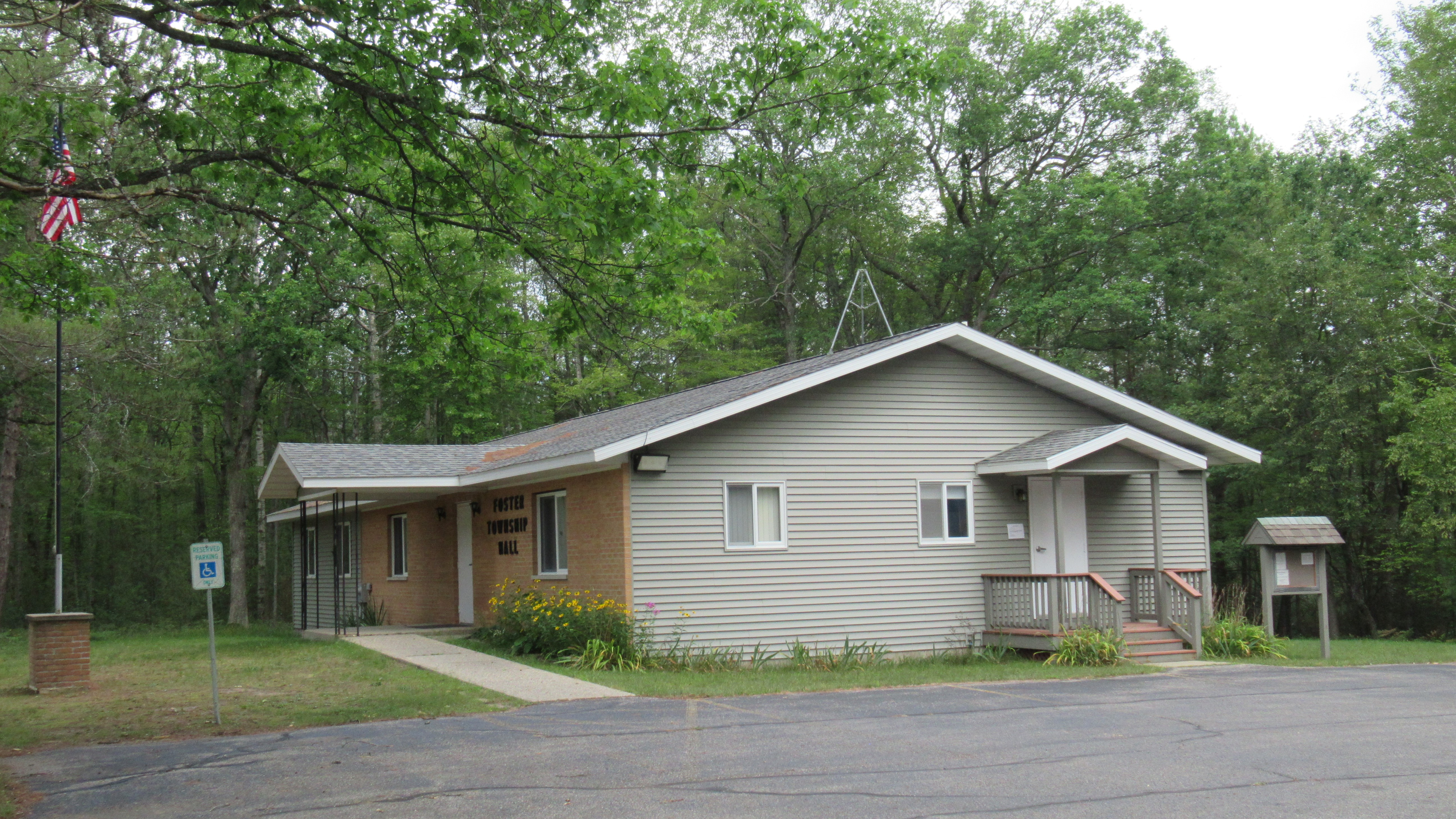
- Foster Township Hall

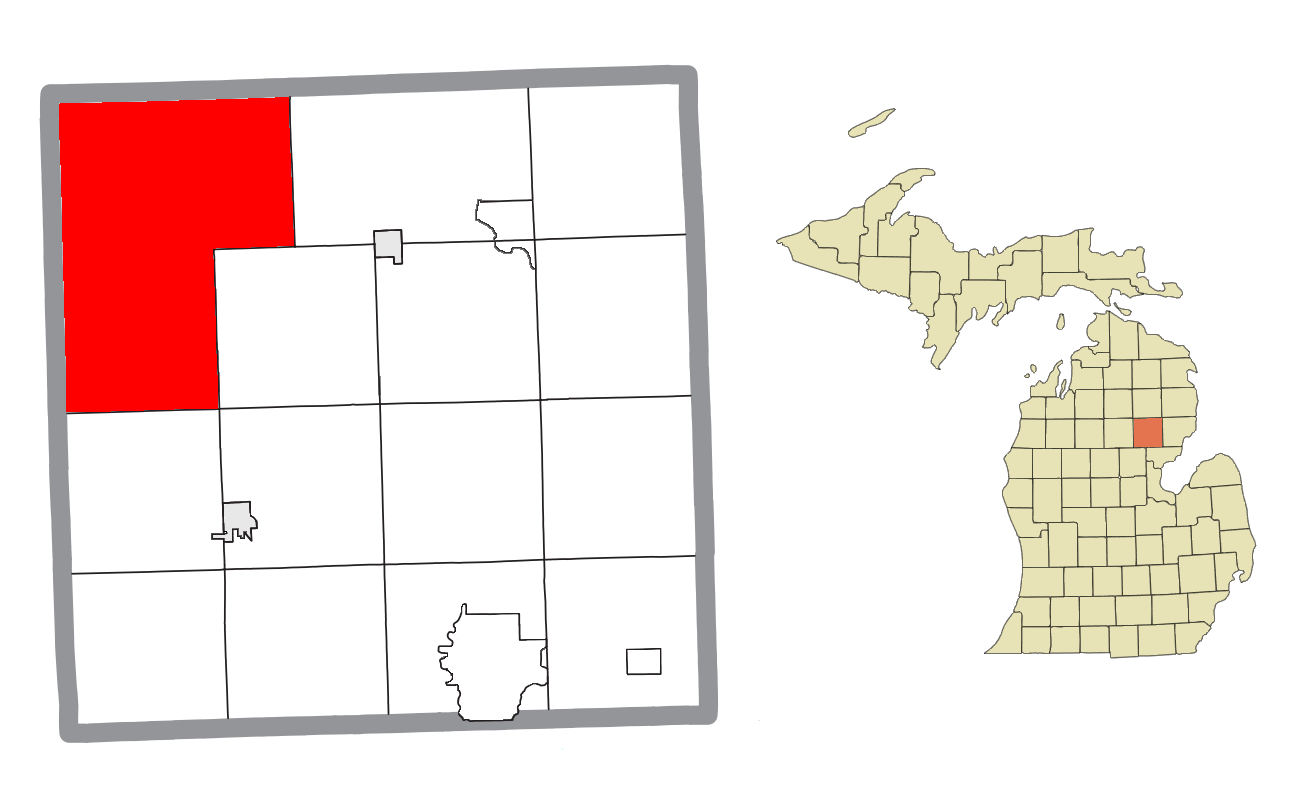
- Location within Ogemaw County

- Location within the state of Michigan Location within the United States
- Coordinates: 44°26′22″N 84°16′27″W
- Country: United States
- State: Michigan
- County: Ogemaw

Government
  - Supervisor: Sandra Miller
  - Clerk: Karen McIntyre

Area
  - Total: 89.89 sq mi (232.8 km^{2})
  - Land: 89.23 sq mi (231.1 km^{2})
  - Water: 0.66 sq mi (1.7 km^{2})
- Elevation: 1,243 ft (379 m)

Population (2020)
  - Total: 788
  - Density: 8.83/sq mi (3.41/km^{2})
- Time zone: UTC-5 (Eastern (EST))
  - Summer (DST): UTC-4 (EDT)
- ZIP code(s): 48636 (Luzerne); 48654 (Rose City); 48656 (St. Helen); 48661 (West Branch)
- Area code: 989
- FIPS code: 26-29860
- GNIS feature ID: 1626301
- Website: https://www.fostertownship.com/

Foster Township is a civil township of Ogemaw County in the U.S. state of Michigan. The population was 788 at the 2020 census.

== Communities ==
- Damon is an unincorporated community located at 44°28′39″N 84°13′42″W. It is a former lumbering community that was established in 1878. Damon had its own post office from 1880–1911. It also has its own graveyard located at 44°27'49.3"N 84°13'42.5"W.

== Geography ==
According to the United States Census Bureau, the township has a total area of 89.89 square miles (232.81 km^{2}), of which 89.23 square miles (231.10 km^{2}) is land and 0.66 square miles (1.71 km^{2}) (0.73%) is water. It is the largest municipality by land area in Ogemaw County.

== Demographics ==
As of the census of 2000, there were 821 people, 362 households, and 250 families residing in the township. The population density was 9.2 inhabitants per square mile (3.6/km^{2}). There were 970 housing units at an average density of 10.9 per square mile (4.2/km^{2}). The racial makeup of the township was 99.27% White, and 0.73% from two or more races. Hispanic or Latino of any race were 0.97% of the population.

There were 362 households, out of which 22.1% had children under the age of 18 living with them, 57.7% were married couples living together, 8.8% had a female householder with no husband present, and 30.7% were non-families. 26.8% of all households were made up of individuals, and 9.7% had someone living alone who was 65 years of age or older. The average household size was 2.27 and the average family size was 2.72.

In the township the population was spread out, with 20.8% under the age of 18, 3.9% from 18 to 24, 23.4% from 25 to 44, 30.5% from 45 to 64, and 21.4% who were 65 years of age or older. The median age was 46 years. For every 100 females, there were 102.2 males. For every 100 females age 18 and over, there were 97.6 males.

The median income for a household in the township was $29,091, and the median income for a family was $35,750. Males had a median income of $31,354 versus $21,875 for females. The per capita income for the township was $17,319. About 9.6% of families and 13.4% of the population were below the poverty line, including 22.4% of those under age 18 and 2.9% of those age 65 or over.
