= Klacking Township, Michigan =

- Civil township
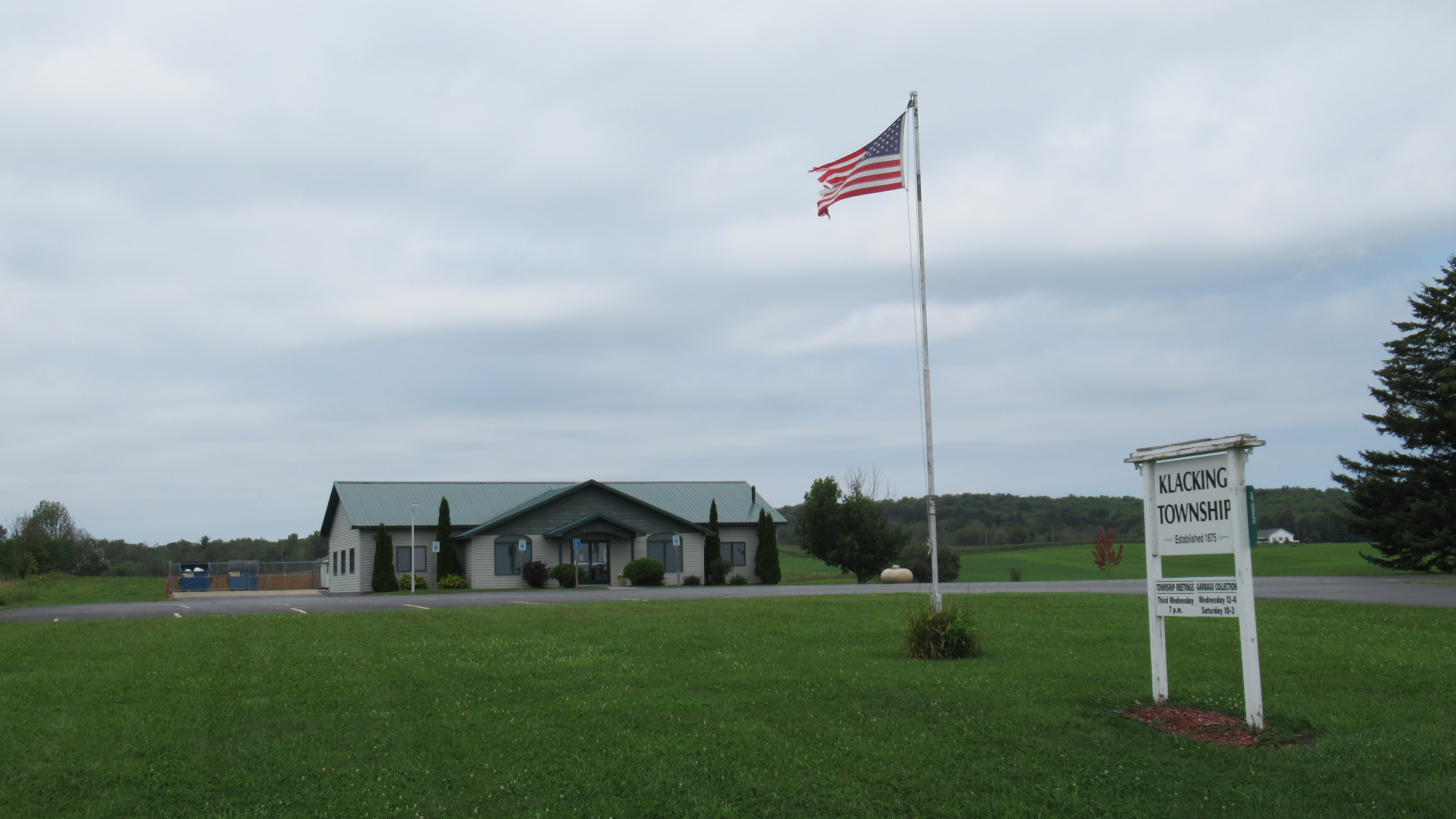
- Klacking Township Hall

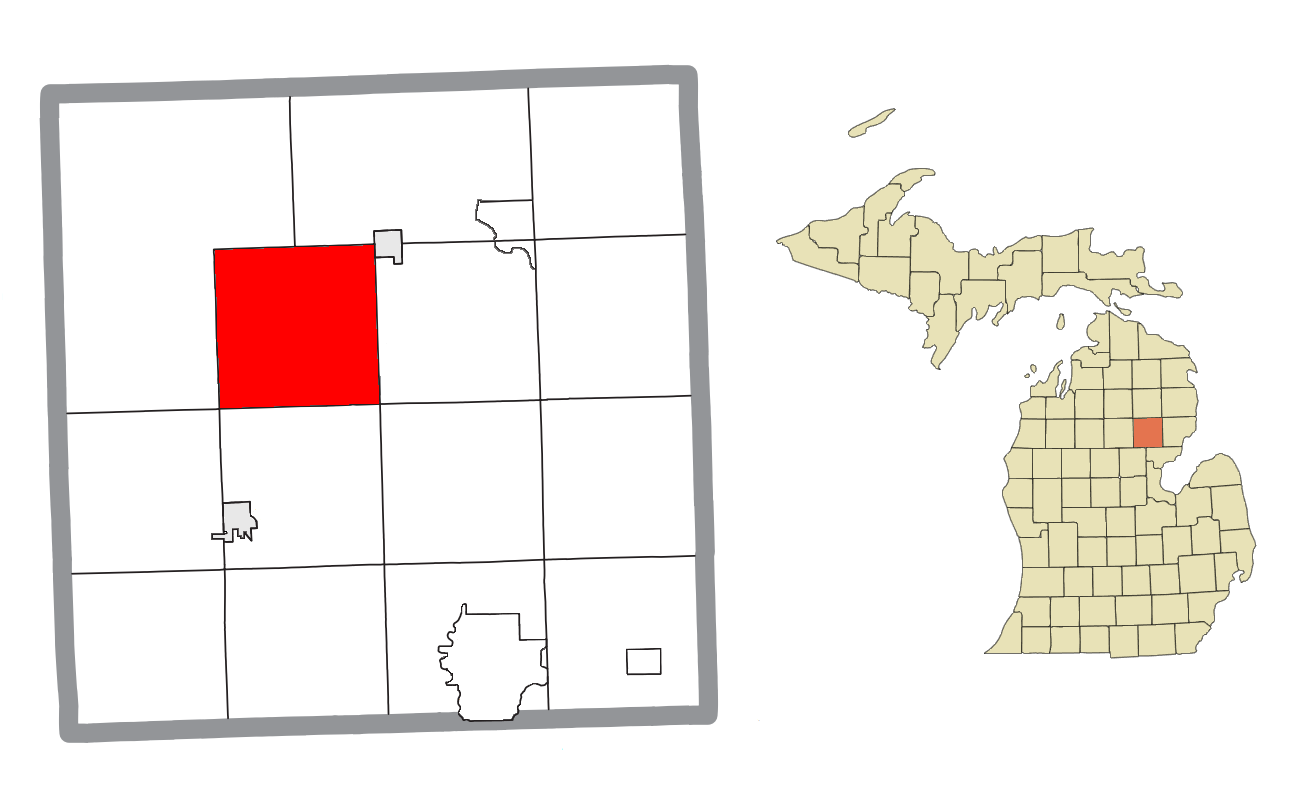
- Location within Ogemaw County

- Location within the state of Michigan Location within the United States
- Coordinates: 44°22′34″N 84°11′24″W
- Country: United States
- State: Michigan
- County: Ogemaw
- Established: 1875

Government
  - Supervisor: Debra Thomas
  - Clerk: Vondola Schmitt

Area
  - Total: 35.95 sq mi (93.11 km^{2})
  - Land: 35.89 sq mi (92.95 km^{2})
  - Water: 0.062 sq mi (0.16 km^{2})
- Elevation: 1,260 ft (384 m)

Population (2020)
  - Total: 572
  - Density: 15.9/sq mi (6.15/km^{2})
- Time zone: UTC-5 (Eastern (EST))
  - Summer (DST): UTC-4 (EDT)
- ZIP code(s): 48654 (Rose City); 48661 (West Branch)
- Area code: 989
- FIPS code: 26-43640
- GNIS feature ID: 1626564
- Website: https://klackingtownshipmi.gov/

Klacking Township is a civil township of Ogemaw County in the U.S. state of Michigan. The population was 572 at the 2020 census.

== Communities ==
- Beaver Lake was a former village established in 1872 by George G. Damon as a lumbering village. A station on the Michigan Central Railroad was established here in 1873 and a post office in 1875.

== Geography ==
According to the U.S. Census Bureau, the township has a total area of 35.95 square miles (93.11 km^{2}), of which 35.89 square miles (92.95 km^{2}) is land and 0.06 square miles (0.16 km^{2}) (0.17%) is water.

== Demographics ==
As of the census of 2000, there were 617 people, 244 households, and 183 families residing in the township. The population density was 17.2 inhabitants per square mile (6.6/km^{2}). There were 434 housing units at an average density of 12.1 per square mile (4.7/km^{2}). The racial makeup of the township was 98.70% White, 0.65% African American, 0.16% Native American, and 0.49% from two or more races. Hispanic or Latino of any race were 2.59% of the population.

There were 244 households, out of which 27.5% had children under the age of 18 living with them, 66.4% were married couples living together, 6.1% had a female householder with no husband present, and 24.6% were non-families. 19.7% of all households were made up of individuals, and 7.8% had someone living alone who was 65 years of age or older. The average household size was 2.53 and the average family size was 2.91.

In the township the population was spread out, with 23.8% under the age of 18, 6.3% from 18 to 24, 24.3% from 25 to 44, 30.6% from 45 to 64, and 14.9% who were 65 years of age or older. The median age was 43 years. For every 100 females, there were 107.0 males. For every 100 females age 18 and over, there were 111.7 males.

The median income for a household in the township was $40,625, and the median income for a family was $44,063. Males had a median income of $35,694 versus $24,063 for females. The per capita income for the township was $16,238. About 6.1% of families and 8.8% of the population were below the poverty line, including 19.5% of those under age 18 and 5.3% of those age 65 or over.
