= Ogemaw Township, Michigan =

- Civil township
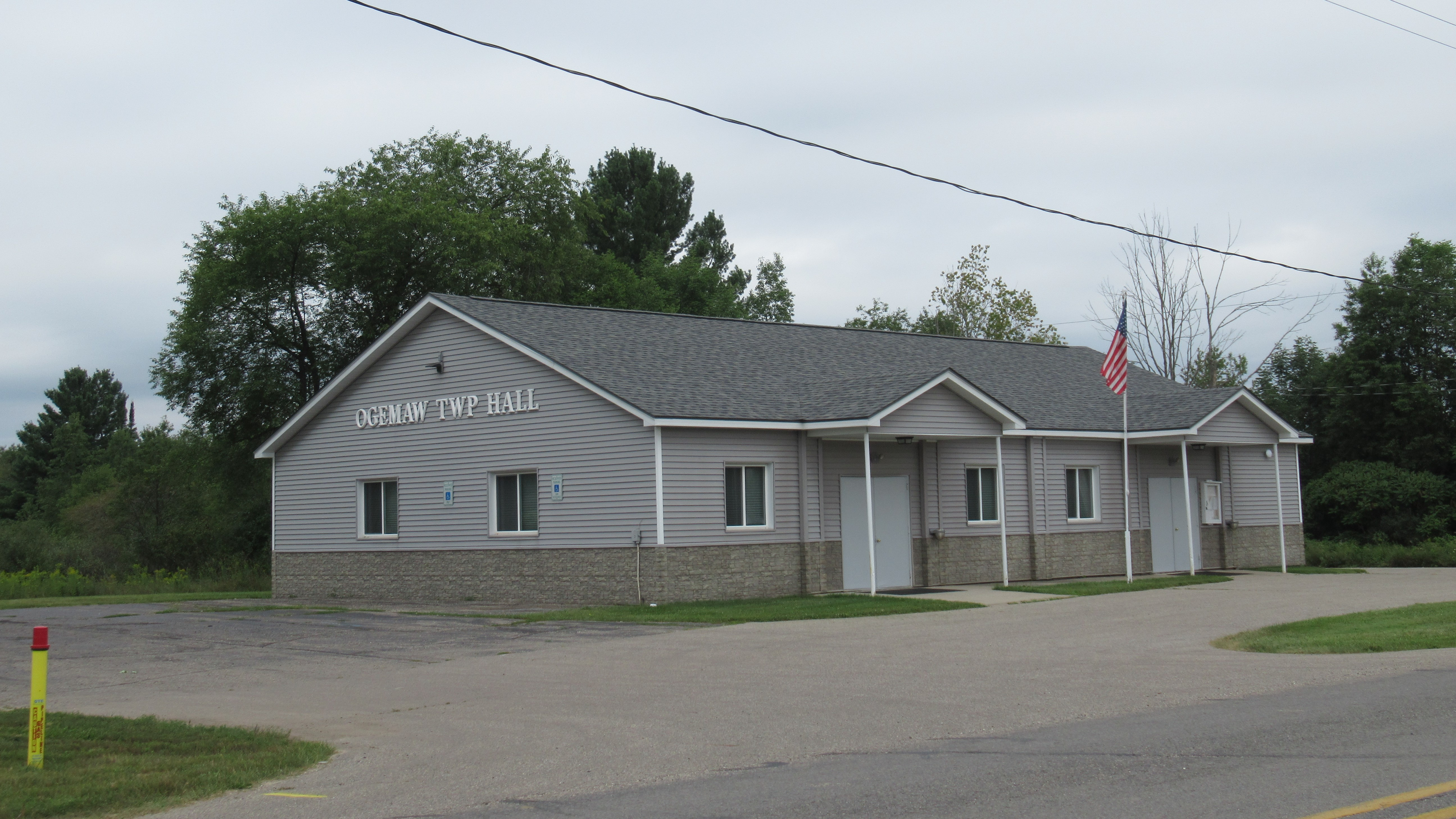
- Ogemaw Township Hall

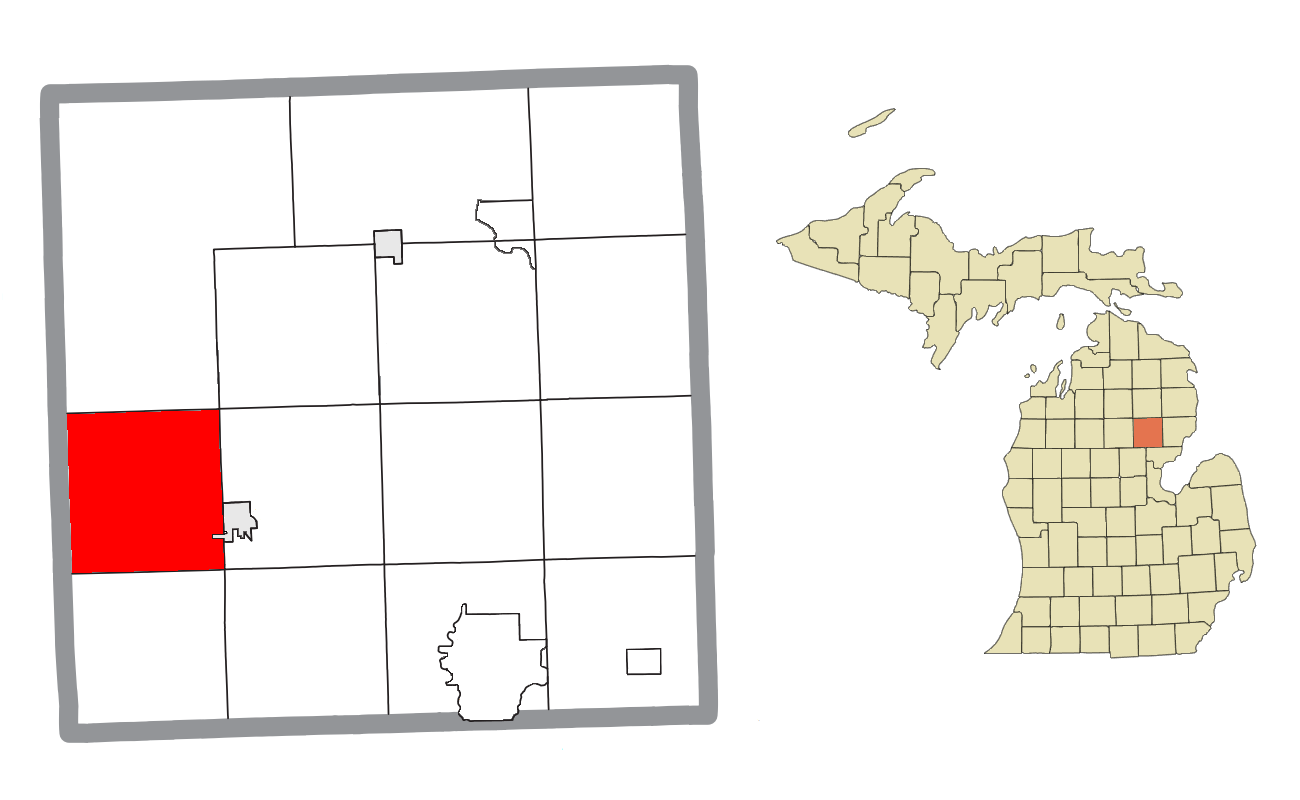
- Location within Ogemaw County

- Location within the state of Michigan Location within the United States
- Coordinates: 44°18′13″N 84°17′15″W
- Country: United States
- State: Michigan
- County: Ogemaw

Government
  - Supervisor: Denis Stephens
  - Clerk: Tracy Turner

Area
  - Total: 36.40 sq mi (94.28 km^{2})
  - Land: 36.30 sq mi (94.02 km^{2})
  - Water: 0.10 sq mi (0.26 km^{2})
- Elevation: 1,230 ft (375 m)

Population (2020)
  - Total: 1,154
  - Density: 31.79/sq mi (12.27/km^{2})
- Time zone: UTC-5 (Eastern (EST))
  - Summer (DST): UTC-4 (EDT)
- ZIP code(s): 48661 (West Branch)
- Area code: 989
- FIPS code: 26-60300
- GNIS feature ID: 1626839
- Website: https://www.ogemawtownship.org/

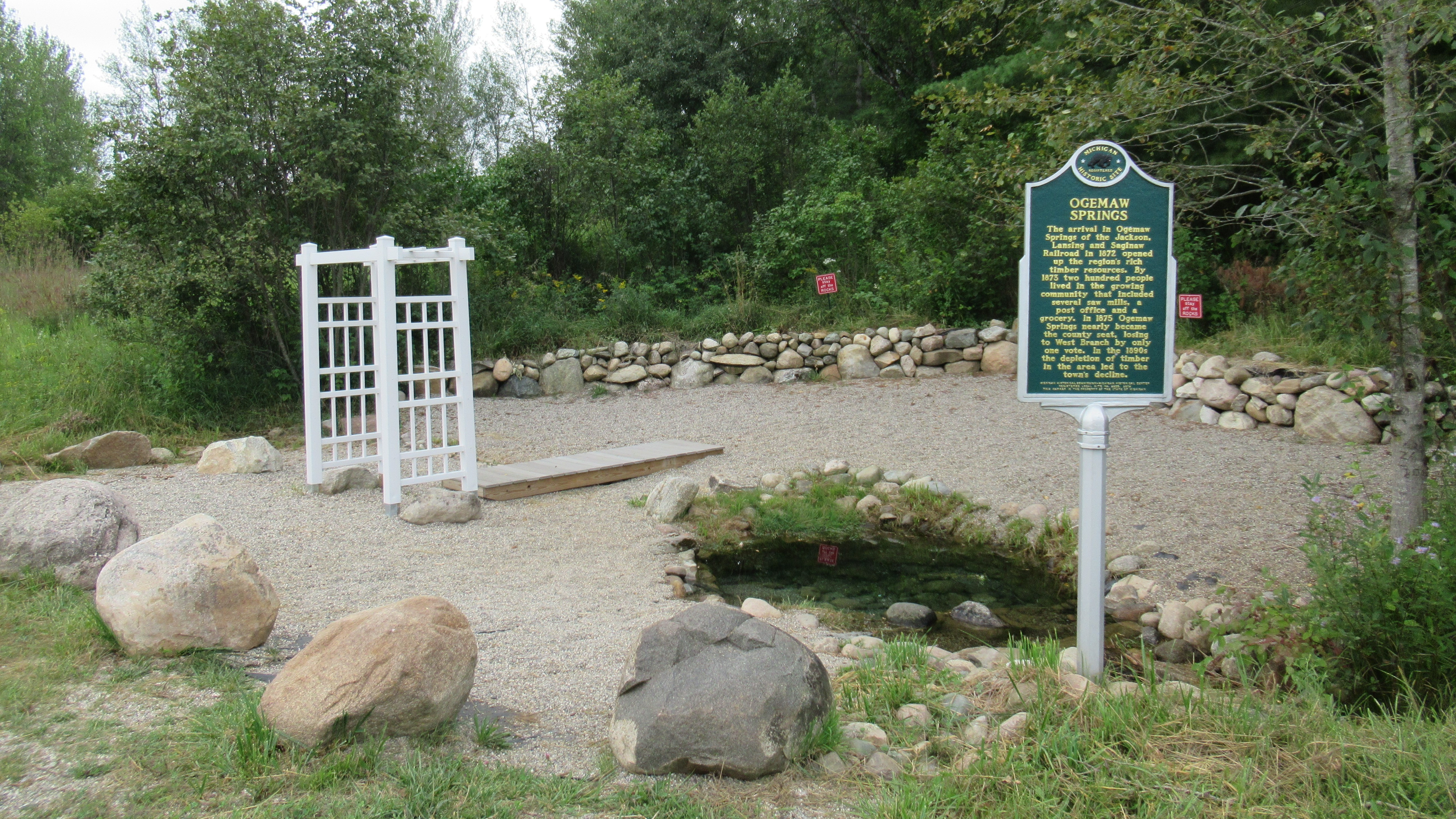
Ogemaw Springs Commemorative Designation

Ogemaw Township (/ˈoʊɡəmɔː/ OH-gə-maw) is a civil township of Ogemaw County in the U.S. state of Michigan. The population was 1,154 at the 2020 census.

== Communities ==
- Ogemaw Springs is an unincorporated community located at 44°18′13″N 84°17′33″W. It contained its own post office from 1873 to 1893. Ogemaw Springs was one of the county's first settlements. It contains a small natural spring and is listed as a Michigan State Historic Site.

== Geography ==
According to the U.S. Census Bureau, the township has a total area of 36.40 square miles (94.28 km^{2}), of which 36.30 square miles (94.02 km^{2}) is land and 0.10 square miles (0.26 km^{2}) (0.27%) is water.

== Demographics ==
As of the census of 2000, there were 1,118 people, 444 households, and 329 families residing in the township. The population density was 30.7 inhabitants per square mile (11.9/km^{2}). There were 559 housing units at an average density of 15.4 units per square mile (5.9 units/km^{2}). The racial makeup of the township was 98.30% White, 0.09% African American, 0.27% Native American, 0.27% Asian, 0.27% Pacific Islander, 0.18% from other races, and 0.63% from two or more races. Hispanic or Latino of any race were 0.54% of the population.

There were 444 households, out of which 31.3% had children under the age of 18 living with them, 65.3% were married couples living together, 5.6% had a female householder with no husband present, and 25.7% were non-families. 20.9% of all households were made up of individuals, and 8.1% had someone living alone who was 65 years of age or older. The average household size was 2.52 and the average family size was 2.91.

In the township the population was spread out, with 24.6% under the age of 18, 6.7% from 18 to 24, 27.3% from 25 to 44, 24.8% from 45 to 64, and 16.6% who were 65 years of age or older. The median age was 40 years. For every 100 females, there were 100.0 males. For every 100 females age 18 and over, there were 98.8 males.

The median income for a household in the township was $41,000, and the median income for a family was $49,167. Males had a median income of $35,543 versus $23,281 for females. The per capita income for the township was $17,785. About 4.3% of families and 7.5% of the population were below the poverty line, including 10.3% of those under age 18 and 7.3% of those age 65 or over.
