= Churchill Township, Michigan =

- Civil township
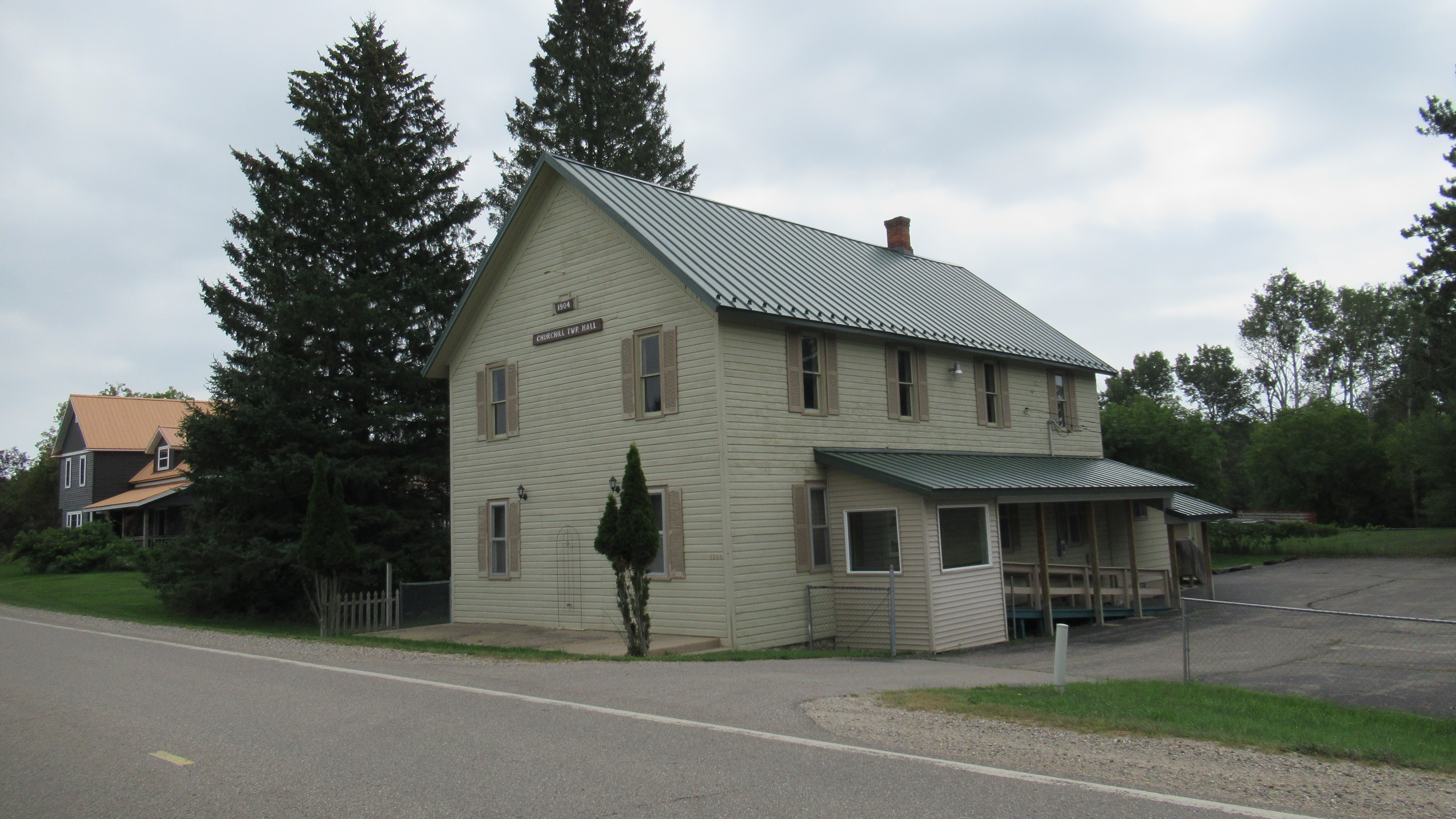
- Churchill Township Hall

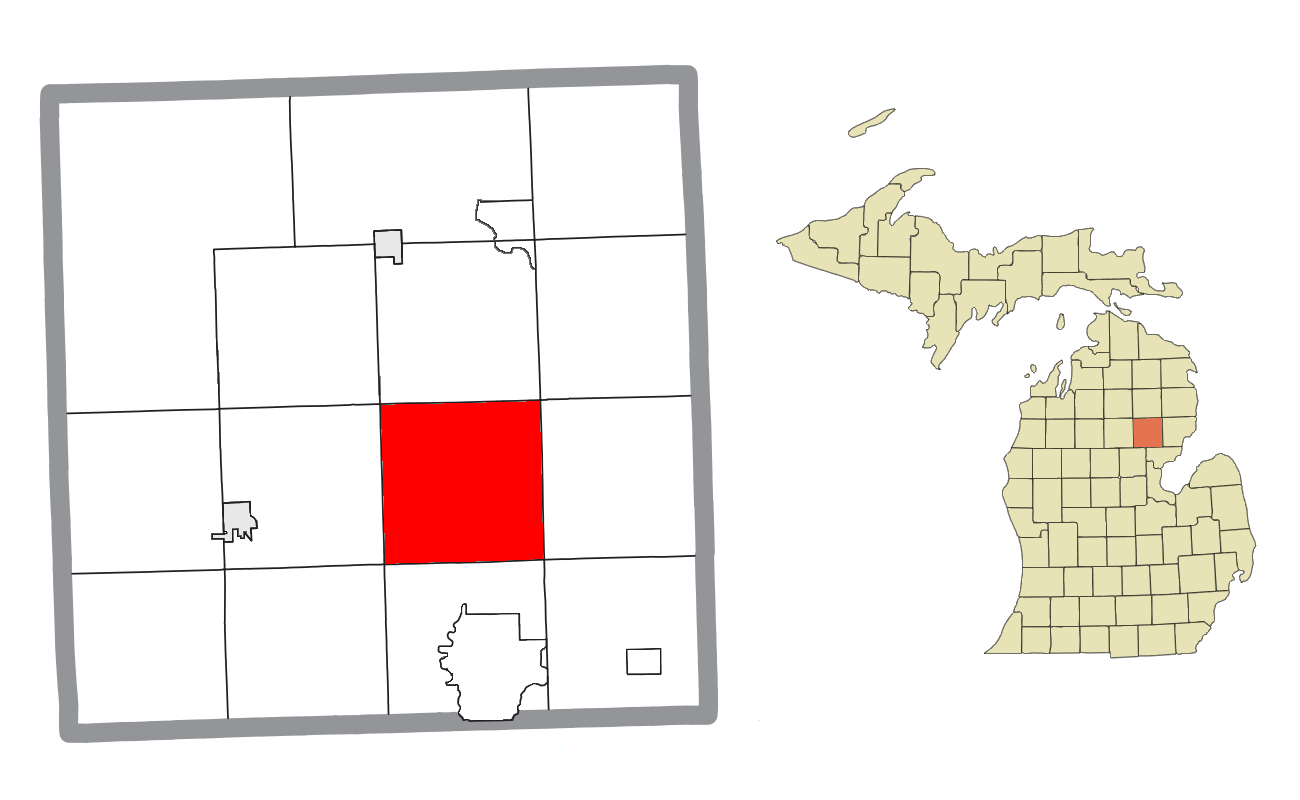
- Location within Ogemaw County

- Location within the state of Michigan Location within the United States
- Coordinates: 44°16′43″N 84°04′21″W
- Country: United States
- State: Michigan
- County: Ogemaw
- Established: 1904

Government
  - Supervisor: Mike Babcock
  - Clerk: Lynn Kavalunas

Area
  - Total: 35.99 sq mi (93.21 km^{2})
  - Land: 35.53 sq mi (92.02 km^{2})
  - Water: 0.46 sq mi (1.19 km^{2})
- Elevation: 850 ft (260 m)

Population (2020)
  - Total: 1,543
  - Density: 43.43/sq mi (16.77/km^{2})
- Time zone: UTC-5 (Eastern (EST))
  - Summer (DST): UTC-4 (EDT)
- ZIP code(s): 48635 (Lupton); 48661 (West Branch); 48756 (Prescott)
- Area code: 989
- FIPS code: 26-15740
- GNIS feature ID: 1626082
- Website: https://churchilltownship.org/

Churchill Township is a civil township of Ogemaw County in the U.S. state of Michigan. The population was 1,543 at the 2020 census.

== Communities ==
- Selkirk is an unincorporated community within the township situated on the Rifle River at 44°18′47″N 84°04′02″W. Selkirk contained its own post office from 1887 to 1955.

== Geography ==
According to the U.S. Census Bureau, the township has a total area of 35.99 square miles (93.21 km^{2}), of which 35.53 square miles (92.02 km^{2}) is land and 0.46 square miles (1.19 km^{2}) (1.28%) is water.

== Demographics ==
As of the census of 2000, there were 1,603 people, 655 households, and 476 families residing in the township. The population density was 45.0 inhabitants per square mile (17.4/km^{2}). There were 1,063 housing units at an average density of 29.8 per square mile (11.5/km^{2}). The racial makeup of the township was 97.26% White, 0.19% African American, 0.62% Native American, 0.19% Asian, 0.06% Pacific Islander, 0.12% from other races, and 1.56% from two or more races. Hispanic or Latino of any race were 0.87% of the population.

There were 655 households, out of which 28.2% had children under the age of 18 living with them, 64.3% were married couples living together, 6.0% had a female householder with no husband present, and 27.3% were non-families. 23.7% of all households were made up of individuals, and 11.3% had someone living alone who was 65 years of age or older. The average household size was 2.44 and the average family size was 2.86.

In the township the population was spread out, with 24.3% under the age of 18, 5.8% from 18 to 24, 24.2% from 25 to 44, 28.8% from 45 to 64, and 16.8% who were 65 years of age or older. The median age was 42 years. For every 100 females, there were 99.1 males. For every 100 females age 18 and over, there were 94.7 males.

The median income for a household in the township was $35,577, and the median income for a family was $39,107. Males had a median income of $30,952 versus $21,382 for females. The per capita income for the township was $17,081. About 7.6% of families and 8.9% of the population were below the poverty line, including 8.7% of those under age 18 and 5.4% of those age 65 or over.
