= Ogemaw County, Michigan =

County in Michigan, United States

- County
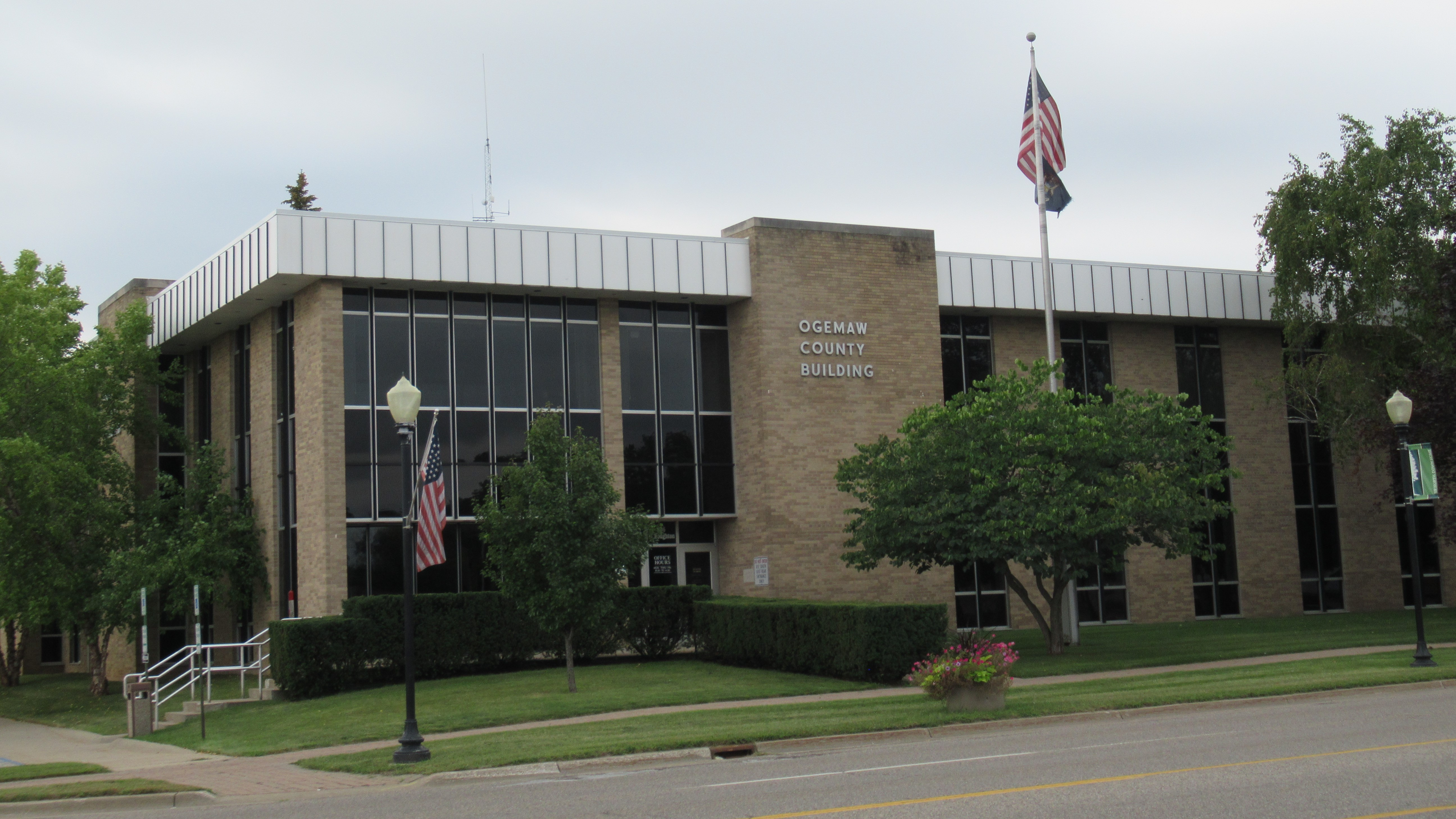
- Ogemaw County Building in West Branch

- Flag

- Location within the U.S. state of Michigan
- Coordinates: 44°20′N 84°08′W
- Country: United States
- State: Michigan
- Authorized: 1840
- Organized: 1875
- Seat: West Branch
- Largest city: Skidway Lake; West Branch (incorporated)

Area
  - Total: 575 sq mi (1,490 km^{2})
  - Land: 563 sq mi (1,460 km^{2})
  - Water: 11 sq mi (28 km^{2}) 2.0%

Population (2020)
  - Total: 20,770
  - Estimate (2025): 21,121 ▲
  - Density: 37.3/sq mi (14.4/km^{2})
- Time zone: UTC−5 (Eastern)
  - Summer (DST): UTC−4 (EDT)
- Congressional district: 1st
- Website: ocmi.us

Ogemaw County (/ˈoʊɡəmɔː/ OH-gə-maw) is a county located in the U.S. state of Michigan. As of the 2020 census, the population was 20,770. The county seat is West Branch. The county newspaper of record is the Ogemaw Herald.

== History ==
Ogemaw County started as part of the Virginia Land owned by England. After the Revolutionary War, it broke up into smaller and smaller pieces. The county was originally created by the Michigan Legislature in 1840 from unorganized territory, but was absorbed into Iosco County in 1867. It was re-created in 1873, and was finally organized in 1875. The county's name is an Anglicization of the Anishinaabemowin word ogimaa, meaning "chief". Ogemaw's name came from an eloquent, respected Native American orator named Little Elk. One of the first settlements in the county was Ogemaw Springs, the genesis of lumbering operations in the county. The settlement of Ogemaw Springs ended when the lumber industry in the region ended. (Due to the lumber industry, railways were built to transport the lumber, and towns often sprang up along the tracks. After timber supplies in the Midwest dwindled, loggers shifted westward to the Pacific Northwest to find new sources of lumber, and many of these fledgling settlements foundered.) With Ogemaw Springs in decline, the people flocked to West Branch, causing an economic boom, including the construction of its first hotel. This created even more growth, causing many restaurants, hotels, and businesses to be built, a vast majority of which still stand today.

== Geography ==
According to the U.S. Census Bureau, the county has a total area of 575 square miles (1,490 km^{2}), of which 563 square miles (1,460 km^{2}) is land and 11 square miles (28 km^{2}) (2.0%) is water. Ogemaw County is considered to be part of Northern Michigan.

=== Highways ===
- I-75 – Runs SE across the southwest part of the county; passes south of West Branch.
- M-30 – Enters from Gladwin County at 5.5 miles (8.9 km) east of the SW corner of Ogemaw County; runs north and NE to intersection with M-55 near West Branch.
- M-33 – Runs north–south through the middle of county; passes Rose City.
- M-55 – Runs east–west across the lower part of county; enters from Iosco County at 6 miles (9.7 km) north of SE corner of Ogemaw County; runs west to intersection with I-75, west of West Branch.

=== Adjacent counties ===
- Oscoda County - north
- Alcona County - northeast
- Iosco County - east
- Arenac County - southeast
- Gladwin County - southwest
- Roscommon County - west
- Crawford County - northwest

=== National protected area ===
- Huron National Forest (part)

=== State protected area ===
- Au Sable State Forest (part)
- Rifle River State Recreation Area

== Communities ==
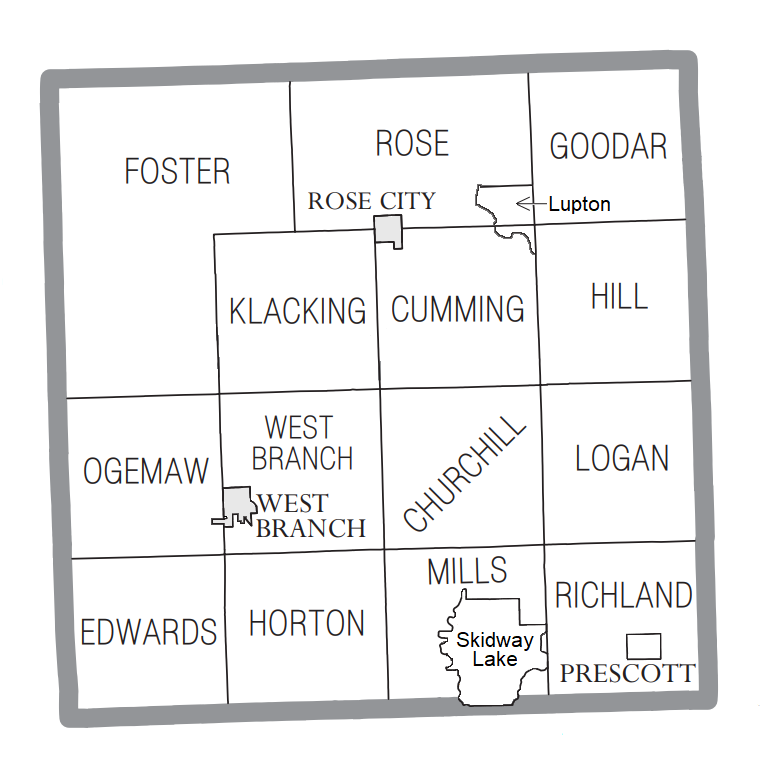
U.S. Census data map showing local municipal boundaries within Ogemaw County, as well as two CDP boundaries. Shaded areas represent incorporated cities.

=== Cities ===
- Rose City
- West Branch (county seat)

=== Village ===
- Prescott

=== Civil townships ===
- Churchill Township
- Cumming Township
- Edwards Township
- Foster Township
- Goodar Township
- Hill Township
- Horton Township
- Klacking Township
- Logan Township
- Mills Township
- Ogemaw Township
- Richland Township
- Rose Township
- West Branch Township

=== Census-designated places ===
- Lupton
- Skidway Lake

=== Other unincorporated communities ===
- Camp Lu Lay Lea
- Campbells Corners
- Damon
- Edwards
- Elbow Lake
- Fayettes Corner
- Goodar
- Greenwood
- Ogemaw Springs
- Selkirk
- Shady Shores
- South Branch

== Demographics ==
Historical population
Census	Pop.	Note	%±
1870	12		—
1880	1,914		15,850.0%
1890	5,583		191.7%
1900	7,765		39.1%
1910	8,907		14.7%
1920	7,786		−12.6%
1930	6,595		−15.3%
1940	8,720		32.2%
1950	9,345		7.2%
1960	9,680		3.6%
1970	11,903		23.0%
1980	16,436		38.1%
1990	18,681		13.7%
2000	21,645		15.9%
2010	21,699		0.2%
2020	20,770		−4.3%
2025 (est.)	21,121	▲	1.7%
US Decennial Census; 1790-1960 1900-1990; 1990-2000 2010-2020

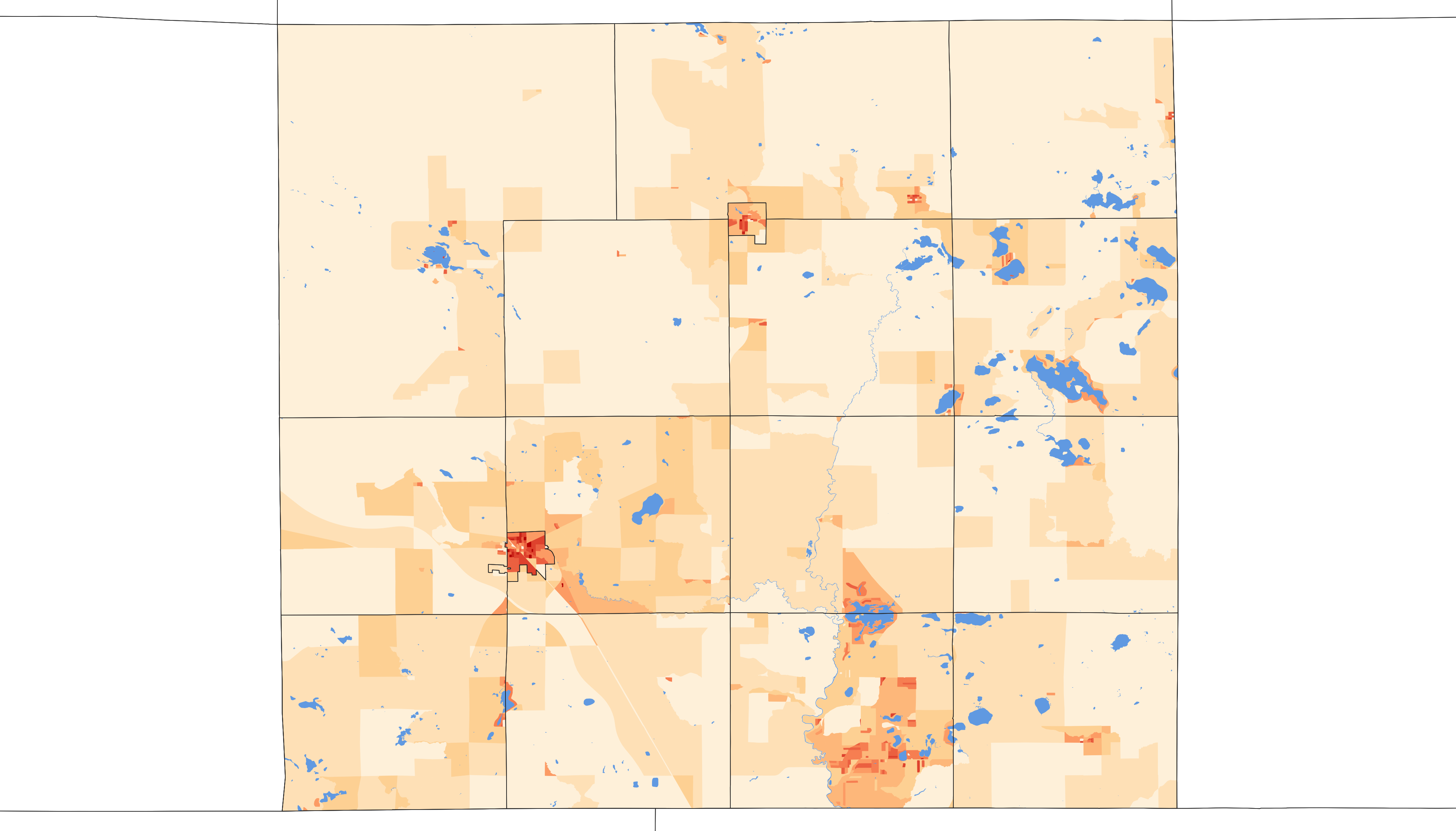
2020 population density of Ogemaw County MI by census block

=== Racial and ethnic composition ===
Ogemaw County, Michigan – Racial and ethnic composition Note: the US Census treats Hispanic/Latino as an ethnic category. This table excludes Latinos from the racial categories and assigns them to a separate category. Hispanics/Latinos may be of any race.
Race / Ethnicity (NH = Non-Hispanic)	Pop 1980	Pop 1990	Pop 2000	Pop 2010	Pop 2020	% 1980	% 1990	% 2000	% 2010	% 2020
White alone (NH)	16,288	18,405	20,906	20,865	19,268	99.10%	98.52%	96.59%	96.16%	92.77%
Black or African American alone (NH)	9	18	28	37	59	0.05%	0.10%	0.13%	0.17%	0.28%
Native American or Alaska Native alone (NH)	63	134	121	147	108	0.38%	0.72%	0.56%	0.68%	0.52%
Asian alone (NH)	16	17	81	76	57	0.10%	0.09%	0.37%	0.35%	0.27%
Native Hawaiian or Pacific Islander alone (NH)	x	x	7	6	8	x	x	0.03%	0.03%	0.04%
Other race alone (NH)	7	3	3	8	58	0.04%	0.02%	0.01%	0.04%	0.28%
Mixed race or Multiracial (NH)	x	x	247	251	775	x	x	1.14%	1.16%	3.73%
Hispanic or Latino (any race)	53	104	252	309	437	0.32%	0.56%	1.16%	1.42%	2.10%
Total	16,436	18,681	21,645	21,699	20,770	100.00%	100.00%	100.00%	100.00%	100.00%

=== 2020 census ===
As of the 2020 census, the county had a population of 20,770. The median age was 50.6 years. 18.6% of residents were under the age of 18 and 26.4% of residents were 65 years of age or older. For every 100 females there were 100.3 males, and for every 100 females age 18 and over there were 100.4 males age 18 and over.

The racial makeup of the county was 93.9% White, 0.3% Black or African American, 0.6% American Indian and Alaska Native, 0.3% Asian, <0.1% Native Hawaiian and Pacific Islander, 0.6% from some other race, and 4.3% from two or more races. Hispanic or Latino residents of any race comprised 2.1% of the population.

<0.1% of residents lived in urban areas, while 100.0% lived in rural areas.

There were 9,207 households in the county, of which 21.3% had children under the age of 18 living in them. Of all households, 46.6% were married-couple households, 22.0% were households with a male householder and no spouse or partner present, and 24.4% were households with a female householder and no spouse or partner present. About 32.5% of all households were made up of individuals and 16.9% had someone living alone who was 65 years of age or older.

There were 15,246 housing units, of which 39.6% were vacant. Among occupied housing units, 80.5% were owner-occupied and 19.5% were renter-occupied. The homeowner vacancy rate was 2.5% and the rental vacancy rate was 5.6%.

=== 2000 census ===
As of the 2000 United States census, there were 21,645 people, 8,842 households, and 6,189 families residing in the county.

== Government ==
For many years, Ogemaw County has been reliably Republican. Since 1884, the Republican Party nominee has carried the county vote in 75% of the national presidential elections (27 of 36).

United States presidential election results for Ogemaw County, Michigan
Year	Republican		Democratic		Third party(ies)	
Year	No.	%	No.	%	No.	%
1884	478	49.48%	472	48.86%	16	1.66%
1888	620	48.44%	579	45.23%	81	6.33%
1892	594	50.64%	514	43.82%	65	5.54%
1896	793	56.64%	560	40.00%	47	3.36%
1900	1,186	67.31%	518	29.40%	58	3.29%
1904	1,320	75.47%	329	18.81%	100	5.72%
1908	1,218	68.47%	454	25.52%	107	6.01%
1912	541	31.64%	319	18.65%	850	49.71%
1916	878	51.20%	743	43.32%	94	5.48%
1920	1,687	75.55%	444	19.88%	102	4.57%
1924	1,714	79.32%	258	11.94%	189	8.75%
1928	1,630	73.39%	579	26.07%	12	0.54%
1932	1,472	45.94%	1,645	51.34%	87	2.72%
1936	1,631	45.24%	1,774	49.21%	200	5.55%
1940	2,447	65.45%	1,278	34.18%	14	0.37%
1944	2,339	69.55%	1,006	29.91%	18	0.54%
1948	2,062	64.70%	1,038	32.57%	87	2.73%
1952	2,983	73.91%	1,030	25.52%	23	0.57%
1956	2,931	69.18%	1,300	30.68%	6	0.14%
1960	2,664	58.65%	1,867	41.11%	11	0.24%
1964	1,609	36.36%	2,812	63.55%	4	0.09%
1968	2,526	54.56%	1,647	35.57%	457	9.87%
1972	3,367	60.77%	2,056	37.11%	118	2.13%
1976	3,212	47.07%	3,545	51.95%	67	0.98%
1980	4,169	51.29%	3,426	42.15%	533	6.56%
1984	4,901	60.81%	3,132	38.86%	27	0.33%
1988	4,091	50.20%	4,012	49.23%	47	0.58%
1992	2,936	32.17%	4,016	44.01%	2,174	23.82%
1996	2,904	32.04%	4,725	52.13%	1,435	15.83%
2000	4,706	47.75%	4,896	49.68%	253	2.57%
2004	5,454	50.52%	5,215	48.30%	127	1.18%
2008	5,133	47.54%	5,391	49.93%	274	2.54%
2012	5,437	52.31%	4,791	46.09%	166	1.60%
2016	6,827	65.39%	3,030	29.02%	583	5.58%
2020	8,253	69.23%	3,475	29.15%	193	1.62%
2024	8,879	70.35%	3,578	28.35%	165	1.31%

United States Senate election results for Ogemaw County, Michigan1
Year	Republican		Democratic		Third party(ies)	
Year	No.	%	No.	%	No.	%
2024	8,312	67.52%	3,684	29.92%	315	2.56%

Michigan Gubernatorial election results for Ogemaw County
Year	Republican		Democratic		Third party(ies)	
Year	No.	%	No.	%	No.	%
2022	6,151	62.18%	3,532	35.71%	209	2.11%

Ogemaw County operates the County jail, maintains rural roads, operates the major local courts, records deeds, mortgages, and vital records, administers public health regulations, and participates with the state in the provision of social services. The county board of commissioners controls the budget and has limited authority to make laws or ordinances. In Michigan, most local government functions – police and fire, building and zoning, tax assessment, street maintenance etc. – are the responsibility of individual cities and townships.

=== Elected officials ===
- Prosecuting Attorney – LaDonna A. Schultz
- Sheriff – Brian D. Gilbert
- County Clerk – Breck Gildner
- County Treasurer – Caren Piglowski
- Register of Deeds – Denise Simmons
- Drain Commissioner – Michael DeMatio
- Commissioner Dist. 1 – Craig Scott
- Commissioner Dist. 2 – Mark Surbrook
- Commissioner Dist. 3 – Ronald Vaughn
- Commissioner Dist. 4 – Brad Neubecker
- Commissioner Dist. 5 – Jenny David

(information as of February 2021)

== See also ==
- List of Michigan State Historic Sites in Ogemaw County, Michigan
- National Register of Historic Places listings in Ogemaw County, Michigan
