= Horton Township, Michigan =

- Civil township
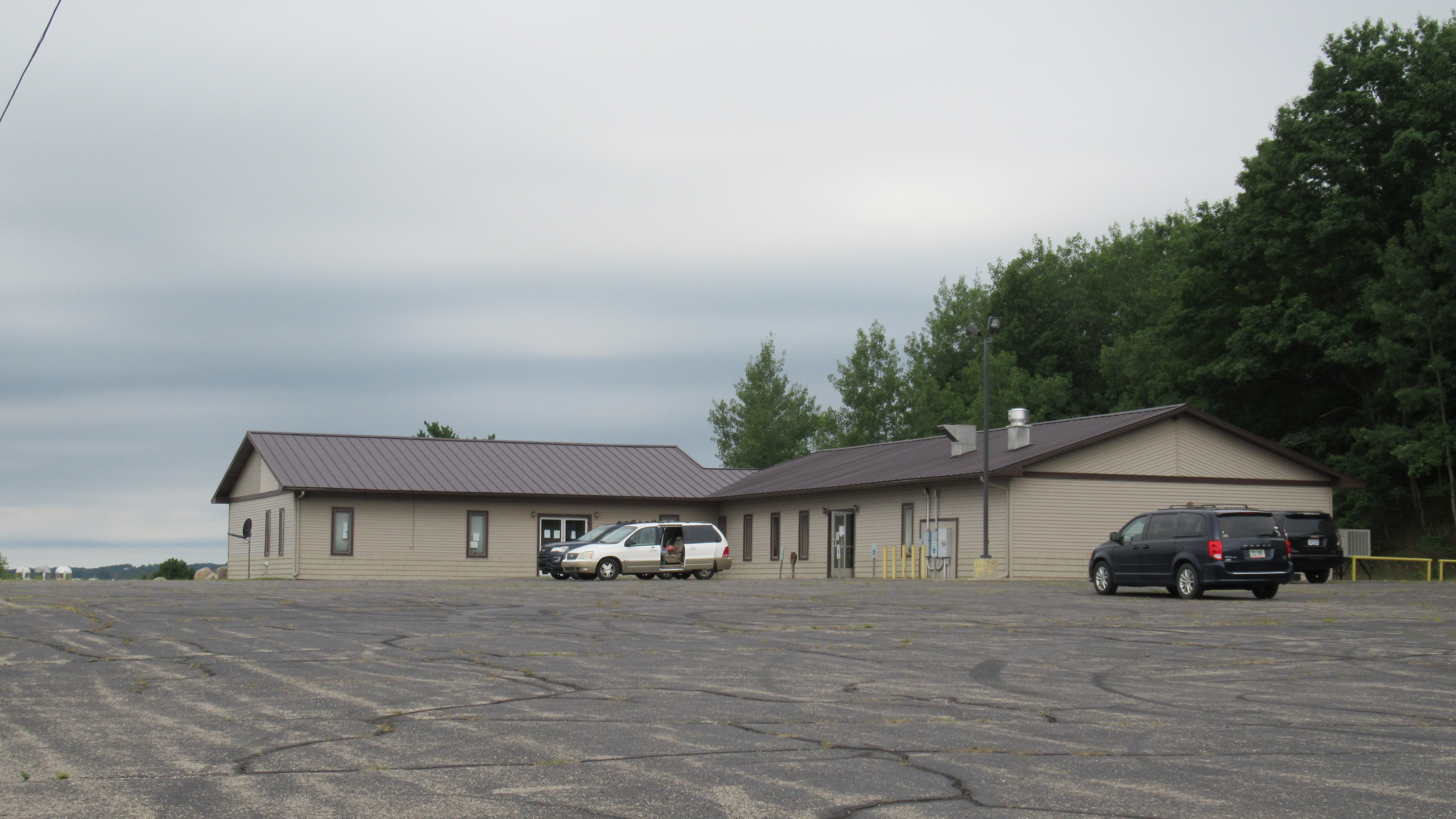
- Horton Township Hall

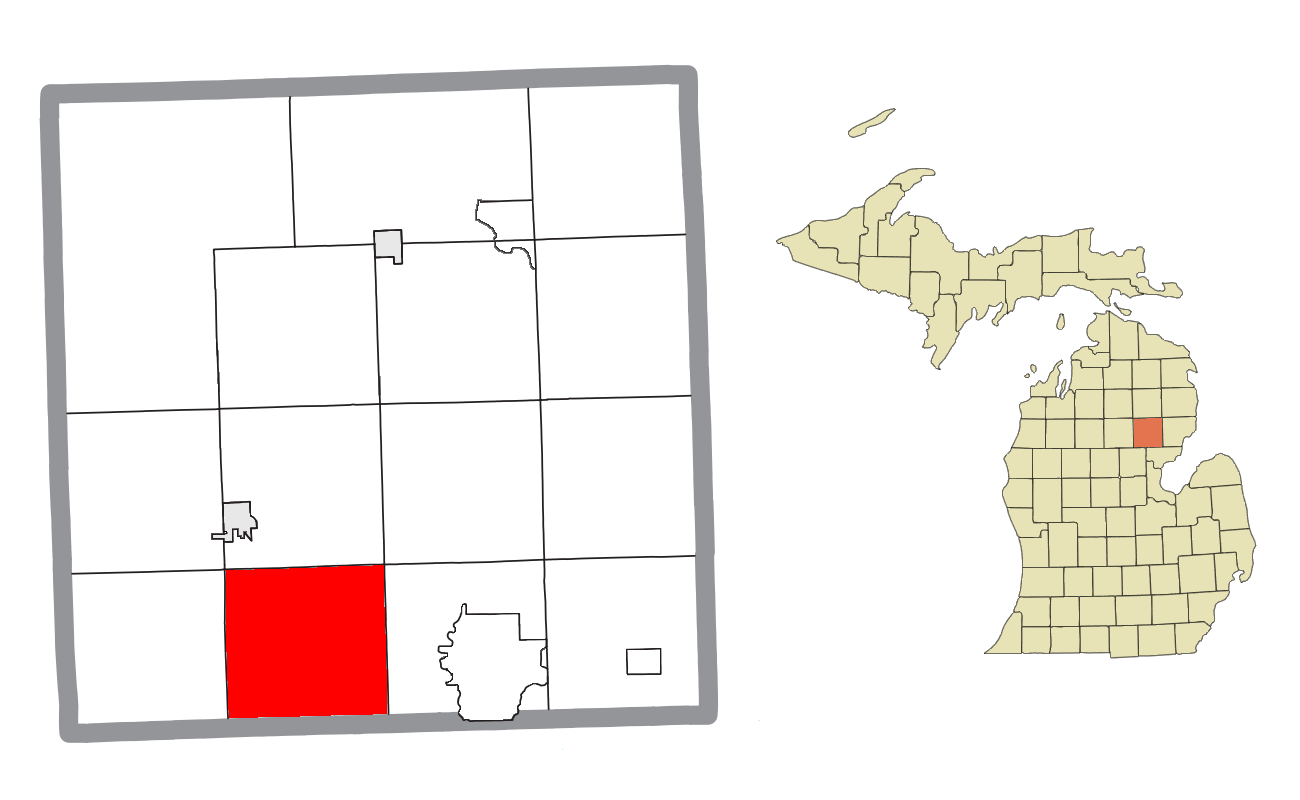
- Location within Ogemaw County

- Location within the state of Michigan Location within the United States
- Coordinates: 44°12′23″N 84°11′31″W
- Country: United States
- State: Michigan
- County: Ogemaw

Government
  - Supervisor: Karen Michael
  - Clerk: Karen Howard

Area
  - Total: 35.75 sq mi (92.59 km^{2})
  - Land: 35.46 sq mi (91.84 km^{2})
  - Water: 0.29 sq mi (0.75 km^{2})
- Elevation: 850 ft (259 m)

Population (2020)
  - Total: 902
  - Density: 25.4/sq mi (9.82/km^{2})
- Time zone: UTC-5 (Eastern (EST))
  - Summer (DST): UTC-4 (EDT)
- ZIP code(s): 48610 (Alger); 48661 (West Branch)
- Area code: 989
- FIPS code: 26-39320
- GNIS feature ID: 1626491

Horton Township is a civil township of Ogemaw County in the U.S. state of Michigan. The population was 902 at the 2020 census.

== Communities ==
- Greenwood is an unincorporated community in the southeast part of the township at 44°10′34″N 84°09′24″W. From 1870 until 1895, approximately 2,000 men were employed seasonally in nearly 50 lumber camps in the area. A post office was established in January 1873. It was a station on the Mackinaw division of the Michigan Central Railroad by 1878. The post office closed in February 1901.

== Geography ==
According to the U.S. Census Bureau, the township has a total area of 35.75 square miles (92.59 km^{2}), of which 35.46 square miles (91.84 km^{2}) is land and 0.29 square miles (0.75 km^{2}) (0.81%) is water.

== Demographics ==
As of the census of 2000, there were 997 people, 398 households, and 278 families residing in the township. The population density was 28.1 inhabitants per square mile (10.8/km^{2}). There were 570 housing units at an average density of 16.1 per square mile (6.2/km^{2}). The racial makeup of the township was 98.19% White, 0.10% African American, 0.30% Native American, 0.70% Asian, and 0.70% from two or more races. Hispanic or Latino of any race were 1.71% of the population.

There were 398 households, out of which 32.9% had children under the age of 18 living with them, 58.3% were married couples living together, 8.0% had a female householder with no husband present, and 29.9% were non-families. 24.4% of all households were made up of individuals, and 8.0% had someone living alone who was 65 years of age or older. The average household size was 2.51 and the average family size was 2.96.

In the township the population was spread out, with 26.2% under the age of 18, 5.9% from 18 to 24, 28.5% from 25 to 44, 26.5% from 45 to 64, and 12.9% who were 65 years of age or older. The median age was 39 years. For every 100 females, there were 104.3 males. For every 100 females age 18 and over, there were 100.5 males.

The median income for a household in the township was $33,816, and the median income for a family was $40,688. Males had a median income of $31,417 versus $19,479 for females. The per capita income for the township was $16,230. About 9.0% of families and 8.8% of the population were below the poverty line, including 6.4% of those under age 18 and 10.6% of those age 65 or over.
