= West Branch Township, Ogemaw County, Michigan =

West Branch Township, Michigan
- Civil township
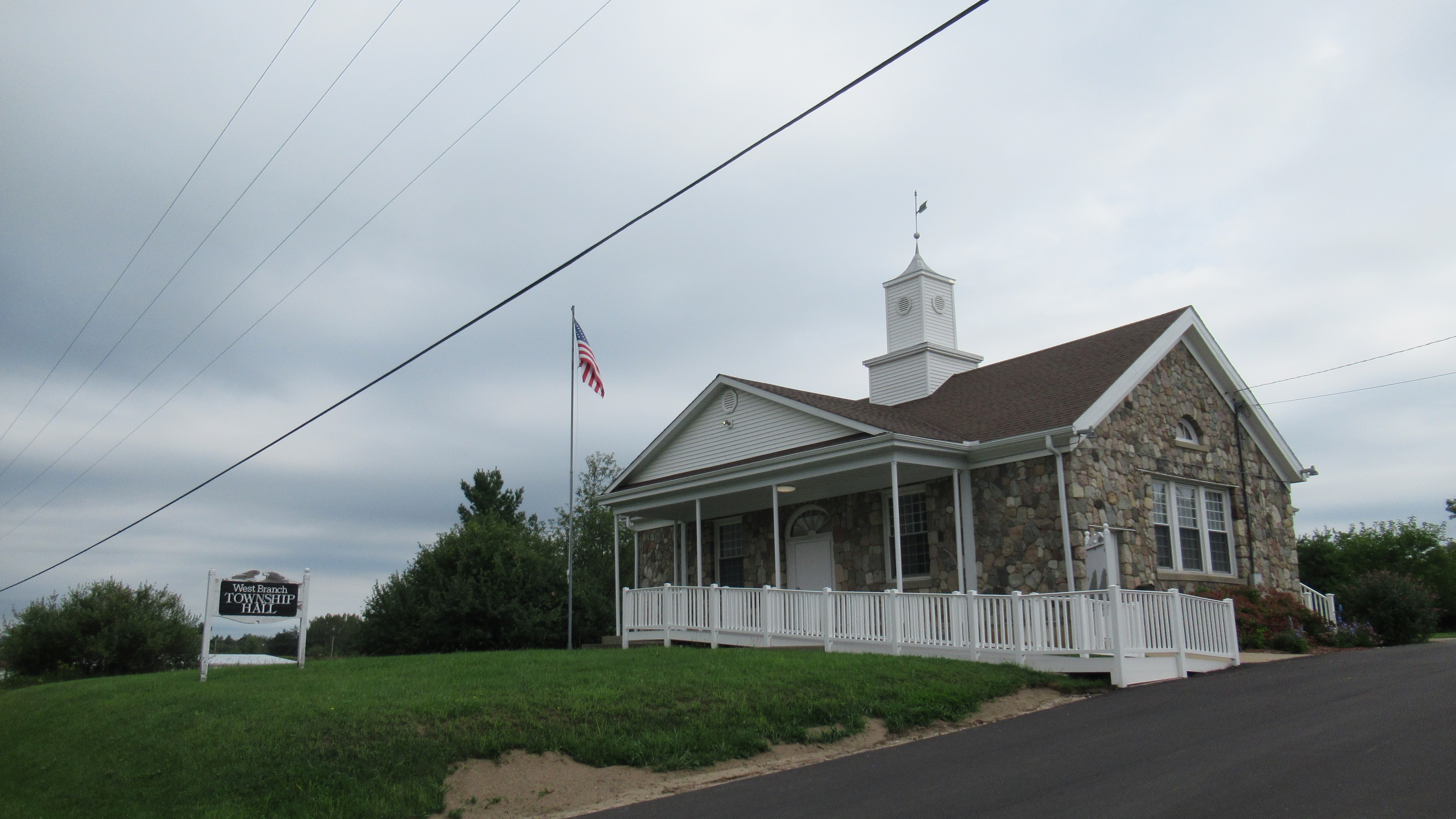
- West Branch Township Hall
- Motto: "Where the Farm Meets the City"
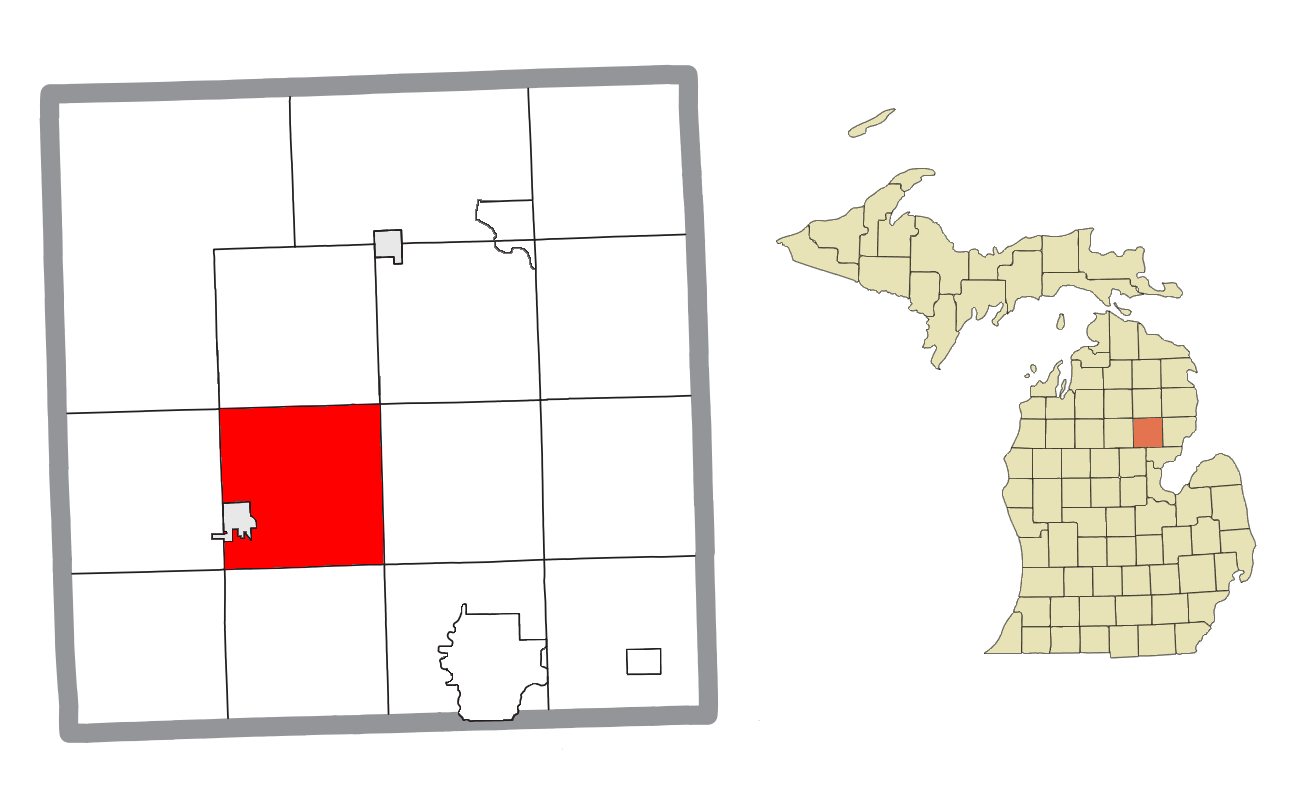
- Location within Ogemaw County

- Location within the state of Michigan Location within the United States
- Coordinates: 44°17′17″N 84°12′11″W
- Country: United States
- State: Michigan
- County: Ogemaw

Government
  - Supervisor: Jim Morris
  - Clerk: Jeremy Hickmott

Area
  - Total: 34.59 sq mi (89.59 km^{2})
  - Land: 34.02 sq mi (88.11 km^{2})
  - Water: 0.57 sq mi (1.48 km^{2})
- Elevation: 978 ft (298 m)

Population (2020)
  - Total: 2,567
  - Density: 75.46/sq mi (29.13/km^{2})
- Time zone: UTC-5 (Eastern (EST))
  - Summer (DST): UTC-4 (EDT)
- ZIP code(s): 48661 (West Branch)
- Area code: 989
- FIPS code: 26-85600
- GNIS feature ID: 1627249
- Website: Official website

West Branch Township is a civil township of Ogemaw County in the U.S. state of Michigan. The population was 2,567 at the 2020 census. The city of West Branch is mostly surrounded by the township, but the two are administered autonomously.

== Communities ==
- Campbells Corner is an unincorporated community located at 44°18′47″N 84°08′44″W in the northeast portion of the township. The community contained its own post office from 1877–1911.

== Geography ==
According to the U.S. Census Bureau, the township has a total area of 34.59 square miles (89.59 km^{2}), of which 34.02 square miles (88.11 km^{2}) is land and 0.57 square miles (1.48 km^{2}) (1.65%) is water.

== Demographics ==
At the 2000 census, there were 2,628 people, 978 households and 730 families residing in the township. The population density was 76.9 per square mile (29.7/km^{2}). There were 1,177 housing units at an average density of 34.4 per square mile (13.3/km^{2}). The racial make-up of the township was 98.48% White, 0.15% African American, 0.23% Native American, 0.15% Asian, 0.08% from other races and 0.91% from two or more races. Hispanic or Latino of any race were 0.80% of the population.

There were 978 households, of which 32.5% had children under the age of 18 living with them, 62.8% were married couples living together, 7.7% had a female householder with no husband present and 25.3% were non-families. 22.1% of all households were made up of individuals, and 9.7% had someone living alone who was 65 years of age or older. The average household size was 2.59 and the average family size was 3.01.

26.2% of the population were under the age of 18, 6.3% from 18 to 24, 25.3% from 25 to 44, 24.3% from 45 to 64 and 17.8% were 65 years of age or older. The median age was 40 years. For every 100 females, there were 95.2 males. For every 100 females age 18 and over, there were 91.0 males.

The median household income was $38,182 and the median family income was $41,458. Males had a median income of $35,919 vand females $20,313. The per capita income was $17,503. About 7.7% of families and 9.6% of the population were below the poverty line, including 15.1% of those under age 18 and 5.5% of those age 65 or over.
