= Rose City, Michigan =

- City
- City of Rose City
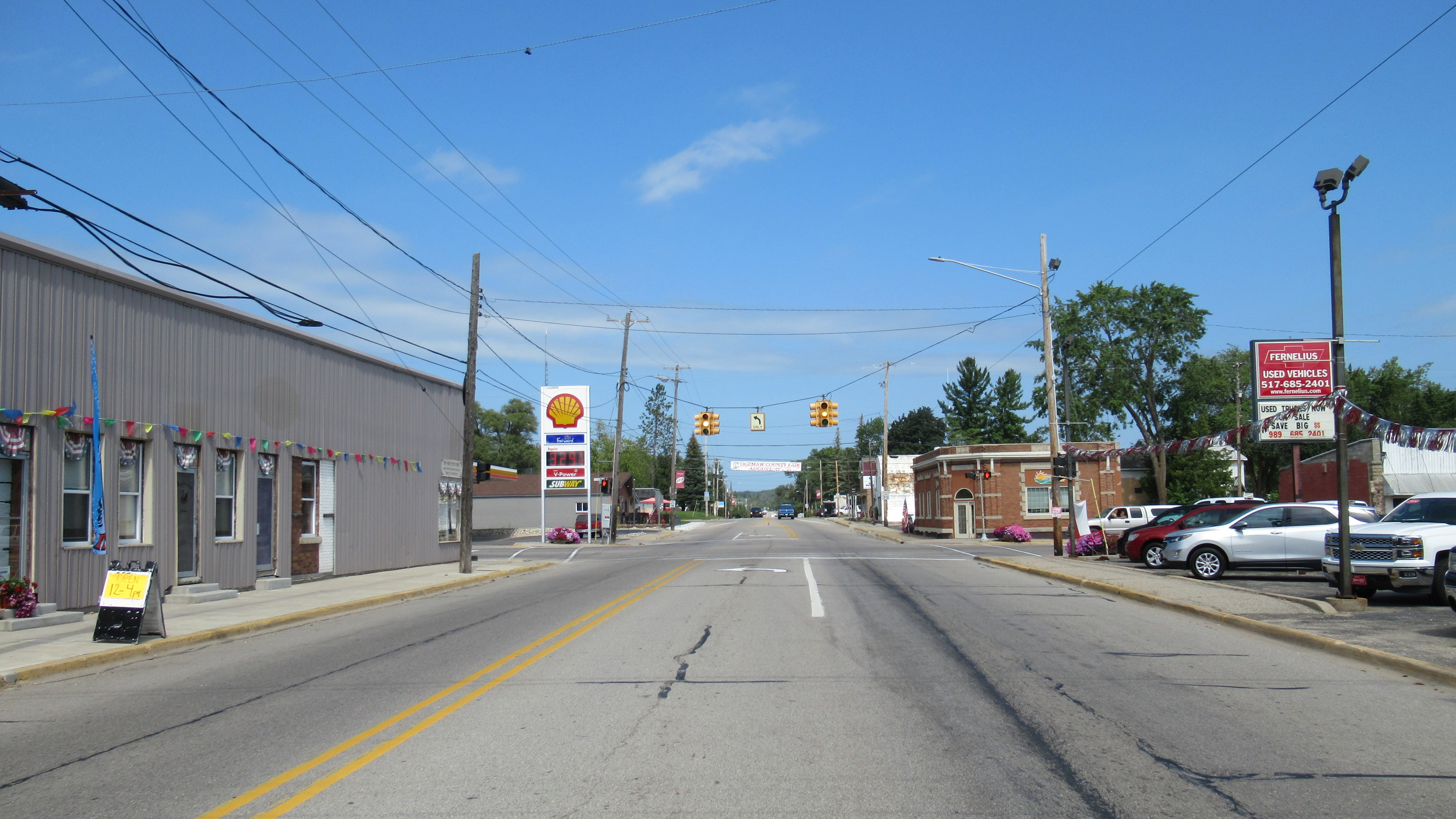
- Looking north along M-33 toward Main Street

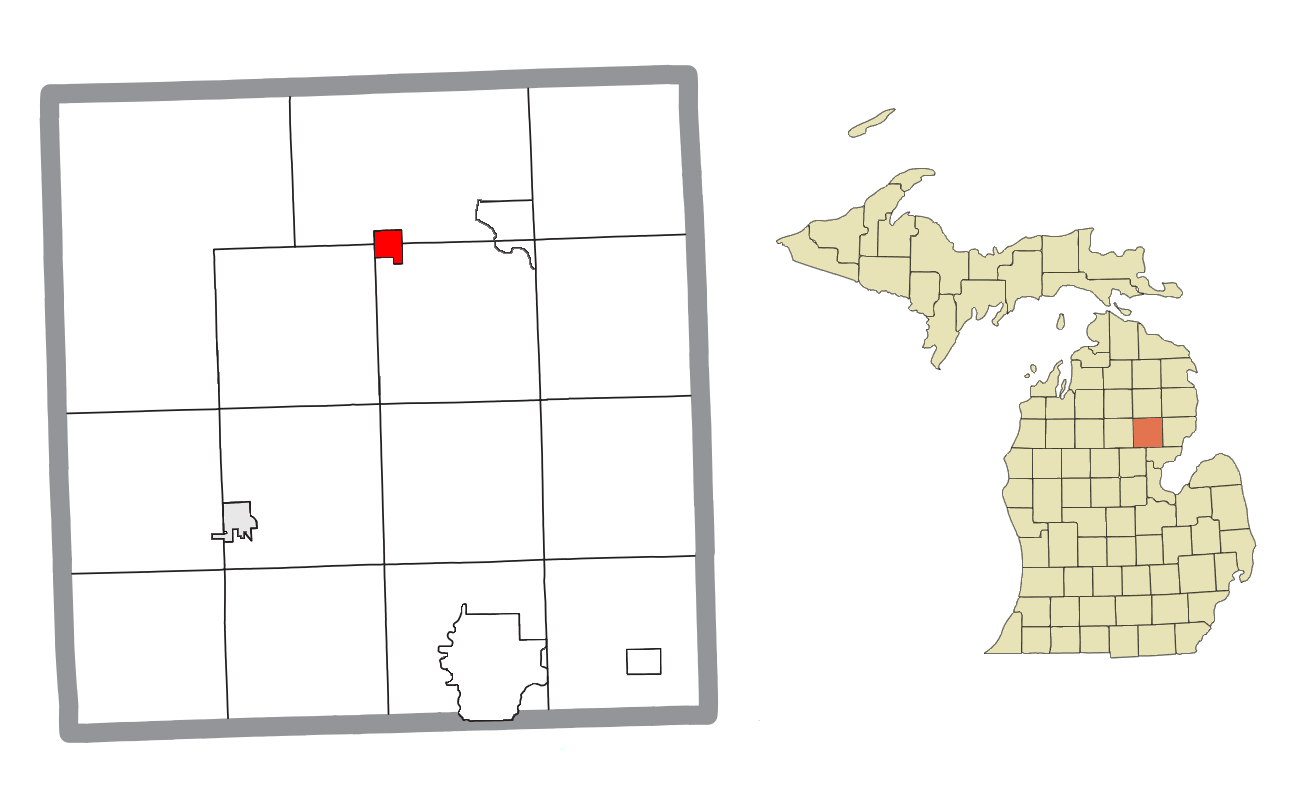
- Location within Ogemaw County

- Location within the state of Michigan Location within the United States
- Coordinates: 44°25′16″N 84°06′55″W
- Country: United States
- State: Michigan
- County: Ogemaw
- Settled: 1875
- Incorporated: 1910

Government
  - Type: Mayor–council
  - Mayor: Dave Reasner
  - Clerk: Cindy Rosebrugh

Area
  - Total: 1.08 sq mi (2.81 km^{2})
  - Land: 1.08 sq mi (2.79 km^{2})
  - Water: 0.0077 sq mi (0.02 km^{2})
- Elevation: 958 ft (292 m)

Population (2020)
  - Total: 577
  - Density: 536/sq mi (206.9/km^{2})
- Time zone: UTC-5 (Eastern (EST))
  - Summer (DST): UTC-4 (EDT)
- ZIP code(s): 48654
- Area code: 989
- FIPS code: 26-69680
- GNIS feature ID: 636193
- Website: Official website

Rose City is a city in Ogemaw County in the U.S. state of Michigan. As of the 2020 census, Rose City had a population of 577.

== History ==
Churchill was the original name of this lumbering town, which was located 0.5 miles (0.8 km) from its present location. Hiram Hodge was the first resident of the community. He built a hotel, but later left the area. The Rose family, including Allan S. Rose, his father and two brothers, came from New York State in 1875. Allan S. Rose formed a partnership with M.H. French, known as the "French and Rose Land Company", and started a new settlement. The many lumber operations were after the giant pine and old timber found in the area. They cleared land and built a general store, settler's cabins, and boarding houses. A post office opened with the name Churchill on September 8, 1875.

On July 23, 1892, the settlement was moved to the east, and the post office's name was changed to Rose City, in honor of the Rose family. Rose City was incorporated as a fourth-class city in 1905. In 1910, the city suffered a major fire that destroyed the business section within an hour, with thirty buildings burning down. This fire caused the end of Rose City's lumbering center, as many businesses decided not to rebuild.

The area began to see several improvements from 1945 to 1960, including the construction of a sewer system, paved streets, and streetlights. There are many artesian wells found in Rose City's main water supply still today, and Rose City was once referred to as "The Home of Artesian Wells". In October 1962, Rose City's school district was combined with that of neighboring West Branch to become the West Branch-Rose City Area Schools district.

In 2002, the city of Rose City and the site of its historic fire were designated as Michigan State Historic Sites, with a double-sided historic marker erected in Rose City Park. Near Rose City Park is the Cleveland Park Pavilion, which is also a registered historic site.

== Geography ==
According to the United States Census Bureau, the city has a total area of 1.09 square miles (2.82 km^{2}), of which 1.08 square miles (2.80 km^{2}) is land and 0.01 square miles (0.03 km^{2}) (0.74%) is water.

Houghton Creek, a tributary of the Rifle River, runs through part of the city limits. The Rifle River State Recreation Area, which can be used for year-round activities like canoeing, swimming, fishing, and snowmobiling, is about 3 miles (4.8 km) to the east. There are 75 lakes within 15 miles of the city limits.

== Demographics ==
Historical population
Census	Pop.	Note	%±
1910	542		—
1920	331		−38.9%
1930	338		2.1%
1940	355		5.0%
1950	446		25.6%
1960	435		−2.5%
1970	530		21.8%
1980	661		24.7%
1990	686		3.8%
2000	721		5.1%
2010	653		−9.4%
2020	577		−11.6%
U.S. Decennial Census

=== 2010 census ===
At the 2010 census there were 653 people in 238 households, including 154 families, in the city. The population density was 604.6 inhabitants per square mile (233.4/km^{2}). There were 288 housing units at an average density of 266.7 per square mile (103.0/km^{2}). The racial makeup of the city was 96.9% White, 0.2% African American, 1.2% Native American, 0.3% Asian, 0.5% from other races, and 0.9% from two or more races. Hispanic or Latino of any race were 1.7%.

Of the 238 households 35.7% had children under the age of 18 living with them, 36.1% were married couples living together, 21.4% had a female householder with no husband present, 7.1% had a male householder with no wife present, and 35.3% were non-families. 30.7% of households were one person and 14.3% were one person aged 65 or older. The average household size was 2.36 and the average family size was 2.87.

The median age was 44.6 years. 23.3% of residents were under the age of 18; 7.4% were between the ages of 18 and 24; 19.6% were from 25 to 44; 25% were from 45 to 64; and 24.8% were 65 or older. The gender makeup of the city was 48.4% male and 51.6% female.

=== 2000 census ===
At the 2000 census there were 721 people in 241 households, including 155 families, in the city. The population density was 665.7 inhabitants per square mile (257.0/km^{2}). There were 283 housing units at an average density of 261.3 per square mile (100.9/km^{2}). The racial makeup of the city was 96.26% White, 0.14% African American, 0.83% Native American, 0.97% from other races, and 1.80% from two or more races. Hispanic or Latino of any race were 1.39%.

Of the 241 households 35.3% had children under the age of 18 living with them, 40.7% were married couples living together, 21.2% had a female householder with no husband present, and 35.3% were non-families. 30.7% of households were one person and 13.3% were one person aged 65 or older. The average household size was 2.51 and the average family size was 3.16.

The age distribution was 26.4% under the age of 18, 6.8% from 18 to 24, 23.3% from 25 to 44, 17.2% from 45 to 64, and 26.4% 65 or older. The median age was 39 years. For every 100 females, there were 82.1 males. For every 100 females age 18 and over, there were 75.2 males.

The median household income was $25,192 and the median family income was $31,042. Males had a median income of $24,861 versus $18,417 for females. The per capita income for the city was $10,684. About 18.3% of families and 24.7% of the population were below the poverty line, including 33.5% of those under age 18 and 3.1% of those age 65 or over.

== Images ==
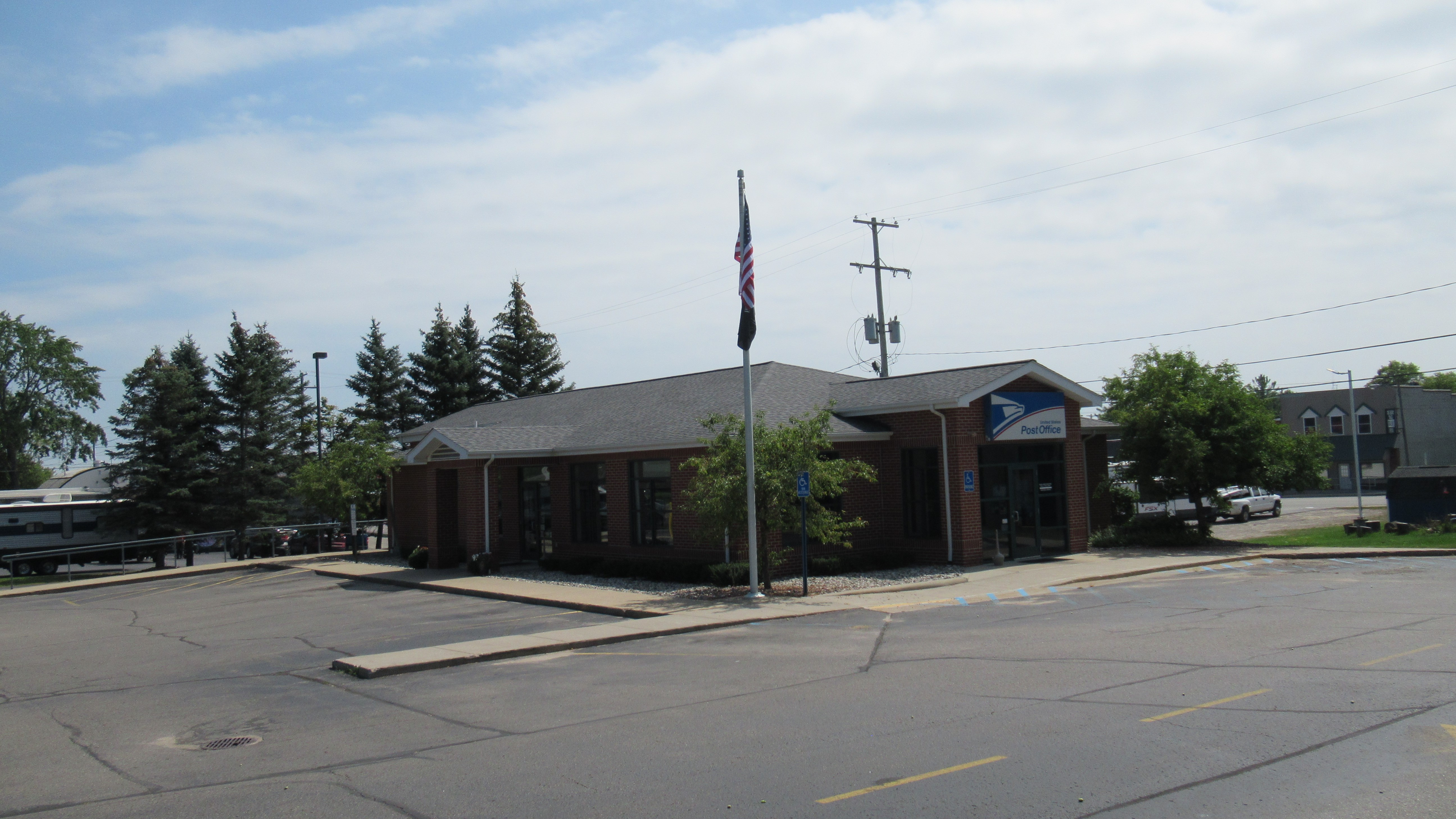
U.S. Post Office in Rose City

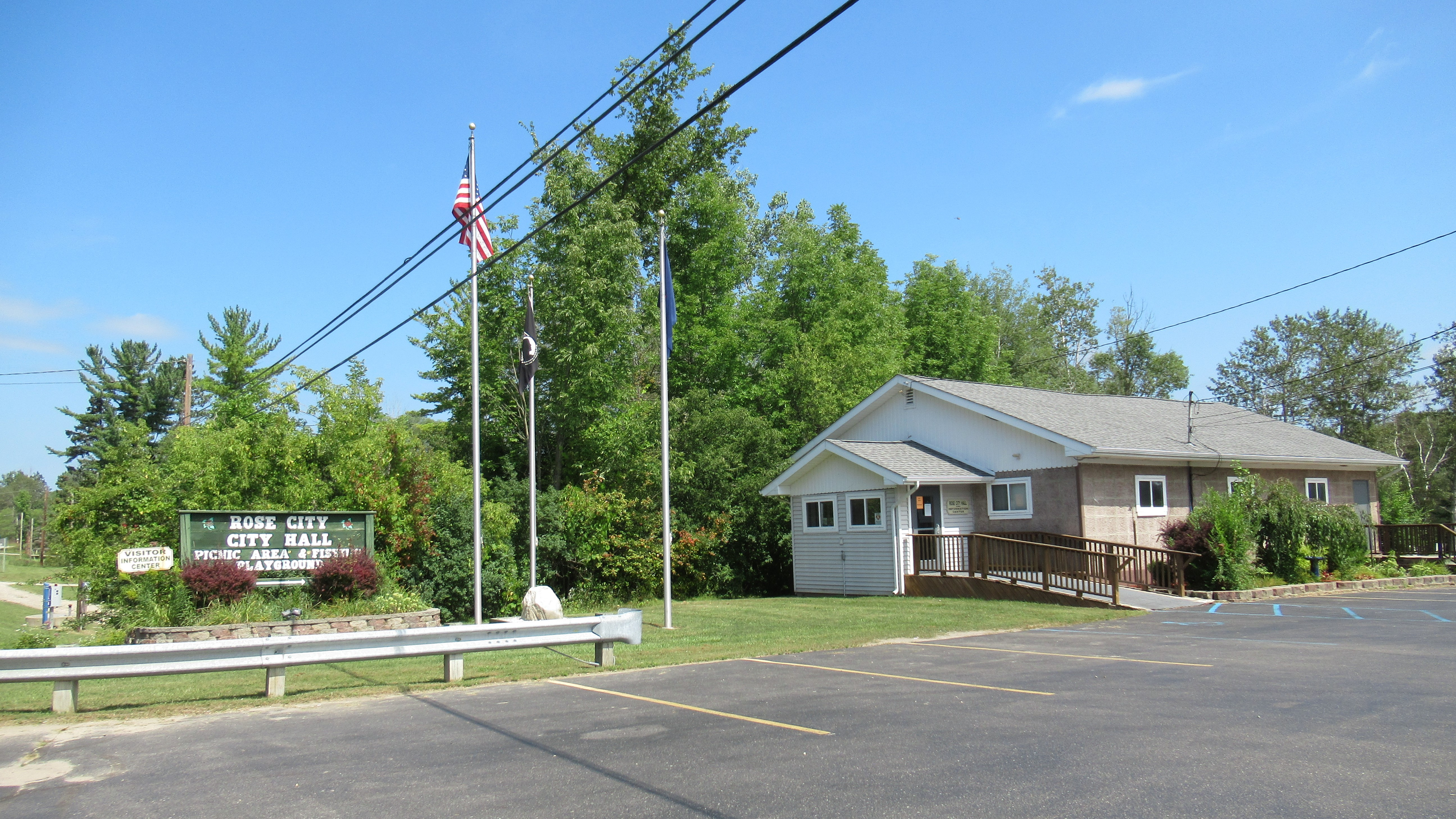
Rose City City Hall

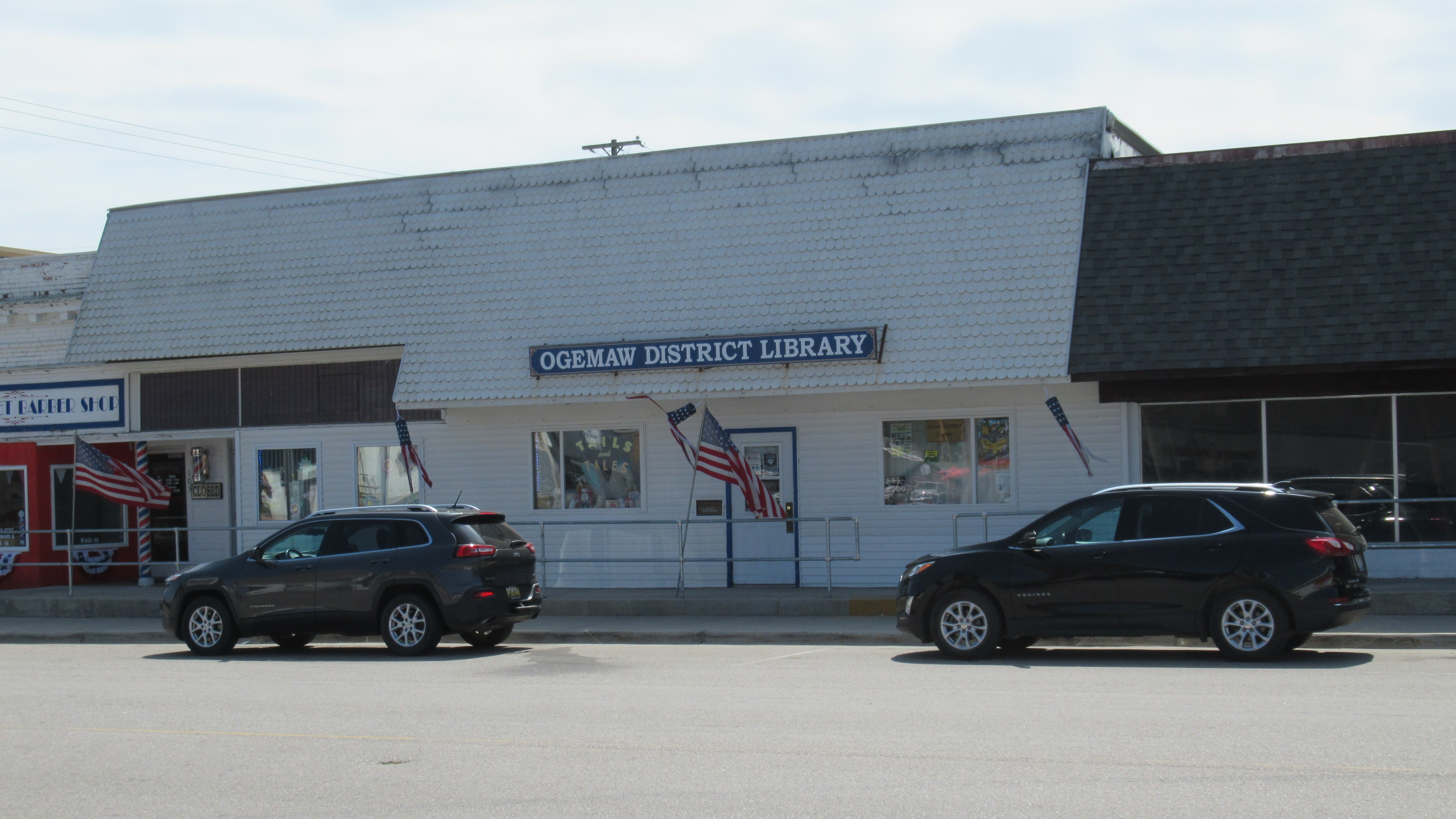
Ogemaw District Library

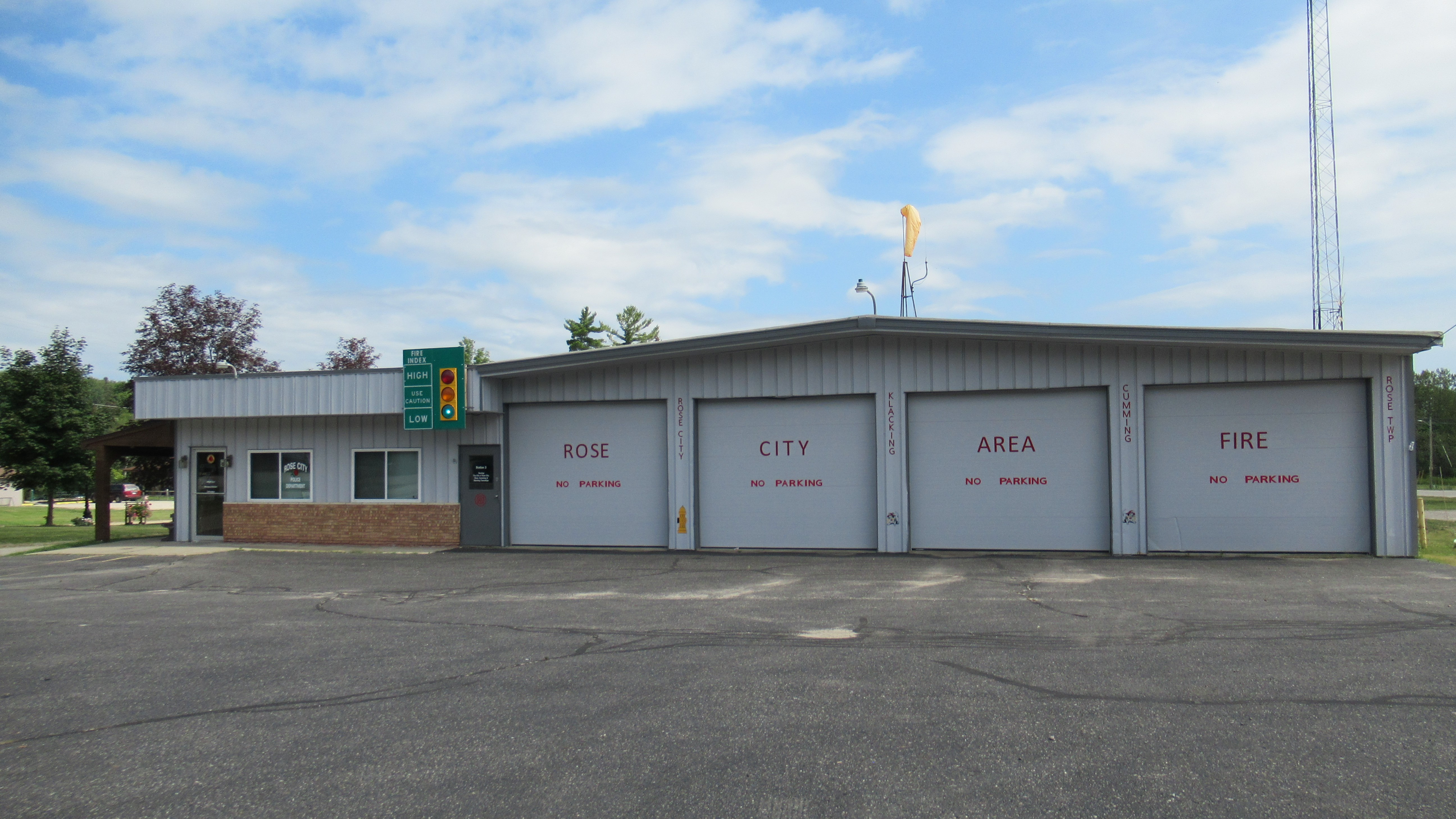
Rose City Police and Fire Department

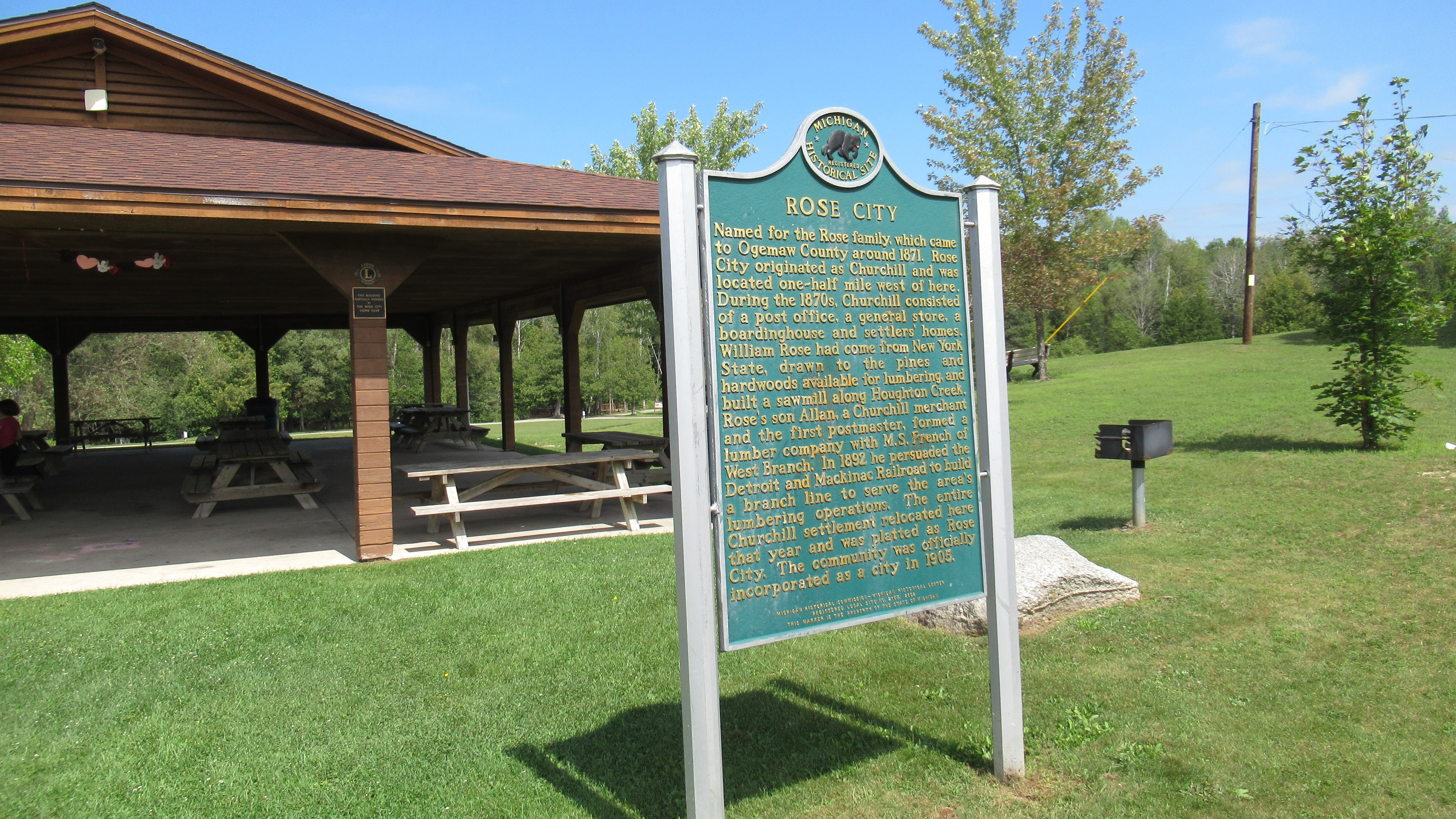
Rose City state historic marker

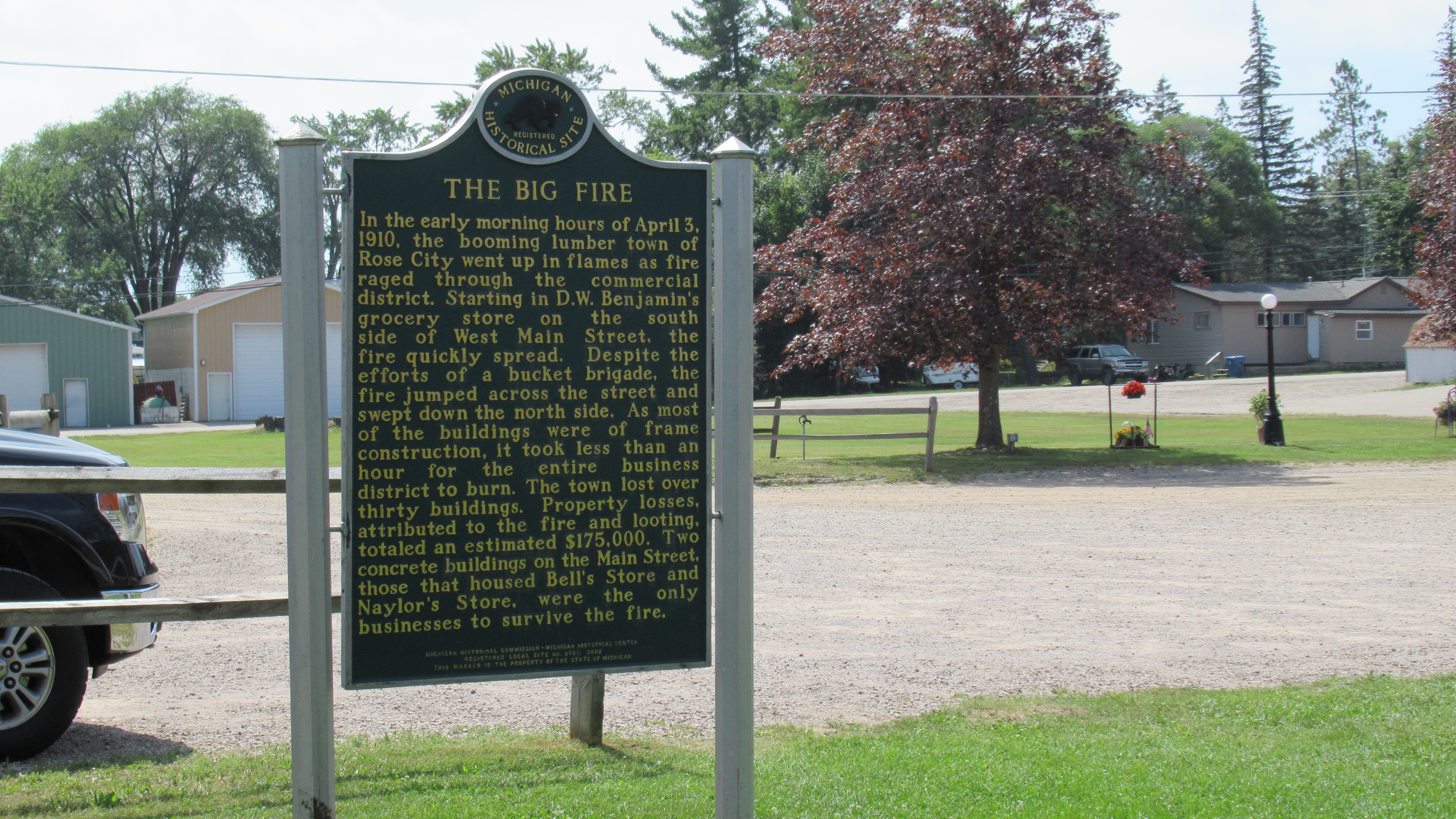
The Big Fire state historic marker
