= Auto alley =

Auto alley may refer to:

- Auto row, a local cluster of automobile retailers
- Auto Alley, an area of more concentrated automobile manufacturing mostly in Ontario, the midwestern United States, and central Mexico
