= Automobile Alley =

Automobile Alley or Automobile Alley Historic District may refer to:

- Automobile Alley Historic District (Mobile, Alabama), a historic district listed on the National Register of Historic Places (NRHP) in the United States
- Automobile Alley (Oklahoma City, Oklahoma), a NRHP-listed neighborhood

== See also ==
- Auto row, a business cluster with multiple car dealerships in a single neighborhood or road
- Automotive Historic District, a NRHP in Birmingham, Alabama
