= Jewett Five-Passenger Coach =

Jewish car

The Jewett Five-Passenger Coach was manufactured for the Jewett marque of the Paige-Detroit Motor Car Company of Detroit, Michigan.

== Specifications (1926 data) ==
- Color – Gray, Jordan Blue, or Thistle Green
- Seating Capacity –Five
- Wheelbase – 125½ inches
- Wheels - Wood
- Tires - 32” × 6.20” balloon
- Service Brakes – Hydraulic, contracting on four wheels
- Emergency Brakes – Contracting on transmission
- Engine - Eight cylinder in line, cast en bloc, 3 × 4¾ inches; head removable; valves in side; H.P. 28.8, N.A.C.C. rating
- Lubrication – Force feed and splash
- Crankshaft - Five bearing
- Radiator - Cellular
- Cooling – Water pump
- Ignition –Storage battery
- Starting System – Single Unit
- Voltage – Six to eight
- Wiring System – Single
- Gasoline System – Vacuum
- Clutch – Dry plate
- Transmission – Selective sliding
- Gear Changes – 3 forward, 1 reverse
- Drive – Spiral bevel
- Rear Springs – Semi-elliptic
- Rear Axle – Semi-floating
- Steering Gear – Worm and worm wheel

=== Standard equipment ===
New car price included the following items:

- tools
- jack
- speedometer
- ammeter
- motometer
- electric horn
- transmission theft lock
- automatic windshield cleaner
- demountable rims
- spare rim
- snubbers
- stop light
- inspection lamp and cord
- spare tire carrier
- rear view mirror
- cowl ventilator
- clock
- closed cars have smoking case, vanity cases and dome light, and trunk on Victoria and Brougham.

=== Optional equipment ===
The following was available at an extra cost:

- None

=== Prices ===
New car prices were available F.O.B. factory plus tax on the following models:

- Touring - $2575
- Playboy - $2575
- Victoria - $2775
- Brougham - $2875
- Friendly Three - $2875
- Five Passenger Sedan - $2975
- Seven Passenger Sedan - $3225
- Seven Passenger Suburban Sedan - $3375

== See also ==
- Jewett (automobile)
