= Auto row =

Business cluster with multiple car dealerships

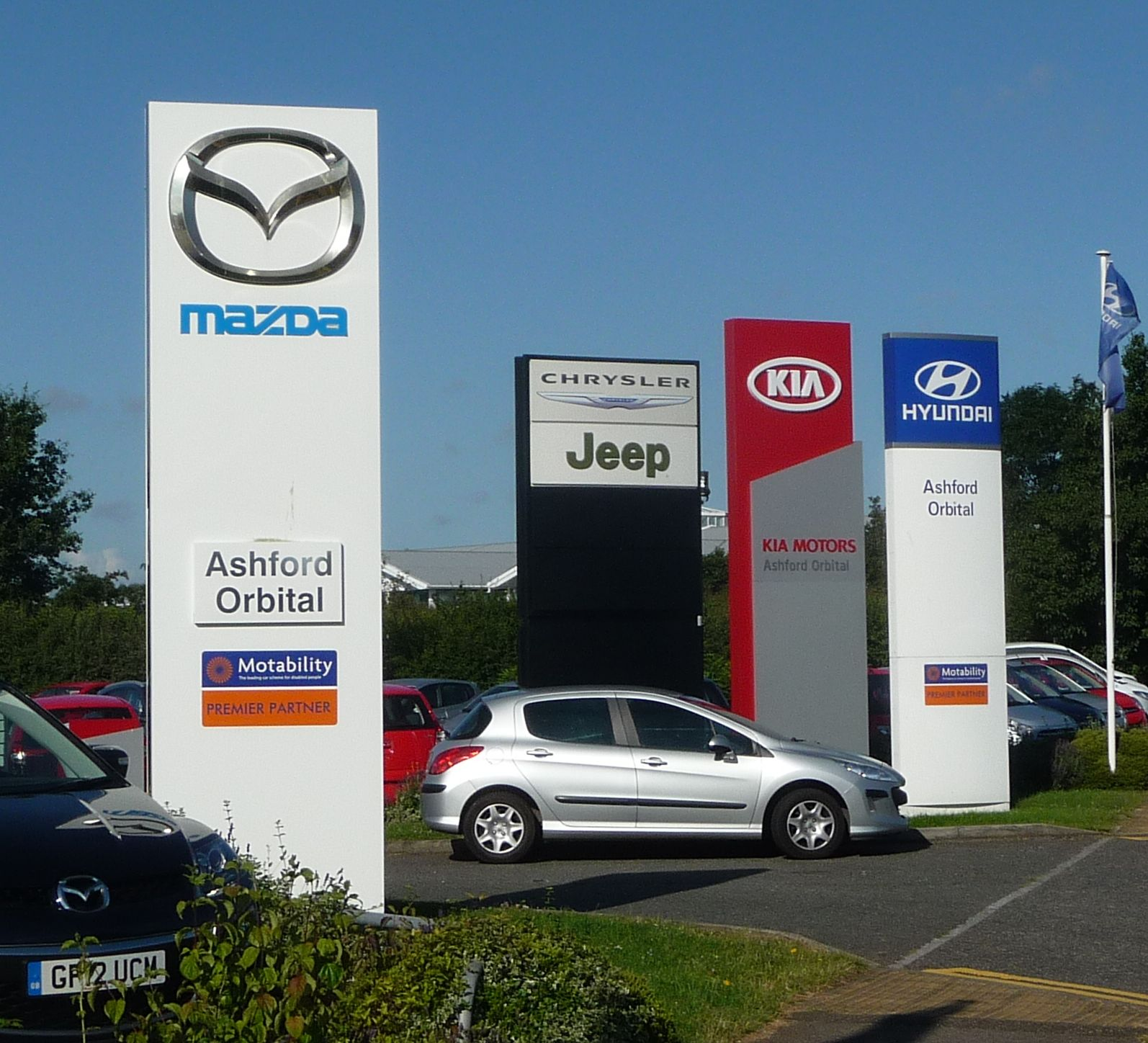
Example of a multiple dealership or "auto row" in Kent, England

An auto row or auto mall is a business cluster with multiple car dealerships in a single neighborhood or road. Auto rows are distinct from car supermarkets which are a single, large dealership.

== Economics ==
Auto rows, like mall food courts, are an example of the economies of agglomeration. Even though being grouped together increases immediate competition, the auto row becomes more of destination for consumers and benefits all the dealerships. Many consumers may want to test drive automobiles from multiple companies before making a purchase and the auto row provides one stop shopping. Competing dealerships also often share advertising costs to promote their single destination under an agreed-upon marketing name. Auto rows attract ancillary businesses including car washes, insurance offices, and body shops that benefit all of the dealerships.

== Geography ==
Central Place Theory may explain why destination stores do better when centrally located. Also, in some areas, local zoning may exclude car dealerships from many retail districts so that locating in an auto row becomes less about market forces and more about government planning.

Traditionally, car dealership had small window front showrooms. Later, most car dealerships converted to large parking lot-based stores with integrated parts and service departments. In many case, an auto row is a vehicle-themed historic district rather than a current location to purchase cars.

== Examples ==
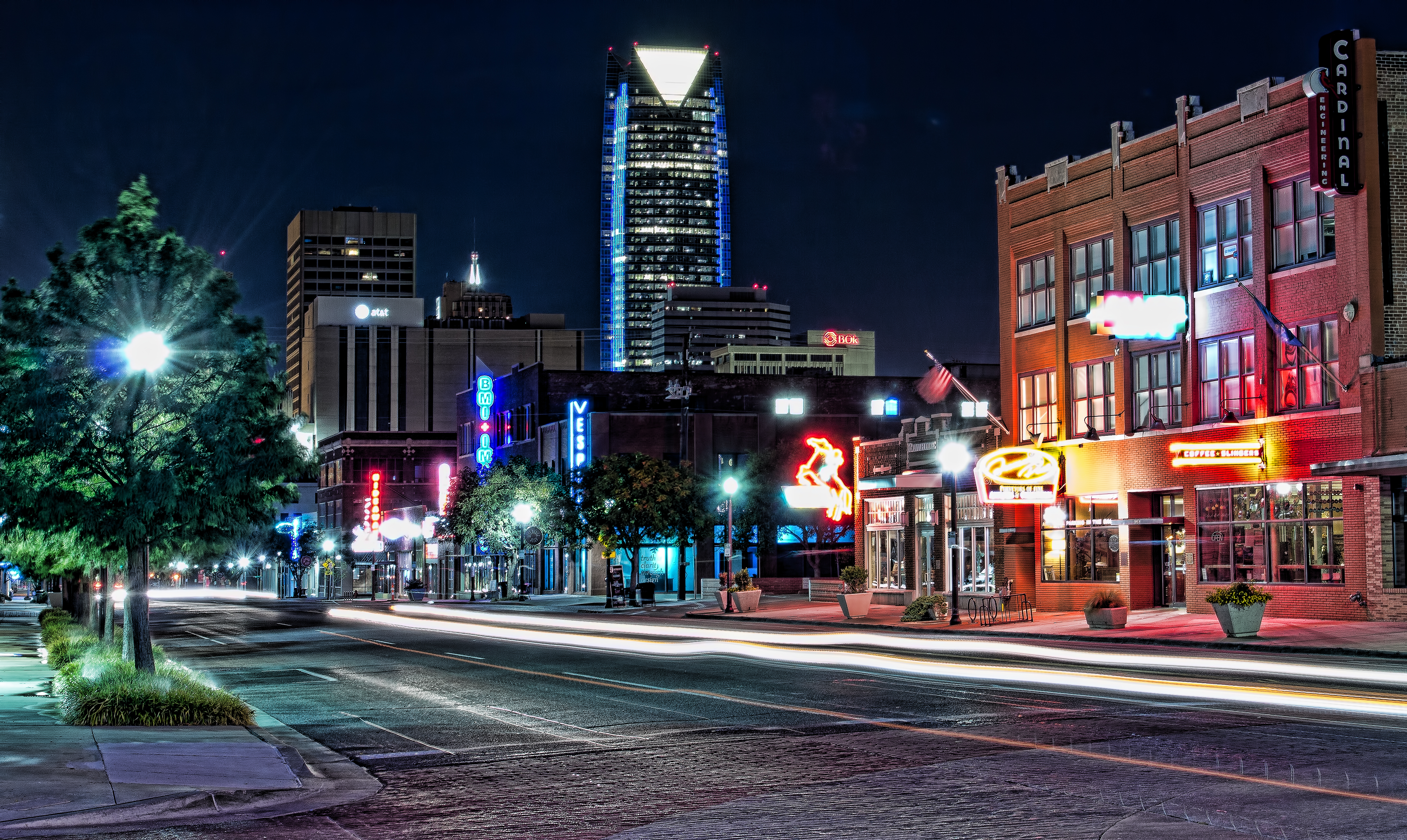
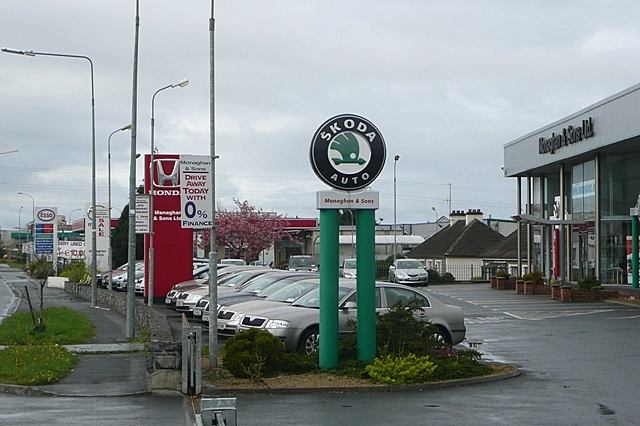
(Left): Automobile Alley in Oklahoma, an historic auto row; (right): multiple dealerships in Galway, Ireland
- Automobile Alley Historic District, Mobile, Alabama
- Automobile Alley, Oklahoma City, Oklahoma
- Automobile Row (Omaha, Nebraska)
- 34 Avenue, Edmonton, Alberta
- Broadway Auto Row, Oakland, California
- Capitol Expressway, San Jose, California
- Cerritos Auto Square, Cerritos, California
- Motor Row District, Chicago, Illinois
- Driver's Village, built on the site of a dead mall in Syracuse, New York

== See also ==
- Milwaukee Junction, a former agglomeration of auto manufacturers.
- List of historic filling stations
