= Broadway Auto Row, Oakland, California =

Oakland's Broadway Auto Row is the area north of downtown Oakland along Broadway between Grand Avenue (Uptown) at the Southwest and I-580, 40th Street or even 51st Street to the Northeast. The strip has a history of car dealerships and other automotive service businesses as far back as 1912. The businesses and sales in the area are a part of Oakland's economic base. In recent years, the area is seen as ripe for mixed-use development intensification, and other bicycle and pedestrian improvements.

== List of Companies That Have Operated Within The Area ==
- Arbuthnot's Tire Shop
- A. S. Chisholm Company
- Auto Ignition and Equipment Company
- Broadway Ford
- Cochran & Celli Auto
- Golden Gate Steam Laundry
- H.O. Harrison Company
- King Kovers (1967-2016)
- Motor Electric Specialty Company
- Pacific Truck & Tractor Company
- Paige Motor Company
- Schelbner & Hodson
- The Secor Brothers

== Tax base ==
During his term in office, former Oakland Mayor Jerry Brown appeared in a series of televised "Buy Oakland" commercials.
