= Jewett (automobile) =

American automobile company

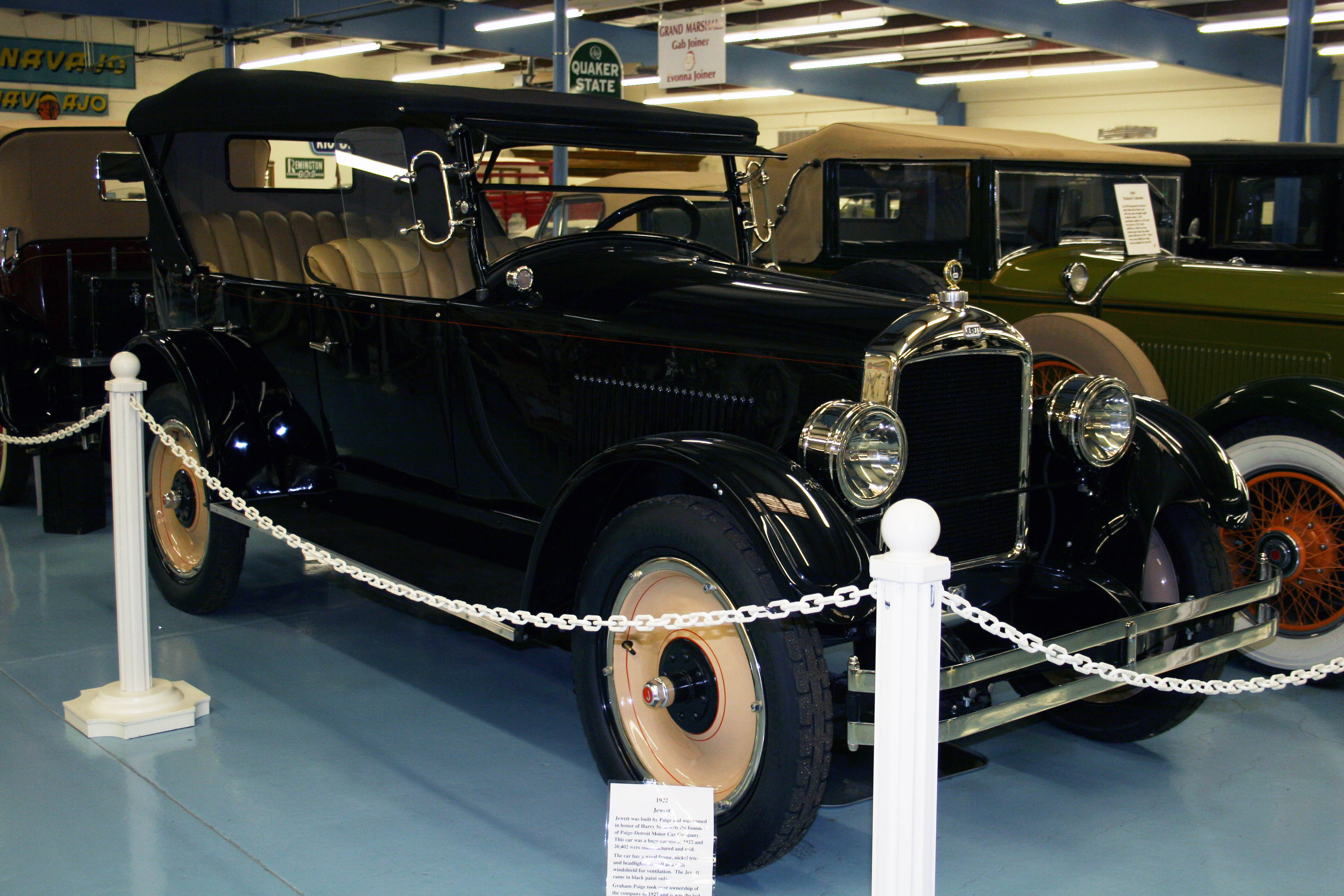
1922 Jewett 18-22 Five Passenger Touring Car

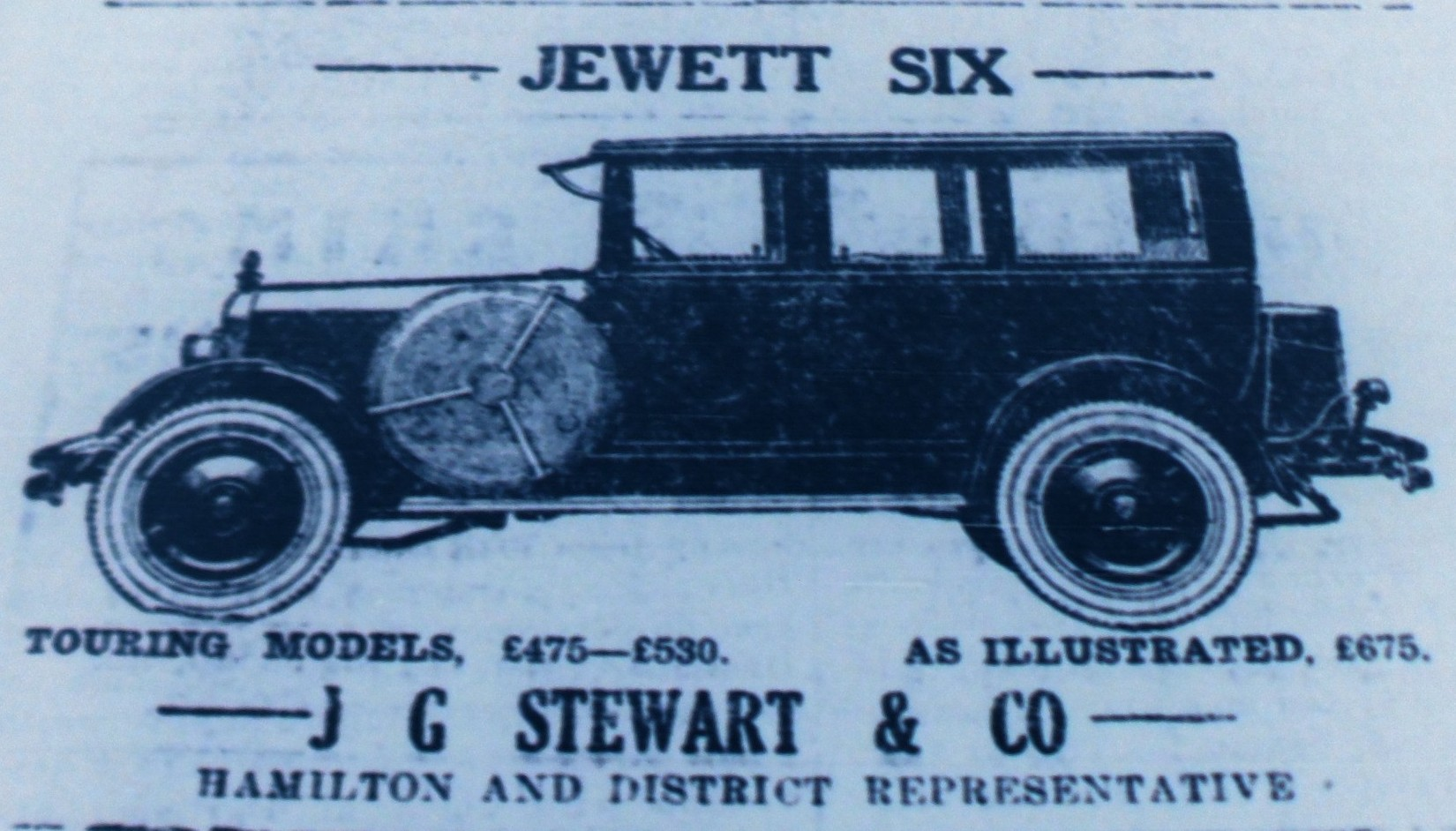

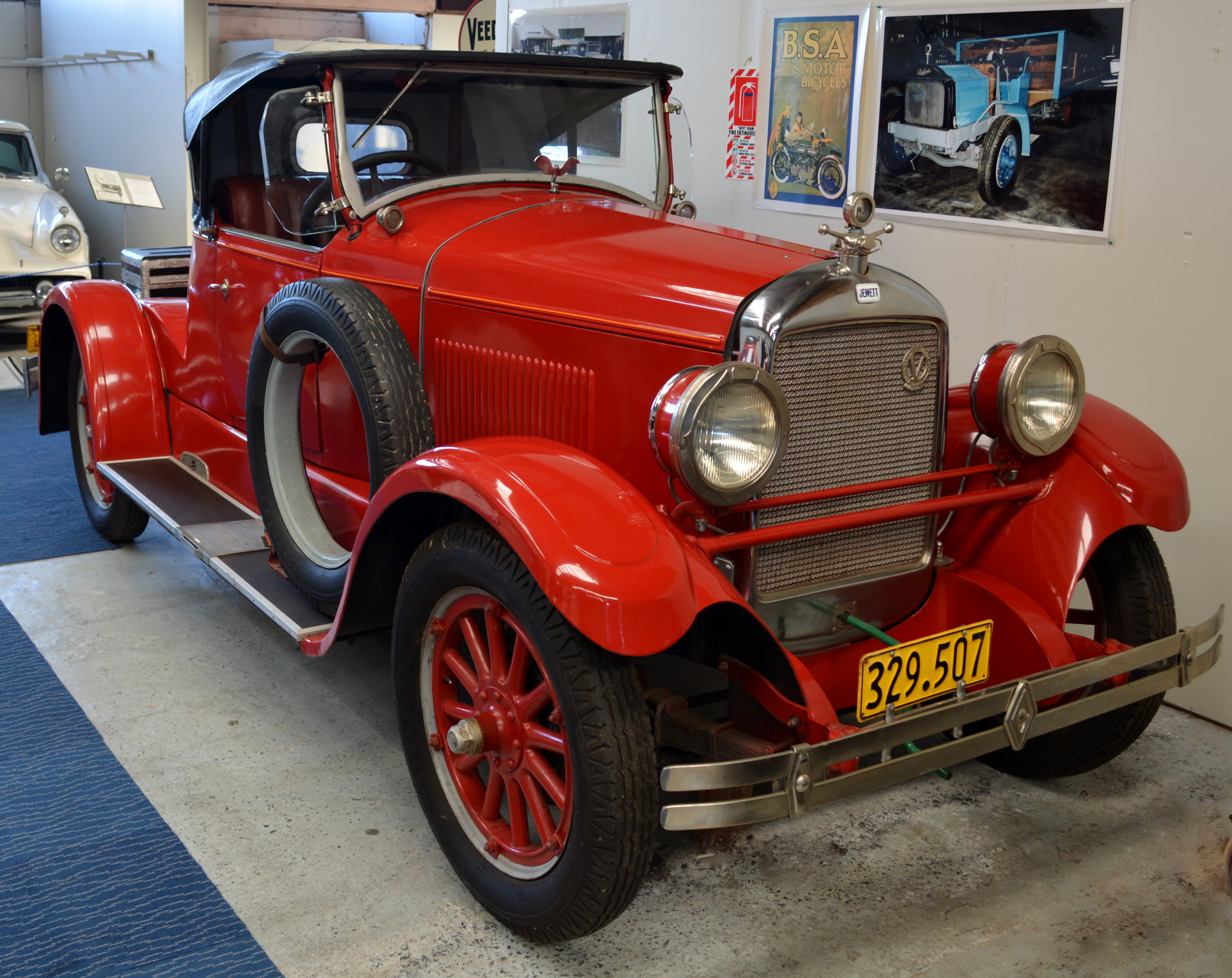
1925 Jewett Boat Tail

The Jewett was an automobile built in Detroit, Michigan, United States by the Paige-Detroit Motor Car Company from March 1922 until December 1926. The Jewett was named after Harry M. Jewett, president of Paige-Detroit.

== History ==
After the first 17 months of production, approx. 40,000 vehicles were sold. The car was marketed as a Jewett 'Six' — a companion to the Paige, the primary product of Paige-Detroit. The 1922-24 cars had a 50 h.p. Jewett motor, the 1925 cars had a 55 h.p. Jewett motor and the 1926 cars had a 40-hp Continental motor. For several years, Jewett cars featured a powerful straight-six engine that could climb mountains. The last of the vehicles were available with hydraulic brakes.

The company was purchased by the Graham Brothers on January 3, 1927, and the Jewett became a Paige, for that year only. The car was then rebranded as a Graham-Paige for 1928 only.

== Dash plates ==
Embedded in the dashboard of every Jewett was an amulet, visible on the passenger side as a dash plate. Harry's wife Mary was something of a spiritualist, and these amulets were purported to have mystical power that protected the occupants. Harry Jewett's estate, once a great plantation, has all but vanished. The ruins near Rose City in Northern Lower Michigan are still visible. Discussions about restoring parts of the estate as a historical park have not yet borne fruit.

== See also ==
- Jewett Five-Passenger Coach
- Rifle River State Recreation Area
