= Graham-Paige 835 =

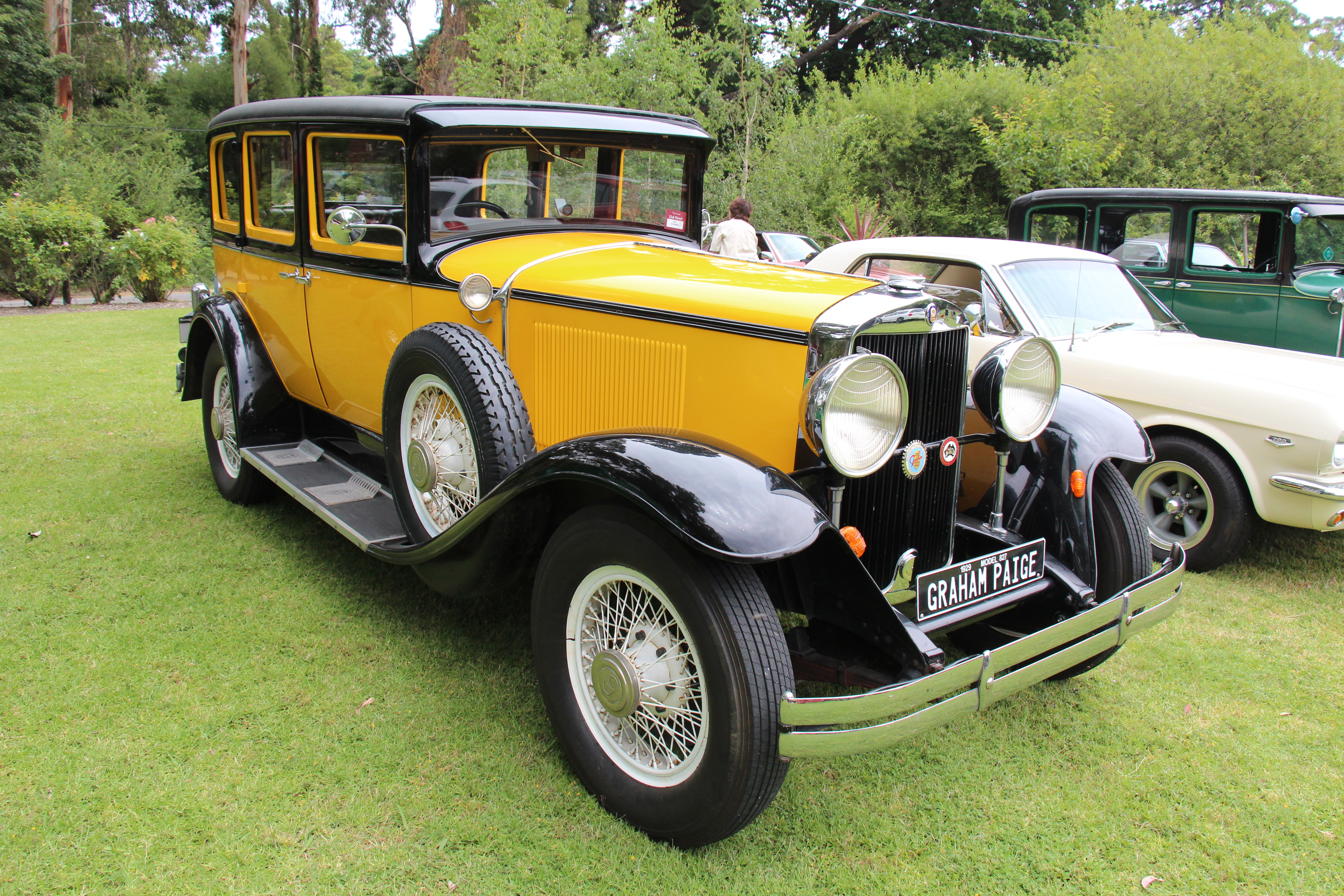
1929 Graham Paige 827 Sedan

The Graham-Paige 835 introduced at the New York Automobile Show in January 1928 was the largest of that year's Graham-Paige range. It was powered by a 120 bhp, 5279 cc straight eight-cylinder L-head engine bought in from Continental. The transmission was a Warner Gear four-speed unit with first intended only as a reserve or emergency gear, second for normal starts and third and fourth as a choice as top gear depending on road conditions. The 135-inch (3,400 mm) wheelbase chassis had balloon tires and pressed steel wheels.

The 835 model was revised for 1929 and was offered in two sizes designated the 827 and 837, on 127-inch (3,200 mm) and 137-inch (3,500 mm) wheelbases respectively. The engines were rubber mounted.

== Papal limousine ==
A Graham-Paige 837 limousine was supplied to Pope Pius XI, becoming one of the first papal cars.
