= Graham-Paige =

Defunct American motor vehicle manufacturer

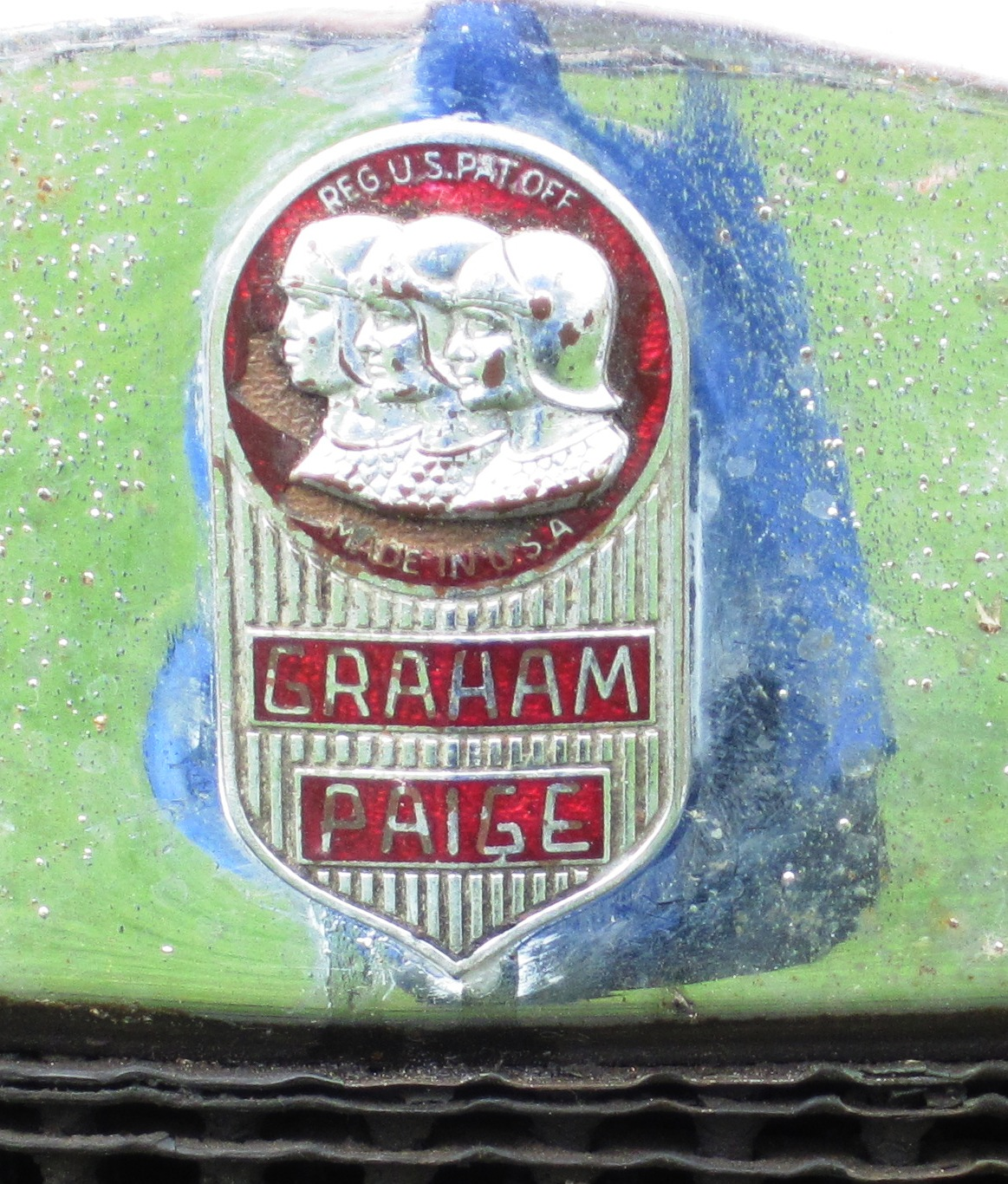
- Industry: Automobiles, trucks
- Founded: 1927; 99 years ago
- Founders: Joseph B. Graham; Robert C. Graham; Ray A. Graham
- Defunct: 1962
- Successor: Madison Square Garden Corporation
- Headquarters: Evansville, Indiana, U.S.

Graham-Paige was an American automobile manufacturer founded by brothers Joseph B., Robert C., and Ray A. Graham in 1927. Automobile production ceased in 1940, and its automotive assets were acquired by Kaiser-Frazer in 1947. As a corporate entity, the Graham-Paige name continued until 1962.

== History ==
=== Graham Brothers ===
After successful involvement in a glass manufacturing company (eventually sold to Libbey Owens Ford), brothers Joseph B., Robert C., and Ray A. Graham began in 1919 to produce kits to convert Ford Model Ts into trucks and modify Model TTs. That led to the brothers building their trucks using engines of various manufacturers and the Graham Brothers brand. Eventually, they settled on Dodge engines, and soon the trucks were sold by Dodge dealers. The Grahams expanded from beginnings in Evansville, Indiana, opening plants in 1922 on Meldrum Avenue in Detroit, Michigan, of 13,000 square feet (1,200 m^{2}), and in 1925 on Cherokee Lane in Stockton, California. The Canadian market was supplied by the Canadian Dodge plant. Dodge purchased the Graham Brothers truck firm in 1925, and the three Graham brothers took on executive positions at Dodge.

In 1927, the truck program consisted of the models MD (1.5 tons), LD (1.5 tons), OD (2 tons), TD (2 tons), ODH (2.5 tons), TDH (2.5 tons), and a type YD bus for 21 people. Graham's new truck line for 1928 included four 4-cylinder models ranging from 1/2 to 1 1/2 short tons (450 to 1,360 kg) and one 2-short-ton (1,800 kg) 6-cylinder model, which used the same engine as the Dodge Brothers Senior Six, lightly modified for truck duty. The Graham Brothers brand lasted until 1929, Chrysler Corporation having taken over Dodge in 1928.

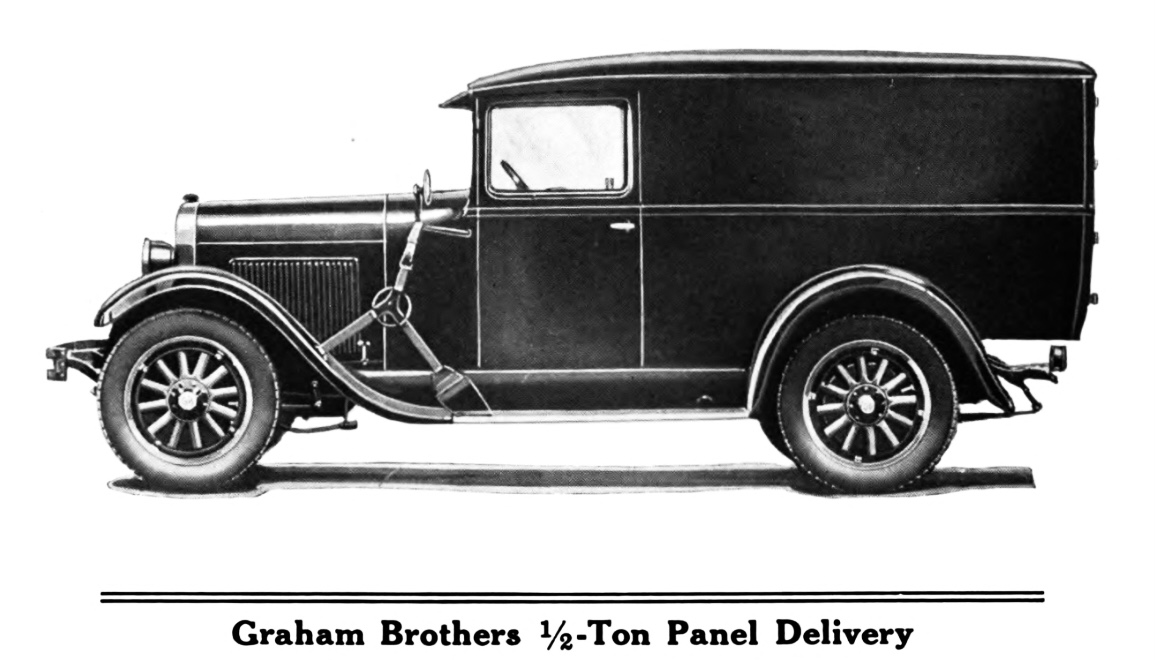
Graham Brothers 0,5t (1928)

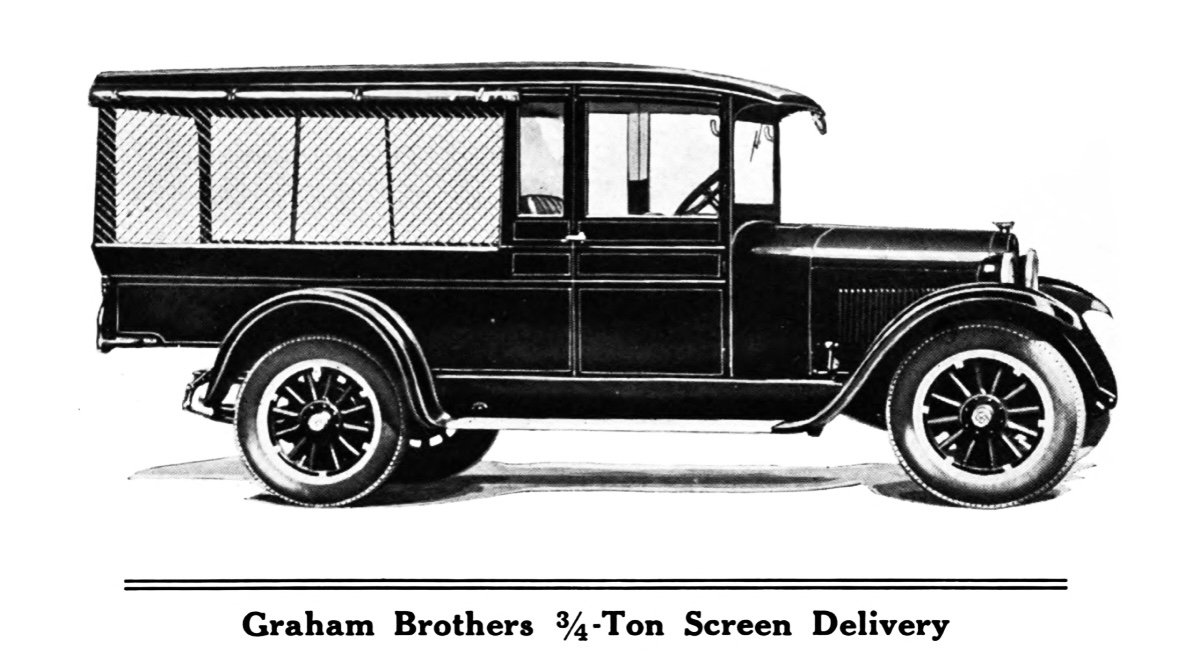
Graham Brothers 0,75t (1928)

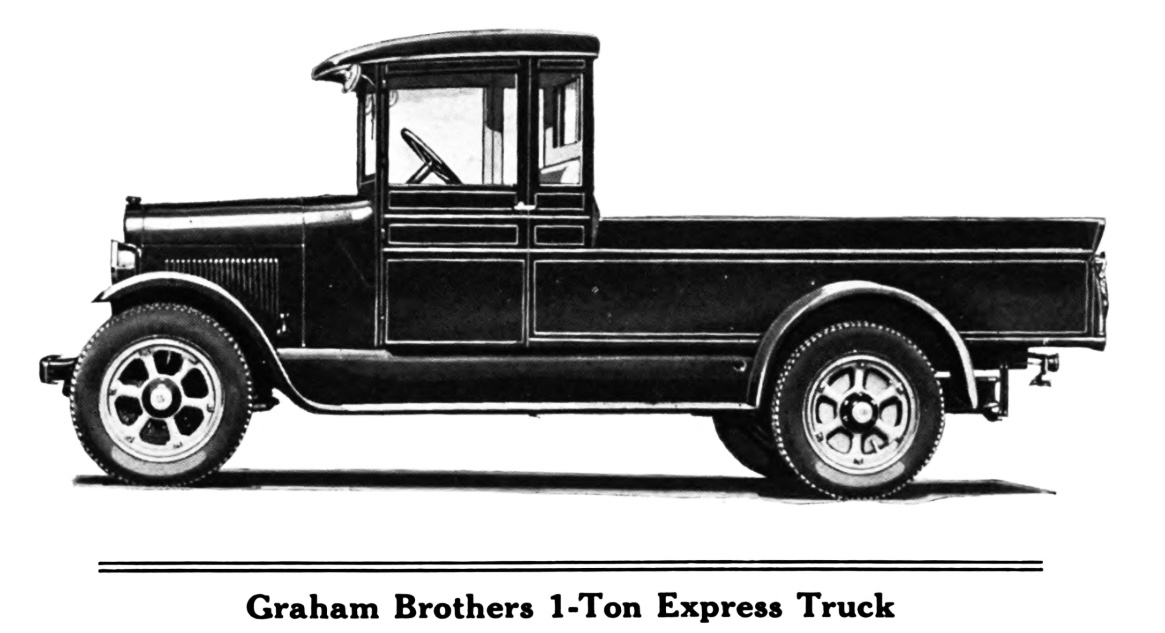
Graham Brothers 1t (1928)

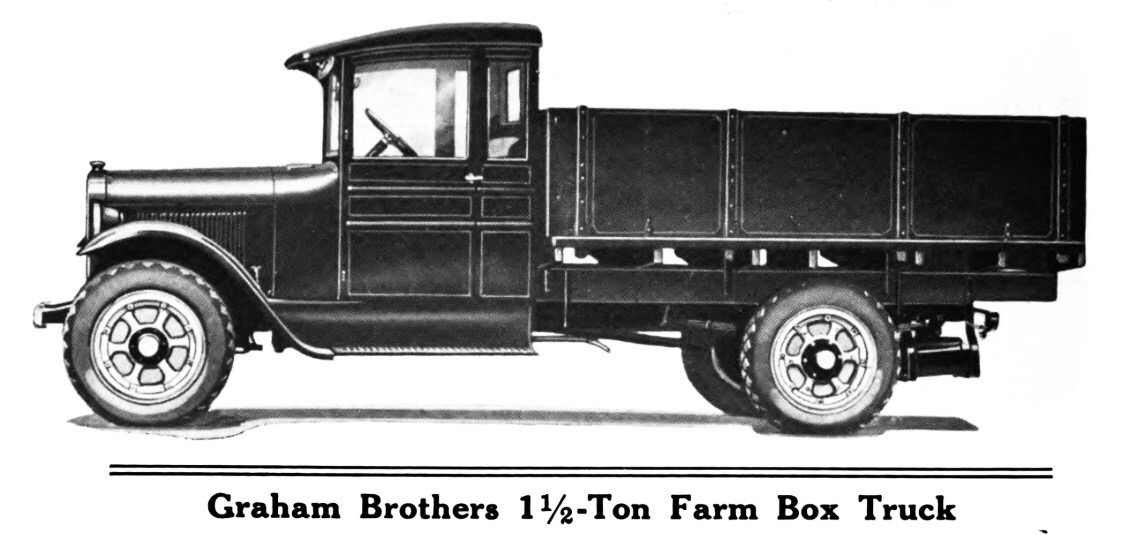
Graham Brothers 1,5t (1928)

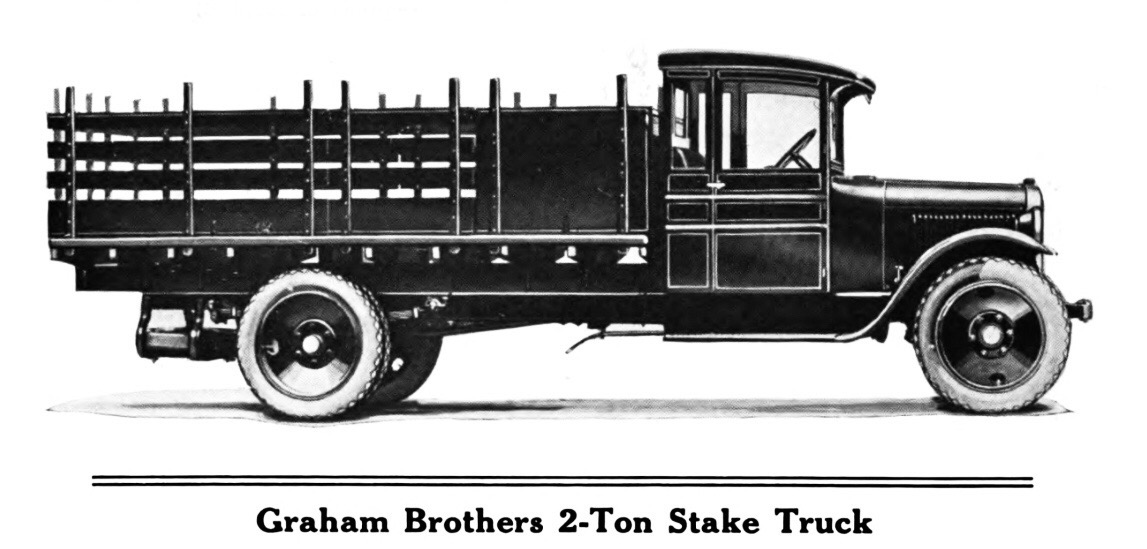
Graham Brothers TD 2t (1928)

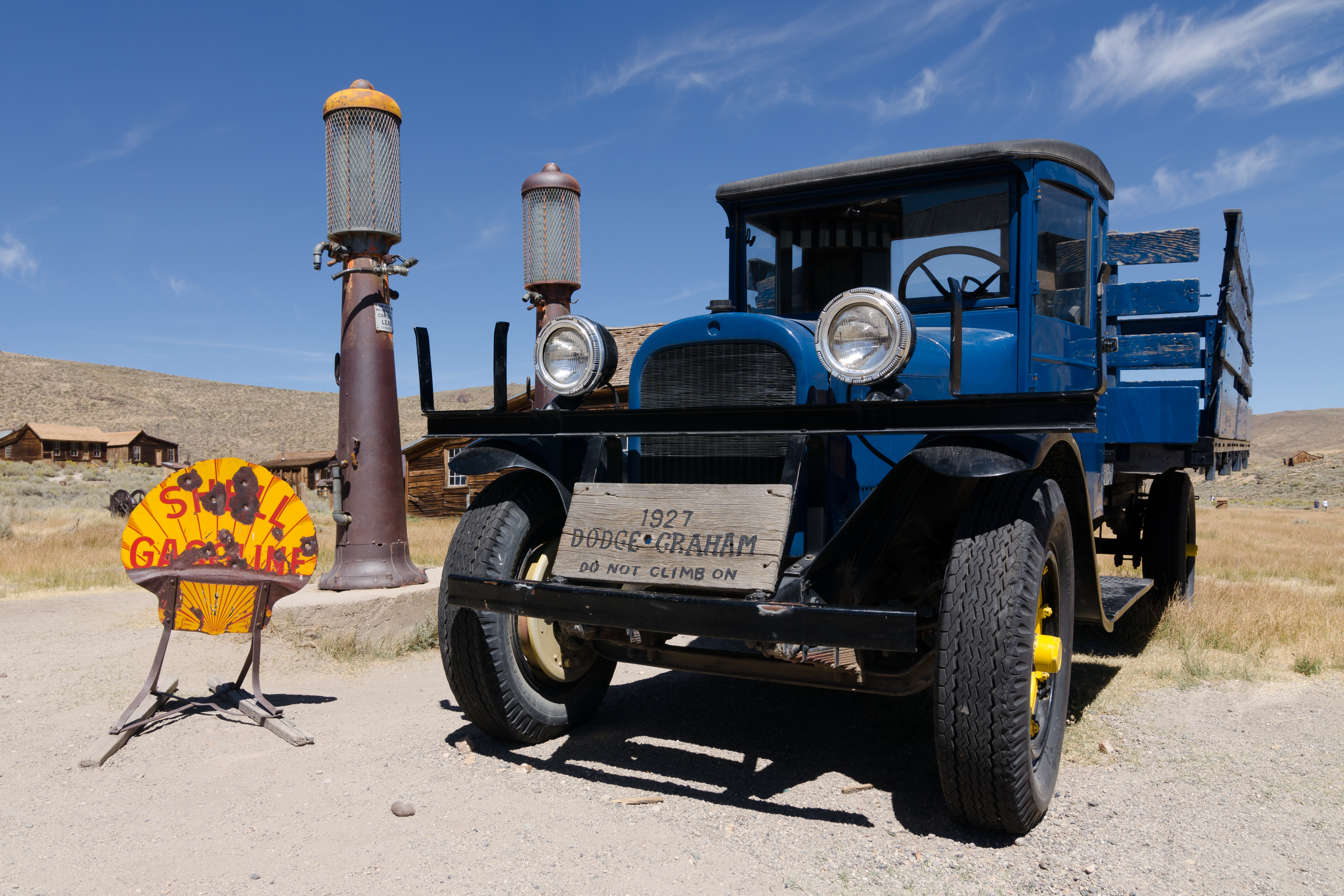
1927 Dodge Graham truck

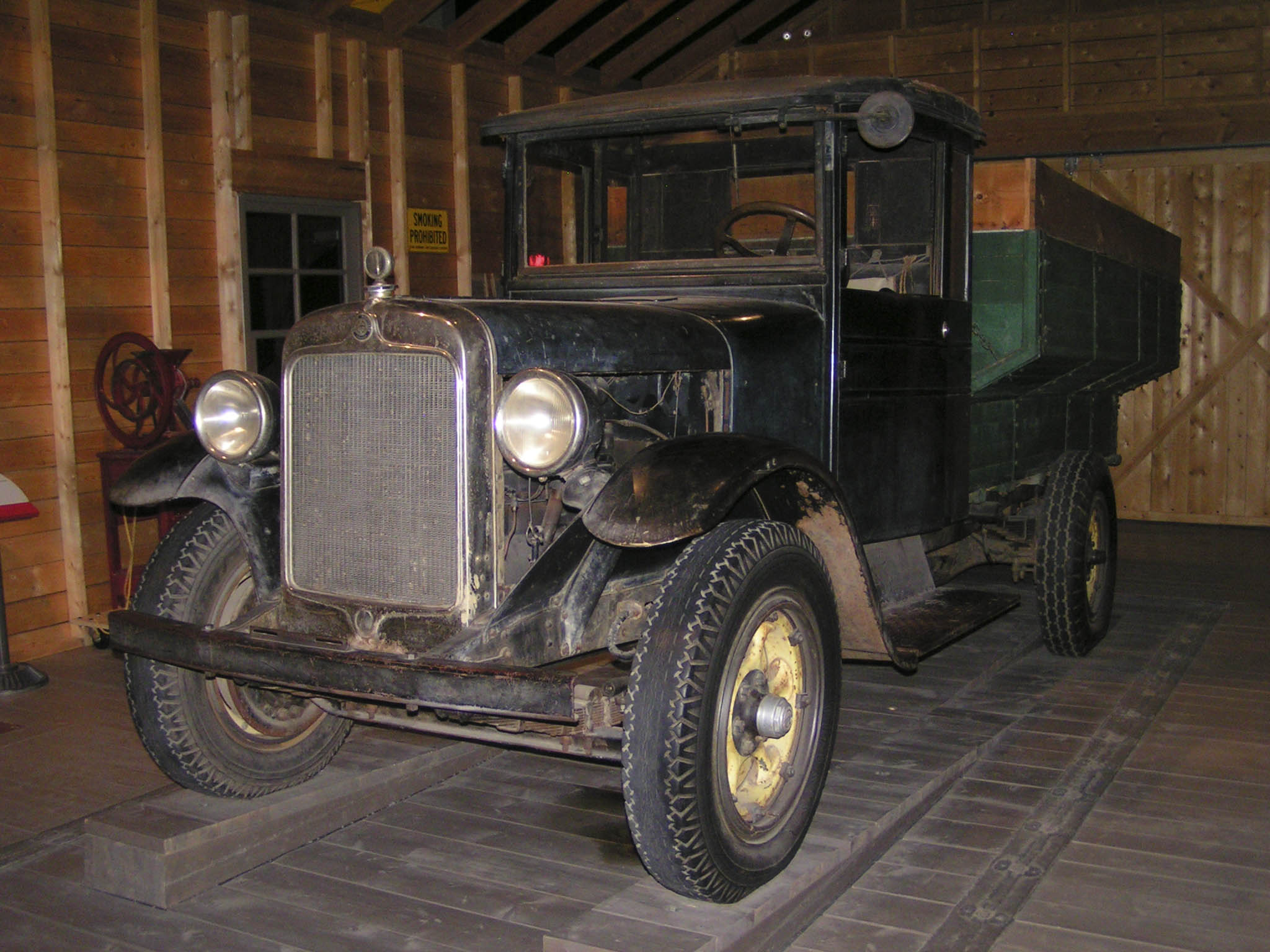
Graham Brothers truck (1928)

=== Graham-Paige ===
In 1927, with the banking syndicate controlling Dodge trying to sell the company, the Graham brothers decided to enter the automobile business on their own. In 1927, they purchased the Paige-Detroit Motor Car Company, makers of Paige and Jewett automobiles, for $3.5 million ($64,870,690 in 2025 dollars). Joseph became president, Robert vice-president, and Ray secretary-treasurer of the company. The company's initial offerings included a line of Graham-Paige cars with 6 and 8-cylinder engines. For a while, a line of light trucks was offered under the Paige name, soon discontinued when Dodge reminded the Grahams about the non-competition agreement they had signed as part of the sale of the Graham Brothers Company. Graham earned a reputation for quality and sales quickly rose. Graham also had some success in racing, which helped boost sales. The Graham company logo included profiles of the three brothers and was used in insignia on the cars including badges and taillight lens. In 1929, five new model types were launched. These are the models 612, 615, 621, 827, and 837. The first number was the explanation of the number of cylinders.

Graham-Paige made most of their own bodies and engines. The Graham brothers had solved a long-standing Paige body supply dilemma by purchasing the Wayne Body Company in Wayne, Michigan, and expanding the factory along with other body plants. They did not have a foundry and contracted with Continental for these services relative to their engines. Some models did use Continental stock engines. Graham-Paige's own engineering department designed most of the engines used in Graham-Paige cars. The 1938–1940 "Spirit of Motion" cars and Hollywood models are frequently incorrectly stated to use Continental engines. After World War II, Continental produced a lesser version of Graham-Paige's 217-cubic-inch-displacement engine used in the previously mentioned models. These engines were used in the post-war Kaiser and Frazer automobiles.

Initially, Graham-Paige withstood the onset of the Great Depression well, but sales fell as the decade wore on. The 1932 models were designed by Amos Northup. This particular design has been noted as the "single most influential design in automotive history." The new 8-cylinder engine was called the "Blue Streak." However, the press and public quickly adopted the name "Blue Streak" for the cars themselves. The design introduced a number of innovative ideas. The most copied was the enclosed fenders, thus covering the mud and grime built up on the underside. The radiator cap was moved under the hood, which itself was later modified to cover the cowl, and end at the base of the windshield.

For engineering, the rear kickup on the chassis frame was eliminated by the adoption of a 'banjo' frame. Unlike contemporary practice, the rear axle was placed through large openings on both sides of the frame, with rubber snubbers to absorb any shock if the car axle should make contact. This in turn permitted a wider body. To help lower the car, the rear springs were mounted on the outer sides of the chassis frame and not under the frame. This idea was eventually copied by other manufacturers - Chrysler, for example, in 1957.

For 1934, Graham introduced a crankshaft-driven supercharger, designed in-house by Graham Assistant Chief Engineer Floyd F. Kishline. At first offered only in the top 8-cylinder models, the supercharger was adapted to the six in 1936 when the eights were dropped. Through the years, Graham would produce more supercharged cars than any other automobile manufacturer until Buick surpassed them in the 1990s.

By 1935, the "Blue Streak" styling was getting rather dated. A restyling of the front and rear ends for 1935 proved to be a disaster, making the cars appear higher and narrower. Having no money for a new body, Graham signed an agreement with REO Motor Car Company to purchase car bodies, paying them $7.50 ($164 in 2025 dollars) in royalties for each Hayes-built body. The engines did have new full water jackets. Graham added new front end styling and revised detailing to these bodies to create the 1936 and 1937 Grahams.

Amos Northup of Murray Body was hired to design a new model for 1938, but he died before the design was complete. It is believed the final design was completed by Graham engineers. The new 1938 Graham was introduced with the slogan "Spirit of Motion". The fenders, wheel openings and grille all appeared to be moving forward. The design was widely praised in the American press and by American designers. It also won the prestigious Concours D'Elegance in Paris, France. Wins were also recorded in the Prix d'Avant-Garde at Lyon, the Prix d'Elegance at Bordeaux, and the Grand Prix d'Honneur at Deauville, France. Its cut-back grille later gained the car the name "Sharknose", which appears to have origins in the 1950s. The styling was a complete flop in sales. The most reliable estimates, from period publications, suggest the total production of all three years of these cars is between 6,000 and 13,000 units. With this low production Graham limped through 1939 and 1940.

=== Joint venture ===
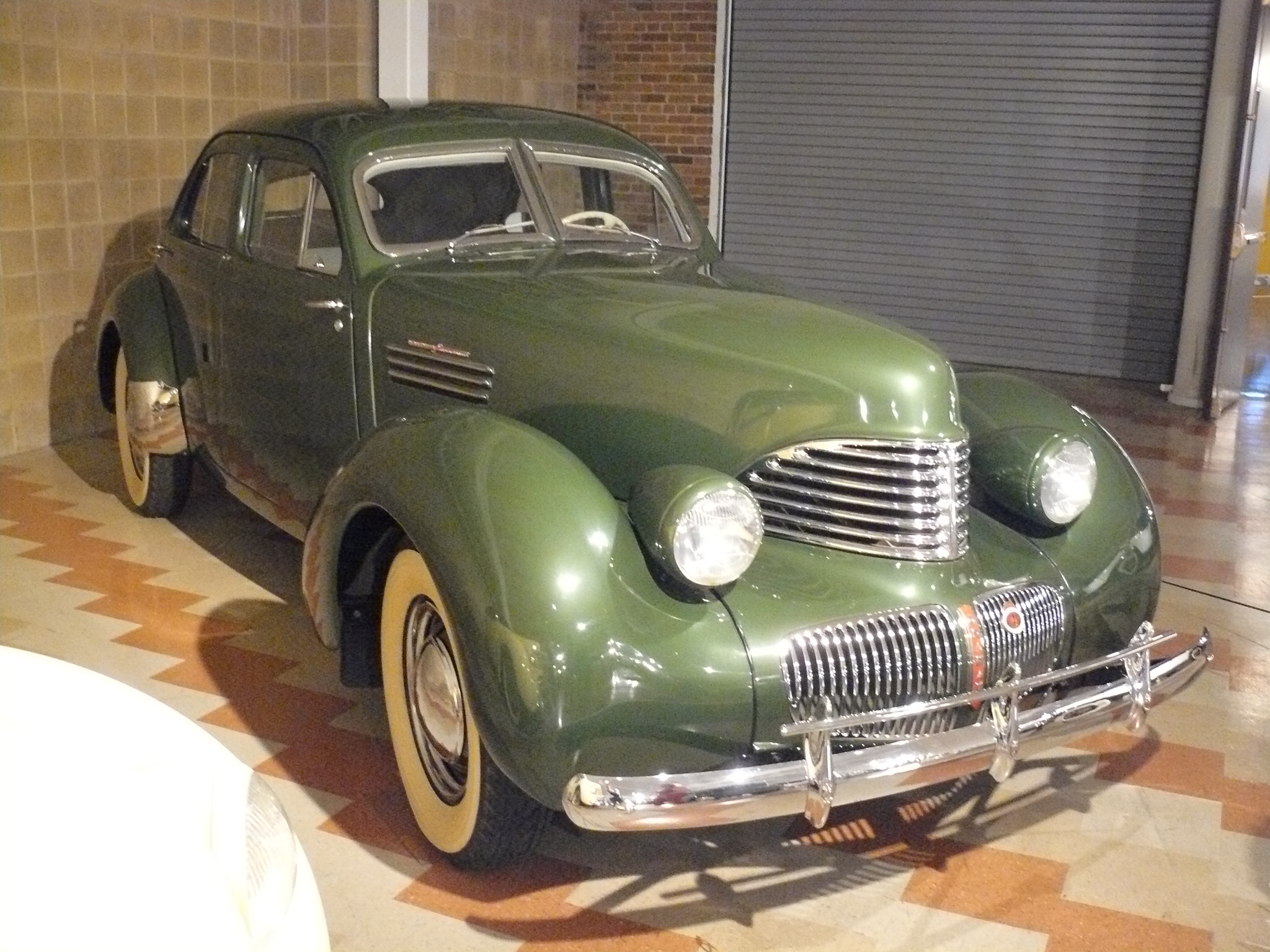
1941 Graham Hollywood Supercharged

Desperate for a winning offering and unable to retool, Graham made a deal with the ailing Hupp Motor Co. in late 1939. According to the deal, the faltering company entered into an arrangement with Hupmobile to build cars based on the body dies of the stunning Gordon Buehrig-designed Cord 810/812. In an effort to remain in business, Hupp had acquired the Cord dies, but lacked the financial resources to build the car. Hupp's Skylark was priced at US$895 ($20,716 in 2025 dollars), and only about 300 were built.

Graham agreed to build the Hupmobile Skylark on a contract basis, while receiving the rights to use the distinctive Cord dies to produce a similar car of its own, to be called the Hollywood. The striking Skylark/Hollywood differed from the Cord from the cowl forward with a redesigned hood, front fenders and conventional headlights, achieved by automotive designer John Tjaarda of Lincoln-Zephyr fame. The Cord's longer hood was not needed, as the Hupp and Graham versions were rear-wheel drive. This also necessitated modifying the floor to accept a driveshaft. Graham chose the four-door Beverly sedan shape for the Hollywood rather than the two-door convertible, as they wanted the Hollywood to be a popular, mass-market car.

Both versions used 6-cylinder engines. The Skylark was powered by a 245 cu in (4,010 cc) Hupp; the Hollywood was available with a standard 218 cu in (3,570 cc) and an optional supercharged version, both manufactured by Graham-Paige. While some 1500 Hollywoods were built, it did not stop the company's slide. After its public introduction, orders poured in. However, manufacturing difficulties caused months of delay before deliveries began. Having bodies ultimately built by the coachbuilder Hayes did not help. Customers tired of waiting, and most of the orders were cancelled. Despite an enthusiastic initial public response, the car actually ended up being a worse flop in the sales department for both Graham and Hupmobile than either firm's respective preceding models. The company suspended manufacturing in September 1940, only to reopen its plant for military production for World War II.

=== Postwar ===
The company resumed automobile production in 1946 producing a modern-looking new car, the 1947 Frazer, named for new Graham-Paige president Joseph W. Frazer, in partnership with Henry J. Kaiser. It also began production of farm equipment under the Rototiller name. In August 1945, Graham-Paige announced plans to resume production under the Graham name, but the plan never materialized. On February 5, 1947, Graham-Paige stockholders approved the transfer of all their automotive assets to Kaiser-Frazer, an automobile company formed by Frazer and Kaiser, in return for 750,000 shares of Kaiser-Frazer stock and other considerations. Graham's manufacturing facilities on Warren Avenue were sold to Chrysler, who used the plants first for DeSoto body and engine production, and finally for assembly of the Imperial for the 1959, 1960, and 1961 model years.

=== Post-automotive legacy ===
In 1952, Graham-Paige dropped the "Motors" from its name and branched into real estate, and under the direction of Irving Mitchell Felt, bought such properties as the Roosevelt Raceway in New York, and in 1959, a controlling interest in the old Madison Square Garden (built in 1925). In 1962, the firm changed its name to the Madison Square Garden Corporation, which was later absorbed by Gulf and Western Industries. Currently, Madison Square Garden is part of Madison Square Garden Entertainment.

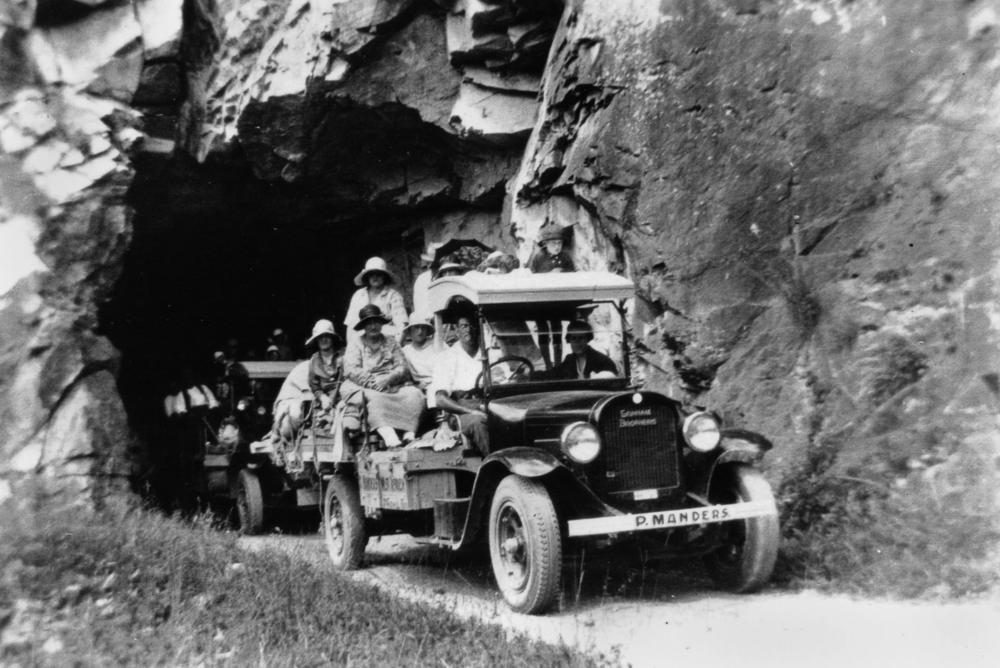
Graham Brothers truck, ca. 1925

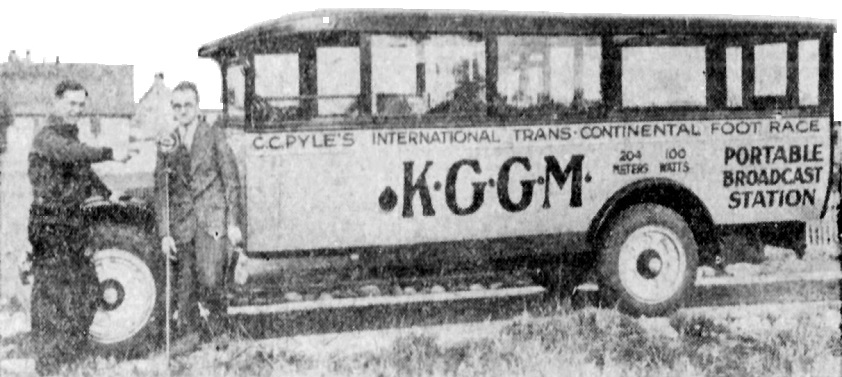
Portable radio station installed on a Graham school bus, 1928

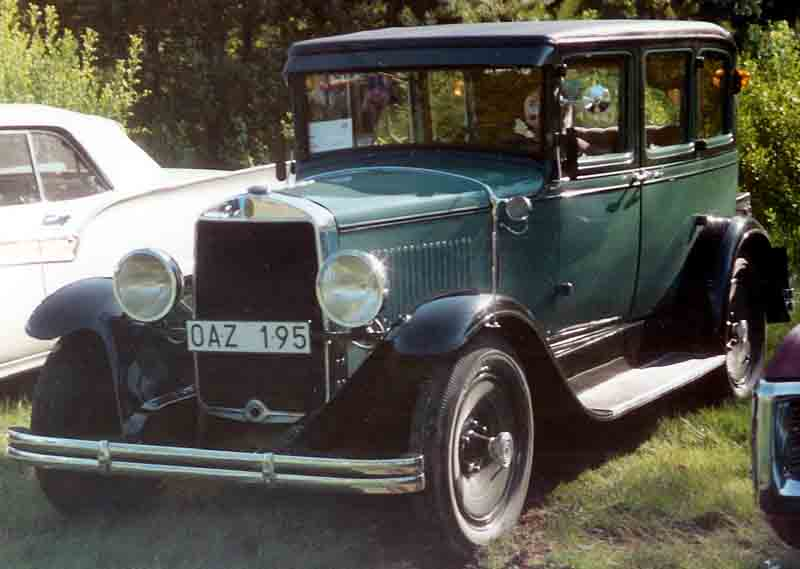
Graham-Paige Model 610 4-door Sedan, 1928

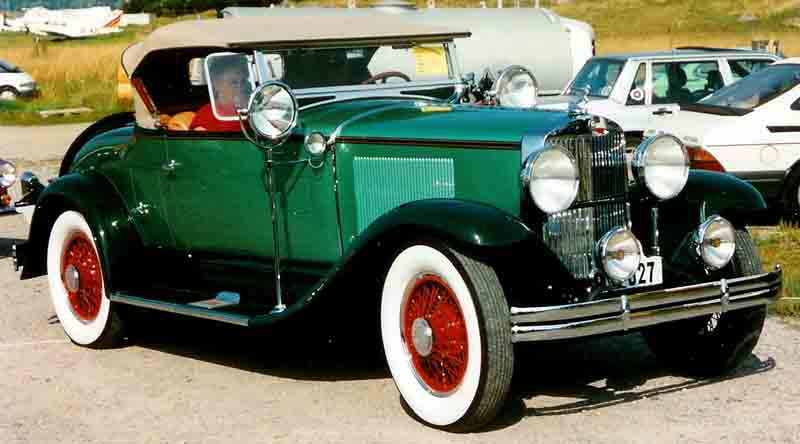
Graham-Paige Model 827 Roadster, 1929

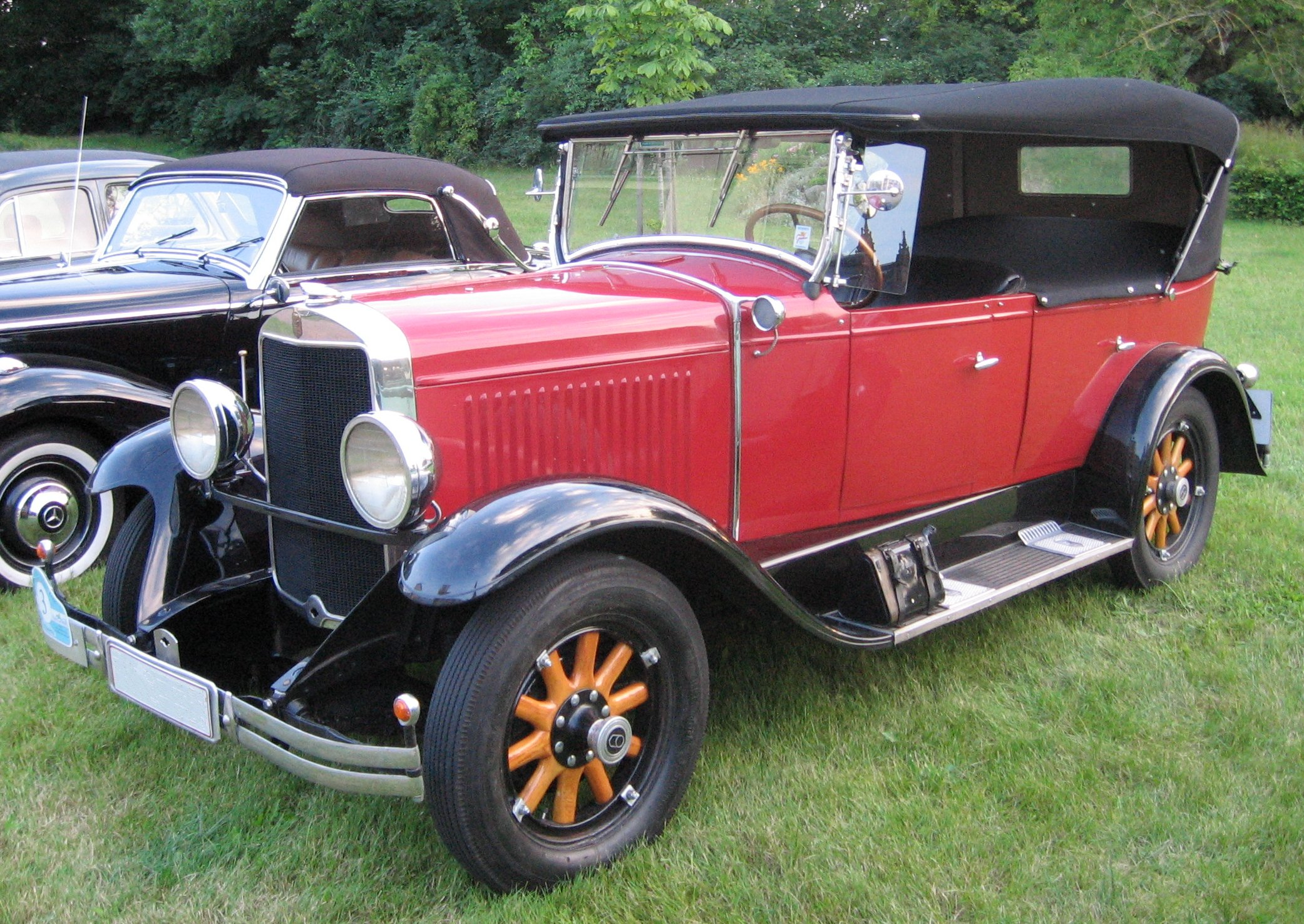
Graham Paige 612 Tourer, 1929

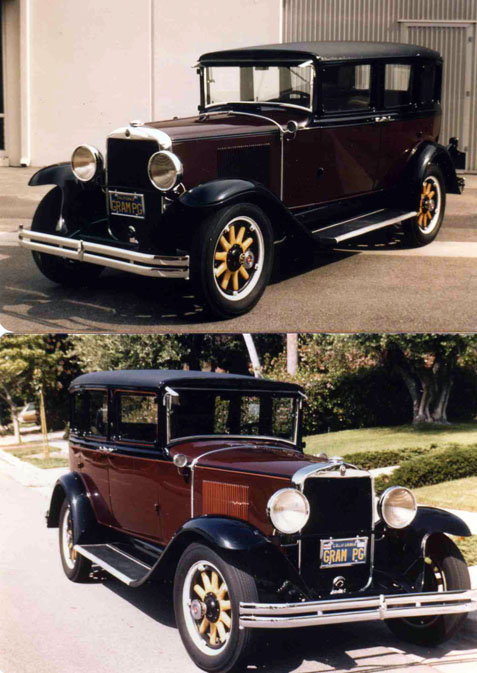
Restored 1929 Graham-Paige Model 612

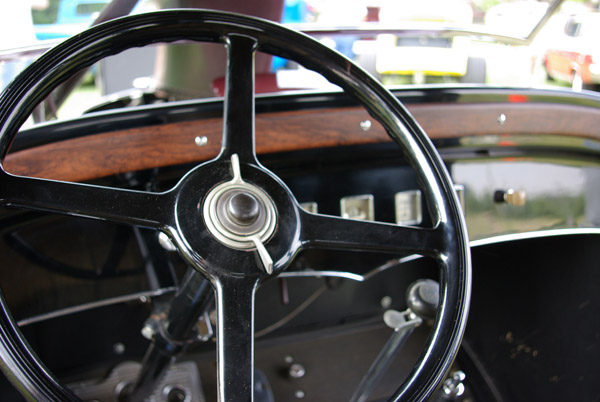
Steering column of a Model 613. One lever in the center controls the headlights, the other is the hand throttle.

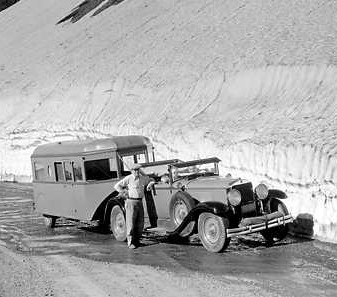
1929-30 Graham-Paige with early mobile camper trailer at Glacier National Park; December 1933.

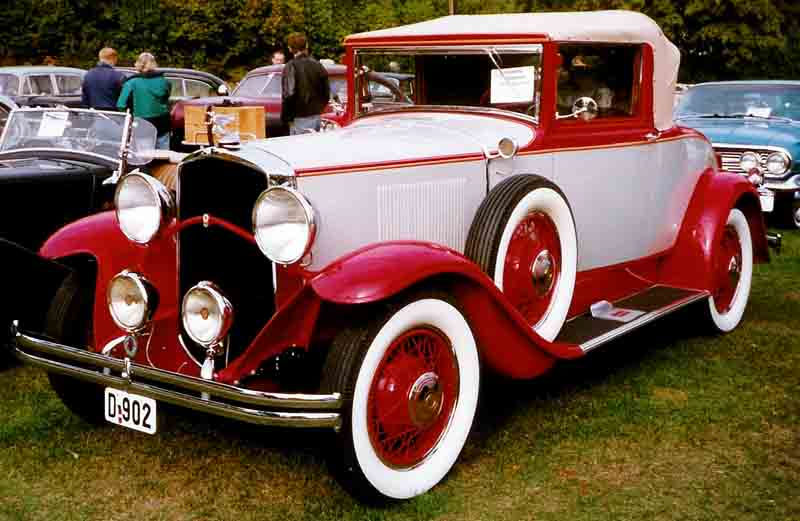
Graham Convertible Coupé, 1930

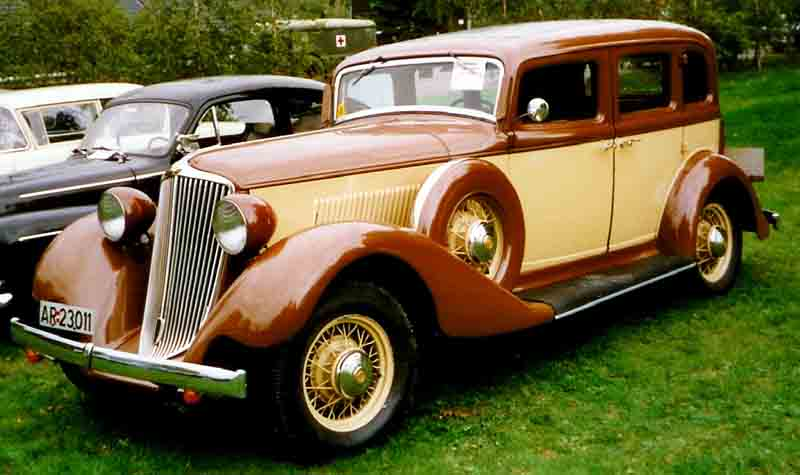
1932 Graham Bluestreak 4-door Sedan

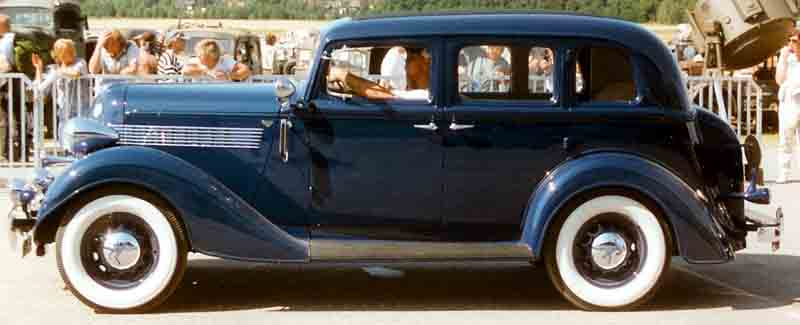
Graham Model 80A Crusader 4-door Touring Sedan, 1936

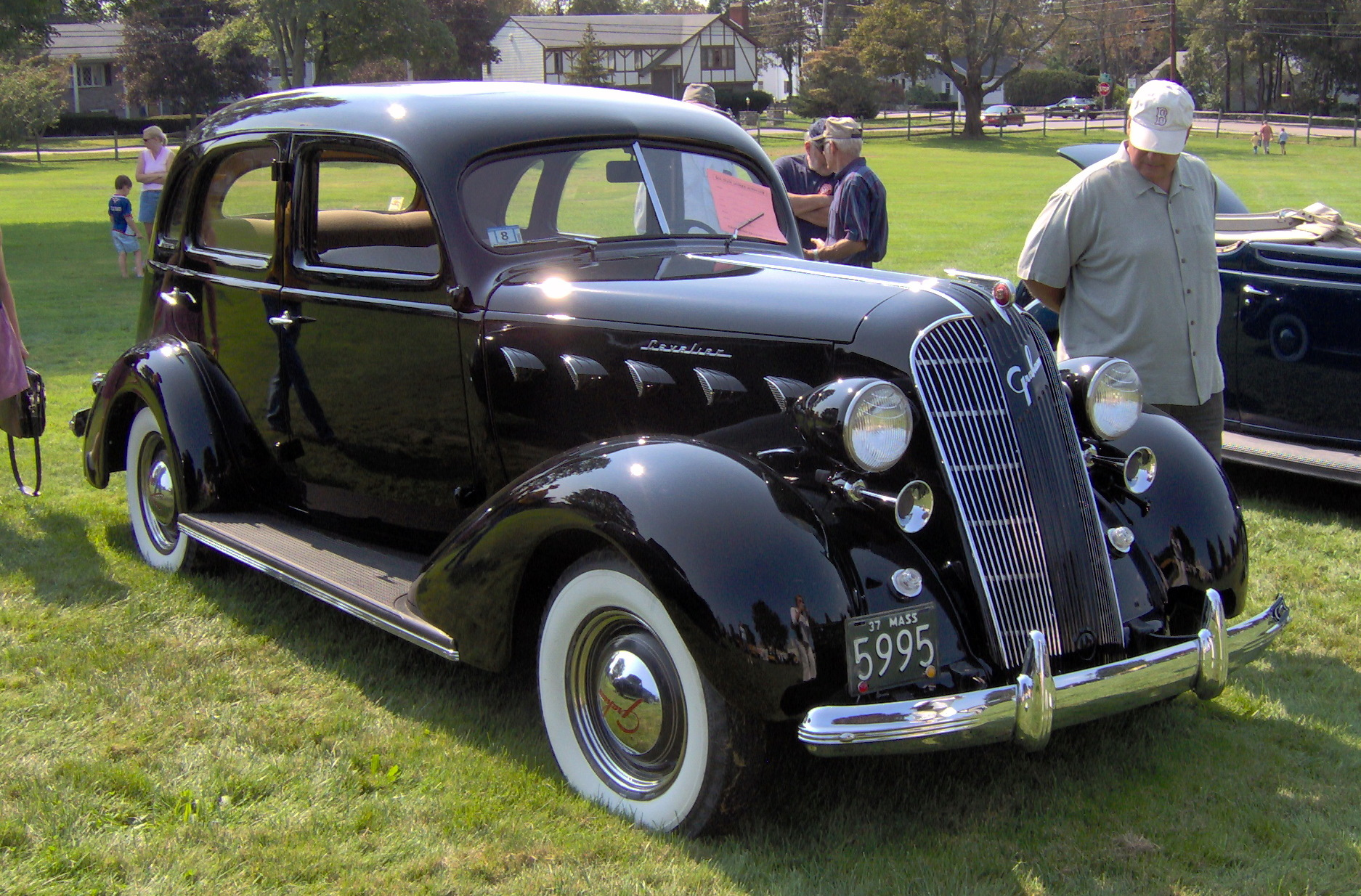
1937 Graham Cavalier

Graham-Paige Supercharger ambulance, Sydney, 1938

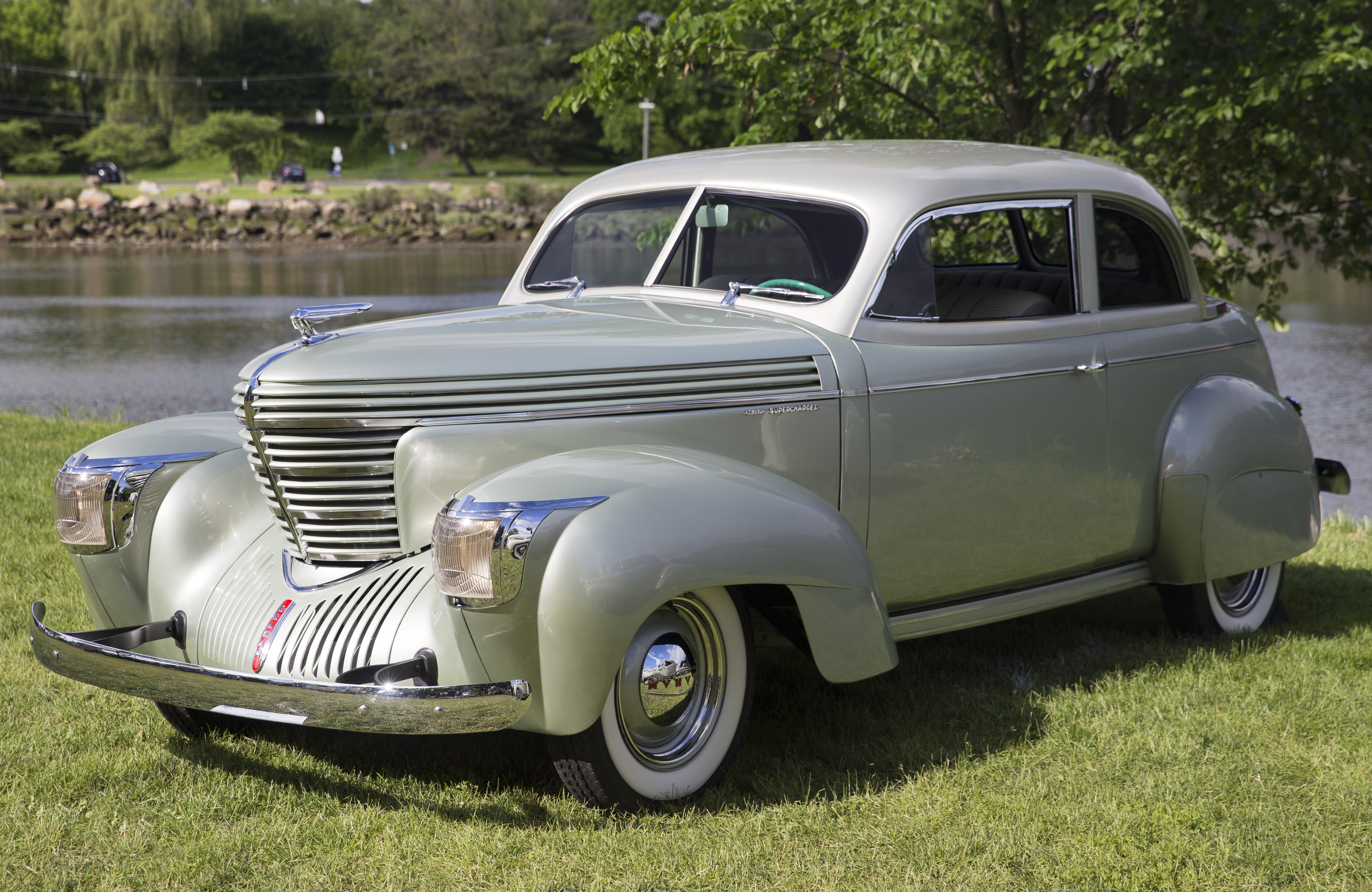
1939 Graham Model 97 Combination Coupe

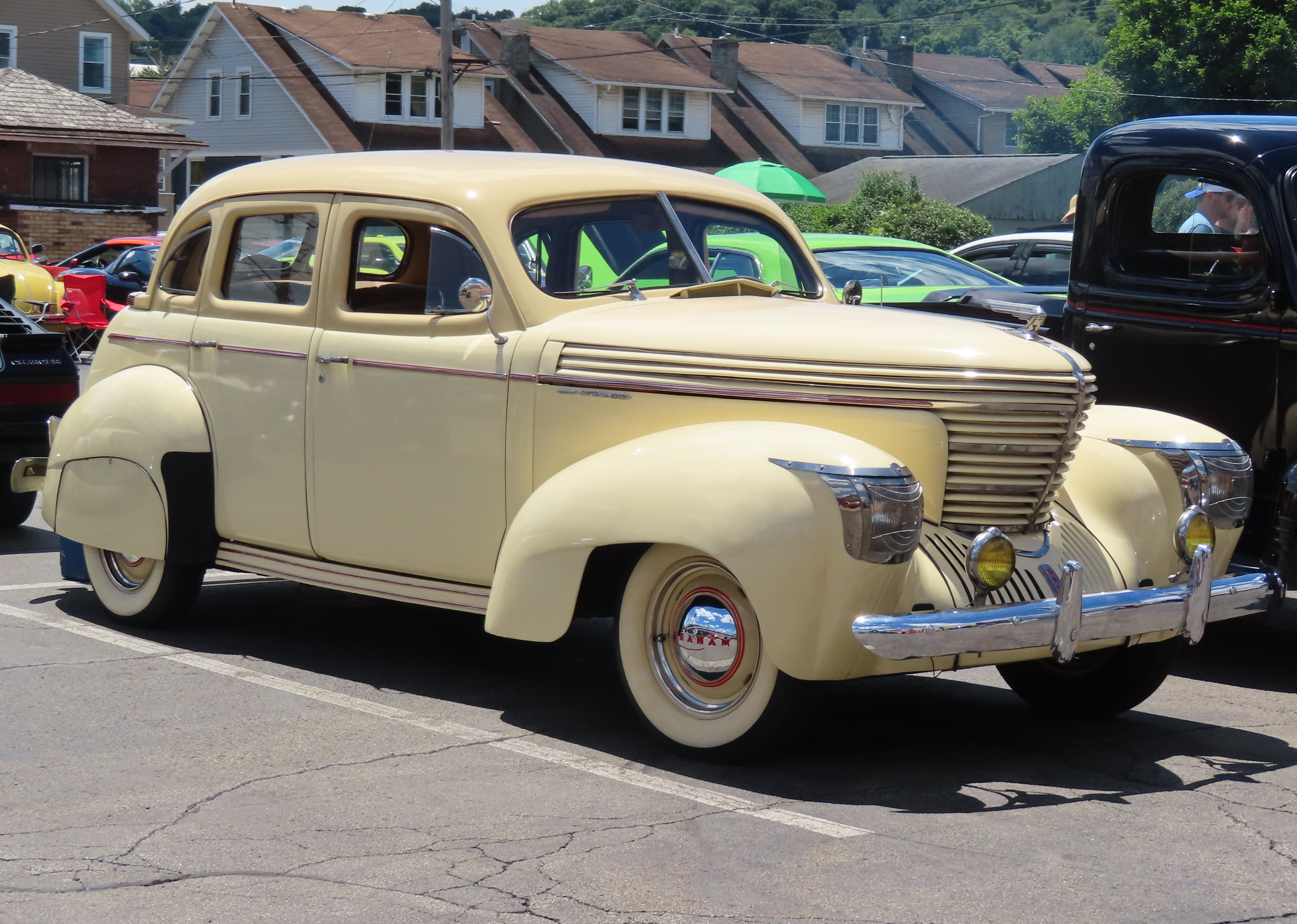
1939 Graham Model 97 Special Custom Supercharger 4-door sedan "Spirit of Motion", later nicknamed "Sharknose"

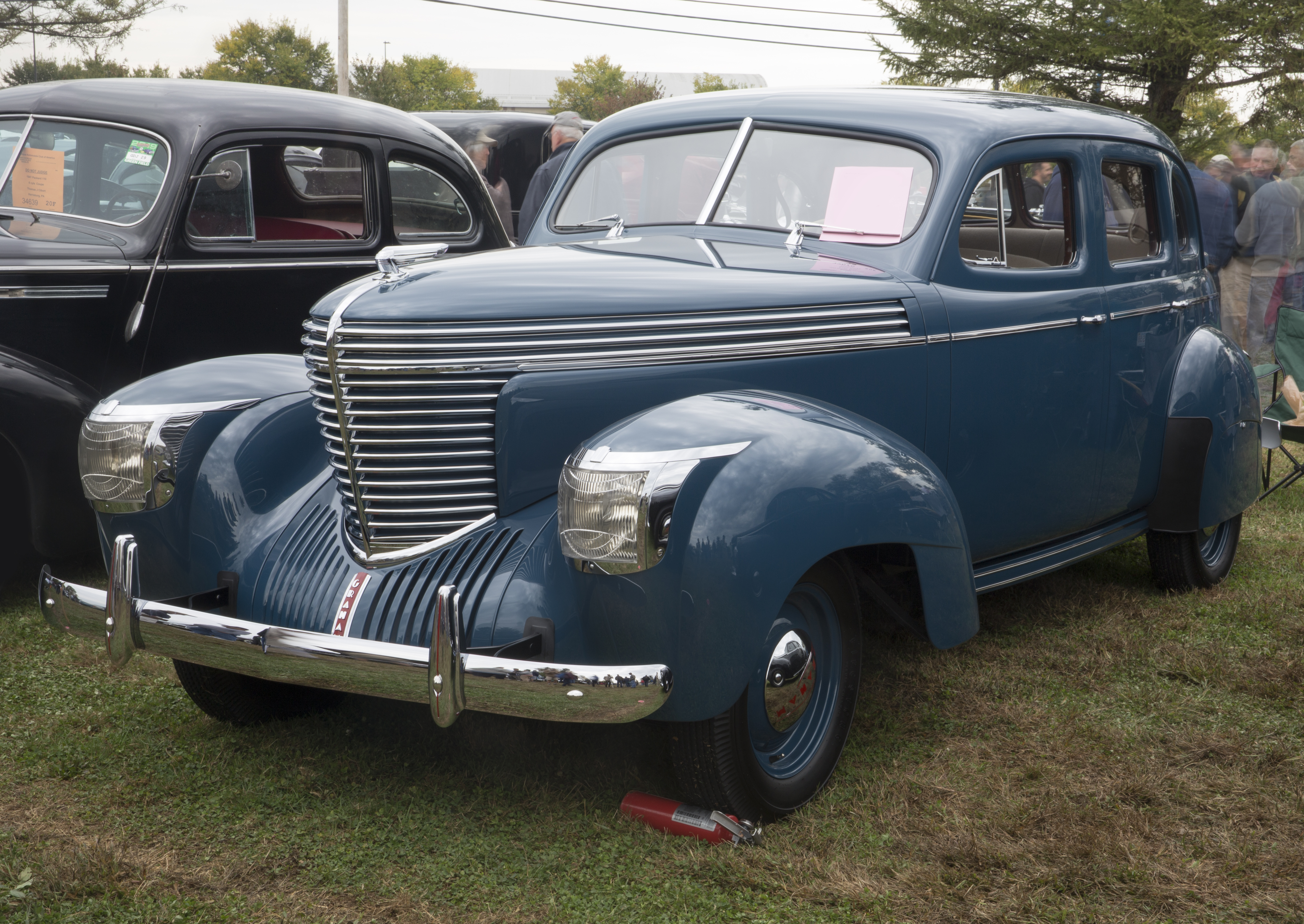
1940 was the last year for the "sharknosed" Graham (Model 107)

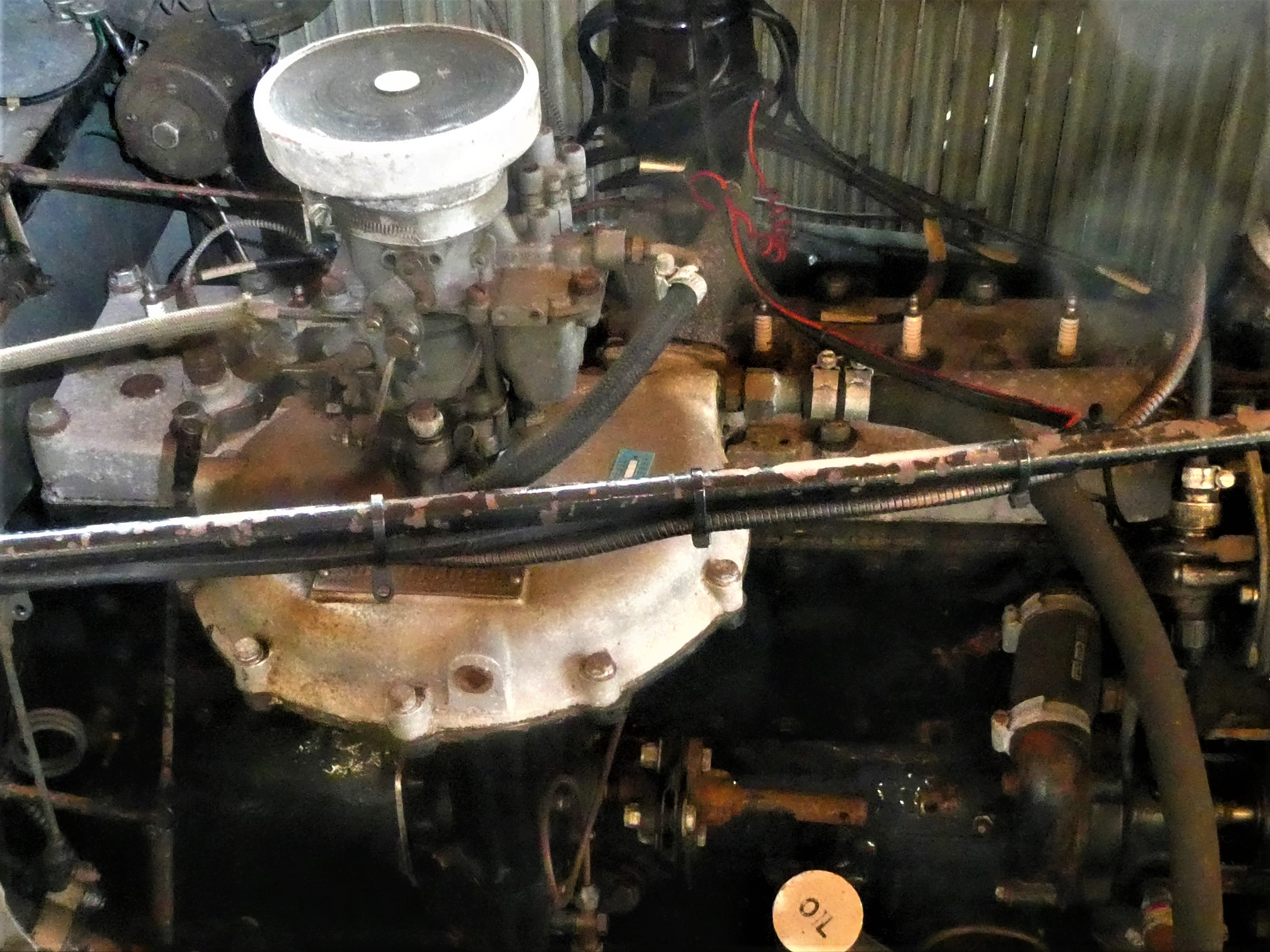
Graham 8 cyl. engine, top view dominated by centrifugal supercharger

== See also ==
- List of defunct automobile manufacturers of the United States
- Graham-Paige 835, introduced at the New York Auto Show in January 1928.
- Dodge Brothers Company
- Kaiser-Frazer
