= Auto Alley =

Automobile manufacturing in North America

The Auto Alley is an area of concentrated automobile manufacturing in North America, from southern Ontario to the Gulf of Mexico in the Southeastern United States.

== Location ==
Dozens of plants are in the area of highest concentration in southeastern Michigan (including the Motor City of Detroit), Ohio, and southern Ontario. The band includes neighboring states on the Great Lakes, and extends south to the Gulf of Mexico, generally between the Appalachian Mountains and the Mississippi River. From southern Michigan (including Detroit) to Alabama. As of 2015, though parts suppliers operate in most states (though disproportionately in Auto Alley), there is only one plant owned by an automobile manufacturer on the East Coast. Only a few automaker-owned plants are substantially west of the Mississippi River—in Kansas City, Texas, and coastal California. In Mexico, plants are concentrated near the Coahuila-Nuevo León border, and in central Mexican states.

== Overview ==
The Auto Alley is the region that includes both the suppliers and the manufactures of automobiles. The suppliers are clustered in the southern United States, and also in northern Mexico, while the manufactures are mostly clustered in the northern US midwest, especially Michigan, but also includes parts of Canada. Processed supplies are shipped from the south to the north to be manufactured into finished projects. Because of this arrangement, there are movements to move manufacturing towards the south, or move suppliers to the north, but these movements have so far produced limited results.
