= Automobile Alley Historic District (Mobile, Alabama) =

Historic district in Alabama, United States

- U.S. National Register of Historic Places
- U.S. Historic district
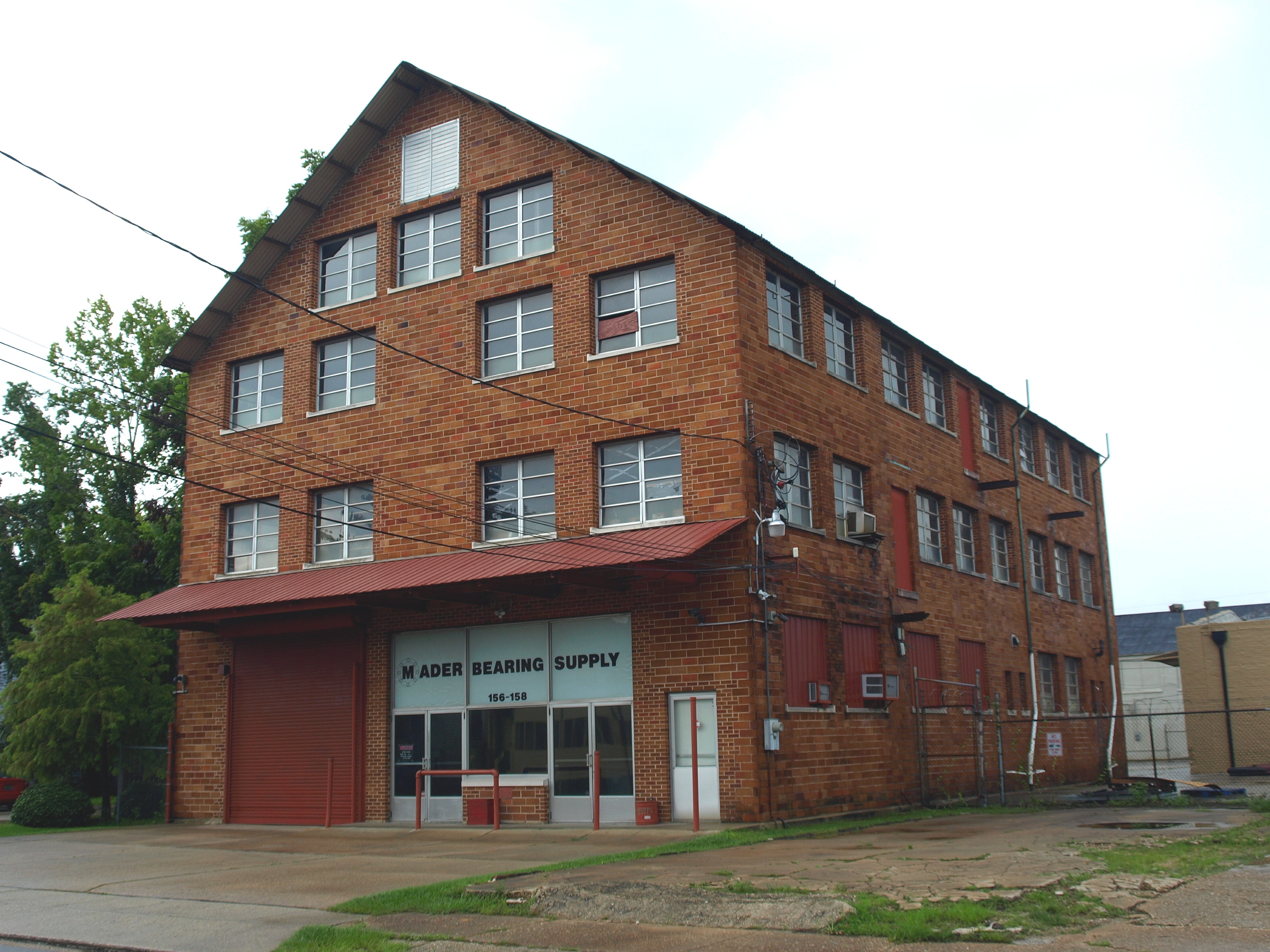

- Location within Alabama Location within the United States
- Location: Mobile, Alabama
- Coordinates: 30°41′34″N 88°03′01″W
- Area: 30 acres (12 ha)
- NRHP reference No.: 16000400 (original); 100009107 (increase)

Significant dates
- Added to NRHP: June 22, 2016
- Boundary increase: June 27, 2023

The Automobile Alley Historic District in Mobile, Alabama is a 30 acres (12 ha) historic district which was listed on the National Register of Historic Places in 2016.

When first listed, it included 156–157 N. Cedar, 108 N. Dearborn, 100–101 N. Franklin, 156 N. Hamilton, 163 N. Lawrence, 453–701 St. Anthony Sts. in Mobile. The district was enlarged in 2023.

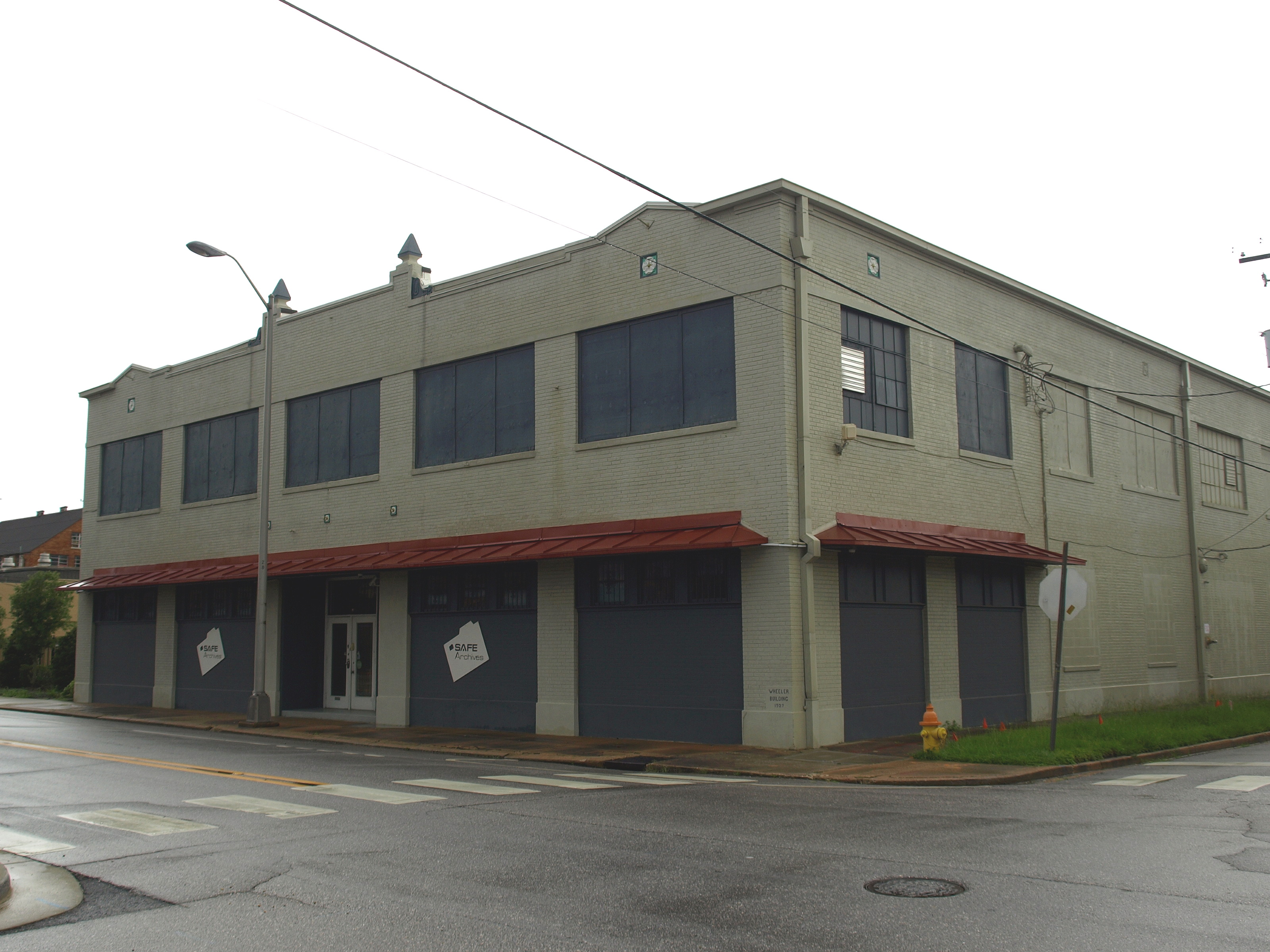

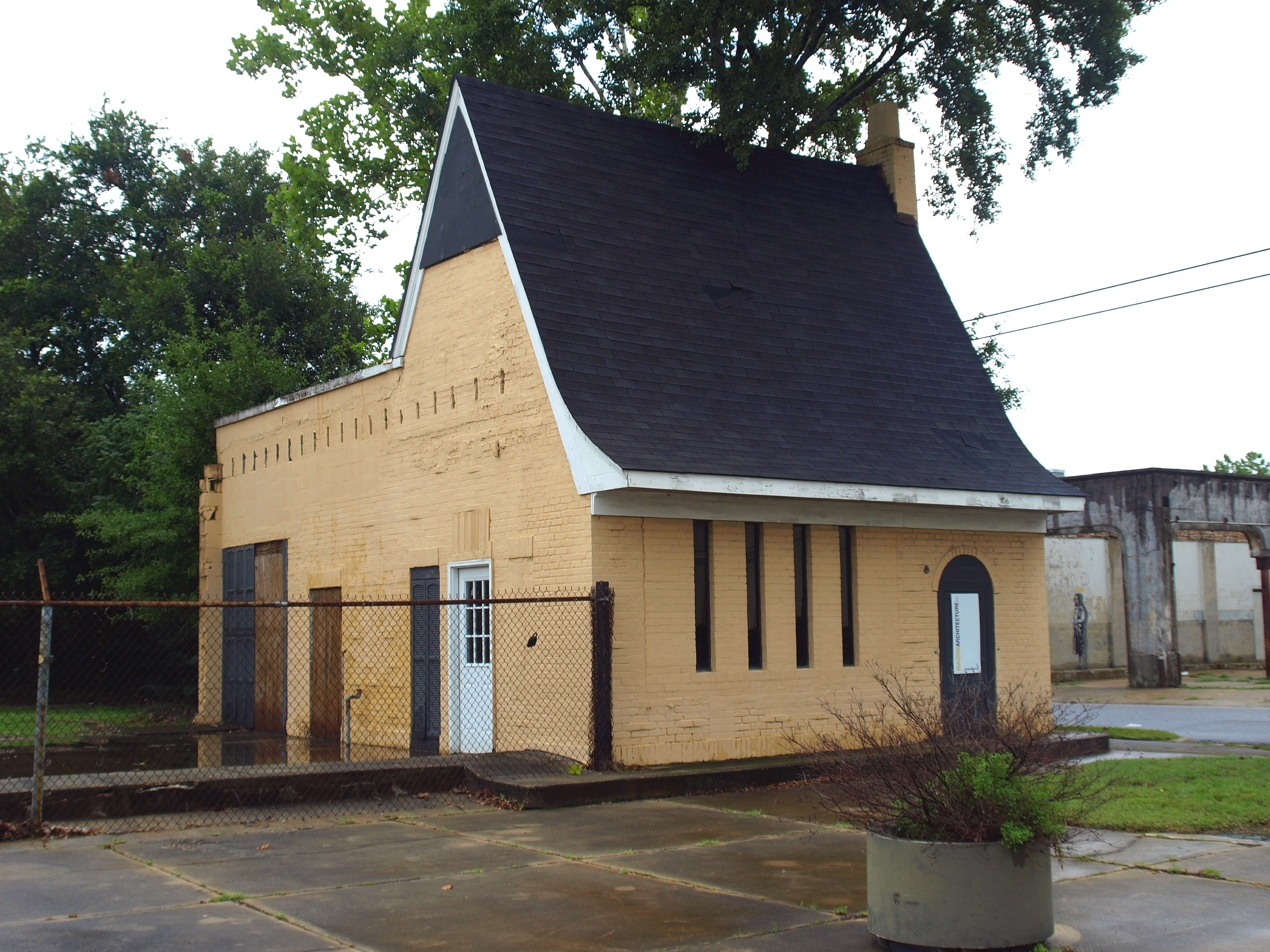

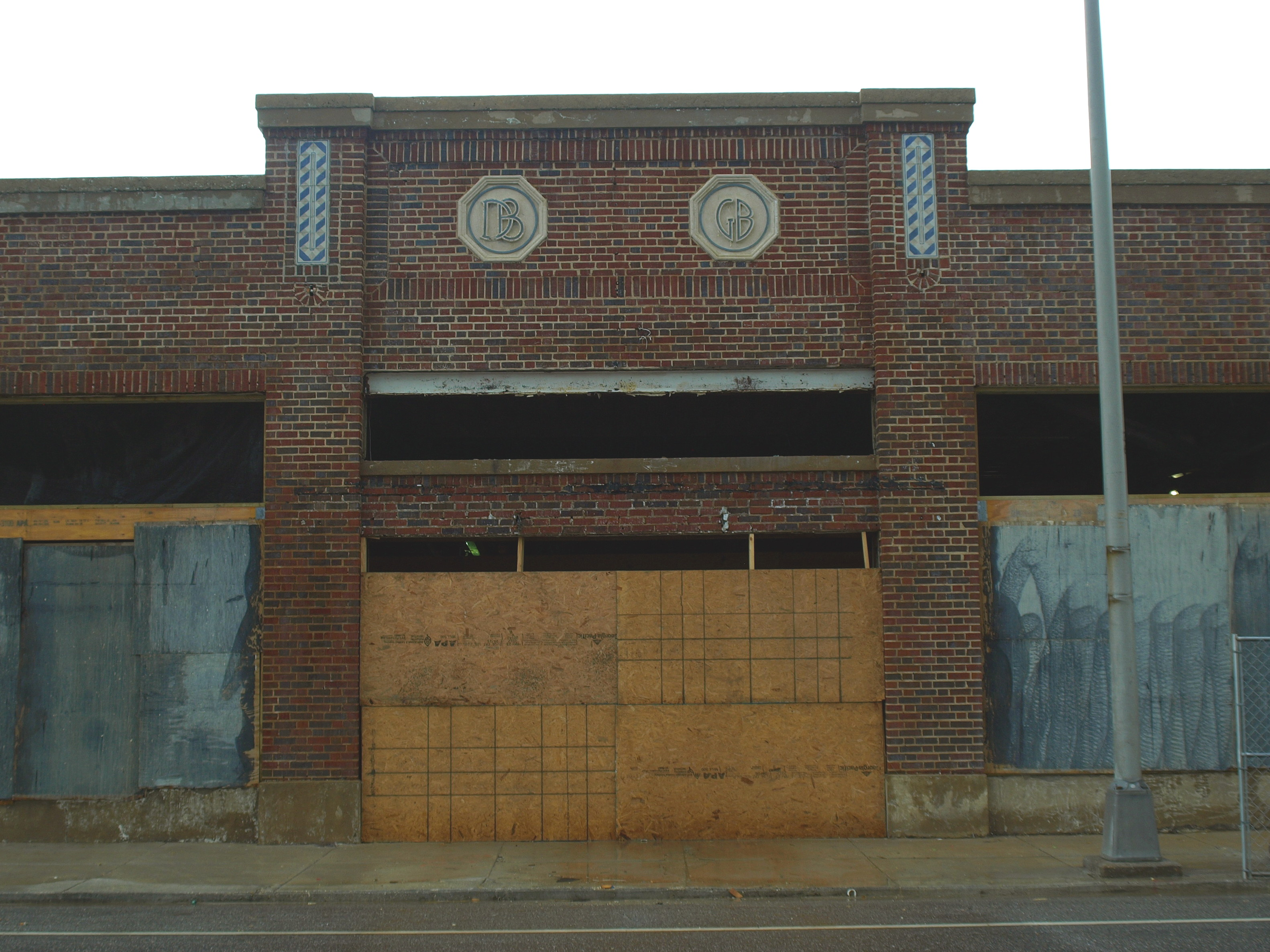
