= Paige automobile =

Defunct American motor vehicle manufacturer

Paige-Detroit Motor Car Company
- The Most Beautiful Car in America
- Type: Automobile Manufacturing
- Industry: Automotive
- Founded: 1908; 118 years ago
- Founder: Frederick Osgood Paige
- Defunct: 1928; 98 years ago
- Fate: Acquired by The Graham Brothers in 1927
- Successor: Graham-Paige Motors Corporation
- Headquarters: Detroit, Michigan, United States
- Key people: Fred O. Paige, Harry M. Jewett

Paige was a Detroit, United States–based automobile company, selling luxury cars between 1908 and 1927.

== History ==
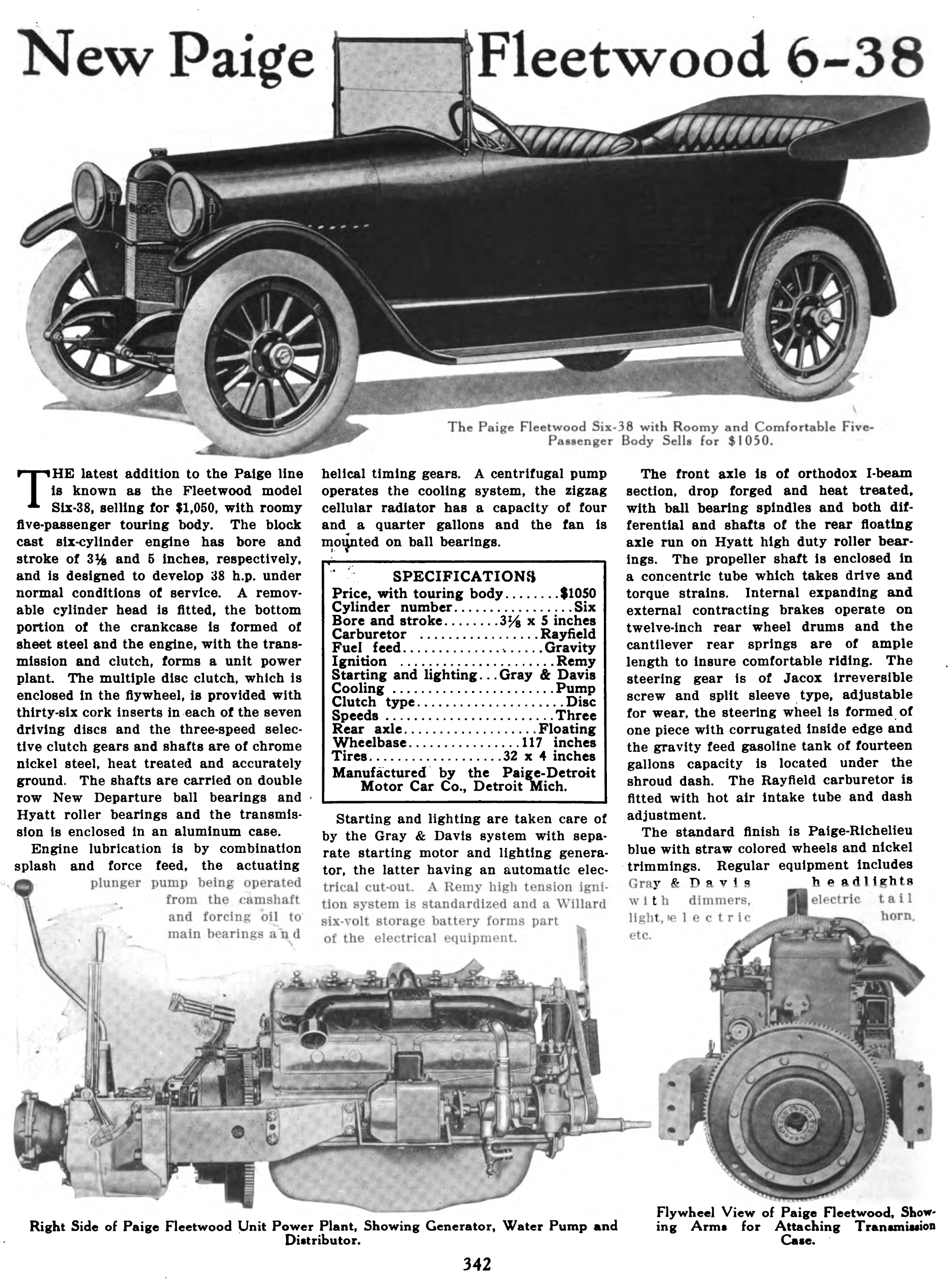
A new Paige model, the Fleetwood 6-38, in the journal Horseless Age, 1916

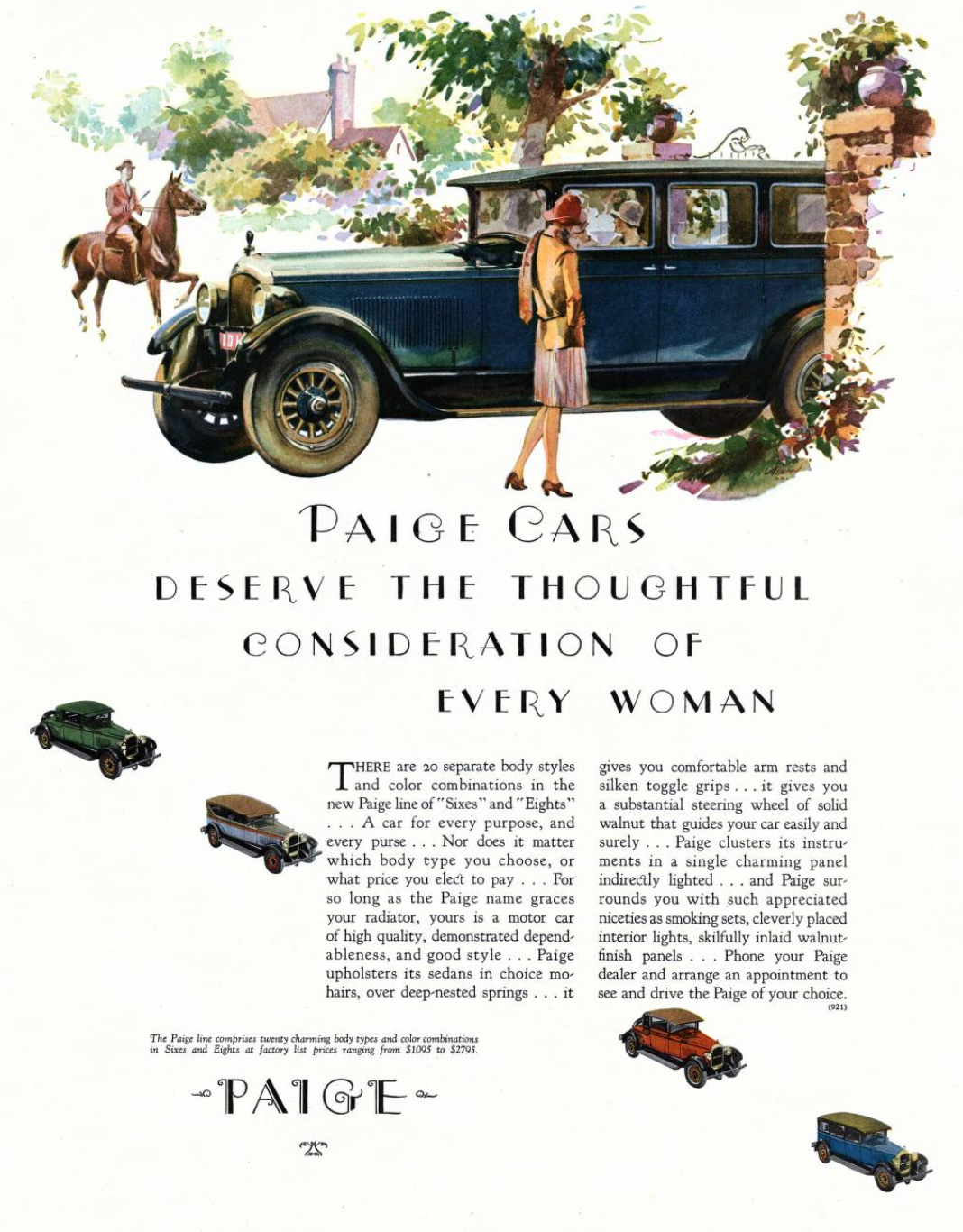
Paige (1927)

Paige-Detroit first began producing automobiles in 1908. The company's first car was a two-seat model powered by a 2.2-liter, three-cylinder, two-stroke engine. This model continued until 1910, when a four-stroke, four-cylinder engine design took over. In 1911, the company's name was shortened to Paige. A six-cylinder model was added to the range in 1914. Four-cylinder models were dropped in 1916, leaving a choice of 3.7- or 4.9-liter sixes. Another name change occurred in 1919, when models fitted with a Duesenberg engine were known as Paige-Linwood, and models fitted with a Continental engine were listed as Paige-Larchmont. A straight-eight engine was added to the sixes in 1927.

On January 21, 1921, a Paige 6-66 broke an American stock car speed record by covering a mile in 35.01 seconds at a speed of 102.8 miles per hour.

The most notable Paige produced was the 1922–1926 Daytona, a three-seat sports roadster with a six-cylinder engine. The vehicle was a traditional coupe, with the novel third seat extending from the side of the car over the near-side running board. Paige advertised the Daytona as being "The most beautiful car in America."

In 1927, four new model types were released. The last types under the name Paige are the 6-45, the 6-65, the 6-75, and the 8-85

Paige also produced a less-expensive range of cars between 1923 and 1926. These were sold as Jewetts and were named for the Paige company president H. M. Jewett. For 1927, the Jewett name changed to Junior Paige.

== Graham ownership ==
The Graham brothers bought the company on June 10, 1927. Joseph Graham became the new president, his brothers Robert and Ray serving as vice president and secretary-treasurer, respectively. The three, together with their father, also became directors of the company. The corporate name soon changed to Graham-Paige Motors Corporation. The market agreed, and automobile production rose from 21,881 in 1927 to 73,195 for the following year, when the cars became known as Graham-Paiges.

When the second series of 1930 cars was released (bringing out two series for a model year was widely practiced at the time), the name for the product (but not for the corporate name) changed to just Graham.

== Gallery ==
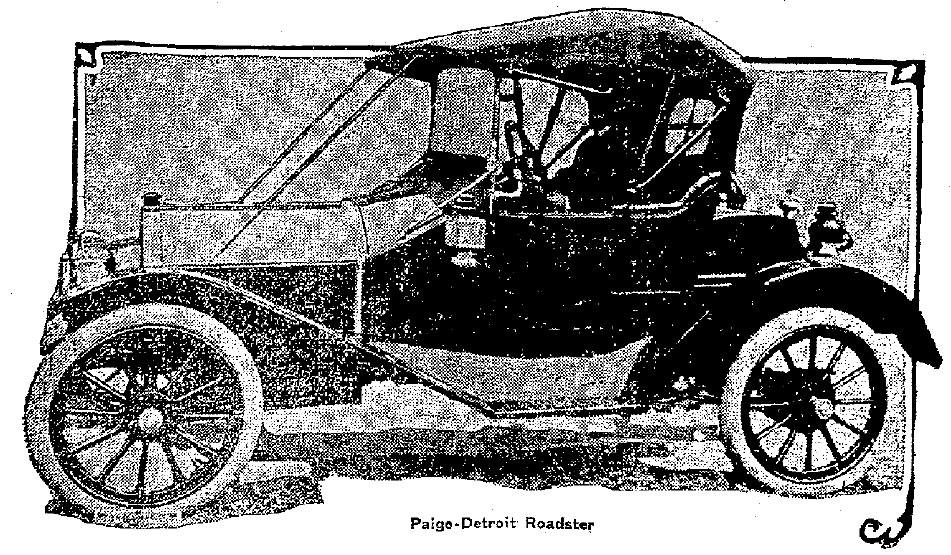
1911 Paige-Detroit roadster

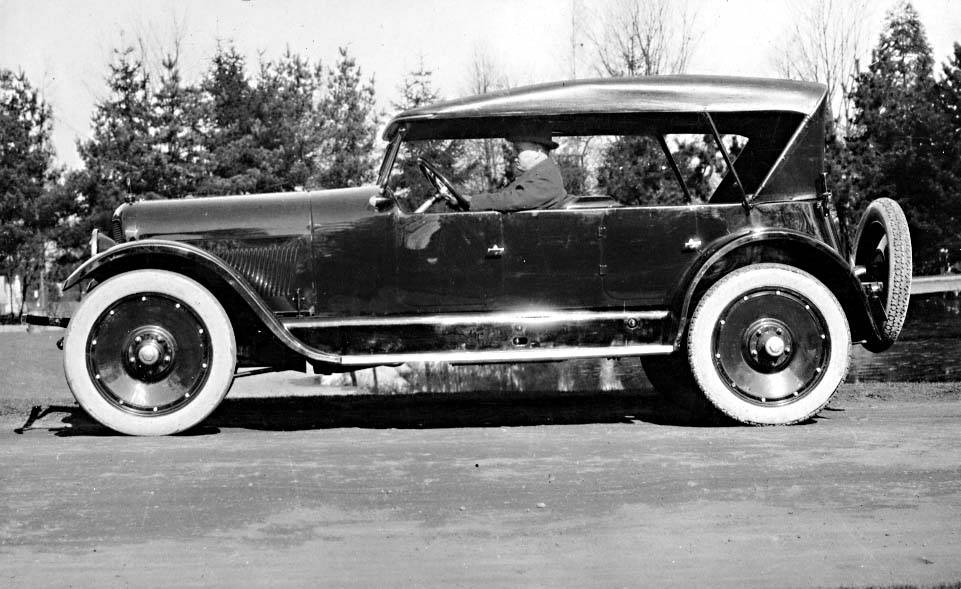
1920 Paige Touring Car

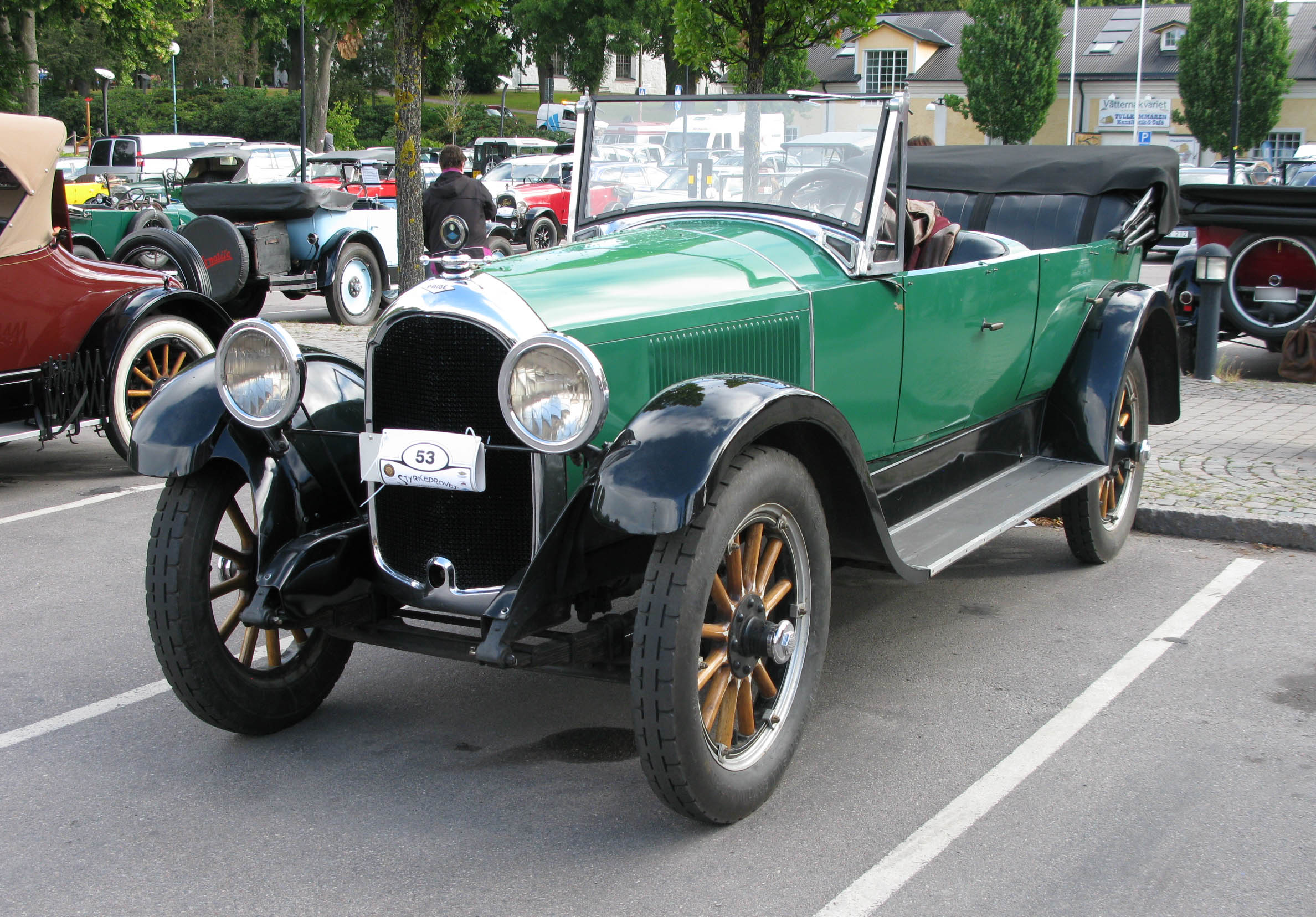
1921 Paige Touring Car

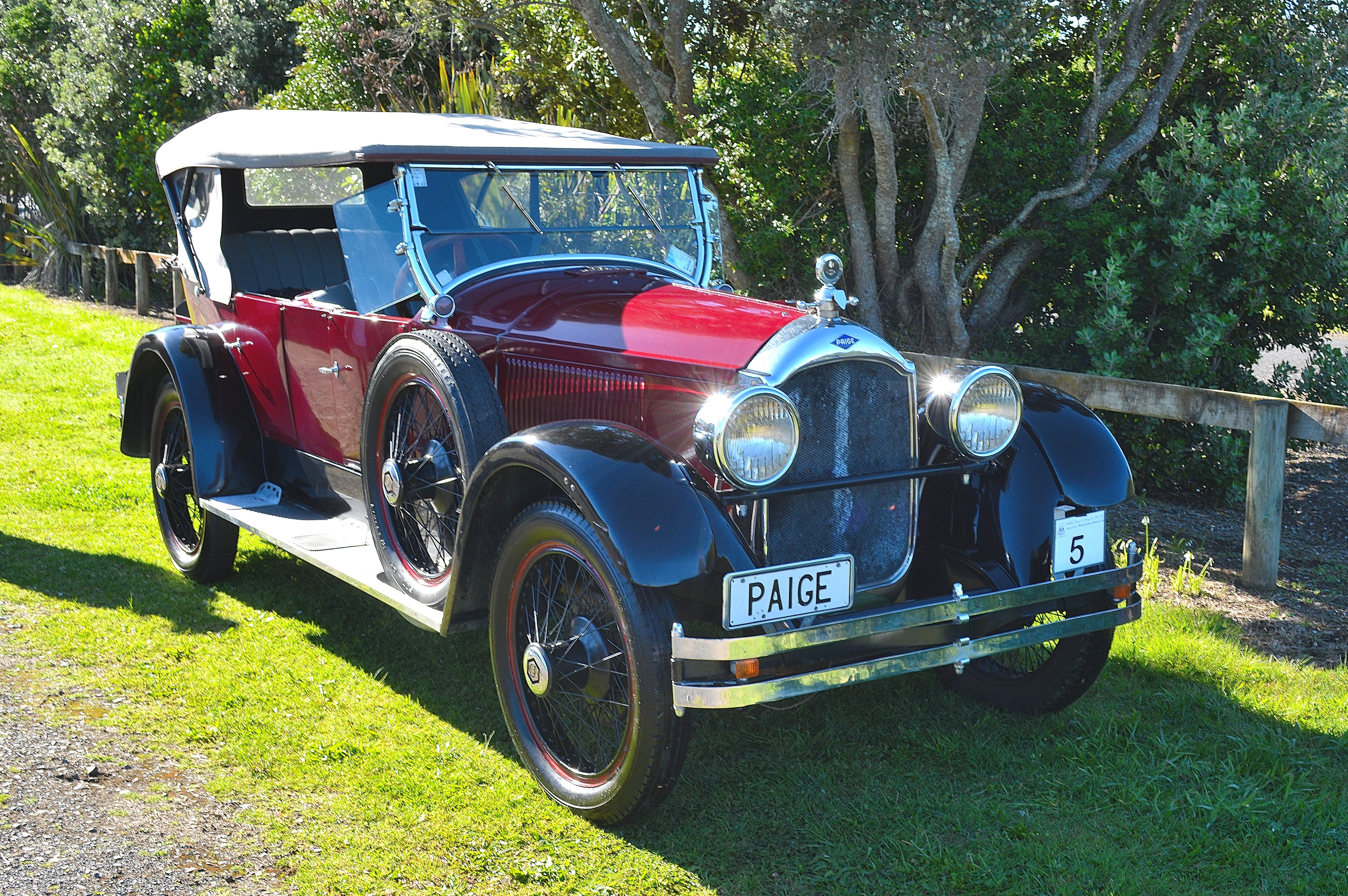
1922 Paige Daytona Tourer

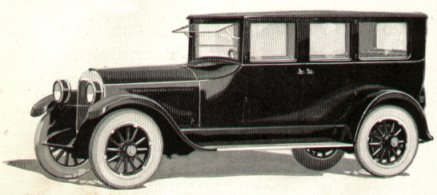
1922 Paige Sedan

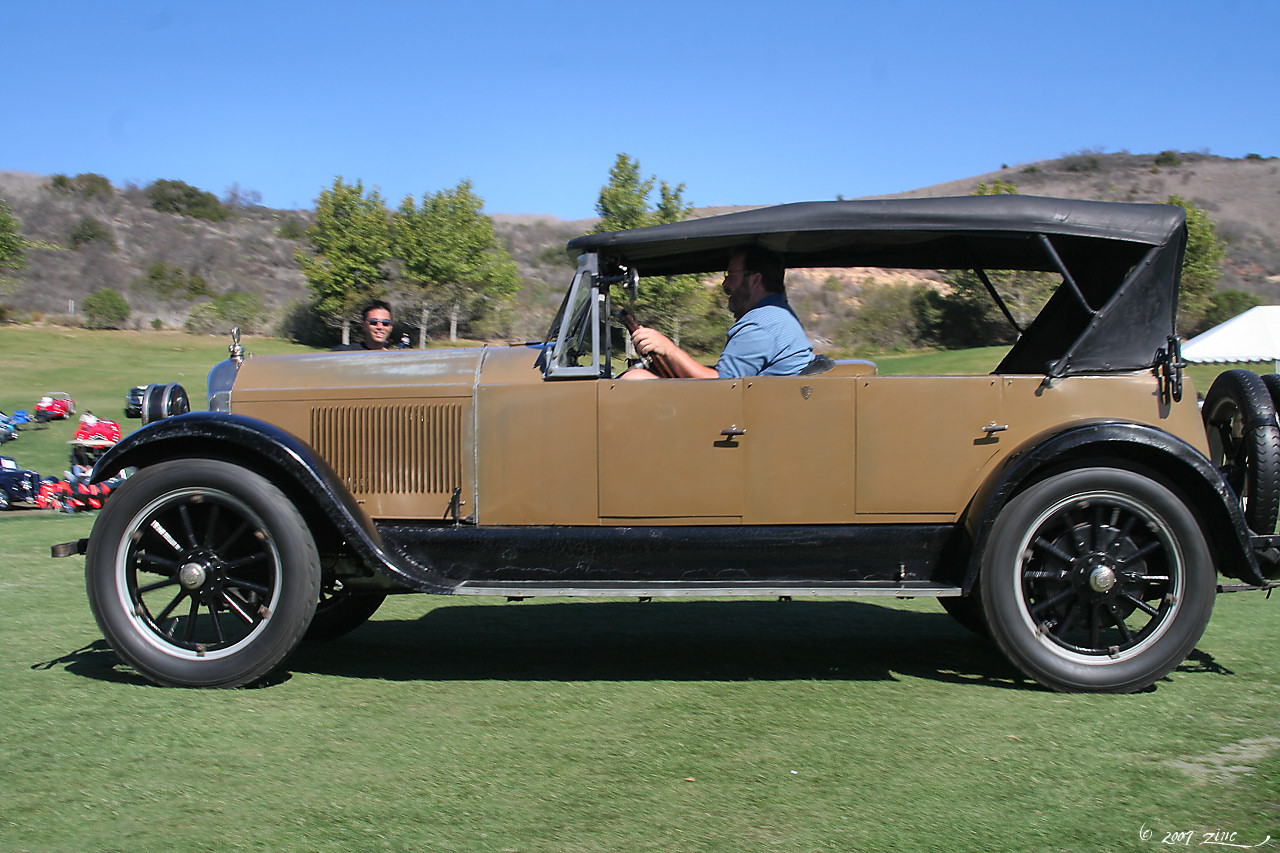
1922 Paige Larchmont II Sport Tourer

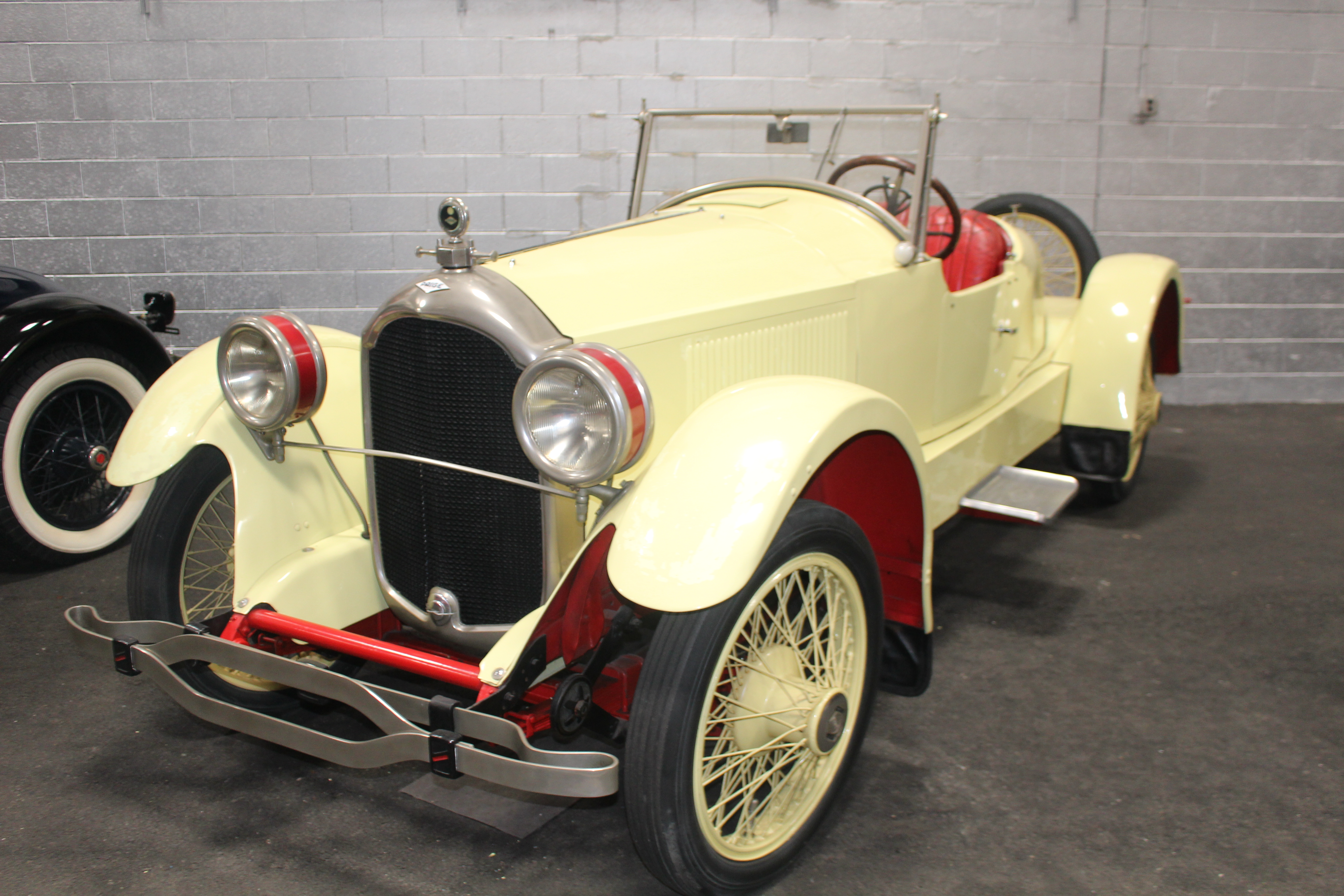
1922 Paige 6-66 Daytona Speedster

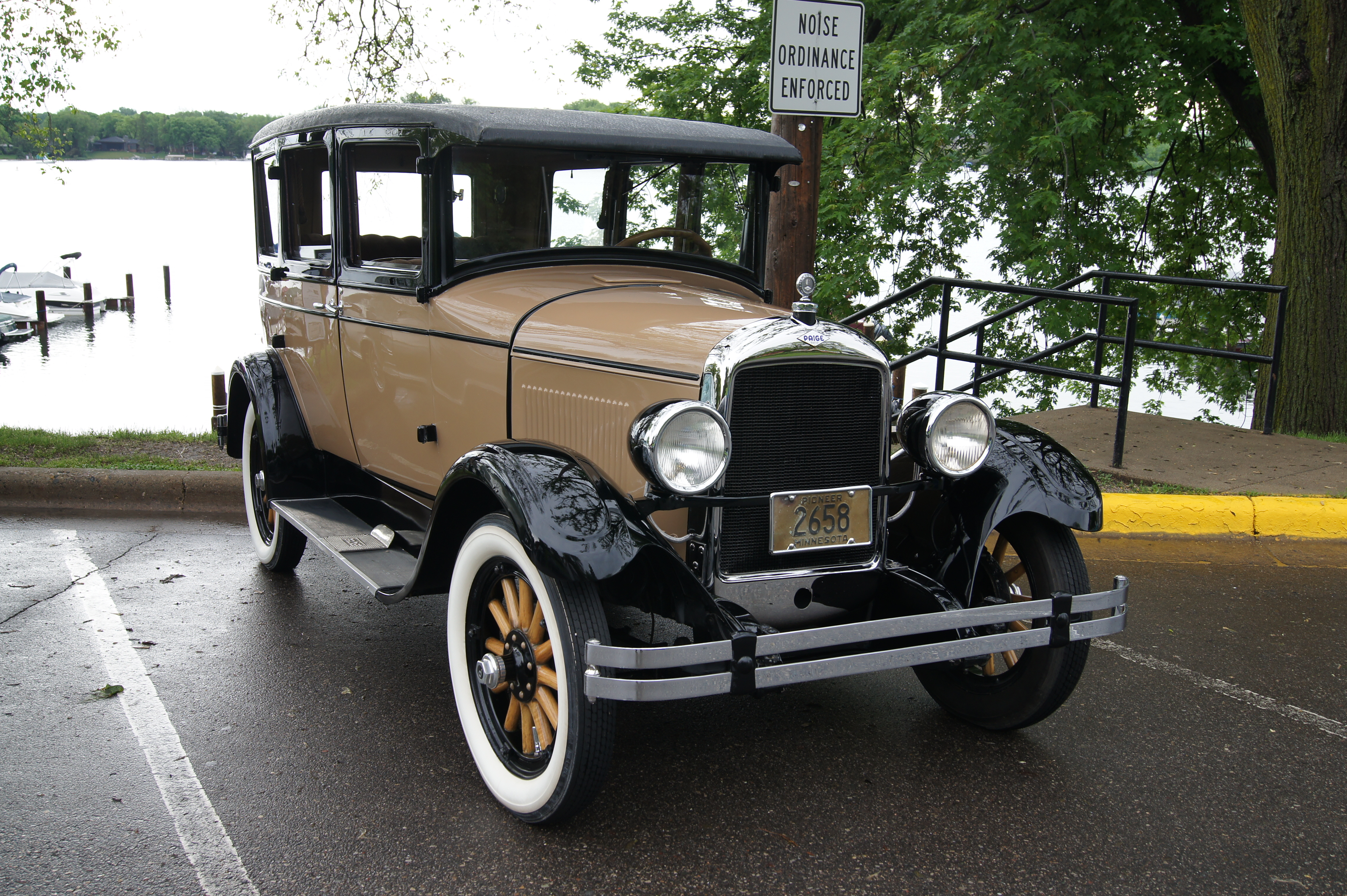
1927 Paige Model 6-45

== See also ==
- List of defunct United States automobile manufacturers
