= Standish-Sterling Community Schools =

School district in Michigan, United States

Address
- 3789 Wyatt Road Standish, Arenac County, Michigan, 48658; United States

District information
- Grades: Pre-Kindergarten-12
- Superintendent: Darren Kroczaleski
- Schools: 3
- Budget: $23,386,000 2022-2023 expenditures
- NCES District ID: 2632940

Students and staff
- Students: 1,483 (2024-2025)
- Teachers: 80.87 (on an FTE basis) (2024-2025)
- Staff: 211.11 FTE (2024-2025)
- Student–teacher ratio: 18.52 (2024-2025)

Other information
- Website: www.standish-sterling.org

Standish-Sterling Community Schools is a public school district in Central Michigan. In Arenac County, it serves Standish, Sterling, the townships of Adams, Deep River, Lincoln, Moffatt, and Standish, and parts of the townships of Arenac and Clayton. It also serves a small parts of Bourret Township in Gladwin County and Pinconning Township in Bay Couty.

The district's mascot is the panther. The school colors are navy blue and white with a tertiary color being gold.

== History ==
The first school in Standish was established in 1871. It burned down in 1914 and was rebuilt. For a period of time beginning in 1903, the Standish High School housed a normal school, or school for training teachers.

Standish and Sterling school districts, along with thirteen other districts in the area, consolidated in April 1957. Voters approved a bond issue to build a new Standish-Sterling Junior/Senior High School in January 1958. The new building opened in December 1959 and was briefly called Arenac Central High School until December 8, 1959, when the board of education formally recognized the name chosen by district voters. The new school was dedicated in May 1960.

The current Standish-Sterling Central Junior/Senior High School opened in fall 2001. Fanning Howey was the architect.

Standish-Sterling Central Elementary School was the previous Standish-Sterling Central High School from 1959 to 2001 and Standish-Sterling Middle School from 2001 to 2016. Sterling Elementary School in Sterling previously taught K-6 until 2017 when it converted to Preschool-K only.

In 2017, Standish Elementary School in Standish closed due to restructuring.

In 2017, Arenac-Eastern School began sending students to Standish-Sterling due to declining enrollment. On March 10, 2020, the vote passed by the three districts for Arenac-Eastern to be dissolved effective in June 2020 and split between Standish-Sterling Community Schools and Au Gres-Sims School District along M-65.

== Schools ==
Schools in Standish-Sterling Community Schools
School	Address	Notes
Standish-Sterling Central Junior/Senior High School	2401 Grove Road, Standish	Grades 7-12. Built 2001.
Standish-Sterling Central Elementary	3789 Wyatt Road, Standish	Grades 1-6. Built 1959.
Sterling Elementary	338 W. State Street, Sterling	Grades PreK-K
