= M-70 (Michigan highway) =

Former state highway in Michigan

M-70
- M-70 highlighted in red on a modern map

Route information
- Maintained by MSHD
- Length: 22.1 mi (35.6 km)
- Existed: c. July 1, 1919–c. July 1, 1960

Major junctions
- South end: M-76 near Sterling
- North end: M-55 near Prescott

Location
- Country: United States
- State: Michigan
- Counties: Arenac, Ogemaw

Highway system
- Michigan State Trunkline Highway System; Interstate; US; State; Byways
← M-69	→ M-71

M-70 was a state trunkline highway in the US state of Michigan. In the 1920s, the highway originally connected Sterling in southwest Arenac County with Prescott in southeast Ogemaw County. The route was later adjusted to run from M-76 near Sterling along a convoluted route through Maple Ridge and Prescott to end at M-55 in Nester's Corners. The highway was still a gravel road when the designation was removed by 1960.

== Route description ==
The final route used by M-70 followed Melita Road starting at M-76 northwest of Sterling. The highway ran north and crossed the Rifle River at a point between sections of the Ogemaw State Forest. The highway turned east on Main Street Road in Melita. From there, M-70 ran east on Main Street Road to the junction with Reed Road where it turned northward to Maple Ridge Road. The highway followed Maple Ridge Road east into Maple Ridge and turned north on Briggs Road. Crossing the Ogemaw–Arenac county line, the road name changed to Sage Lake Road into the village of Prescott. From there, it turned westerly on Greenwood Road through downtown Prescott, and north on Clark Road to end at M-55 one mile (1.6 km) west of Nester Corners, which is the intersection of South Sage Lake Road and M-55.

== History ==
M-70 was first shown on a state map on July 1, 1919, with the debut of the Michigan state trunkline highway system. The original routing was shown between M-76 at Sterling and M-55 at Prescott. In 1929, M-55 was shifted to run due east from Selkirk to US Highway 23 north of Whittemore. The segment east of Prescott to Whittemore was turned over to the county, but the section north of Prescott was added to M-70. This extended M-70 north to its terminus in Nester's Corners. The Michigan highway department sought to decommission M-70 in 1939 and returning its control to Ogemaw County, resulting in the removal of signs from the route. The signs were reinstalled in February 1939 after a number of local residents petitioned to reinstate the highway, as it provided southerly access to the village of Prescott during summertime tourist seasons. The designation was decommissioned by July 1, 1960. At the time, the highway was still a gravel road.

== Major intersections ==
County	Location	mi	km	Destinations	Notes
Arenac	Sterling	0.0	0.0	M-76 – West Branch, Standish	
Ogemaw	Richland Township	22.1	35.6	M-55 – West Branch, Tawas City	
1.000 mi = 1.609 km; 1.000 km = 0.621 mi
