= Maple Ridge =

Maple Ridge may refer to a location in North America:

Canada

- Maple Ridge, British Columbia, a city in Metro Vancouver
- Maple Ridge, Muskoka Municipal District in Lake of Bays, Ontario
- Maple Ridge, Stormont, Dundas and Glengarry United Counties in North Dundas, Ontario
- Maple Ridge, Edmonton, Alberta, a neighbourhood
- Maple Ridge, Calgary, Alberta, a neighbourhood

United States

- Maple Ridge, Michigan
- Maple Ridge, Ohio
- Maple Ridge, Oklahoma, a historic district in Tulsa

== See also ==
- Maple Ridge Township (disambiguation)
- Maple Ridge Wind Farm, New York
