= Turner =

Turner may refer to:

== People and fictional characters ==
- Turner (surname), a common surname, including a list of people and fictional characters with the name
- Turner (given name), a list of people with the given name
- One who uses a lathe for turning

== Places ==
=== Australia ===
- Turner, Australian Capital Territory
- Turner River, Western Australia

=== Canada ===
- Turner, Ontario

=== United States ===
- Turner, Mississippi County, Arkansas
- Turner, Phillips County, Arkansas
- Turner, former name of Tuttle, California
- Turner, Indiana
- Turner, Kansas
- Turner, Maine, a New England town
  - Turner (CDP), Maine, within the town of Turner
- Turner, Michigan
- Turner, Montana
- Turner, Oregon
- Turner, Washington
- Turner, West Virginia
- Turner Air Force Base, outside Albany, Georgia
- Turner County, Georgia
- Turner County, South Dakota

== Businesses ==
- Turner Broadcasting System, part of WarnerMedia, managed a collection of cable networks and properties
  - TBS (American TV channel), a channel owned by Turner Broadcasting System (now owned by Warner Bros. Discovery Networks U.S.); originally an abbreviation for its parent company
  - TNT (American TV network) a channel owned by Turner Broadcasting System (now owned by Warner Bros. Discovery Networks U.S.); originally an abbreviation for "Turner Network Television"
  - Turner Classic Movies (TCM), a channel formerly owned by Turner Broadcasting system; now owned by its sister company, Warner Bros. Entertainment
- Turner Entertainment Co., a media company founded by Ted Turner
  - Turner Home Entertainment, a home media distribution division of Turner Entertainment Co.
  - Turner Pictures, a former production company division of Turner Entertainment Co.
  - Turner Feature Animation, a former animated film production company division of Turner Entertainment Co.
  - Turner Program Services, a former syndication arm of Turner Broadcasting
- Turner Sports Cars, a British specialist sports car manufacturer
- Turner Manufacturing Company, a British engineering company that made the Turner-Miesse steam car, Turner diesel, and Turner winch
- Turner Construction, a New York City-based construction company
- Turner Suspension Bicycles, an American bicycle frame manufacturer
- Turner Publishing Company, an American independent book publisher based in Nashville, Tennessee

== Other uses ==
- USS Turner, several American naval ships
- Turner (crater), a small lunar impact crater near the Moon's equator
- Turner Prize, an annual prize presented to a British visual artist, named after English painter J. M. W. Turner
- Turner Museum of Glass
- Turner River Site, an archaeological site in Florida
- Turner Stadium, a football (soccer) stadium in Be'er Sheva, Israel
- Turner, a 1994 verse novel by David Dabydeen
- A kitchen utensil closely related to a spatula

== See also ==
- Turner Falls
- Turner Glacier
- Turner Hills
- Turner syndrome
- Turner Township (disambiguation)
- Turner Valley
- Turners, German Americans organized in athletic and political gymnastic unions
- Turners, Missouri
- Turners Hill, a village in West Sussex, England
- Turners Hill, West Midlands, England, the highest hill in the county
