= Turner Township =

Turner Township may refer to:

- Turner Township, Arenac County, Michigan
- Turner Township, Aitkin County, Minnesota
- Turner Township, Carter County, Oklahoma
- Turner Township, McIntosh County, Oklahoma
- Turner Township, Turner County, South Dakota, in Turner County, South Dakota

== See also ==
- Turner (disambiguation)
