= Maple Ridge, Michigan =

- Unincorporated community
- Location within the state of Michigan
- Coordinates: 44°08′31″N 83°55′39″W
- Country: United States
- State: Michigan
- County: Arenac
- Townships: Clayton and Mason
- Elevation: 807 ft (246 m)
- Time zone: UTC-5 (Eastern (EST))
  - Summer (DST): UTC-4 (EDT)
- ZIP code(s): 48766
- Area code: 989
- GNIS feature ID: 631483

Maple Ridge is an unincorporated community in Arenac County within Clayton Township and Mason Township at 44°08′31″N 83°55′39″W, about twelve miles north of Standish. A post office operated here from December 4, 1873 until June 14, 1919. As an unincorporated community, Maple Ridge has no defined area or population statistics.
