= Mason Township, Michigan =

Mason Township is the name of some places in the U.S. state of Michigan:

- Mason Township, Arenac County, Michigan
- Mason Township, Cass County, Michigan

== See also ==
- Mason, Michigan, a city in Ingham County
