= Twining, Michigan =

- Village
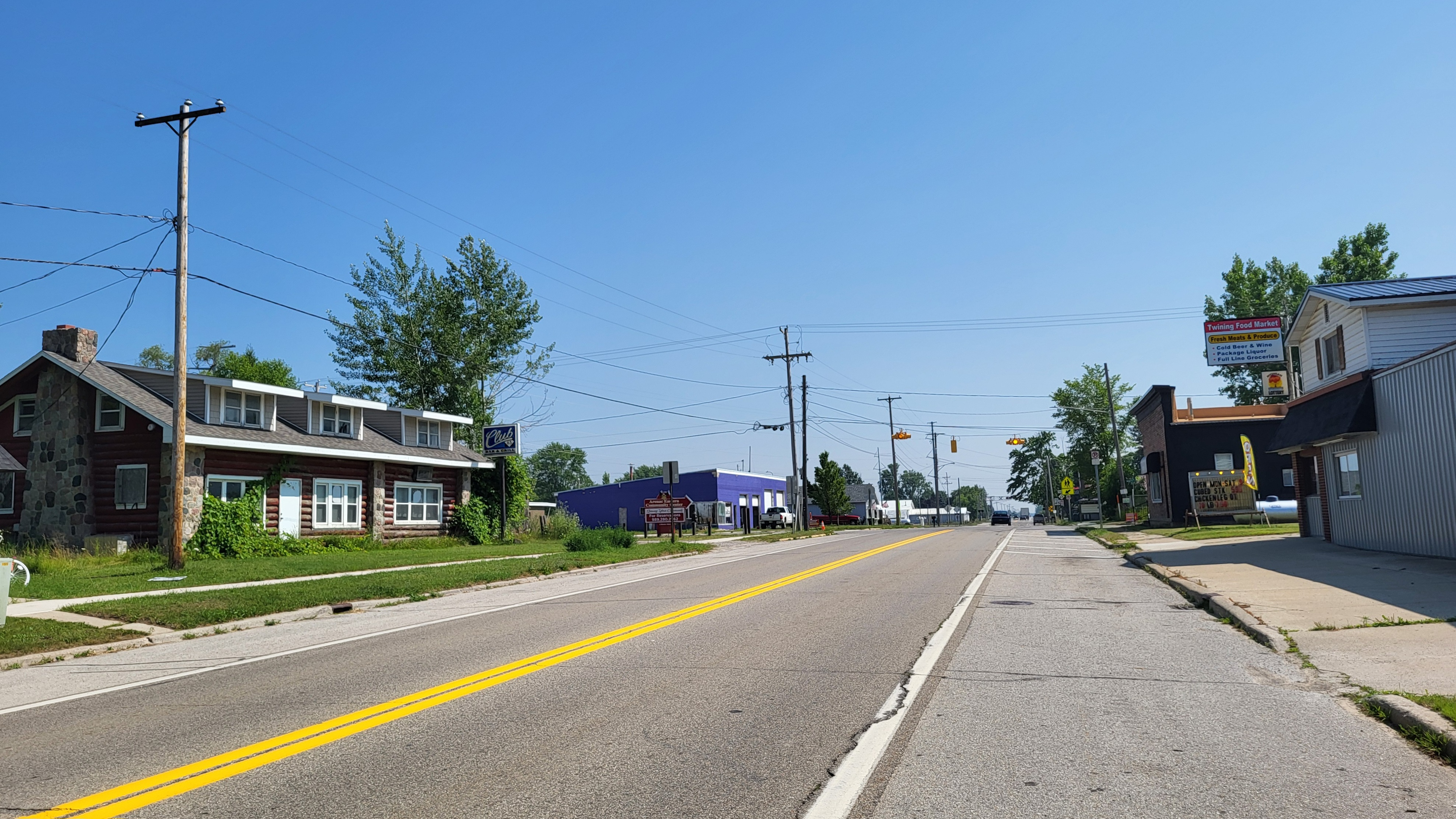
- Looking south along State Street (M-65)

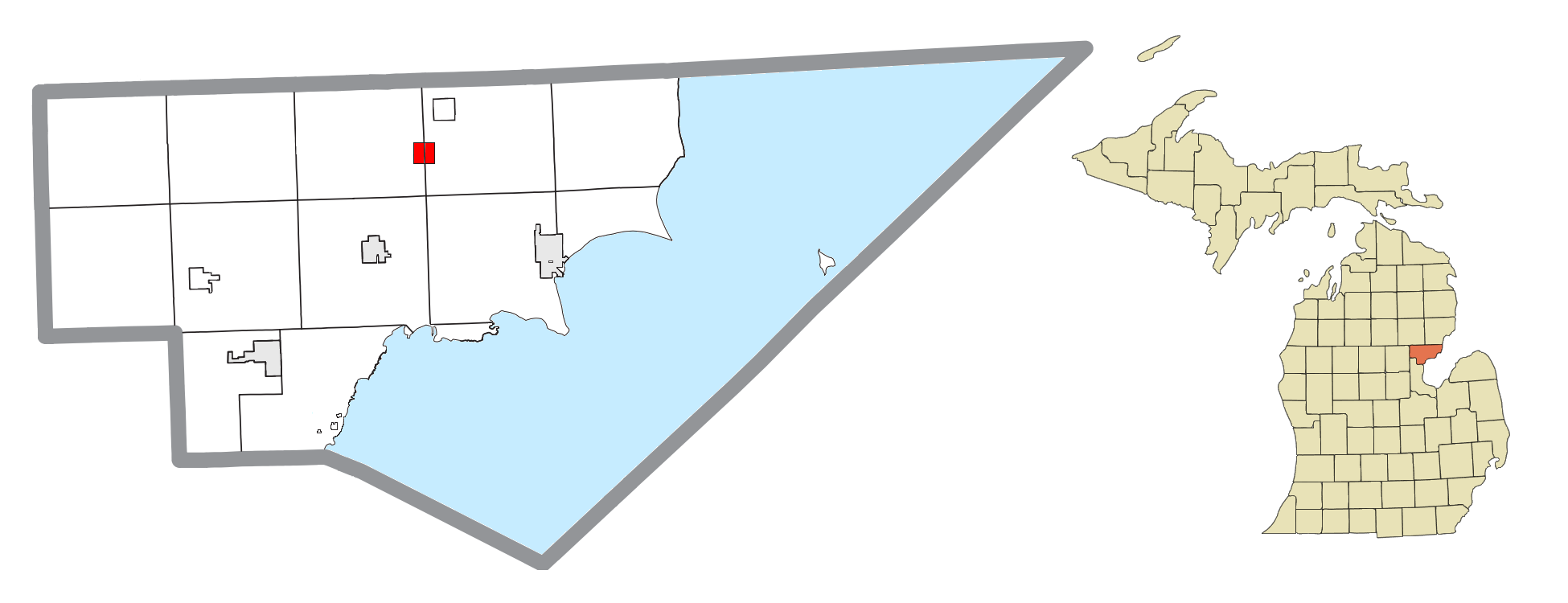
- Location within Arenac County

- Location within the state of Michigan Location within the United States
- Coordinates: 44°06′46″N 83°48′24″W
- Country: United States
- State: Michigan
- County: Arenac
- Townships: Mason and Turner

Area
  - Total: 0.97 sq mi (2.52 km^{2})
  - Land: 0.97 sq mi (2.52 km^{2})
  - Water: 0 sq mi (0.00 km^{2})
- Elevation: 640 ft (195 m)

Population (2020)
  - Total: 130
  - Density: 133.9/sq mi (51.69/km^{2})
- Time zone: UTC-5 (Eastern (EST))
  - Summer (DST): UTC-4 (EDT)
- ZIP code(s): 48766
- Area code: 989
- FIPS code: 26-81020
- GNIS feature ID: 1615287

Twining is a village in Arenac County of the U.S. state of Michigan. The population was 130 at the 2020 census. The village is situated on the boundary between Mason Township on the west and Turner Township on the east, with about half of the village in each.

== Geography ==
According to the United States Census Bureau, the village has a total area of 0.97 square miles (2.51 km^{2}), all land.

== Demographics ==
Historical population
Census	Pop.	Note	%±
1910	267		—
1920	221		−17.2%
1930	189		−14.5%
1940	178		−5.8%
1950	196		10.1%
1960	199		1.5%
1970	198		−0.5%
1980	196		−1.0%
1990	169		−13.8%
2000	192		13.6%
2010	181		−5.7%
2020	130		−28.2%
U.S. Decennial Census

=== 2010 census ===
As of the census of 2010, there were 181 people, 68 households, and 49 families residing in the village. The population density was 186.6 inhabitants per square mile (72.0/km^{2}). There were 81 housing units at an average density of 83.5 per square mile (32.2/km^{2}). The racial makeup of the village was 98.9% White, 0.6% Native American, and 0.6% from other races. Hispanic or Latino of any race were 1.7% of the population.

There were 68 households, of which 38.2% had children under the age of 18 living with them, 45.6% were married couples living together, 11.8% had a female householder with no husband present, 14.7% had a male householder with no wife present, and 27.9% were non-families. 19.1% of all households were made up of individuals, and 4.4% had someone living alone who was 65 years of age or older. The average household size was 2.66 and the average family size was 3.02.

The median age in the village was 34.5 years. 28.2% of residents were under the age of 18; 6.1% were between the ages of 18 and 24; 26.6% were from 25 to 44; 27.6% were from 45 to 64; and 11.6% were 65 years of age or older. The gender makeup of the village was 48.6% male and 51.4% female.

=== 2000 census ===
As of the census of 2000, there were 192 people, 76 households, and 51 families residing in the village. The population density was 200.4 inhabitants per square mile (77.4/km^{2}). There were 79 housing units at an average density of 82.4 per square mile (31.8/km^{2}). The racial makeup of the village was 100.00% White. Hispanic or Latino of any race were 1.04% of the population.

There were 76 households, out of which 31.6% had children under the age of 18 living with them, 48.7% were married couples living together, 14.5% had a female householder with no husband present, and 31.6% were non-families. 27.6% of all households were made up of individuals, and 17.1% had someone living alone who was 65 years of age or older. The average household size was 2.53 and the average family size was 3.06.

In the village, the population was spread out, with 24.0% under the age of 18, 9.9% from 18 to 24, 28.1% from 25 to 44, 24.0% from 45 to 64, and 14.1% who were 65 years of age or older. The median age was 38 years. For every 100 females, there were 88.2 males. For every 100 females age 18 and over, there were 97.3 males.

The median income for a household in the village was $31,875, and the median income for a family was $31,875. Males had a median income of $40,313 versus $18,750 for females. The per capita income for the village was $13,744. About 22.4% of families and 25.9% of the population were below the poverty line, including 40.5% of those under the age of eighteen and 6.3% of those 65 or over.

== Major highways ==
- M-65
