= Whitney Township, Michigan =

Township in Michigan, United States

- Civil township
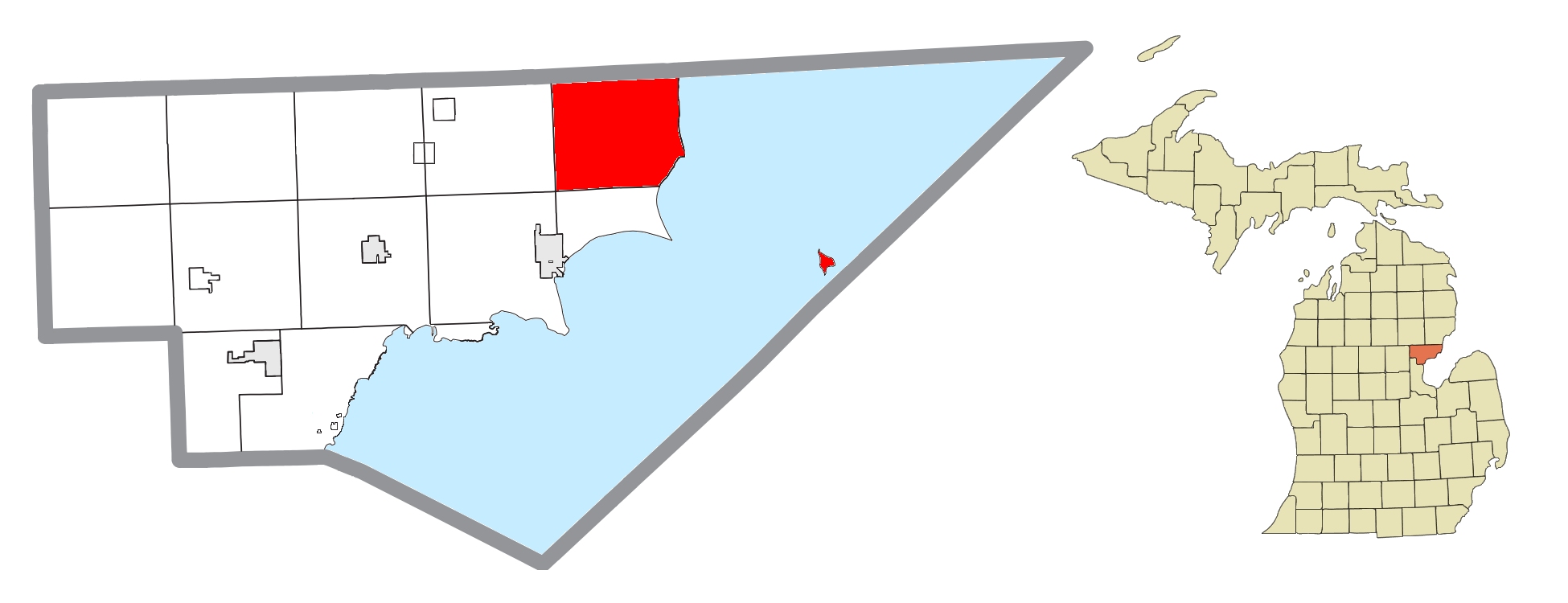
- Location within Arenac County

- Location within the state of Michigan Whitney Township (the United States)
- Coordinates: 44°06′59″N 83°36′22″W
- Country: United States
- State: Michigan
- County: Arenac

Government
  - Supervisor: Donald Becker

Area
  - Total: 44.6 sq mi (115.6 km^{2})
  - Land: 30.7 sq mi (79.6 km^{2})
  - Water: 13.9 sq mi (36.0 km^{2})
- Elevation: 590 ft (180 m)

Population (2020)
  - Total: 907
  - Density: 29.5/sq mi (11.4/km^{2})
- Time zone: UTC-5 (Eastern (EST))
  - Summer (DST): UTC-4 (EDT)
- ZIP code(s): 48703, 48763, 48765
- Area code: 989
- FIPS code: 26-87080
- GNIS feature ID: 1627269
- Website: Official website

Whitney Township is a civil township of Arenac County in the U.S. state of Michigan. The population was 907 at the 2020 census.

== Geography ==
According to the United States Census Bureau, the township has a total area of 44.6 square miles (115.6 km^{2}), of which 30.7 square miles (79.6 km^{2}) is land and 13.9 square miles (36.0 km^{2}), or 31.12%, is water. The township includes Charity Island, located 5 miles (8 km) offshore in Saginaw Bay of Lake Huron.

== Demographics ==
As of the census of 2000, there were 1,033 people, 437 households, and 319 families residing in the township. The population density was 33.0 inhabitants per square mile (12.7/km^{2}). There were 894 housing units at an average density of 28.5 per square mile (11.0/km^{2}). The racial makeup of the township was 98.94% White, 0.29% Native American, 0.29% Asian, 0.29% from other races, and 0.19% from two or more races. Hispanic or Latino of any race were 2.13% of the population.

There were 437 households, out of which 20.1% had children under the age of 18 living with them, 65.7% were married couples living together, 4.3% had a female householder with no husband present, and 26.8% were non-families. 23.3% of all households were made up of individuals, and 13.3% had someone living alone who was 65 years of age or older. The average household size was 2.34 and the average family size was 2.71.

In the township the population was spread out, with 19.8% under the age of 18, 4.6% from 18 to 24, 20.0% from 25 to 44, 31.5% from 45 to 64, and 24.0% who were 65 years of age or older. The median age was 50 years. For every 100 females, there were 97.1 males. For every 100 females age 18 and over, there were 99.5 males.

The median income for a household in the township was $32,989, and the median income for a family was $37,679. Males had a median income of $39,375 versus $24,583 for females. The per capita income for the township was $18,326. About 9.1% of families and 10.9% of the population were below the poverty line, including 14.5% of those under age 18 and 7.4% of those age 65 or over.
