= Turner (given name) =

Turner is a given name derived from turning. It may refer to:

== People ==
- Turner Ashby (1828–1862), Confederate cavalry commander in the American Civil War
- Turner Barber (1893–1968), professional baseball player for the Washington Senators, Chicago Cubs and Brooklyn Robins
- Turner Battle (born 1983), American former basketball point guard for the University at Buffalo Bulls
- Turner Bernard (born 1998), American football player
- Turner Butler (1869–1938), justice of the Arkansas Supreme Court
- Turner Cassity (1929–2009), American poet, playwright, and short story writer
- Turner Catledge (1901–1983), American journalist, best known for his work at The New York Times
- Turner Gill (born 1962), currently the head football coach at Liberty University
- Turner A. Gill (1841–1919), Democrat Kansas City Mayor in 1875 and 1876
- Turner Layton (1894–1978), American songwriter, singer and pianist
- Turner M. Marquette (1831–1894), Nebraska Republican politician, the first house representative for the state
- Turner Gustavus Morehead (1814–1892), officer in the Mexican–American War and American Civil War and Brigadier General in the Union Army
- Turner Saunders (1782–1854), noted Methodist preacher
- Turner Stevenson (born 1972), Canadian former professional ice hockey right winger for the Montreal Canadiens, New Jersey Devils, and Philadelphia Flyers
- Turner Ward (born 1965), former professional baseball player

== Fictional characters ==
- Turner, a character from the Simon Kidgits Club. Developed by Simon Brand Ventures

== See also ==
- Turner (disambiguation)
- Turner (surname)
