= Lincoln Township, Arenac County, Michigan =

Lincoln Township, Michigan
- Civil township
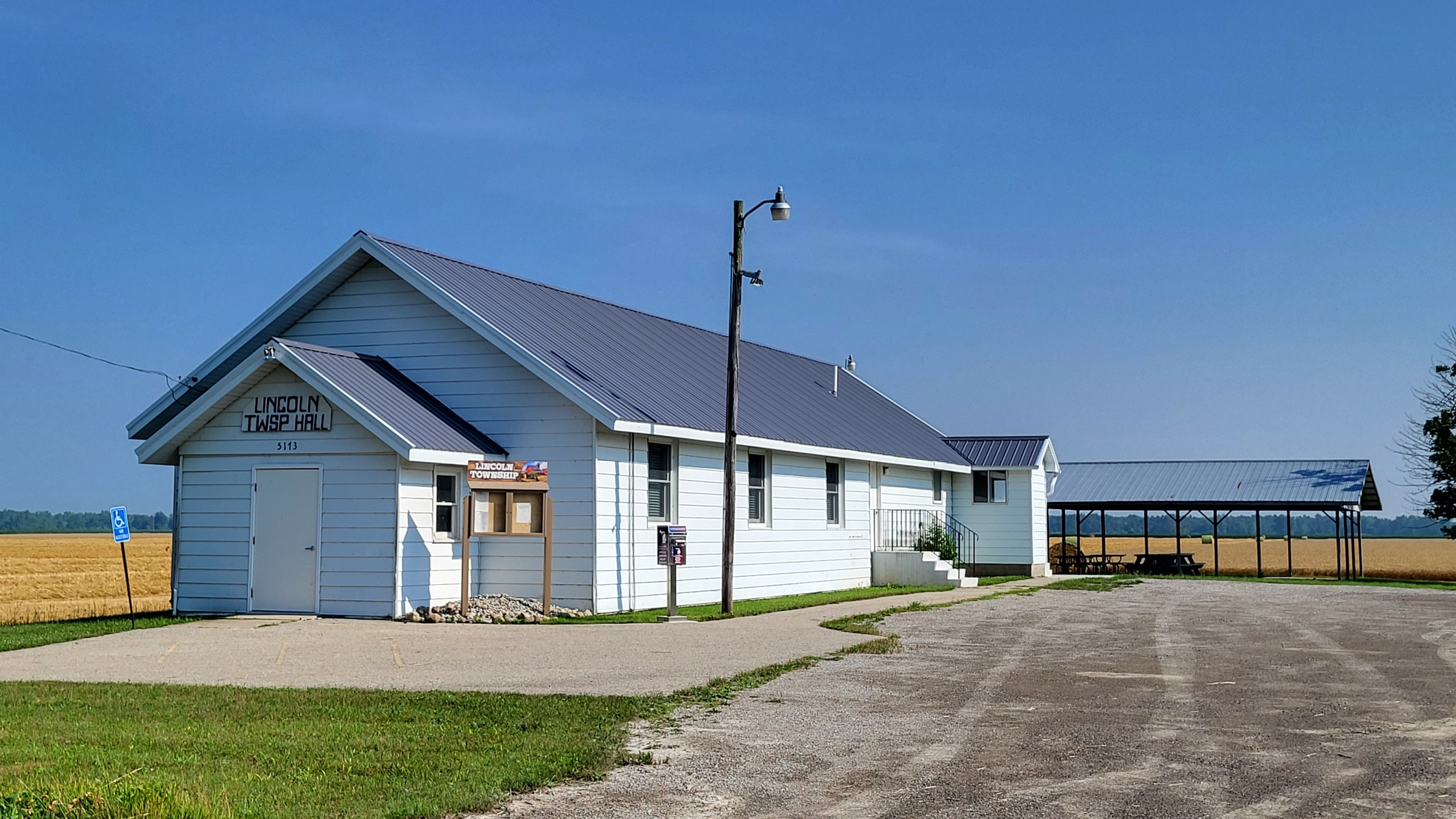
- Lincoln Township Hall

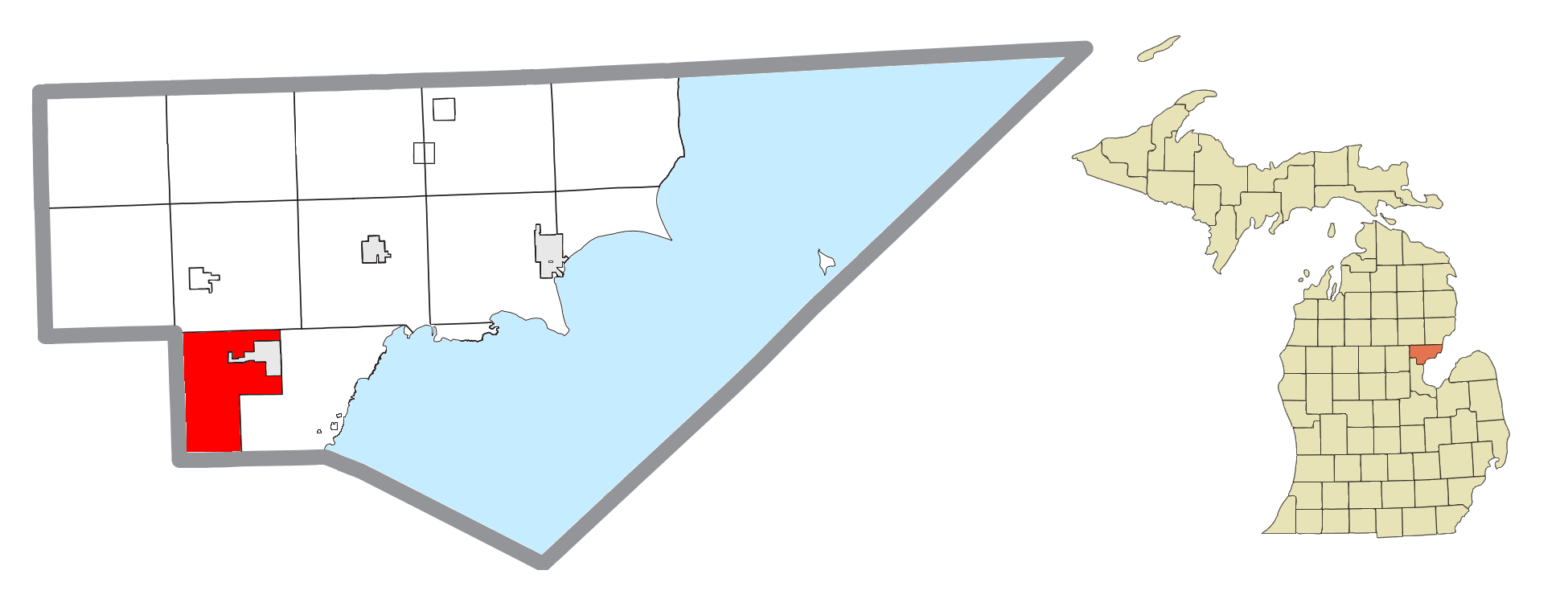
- Location within Arenac County

- Location within the state of Michigan Lincoln Township (the United States)
- Coordinates: 43°57′59″N 83°59′31″W
- Country: United States
- State: Michigan
- County: Arenac

Government
  - Supervisor: Gerald Wenkel

Area
  - Total: 21.2 sq mi (54.8 km^{2})
  - Land: 21.0 sq mi (54.4 km^{2})
  - Water: 0.15 sq mi (0.4 km^{2})
- Elevation: 633 ft (193 m)

Population (2020)
  - Total: 924
  - Density: 44.0/sq mi (17.0/km^{2})
- Time zone: UTC-5 (Eastern (EST))
  - Summer (DST): UTC-4 (EDT)
- ZIP code(s): 48613, 48650, 48658, 48659
- Area code: 989
- FIPS code: 26-47580
- GNIS feature ID: 1626618
- Website: https://www.lincolnarenac.com/

Lincoln Township is a civil township of Arenac County in the U.S. state of Michigan. The population was 924 at the 2020 census. The city of Standish borders the township on the northeast but is administered autonomously.

== Geography ==
According to the United States Census Bureau, the township has a total area of 21.2 square miles (54.8 km^{2}), of which 21.0 square miles (54.4 km^{2}) is land and 0.15 square miles (0.4 km^{2}), or 0.77%, is water.

== Demographics ==
As of the census of 2000, there were 1,522 people, 384 households, and 289 families residing in the township. The population density was 72.6 inhabitants per square mile (28.0/km^{2}). There were 434 housing units at an average density of 20.7 per square mile (8.0/km^{2}). The racial makeup of the township was 75.62% White, 19.51% African American, 1.12% Native American, 0.59% Asian, 0.33% from other races, and 2.83% from two or more races. Hispanic or Latino of any race were 1.51% of the population.

There were 384 households, out of which 31.3% had children under the age of 18 living with them, 59.9% were married couples living together, 10.2% had a female householder with no husband present, and 24.5% were non-families. 19.8% of all households were made up of individuals, and 10.7% had someone living alone who was 65 years of age or older. The average household size was 2.62 and the average family size was 2.96.

In the township the population was spread out, with 16.6% under the age of 18, 12.4% from 18 to 24, 42.6% from 25 to 44, 18.7% from 45 to 64, and 9.8% who were 65 years of age or older. The median age was 35 years. For every 100 females, there were 209.3 males. For every 100 females age 18 and over, there were 239.6 males.

The median income for a household in the township was $35,982, and the median income for a family was $40,000. Males had a median income of $30,000 versus $17,135 for females. The per capita income for the township was $13,796. About 16.1% of families and 19.7% of the population were below the poverty line, including 32.3% of those under age 18 and 11.4% of those age 65 or over.
