= Adams Township, Arenac County, Michigan =

Adams Township, Michigan
- Civil township
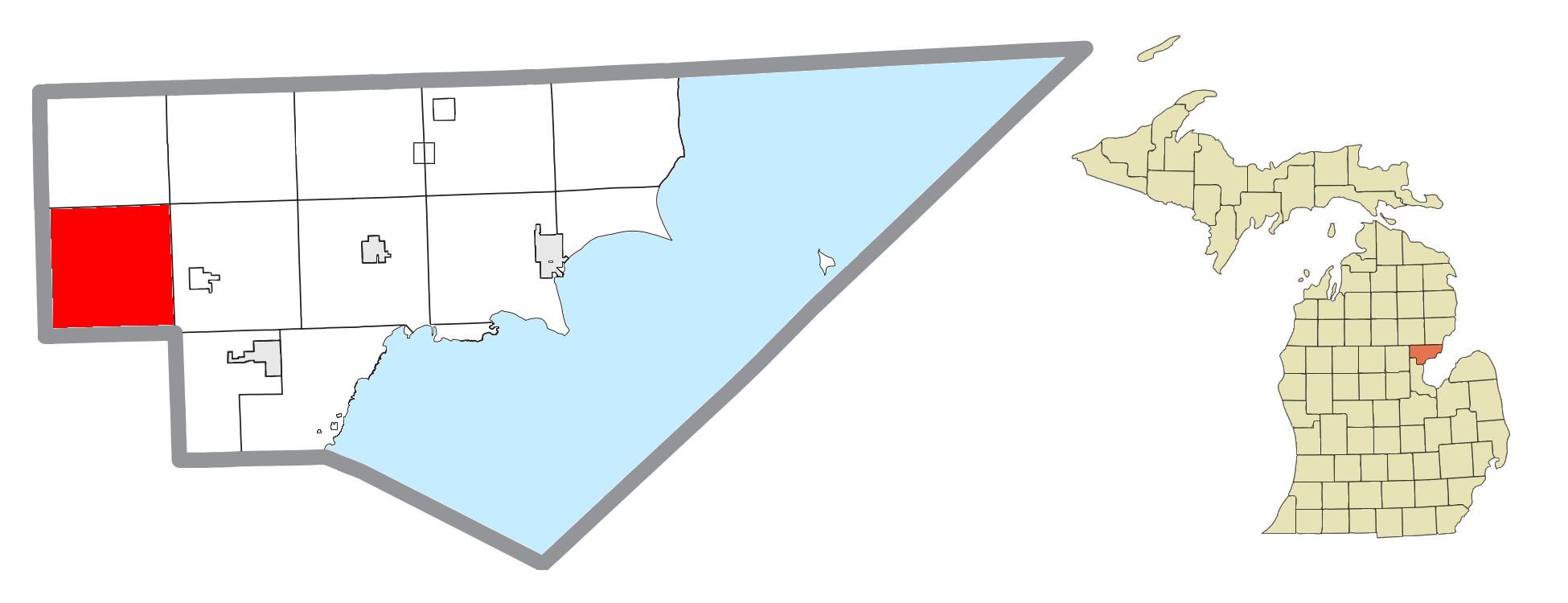
- Location within Arenac County

- Location within the state of Michigan Adams Township (the United States)
- Coordinates: 44°02′13″N 84°04′56″W
- Country: United States
- State: Michigan
- County: Arenac
- Organized: 1886

Government
  - Supervisor: Dan Fisk

Area
  - Total: 35.7 sq mi (92.5 km^{2})
  - Land: 35.6 sq mi (92.3 km^{2})
  - Water: 0.077 sq mi (0.2 km^{2})
- Elevation: 774 ft (236 m)

Population (2020)
  - Total: 554
  - Density: 15.5/sq mi (6.00/km^{2})
- Time zone: UTC-5 (Eastern (EST))
  - Summer (DST): UTC-4 (EDT)
- ZIP code(s): 48610, 48613, 48659
- Area code: 989
- FIPS code: 26-00280
- GNIS feature ID: 1625799

Adams Township is a civil township of Arenac County in the U.S. state of Michigan. As of the 2020 census, the township population was 554.

== History ==
On March 29, 1886, Adams Township was set off from Deep River Township. James Adams, Albert Reagh and Lui Klein were appointed to oversee the first annual township meeting to be held April 5, 1886

== Geography ==
According to the United States Census Bureau, the township has a total area of 35.7 square miles (92.5 km^{2}), of which 35.6 square miles (92.3 km^{2}) is land and 0.077 square miles (0.2 km^{2}), or 0.26%, is water.

== Demographics ==
As of the census of 2000, there were 550 people, 190 households, and 151 families residing in the township. The population density was 15.4 per square mile (6.0/km^{2}). There were 226 housing units at an average density of 6.3 per square mile (2.4/km^{2}). The racial makeup of the township was 97.45% White, 1.27% Native American, 0.18% Asian, and 1.09% from two or more races. Hispanic or Latino of any race were 0.55% of the population.

There were 190 households, out of which 39.5% had children under the age of 18 living with them, 66.8% were married couples living together, 7.9% had a female householder with no husband present, and 20.5% were non-families. 18.9% of all households were made up of individuals, and 10.5% had someone living alone who was 65 years of age or older. The average household size was 2.89 and the average family size was 3.29.

In the township the population was spread out, with 30.7% under the age of 18, 7.1% from 18 to 24, 28.5% from 25 to 44, 23.8% from 45 to 64, and 9.8% who were 65 years of age or older. The median age was 35 years. For every 100 females, there were 103.7 males. For every 100 females age 18 and over, there were 97.4 males.

The median income for a household in the township was $36,346, and the median income for a family was $40,227. Males had a median income of $26,029 versus $19,625 for females. The per capita income for the township was $14,776. About 11.4% of families and 15.4% of the population were below the poverty line, including 26.3% of those under age 18 and 13.1% of those age 65 or over.
