= Turner Township, Michigan =

- Civil township
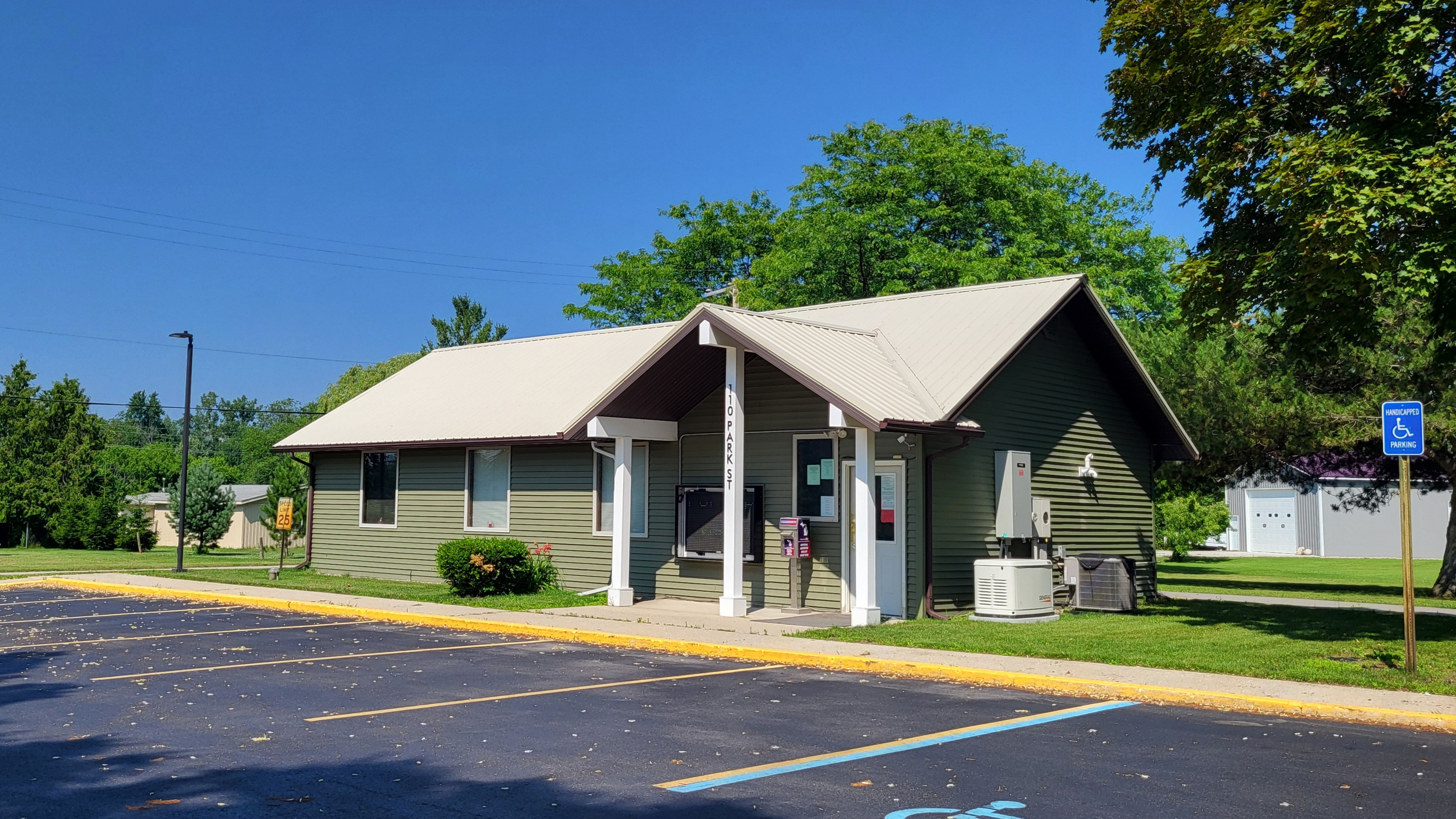
- Turner Township Hall in Twining

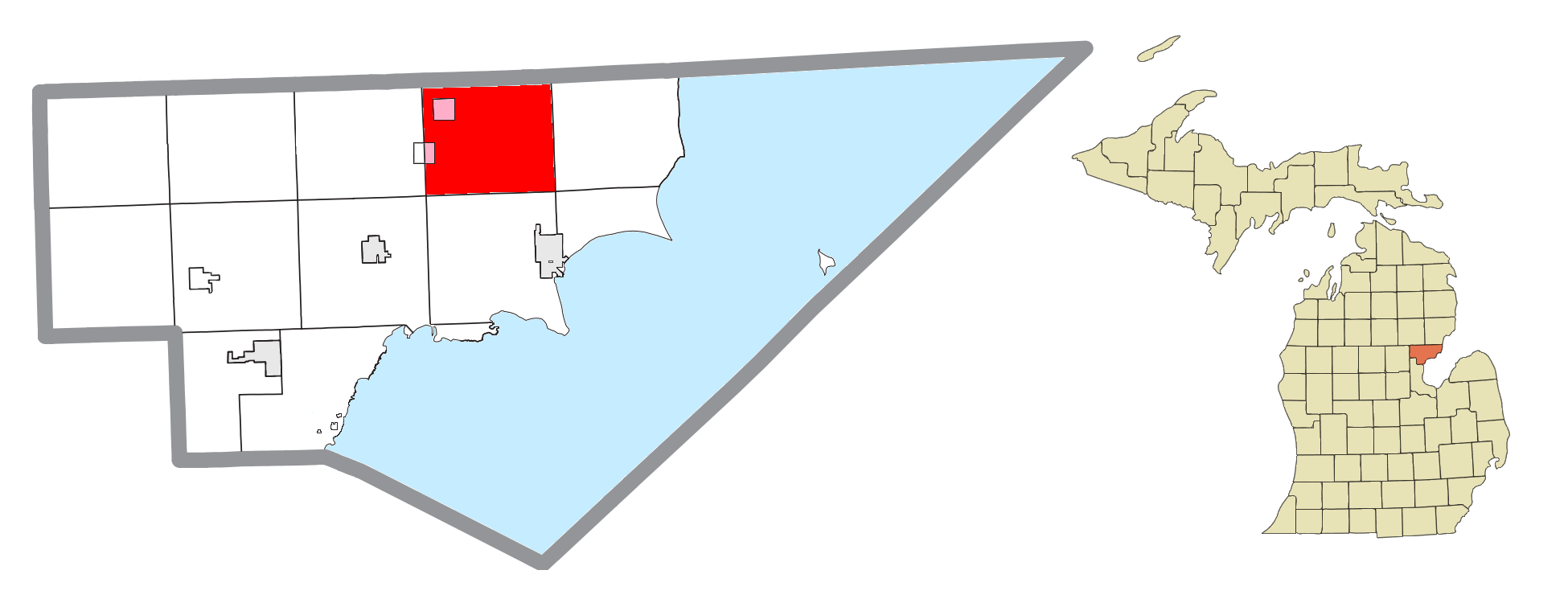
- Location within Arenac County (red) and the administered villages of Turner and portion of Twining (pink)

- Location within the state of Michigan Turner Township (the United States)
- Coordinates: 44°7′28″N 83°45′7″W
- Country: United States
- State: Michigan
- County: Arenac

Government
  - Supervisor: Jeremy Gates

Area
  - Total: 32.3 sq mi (83.7 km^{2})
  - Land: 31.2 sq mi (80.7 km^{2})
  - Water: 1.2 sq mi (3.1 km^{2})
- Elevation: 617 ft (188 m)

Population (2020)
  - Total: 519
  - Density: 16.7/sq mi (6.43/km^{2})
- Time zone: UTC-5 (Eastern (EST))
  - Summer (DST): UTC-4 (EDT)
- ZIP code(s): 48703, 48765, 48766
- Area code: 989
- FIPS code: 26-80840
- GNIS feature ID: 1627178
- Website: https://turnertownship.com/

Turner Township is a civil township of Arenac County in the U.S. state of Michigan. As of the 2020 census, it had a population of 519. The villages of Turner and the eastern portion of Twining are located within the township.

== Geography ==
According to the United States Census Bureau, the township has a total area of 32.3 square miles (83.7 km^{2}), of which 31.2 square miles (80.7 km^{2}) is land and 1.2 square miles (3.1 km^{2}), or 3.66%, is water.

== Demographics ==
As of the census of 2000, there were 642 people, 243 households, and 174 families residing in the township. The population density was 19.8 per square mile (7.7/km^{2}). There were 303 housing units at an average density of 9.4 per square mile (3.6/km^{2}). The racial makeup of the township was 97.66% White, 0.16% African American, 0.31% Native American, 0.31% Asian, 0.47% from other races, and 1.09% from two or more races. Hispanic or Latino of any race were 0.78% of the population.

There were 243 households, out of which 32.9% had children under the age of 18 living with them, 60.1% were married couples living together, 7.4% had a female householder with no husband present, and 28.0% were non-families. 23.5% of all households were made up of individuals, and 10.7% had someone living alone who was 65 years of age or older. The average household size was 2.64 and the average family size was 3.12.

In the township the population was spread out, with 26.8% under the age of 18, 7.8% from 18 to 24, 24.8% from 25 to 44, 25.9% from 45 to 64, and 14.8% who were 65 years of age or older. The median age was 39 years. For every 100 females, there were 113.3 males. For every 100 females age 18 and over, there were 103.5 males.

The median income for a household in the township was $35,104, and the median income for a family was $38,125. Males had a median income of $25,982 versus $18,942 for females. The per capita income for the township was $13,416. About 18.4% of families and 21.1% of the population were below the poverty line, including 29.3% of those under age 18 and 14.3% of those age 65 or over.
