= Maple Ridge Township =

Maple Ridge Township is the name of a few townships in the United States:

- Maple Ridge Township, Alpena County, Michigan
- Maple Ridge Township, Delta County, Michigan
- Maple Ridge Township, Beltrami County, Minnesota
- Maple Ridge Township, Isanti County, Minnesota
