= Logan Township, Ogemaw County, Michigan =

Logan Township, Michigan
- Civil township
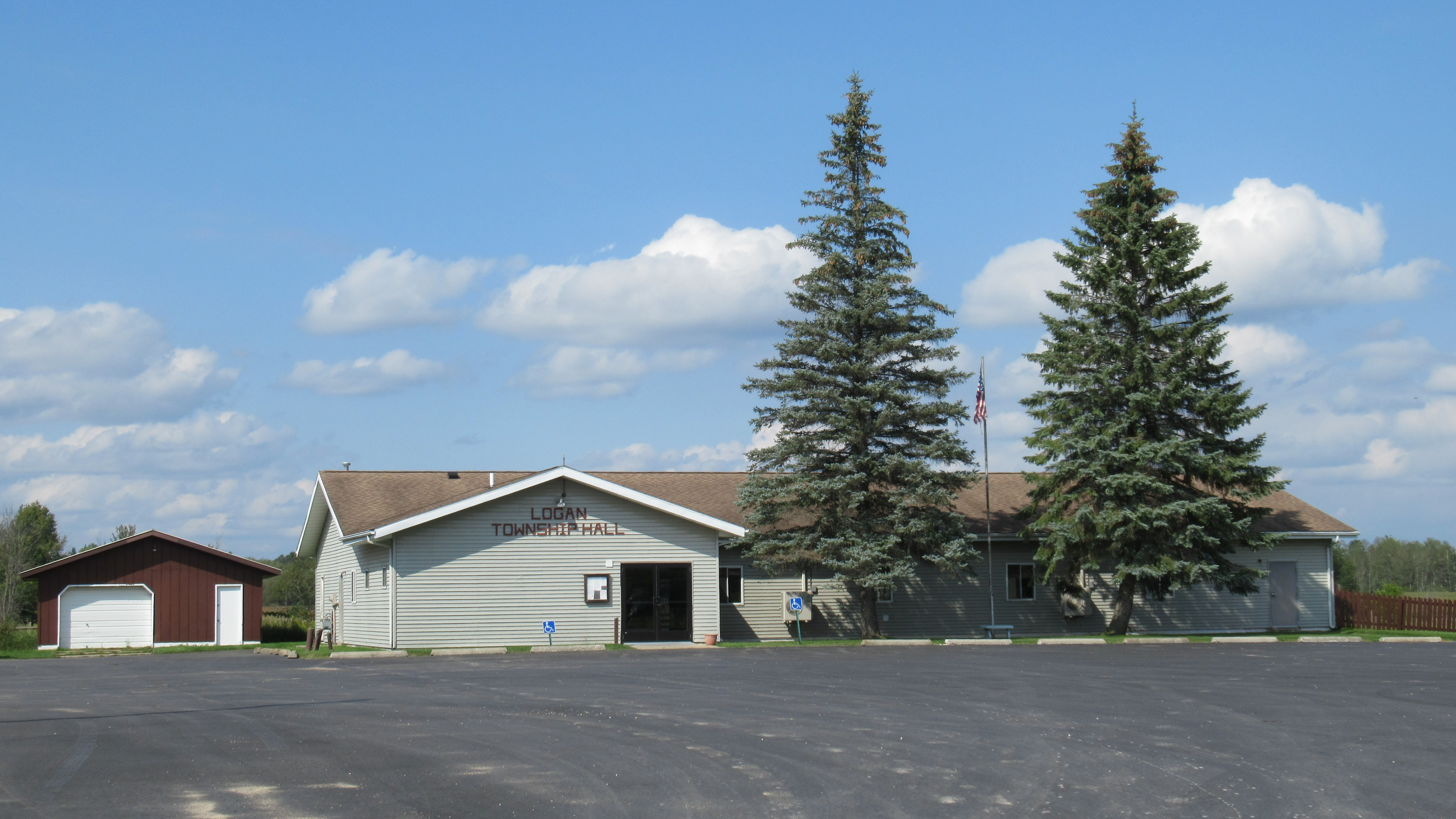
- Logan Township Hall

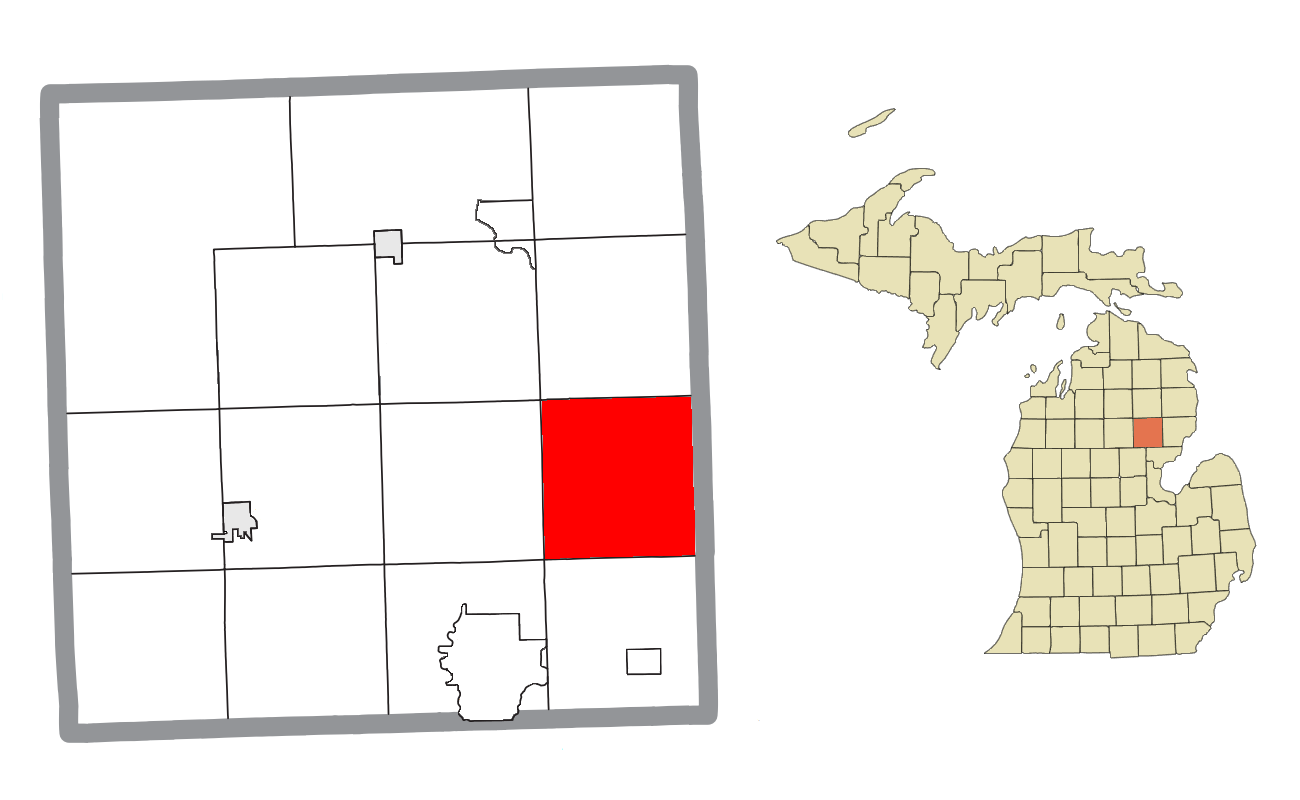
- Location within Ogemaw County

- Location within the state of Michigan Location within the United States
- Coordinates: 44°17′17″N 83°57′26″W
- Country: United States
- State: Michigan
- County: Ogemaw

Government
  - Supervisor: Karen Maxwell
  - Clerk: Tonya Schagel

Area
  - Total: 35.99 sq mi (93.21 km^{2})
  - Land: 35.23 sq mi (91.25 km^{2})
  - Water: 0.76 sq mi (1.97 km^{2})
- Elevation: 850 ft (259 m)

Population (2020)
  - Total: 596
  - Density: 16.9/sq mi (6.53/km^{2})
- Time zone: UTC-5 (Eastern (EST))
  - Summer (DST): UTC-4 (EDT)
- ZIP code(s): 48635 (Lupton); 48739 (Hale); 48756 (Prescott)
- Area code: 989
- FIPS code: 26-49160
- GNIS feature ID: 1626638

Logan Township is a civil township of Ogemaw County in the U.S. state of Michigan. The population was 596 at the 2020 census.

== Communities ==
- Corrigan was a lumber settlement in the township. It had a post office from August 18, 1891 until August 14, 1897.
- Nester was another lumber settlement it the township, and it had a post office that operated from September 6, 1901 until June 30, 1911.

== Geography ==
According to the U.S. Census Bureau, the township has a total area of 35.99 square miles (93.21 km^{2}), of which 35.23 square miles (91.25 km^{2}) is land and 0.76 square miles (1.97 km^{2}) (2.11%) is water.

== Demographics ==
As of the census of 2000, there were 581 people, 239 households, and 173 families residing in the township. The population density was 16.5 inhabitants per square mile (6.4/km^{2}). There were 430 housing units at an average density of 12.2 per square mile (4.7/km^{2}). The racial makeup of the township was 96.73% White, 0.34% Native American, 0.17% from other races, and 2.75% from two or more races. Hispanic or Latino of any race were 0.86% of the population.

There were 239 households, out of which 23.8% had children under the age of 18 living with them, 64.4% were married couples living together, 5.4% had a female householder with no husband present, and 27.2% were non-families. 23.8% of all households were made up of individuals, and 10.9% had someone living alone who was 65 years of age or older. The average household size was 2.39 and the average family size was 2.82.

In the township the population was spread out, with 20.7% under the age of 18, 6.7% from 18 to 24, 23.8% from 25 to 44, 26.5% from 45 to 64, and 22.4% who were 65 years of age or older. The median age was 44 years. For every 100 females, there were 108.2 males. For every 100 females age 18 and over, there were 101.3 males.

The median income for a household in the township was $22,105, and the median income for a family was $29,531. Males had a median income of $30,000 versus $17,115 for females. The per capita income for the township was $15,372. About 13.1% of families and 15.9% of the population were below the poverty line, including 19.6% of those under age 18 and 9.0% of those age 65 or over.
