= Deep River Township, Michigan =

- Civil township
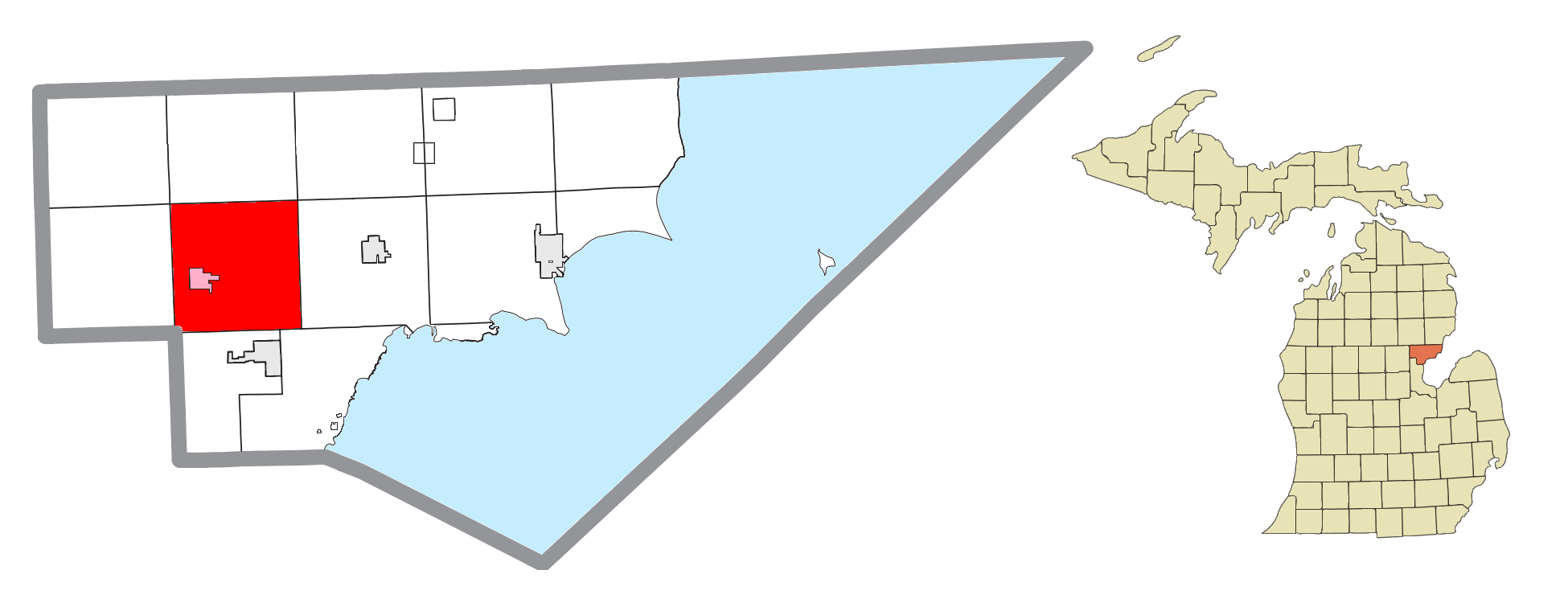
- Location within Arenac County (red) and the administered village of Sterling (pink)

- Location within the state of Michigan Deep River Township (the United States)
- Coordinates: 44°02′05″N 83°59′52″W
- Country: United States
- State: Michigan
- County: Arenac
- Organized: 1873

Government
  - Supervisor: Karlia Raymond-Kroczaleski

Area
  - Total: 35.5 sq mi (92.0 km^{2})
  - Land: 35.3 sq mi (91.4 km^{2})
  - Water: 0.23 sq mi (0.6 km^{2})
- Elevation: 732 ft (223 m)

Population (2020)
  - Total: 2,050
  - Density: 58.1/sq mi (22.4/km^{2})
- Time zone: UTC-5 (Eastern (EST))
  - Summer (DST): UTC-4 (EDT)
- ZIP code(s): 48658, 48659, 48749
- Area code: 989
- FIPS code: 26-21120
- GNIS feature ID: 1626167
- Website: https://deeprivertwp.org/

Deep River Township is a civil township of Arenac County in the U.S. state of Michigan. The population was 2,050 at the 2020 census. The village of Sterling is located within the township.

== History ==
Deep River Township was organized February 28, 1873, at the time part of Bay County. John Bullock, George H. Childs and Thomas White were appointed to oversee the first township meeting on the 1st Monday in April of that year In 1886, Adams Township was split off from Deep River Township

== Geography ==
According to the United States Census Bureau, the township has a total area of 35.5 square miles (92.0 km^{2}), of which 35.3 square miles (91.4 km^{2}) is land and 0.23 square miles (0.6 km^{2}), or 0.70%, is water.

== Demographics ==
As of the census of 2000, there were 2,244 people, 839 households, and 614 families residing in the township. The population density was 63.5 inhabitants per square mile (24.5/km^{2}). There were 1,051 housing units at an average density of 29.7 per square mile (11.5/km^{2}). The racial makeup of the township was 97.91% White, 0.98% Native American, 0.13% Asian, 0.13% from other races, and 0.85% from two or more races. Hispanic or Latino of any race were 2.72% of the population.

There were 839 households, out of which 34.8% had children under the age of 18 living with them, 59.6% were married couples living together, 9.1% had a female householder with no husband present, and 26.7% were non-families. 23.0% of all households were made up of individuals, and 10.6% had someone living alone who was 65 years of age or older. The average household size was 2.54 and the average family size was 2.97.

In the township the population was spread out, with 25.4% under the age of 18, 7.2% from 18 to 24, 27.3% from 25 to 44, 23.8% from 45 to 64, and 16.4% who were 65 years of age or older. The median age was 39 years. For every 100 females, there were 96.7 males. For every 100 females age 18 and over, there were 92.5 males.

The median income for a household in the township was $37,457, and the median income for a family was $42,014. Males had a median income of $31,771 versus $21,944 for females. The per capita income for the township was $16,945. About 10.4% of families and 12.1% of the population were below the poverty line, including 15.0% of those under age 18 and 7.7% of those age 65 or over.
