= Arenac Township, Michigan =

- Civil township
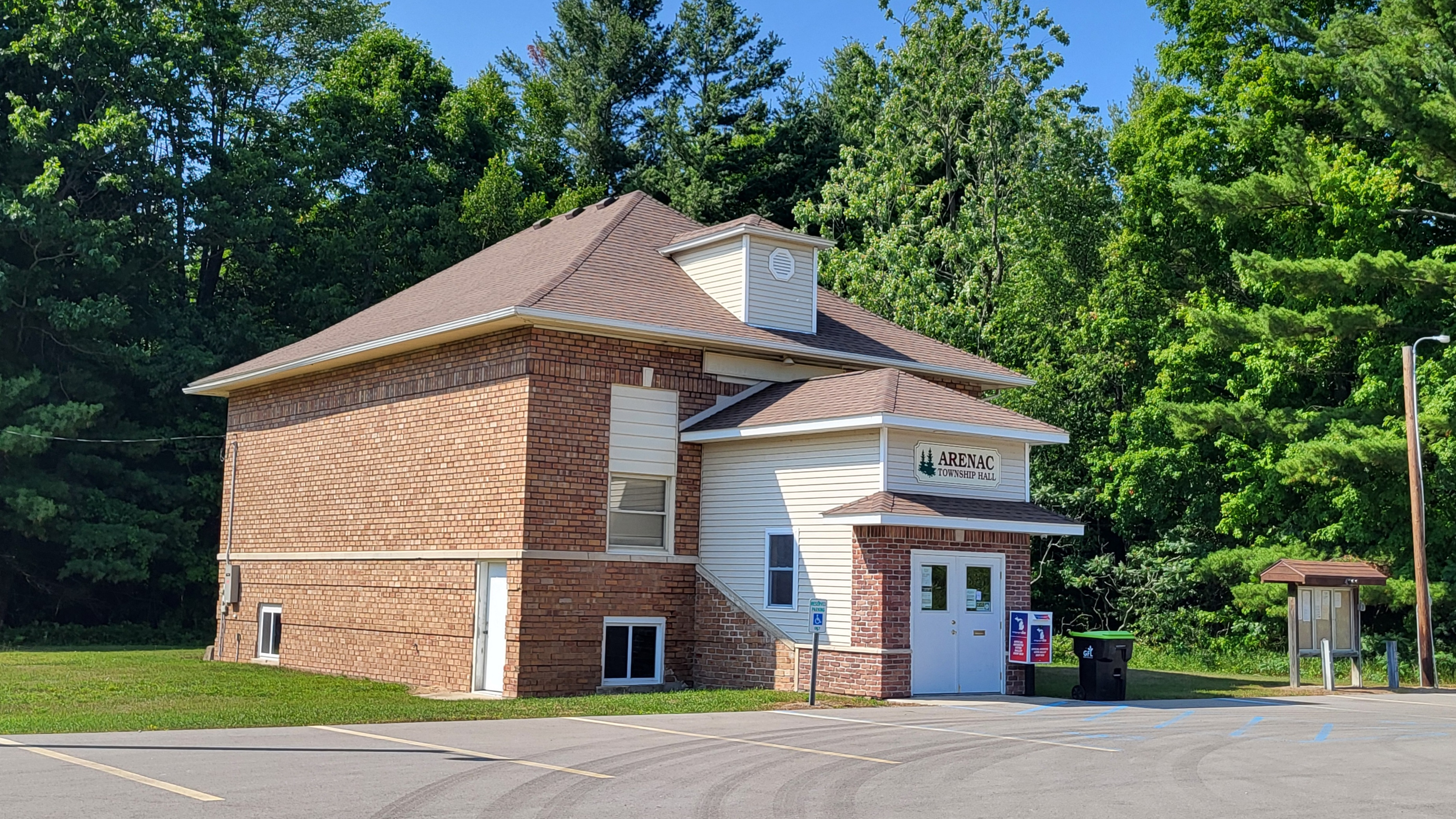
- Arenac Township Hall

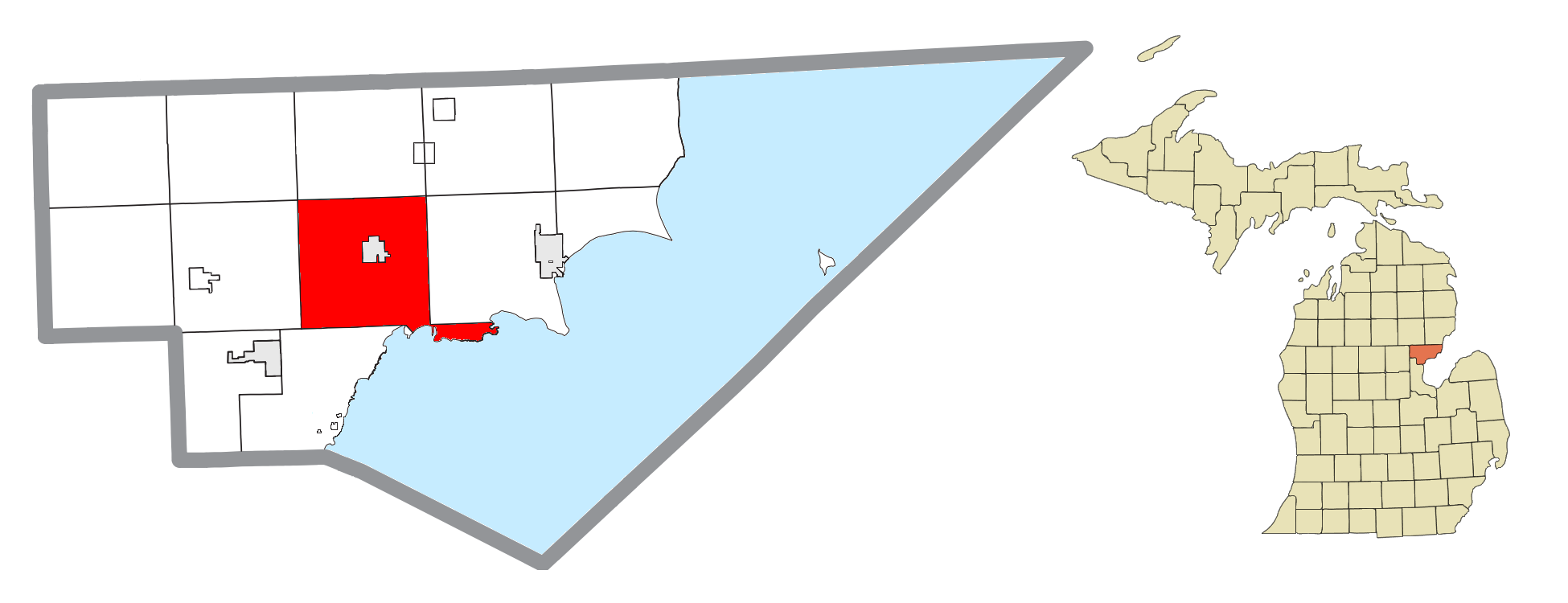
- Location within Arenac County

- Location within the state of Michigan Arenac Township (the United States)
- Coordinates: 44°01′37″N 83°51′26″W
- Country: United States
- State: Michigan
- County: Arenac

Government
  - Supervisor: Tim Hagley

Area
  - Total: 38.1 sq mi (98.6 km^{2})
  - Land: 35.8 sq mi (92.7 km^{2})
  - Water: 2.3 sq mi (5.9 km^{2})
- Elevation: 614 ft (187 m)

Population (2020)
  - Total: 871
  - Density: 24.3/sq mi (9.40/km^{2})
- Time zone: UTC-5 (Eastern (EST))
  - Summer (DST): UTC-4 (EDT)
- ZIP code(s): 48658, 49749, 48766
- Area code: 989
- FIPS code: 26-03360
- GNIS feature ID: 1625846
- Website: Official website

Arenac Township is a civil township of Arenac County in the U.S. state of Michigan. As of the 2020 census, the township population was 871. The city of Omer is surrounded by the township but is administered autonomously.

== Geography ==
According to the United States Census Bureau, the township has a total area of 38.1 square miles (98.6 km^{2}), of which 35.8 square miles (92.7 km^{2}) is land and 2.3 square miles (5.9 km^{2}), or 6.02%, is water.

== Demographics ==
As of the census of 2000, there were 992 people, 389 households, and 275 families residing in the township. The population density was 27.1 inhabitants per square mile (10.5/km^{2}). There were 495 housing units at an average density of 13.5 per square mile (5.2/km^{2}). The racial makeup of the township was 96.57% White, 0.40% African American, 1.31% Native American, 0.10% Asian, 0.10% from other races, and 1.51% from two or more races. Hispanic or Latino of any race were 0.71% of the population.

There were 389 households, out of which 29.0% had children under the age of 18 living with them, 56.8% were married couples living together, 8.5% had a female householder with no husband present, and 29.3% were non-families. 23.4% of all households were made up of individuals, and 12.3% had someone living alone who was 65 years of age or older. The average household size was 2.55 and the average family size was 3.01.

In the township the population was spread out, with 23.0% under the age of 18, 8.9% from 18 to 24, 26.9% from 25 to 44, 22.6% from 45 to 64, and 18.6% who were 65 years of age or older. The median age was 40 years. For every 100 females, there were 98.4 males. For every 100 females age 18 and over, there were 99.0 males.

The median income for a household in the township was $35,417, and the median income for a family was $39,000. Males had a median income of $30,000 versus $23,194 for females. The per capita income for the township was $16,673. About 9.8% of families and 12.4% of the population were below the poverty line, including 18.4% of those under age 18 and 9.0% of those age 65 or over.
