= Turner, Michigan =

- Village
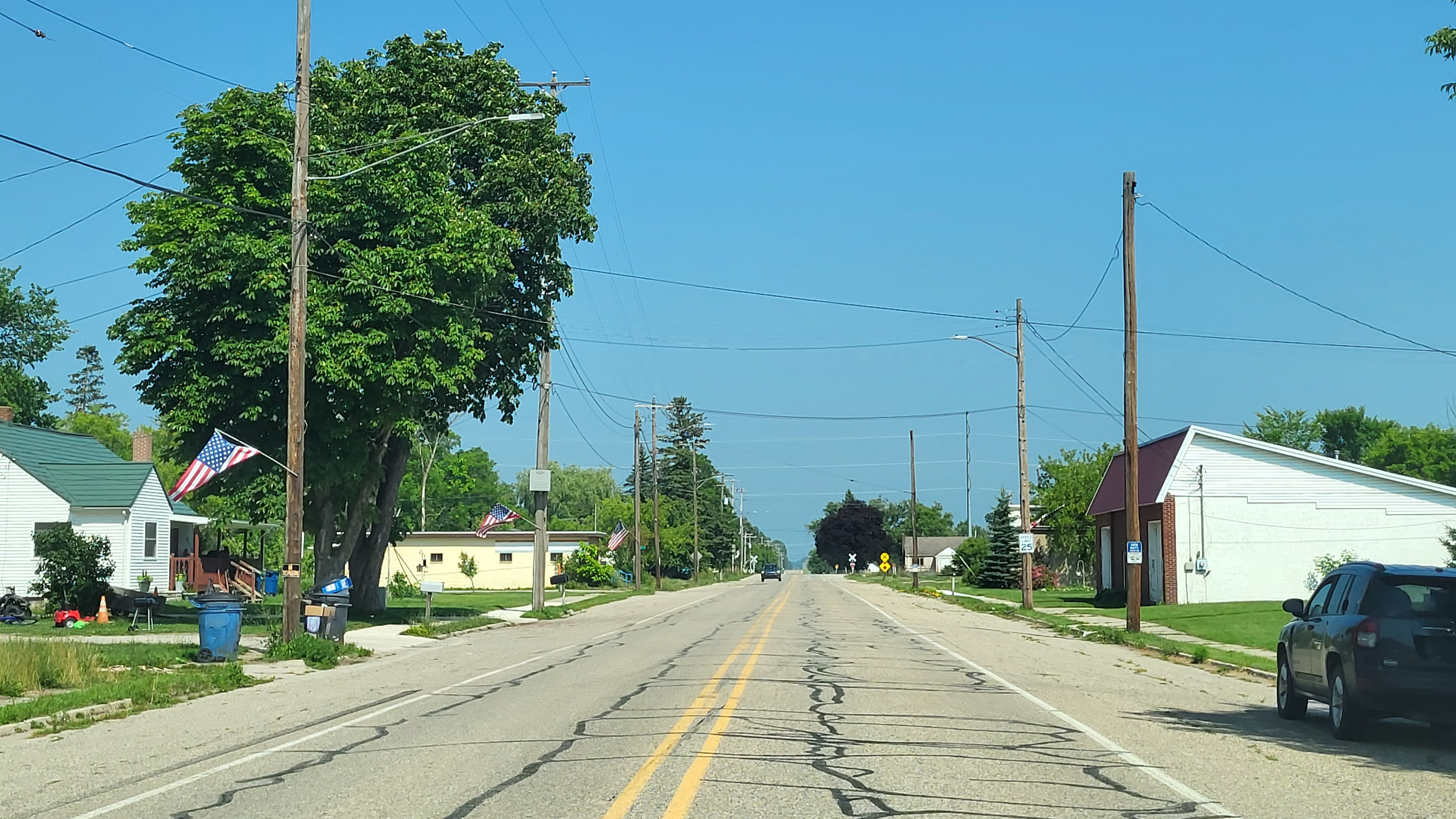
- Looking east along Main Street

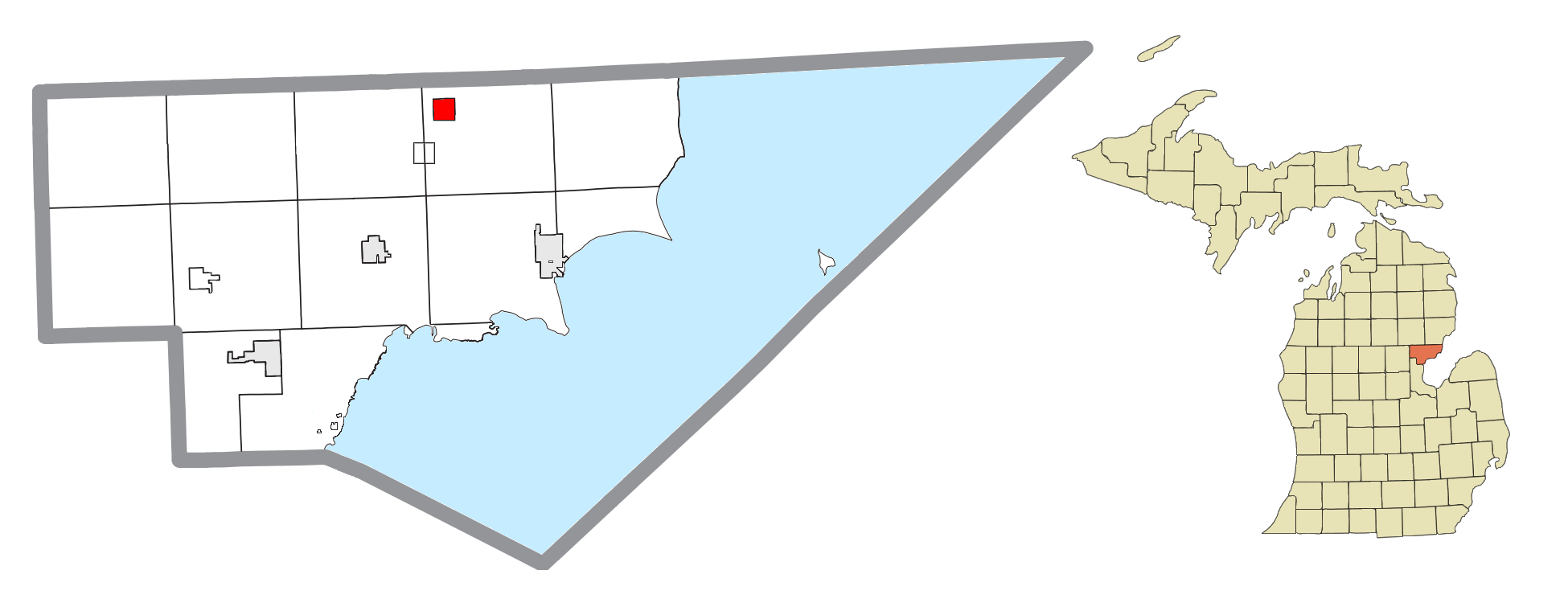
- Location within Arenac County

- Location within the state of Michigan Location within the United States
- Coordinates: 44°08′32″N 83°47′10″W
- Country: United States
- State: Michigan
- County: Arenac
- Township: Turner

Area
  - Total: 1.02 sq mi (2.65 km^{2})
  - Land: 1.02 sq mi (2.65 km^{2})
  - Water: 0 sq mi (0.00 km^{2})
- Elevation: 636 ft (194 m)

Population (2020)
  - Total: 121
  - Density: 118.2/sq mi (45.64/km^{2})
- Time zone: UTC-5 (Eastern (EST))
  - Summer (DST): UTC-4 (EDT)
- ZIP code(s): 48765
- Area code: 989
- FIPS code: 26-80820
- GNIS feature ID: 1615180

Turner is a village in Arenac County in the U.S. state of Michigan. The population was 121 at the 2020 census, which ranks Turner as the second least-populated incorporated municipality in the state after the village of Forestville. The village is located within Turner Township.

== History ==
Turner, originally Turnerville, was named after Joe Turner, one of the first non-native settlers to the area in the 1870s; the land was previously home to the Ojibwa tribe. Taking opportunity of the dense, mature forests covering the region, Joe Turner established a successful lumber company and the settlement quickly expanded to include a blacksmith, church, depot, general store, hotel, mill, post office, restaurant, roundhouse, saloon, schoolhouse, shoe store, and train repair facilities. In the 1880s, the Detroit & Mackinac Railway lay tracks through the settlement, allowing it to connect directly to nearby National City, Twining, Omer, and Standish; these tracks are still operational and are now owned by Lake State Railway. The settlement became a recognized village in 1915. As the vast tracts of forest were cleared, industry transitioned away from logging and into farming during the remainder of the 1900s. Today, the majority of Turner continues to be farmed by local families. With bigger opportunities to be found elsewhere, Turner's businesses slowly shut their doors; the last operating business in the village is Turner Bean and Grain. However, the original buildings, such as the school house and church, still remain and have been converted into private homes. Due to the abundance of flat, cleared terrain, the area has also become of interest to solar energy developers, notably DTE Energy, one of Michigan's largest energy providers.

== Geography ==
According to the United States Census Bureau, the village has a total area of 1.02 square miles (2.64 km^{2}), all land.

== Demographics ==
Historical population
Census	Pop.	Note	%±
1920	236		—
1930	159		−32.6%
1940	182		14.5%
1950	193		6.0%
1960	206		6.7%
1970	182		−11.7%
1980	187		2.7%
1990	158		−15.5%
2000	139		−12.0%
2010	114		−18.0%
2020	121		6.1%
U.S. Decennial Census

=== 2010 census ===
As of the census of 2010, there were 114 people, 43 households, and 32 families residing in the village. The population density was 111.8 inhabitants per square mile (43.2/km^{2}). There were 55 housing units at an average density of 53.9 per square mile (20.8/km^{2}). The racial makeup of the village was 95.6% White, 1.8% African American, and 2.6% from two or more races.

There were 43 households, of which 39.5% had children under the age of 18 living with them, 53.5% were married couples living together, 16.3% had a female householder with no husband present, 4.7% had a male householder with no wife present, and 25.6% were non-families. 18.6% of all households were made up of individuals, and 9.3% had someone living alone who was 65 years of age or older. The average household size was 2.65 and the average family size was 2.94.

The median age in the village was 42 years. 25.4% of residents were under the age of 18; 8% were between the ages of 18 and 24; 23.7% were from 25 to 44; 27.9% were from 45 to 64; and 14.9% were 65 years of age or older. The gender makeup of the village was 45.6% male and 54.4% female.

=== 2000 census ===
As of the census of 2000, there were 139 people, 45 households, and 31 families residing in the village. The population density was 136.1 inhabitants per square mile (52.5/km^{2}). There were 55 housing units at an average density of 53.9 per square mile (20.8/km^{2}). The racial makeup of the village was 96.40% White, 1.44% Native American, and 2.16% from two or more races.

There were 45 households, out of which 53.3% had children under the age of 18 living with them, 55.6% were married couples living together, 11.1% had a female householder with no husband present, and 28.9% were non-families. 24.4% of all households were made up of individuals, and 13.3% had someone living alone who was 65 years of age or older. The average household size was 3.09 and the average family size was 3.63.

In the village, the population was spread out, with 38.8% under the age of 18, 7.9% from 18 to 24, 26.6% from 25 to 44, 15.1% from 45 to 64, and 11.5% who were 65 years of age or older. The median age was 28 years. For every 100 females, there were 107.5 males. For every 100 females age 18 and over, there were 84.8 males.

The median income for a household in the village was $22,813, and the median income for a family was $21,250. Males had a median income of $27,500 versus $23,750 for females. The per capita income for the village was $9,406. There were 38.5% of families and 34.6% of the population living below the poverty line, including 28.6% of under eighteens and 58.3% of those over 64.
