= Arenac County, Michigan =

County in Michigan, United States

- County
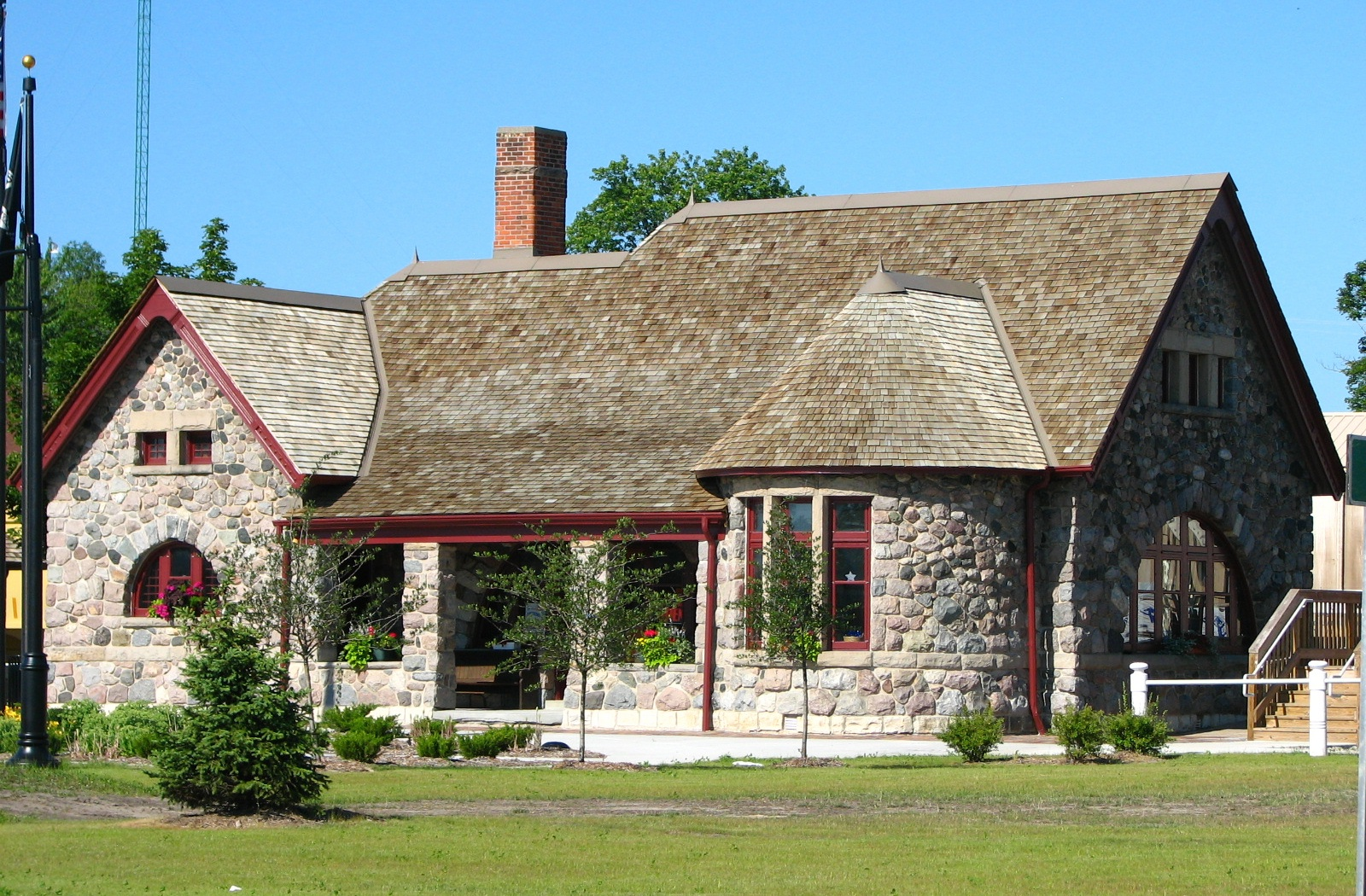
- Michigan Central Railroad Standish Depot

- Location within the U.S. state of Michigan
- Coordinates: 44°03′N 83°45′W
- Country: United States
- State: Michigan
- Founded: April 21, 1883; 143 years ago
- Seat: Standish
- Largest city: Standish

Area
  - Total: 681 sq mi (1,760 km^{2})
  - Land: 363 sq mi (940 km^{2})
  - Water: 317 sq mi (820 km^{2}) 47%

Population (2020)
  - Total: 15,002
  - Estimate (2025): 15,068 ▲
  - Density: 41.3/sq mi (16.0/km^{2})
- Time zone: UTC−5 (Eastern)
  - Summer (DST): UTC−4 (EDT)
- Congressional district: 1st
- Website: https://www.arenaccountymi.gov/

Arenac County (/ˈɛərənæk/ AIR-ə-nak) is a county located in the U.S. state of Michigan. As of the 2020 Census, the population was 15,002. The county seat is Standish.

== History ==
Arenac County was created by the Michigan Territory on 2 March 1831, then attached on 2 March 1836 to Saginaw County for administration. The creation and organization of Bay County overlaid Arenac and annexed portions of Saginaw and Midland Counties, causing the legal elimination of Arenac County on 20 April 1857. On 21 April 1883 Arenac County was re-created from the then existing northern townships of Bay County, with somewhat different boundaries than its previous creation. The name Arenac, coined by Henry Rowe Schoolcraft, a US Indian Agent and ethnologist, is a derivation of the Latin arena and the Native American ac. The combined words mean “A sandy place for a good footing.”

The county includes some off-reservation trust lands held by the federal government for the federally recognized Saginaw Chippewa Tribal Nation, which is based in Isabella County. In early 2007, plans were confirmed for a casino to be constructed outside of the city of Standish with a scheduled opening by the end of the year. It is owned and operated by the Saginaw Chippewa Tribe. The Saganing Eagles Landing Casino grand opening was held on January 24, 2008.

== Geography ==
According to the U.S. Census Bureau, the county has a total area of 681 square miles (1,760 km^{2}), of which 363 square miles (940 km^{2}) is land and 317 square miles (820 km^{2}) (47%) is water. It is the third-smallest county in Michigan by land area. Arenac County can be considered a part of either Northern Michigan or Central Michigan.

=== Geographic features ===
- Saginaw Bay on Lake Huron
- Au Gres River
- Rifle River
- Pine River (Arenac County)

=== Major highways ===
- I-75
- US 23
- M-13
- M-33
- M-61
- M-65

=== Adjacent counties ===
By land

- Iosco County (northeast)
- Bay County (south)
- Gladwin County (west)
- Ogemaw County (northwest)

By water

- Tuscola County (south)
- Huron County (southeast)

=== National protected area ===
- Michigan Islands National Wildlife Refuge (part)

== Demographics ==
Historical population
Census	Pop.	Note	%±
1890	5,683		—
1900	9,821		72.8%
1910	9,640		−1.8%
1920	9,460		−1.9%
1930	8,007		−15.4%
1940	9,233		15.3%
1950	9,644		4.5%
1960	9,860		2.2%
1970	11,149		13.1%
1980	14,706		31.9%
1990	14,931		1.5%
2000	17,269		15.7%
2010	15,899		−7.9%
2020	15,002		−5.6%
2025 (est.)	15,068	▲	0.4%
US Decennial Census; 1790-1960 1900-1990; 1990-2000 2010-2018

=== Racial and ethnic composition ===
Arenac County, Michigan – Racial and ethnic composition Note: the US Census treats Hispanic/Latino as an ethnic category. This table excludes Latinos from the racial categories and assigns them to a separate category. Hispanics/Latinos may be of any race.
Race / Ethnicity (NH = Non-Hispanic)	Pop 1980	Pop 1990	Pop 2000	Pop 2010	Pop 2020	% 1980	% 1990	% 2000	% 2010	% 2020
White alone (NH)	14,429	14,577	16,298	15,231	13,919	98.12%	97.63%	94.38%	95.80%	92.78%
Black or African American alone (NH)	7	10	309	29	35	0.05%	0.07%	1.79%	0.18%	0.23%
Native American or Alaska Native alone (NH)	87	137	159	183	126	0.59%	0.92%	0.92%	1.15%	0.84%
Asian alone (NH)	20	38	50	29	38	0.14%	0.25%	0.29%	0.18%	0.25%
Native Hawaiian or Pacific Islander alone (NH)	x	x	1	9	1	x	x	0.01%	0.06%	0.01%
Other race alone (NH)	3	2	6	8	25	0.02%	0.01%	0.03%	0.05%	0.17%
Mixed race or Multiracial (NH)	x	x	208	185	588	x	x	1.20%	1.16%	3.92%
Hispanic or Latino (any race)	160	167	238	225	270	1.09%	1.12%	1.38%	1.42%	1.80%
Total	14,706	14,931	17,269	15,899	15,002	100.00%	100.00%	100.00%	100.00%	100.00%

=== 2020 census ===
As of the 2020 census, the county had a population of 15,002. The median age was 50.6 years. 17.8% of residents were under the age of 18 and 26.3% of residents were 65 years of age or older. For every 100 females there were 102.5 males, and for every 100 females age 18 and over there were 100.7 males age 18 and over.

The racial makeup of the county was 93.4% White, 0.2% Black or African American, 0.9% American Indian and Alaska Native, 0.3% Asian, <0.1% Native Hawaiian and Pacific Islander, 0.5% from some other race, and 4.7% from two or more races. Hispanic or Latino residents of any race comprised 1.8% of the population.

12.5% of residents lived in urban areas, while 87.5% lived in rural areas.

There were 6,631 households in the county, of which 22.2% had children under the age of 18 living in them. Of all households, 49.2% were married-couple households, 20.8% were households with a male householder and no spouse or partner present, and 22.3% were households with a female householder and no spouse or partner present. About 30.7% of all households were made up of individuals and 16.0% had someone living alone who was 65 years of age or older.

There were 9,504 housing units, of which 30.2% were vacant. Among occupied housing units, 83.6% were owner-occupied and 16.4% were renter-occupied. The homeowner vacancy rate was 1.4% and the rental vacancy rate was 6.1%.

=== 2000 census ===
As of the 2000 United States census, there were 17,269 people, 6,710 households, and 4,717 families in the county. The population density was 47 people per square mile (18 people/km^{2}). There were 9,563 housing units at an average density of 26 per square mile (10/km^{2}). The racial makeup of the county was 95.38% White, 1.82% Black or African American, 0.95% Native American, 0.29% Asian, 0.01% Pacific Islander, 0.21% from other races, and 1.33% from two or more races. 1.38% of the population were Hispanic or Latino of any race. 24.0% were of German, 14.1% Polish, 11.6% French, 10.6% American, 7.9% English, 6.8% Irish and 5.3% French Canadian ancestry. 96.9% spoke English and 1.3% Spanish as their first language.

There were 6,710 households, out of which 29.00% had children under the age of 18 living with them, 57.00% were married couples living together, 9.00% had a female householder with no husband present, and 29.70% were non-families. 25.50% of all households were made up of individuals, and 12.30% had someone living alone who was 65 years of age or older. The average household size was 2.45 and the average family size was 2.92.

The county population contained 23.30% under the age of 18, 7.80% from 18 to 24, 26.80% from 25 to 44, 25.50% from 45 to 64, and 16.60% who were 65 years of age or older. The median age was 40 years. For every 100 females there were 105.40 males. For every 100 females age 18 and over, there were 104.40 males.

The median income for a household in the county was $32,805, and the median income for a family was $39,033. Males had a median income of $31,205 versus $20,363 for females. The per capita income for the county was $16,300. About 11.30% of families and 13.90% of the population were below the poverty line, including 20.70% of those under age 18 and 7.80% of those age 65 or over.

=== Religion ===
- The Roman Catholic Diocese of Saginaw is the controlling regional body for the Catholic Church.
- There are no meetinghouses of the Church of Jesus Christ of Latter-day Saints located within Arenac County.

== Government ==
Arenac County could be described as slightly Republican-leaning. Since 1884, the Republican Party nominee has carried the county vote in 56% of the elections (20 of 36 elections). Due to 3 elections won by independent candidates during that period, the Democratic record is only 36% (12 of 36).

In 2024, Donald Trump won nearly 70% of the vote in Arenac County, the largest vote share any candidate has received in the county's history.

United States presidential election results for Arenac County, Michigan
Year	Republican		Democratic		Third party(ies)	
Year	No.	%	No.	%	No.	%
1884	323	31.95%	607	60.04%	81	8.01%
1888	357	31.85%	261	23.28%	503	44.87%
1892	322	27.81%	373	32.21%	463	39.98%
1896	611	37.39%	997	61.02%	26	1.59%
1900	972	51.02%	861	45.20%	72	3.78%
1904	1,372	68.77%	458	22.96%	165	8.27%
1908	1,081	56.19%	714	37.11%	129	6.70%
1912	421	21.17%	452	22.72%	1,116	56.11%
1916	911	46.86%	938	48.25%	95	4.89%
1920	1,521	66.36%	669	29.19%	102	4.45%
1924	1,767	67.57%	575	21.99%	273	10.44%
1928	1,612	67.87%	749	31.54%	14	0.59%
1932	1,471	40.13%	2,086	56.90%	109	2.97%
1936	1,505	43.50%	1,761	50.90%	194	5.61%
1940	2,293	60.23%	1,499	39.37%	15	0.39%
1944	1,978	60.47%	1,280	39.13%	13	0.40%
1948	1,790	58.86%	1,203	39.56%	48	1.58%
1952	2,753	67.74%	1,290	31.74%	21	0.52%
1956	2,631	63.32%	1,520	36.58%	4	0.10%
1960	2,352	55.34%	1,888	44.42%	10	0.24%
1964	1,413	36.68%	2,436	63.24%	3	0.08%
1968	2,089	52.37%	1,573	39.43%	327	8.20%
1972	2,588	57.43%	1,829	40.59%	89	1.98%
1976	2,687	49.55%	2,695	49.70%	41	0.76%
1980	3,436	53.43%	2,547	39.61%	448	6.97%
1984	3,483	58.63%	2,436	41.00%	22	0.37%
1988	3,064	48.63%	3,211	50.97%	25	0.40%
1992	2,330	32.33%	3,244	45.02%	1,632	22.65%
1996	2,247	34.09%	3,472	52.68%	872	13.23%
2000	3,421	47.08%	3,685	50.71%	161	2.22%
2004	4,071	49.55%	4,076	49.61%	69	0.84%
2008	3,807	46.84%	4,155	51.12%	166	2.04%
2012	4,057	51.74%	3,669	46.79%	115	1.47%
2016	4,950	64.04%	2,384	30.84%	395	5.11%
2020	5,928	67.07%	2,774	31.38%	137	1.55%
2024	6,379	69.65%	2,662	29.07%	117	1.28%

United States Senate election results for Arenac County, Michigan1
Year	Republican		Democratic		Third party(ies)	
Year	No.	%	No.	%	No.	%
2024	5,911	66.13%	2,786	31.17%	241	2.70%

Michigan Gubernatorial election results for Arenac County
Year	Republican		Democratic		Third party(ies)	
Year	No.	%	No.	%	No.	%
2022	4,314	60.17%	2,709	37.78%	147	2.05%

The county government operates the jail, maintains rural roads, operates the major local courts, records deeds, mortgages, and vital records, administers public health regulations, and participates with the state in the provision of social services. The county board of commissioners controls the budget and has limited authority to make laws or ordinances. In Michigan, most local government functions — police and fire, building and zoning, tax assessment, street maintenance, etc. — are the responsibility of individual cities and townships.

=== Elected officials ===
- Prosecuting Attorney: Curtis Broughton
- Sheriff: Jim Mosciski
- County Clerk: Ricky R. Rockwell
- County Treasurer: Dennis Stawowy
- Register of Deeds: Darlene Mikkola
- Drain Commissioner: Jeff Trombley
- Road Commissioners: Blair Dyer-Superintendent; Ken Stawowy-V. Chair; Lewis Ostrander; Olen Swartz-Chair

(information as of March 2009)

== Communities ==
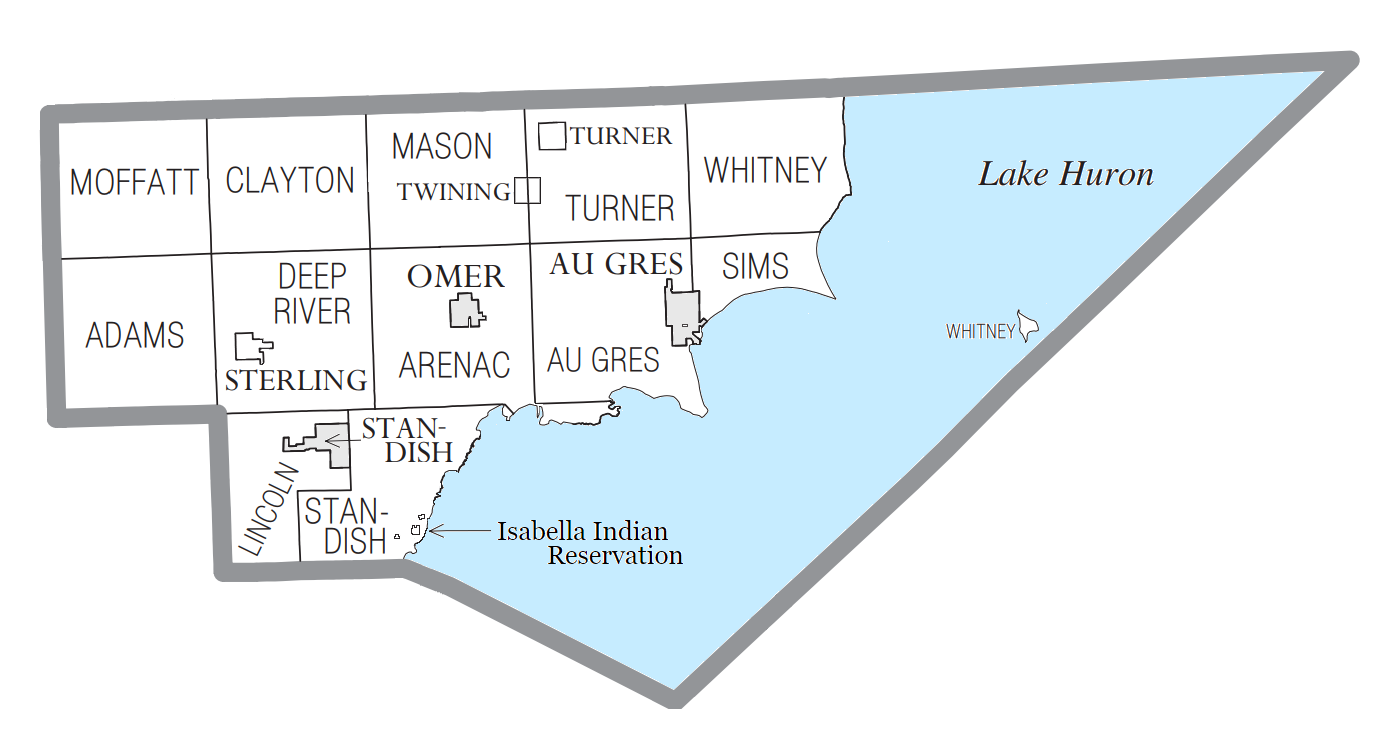
U.S. Census data map showing local municipal boundaries within Arenac County. Shaded areas represent incorporated cities.

=== Cities ===
- Au Gres
- Omer
- Standish (county seat)

=== Villages ===
- Sterling
- Turner
- Twining

=== Civil townships ===
- Adams Township
- Arenac Township
- Au Gres Township
- Clayton Township
- Deep River Township
- Lincoln Township
- Mason Township
- Moffatt Township
- Sims Township
- Standish Township
- Turner Township
- Whitney Township

=== Unincorporated communities ===
- Alger
- Delano
- Maple Ridge
- Melita
- Pine River

=== Indian reservation ===
- Arenac County contains off-reservation trust land belonging to the Isabella Indian Reservation. They occupy three small parcels of land located within Standish Township.

== Events ==
- Sunrise Side Heritage Bike Ride, first weekend in September. Ride Along Lake Huron Shoreline (US 23) from the Arenac County fairgrounds to Mackinac Bridge then South to West Branch on M-33 and M-55 . This is a 400-mile long organized ride.

== See also ==
- List of Michigan State Historic Sites in Arenac County, Michigan
- National Register of Historic Places listings in Arenac County, Michigan
- USS Arenac (APA-128)
