= Sterling, Michigan =

- Village
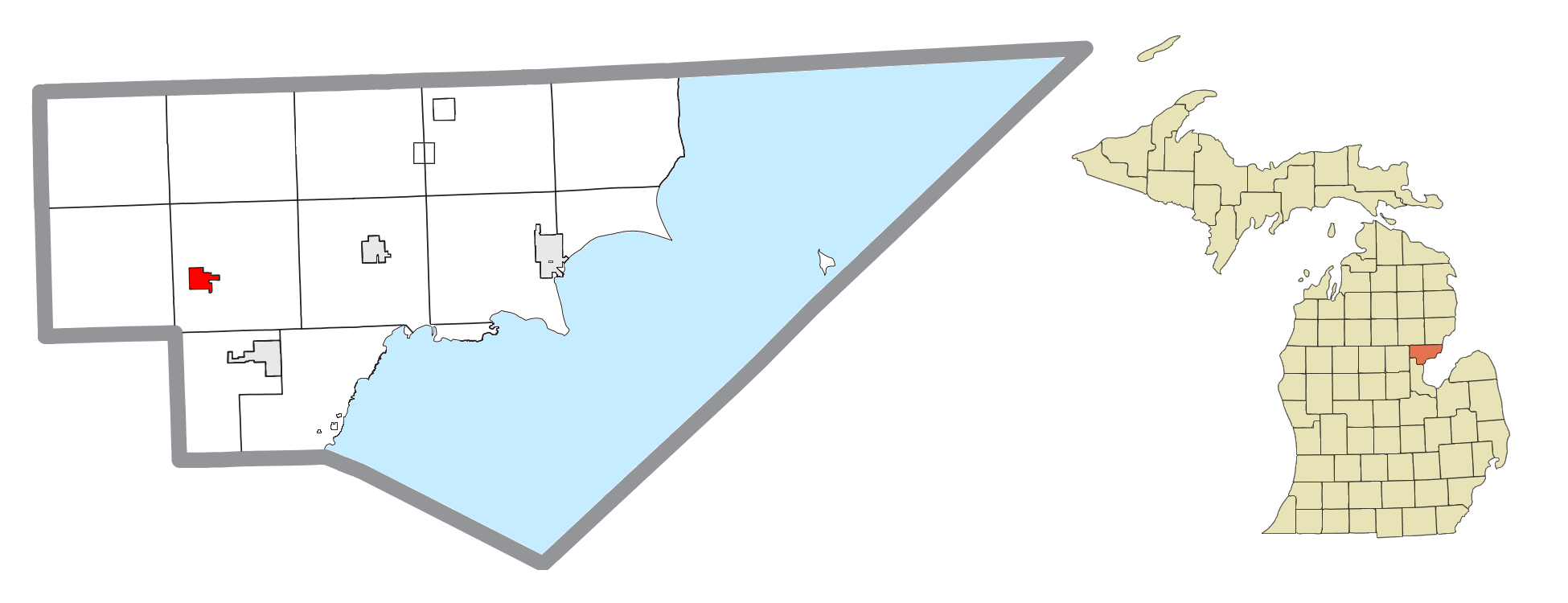
- Location within Arenac County
- Coordinates: 44°01′56″N 84°01′13″W
- Country: United States
- State: Michigan
- County: Arenac
- Township: Deep River

Area
  - Total: 0.98 sq mi (2.54 km^{2})
  - Land: 0.98 sq mi (2.53 km^{2})
  - Water: 0.0039 sq mi (0.01 km^{2})
- Elevation: 748 ft (228 m)

Population (2020)
  - Total: 474
  - Density: 485.0/sq mi (187.26/km^{2})
- Time zone: UTC-5 (Eastern (EST))
  - Summer (DST): UTC-4 (EDT)
- ZIP code(s): 48659
- Area code: 989
- FIPS code: 26-76420
- GNIS feature ID: 0638795
- Website: https://villageofsterling.org/

Sterling is a village in Arenac County in the U.S. state of Michigan. The population was 474 at the 2020 census. The village is located within Deep River Township.

== Geography ==
According to the United States Census Bureau, the village has a total area of 0.98 square miles (2.54 km^{2}), all land.

== Demographics ==
Historical population
Census	Pop.	Note	%±
1930	279		—
1940	350		25.4%
1950	444		26.9%
1960	470		5.9%
1970	507		7.9%
1980	457		−9.9%
1990	520		13.8%
2000	533		2.5%
2010	530		−0.6%
2020	474		−10.6%
U.S. Decennial Census

=== 2010 census ===
As of the census of 2010, there were 530 people, 185 households, and 134 families residing in the village. The population density was 540.8 inhabitants per square mile (208.8/km^{2}). There were 206 housing units at an average density of 210.2 per square mile (81.2/km^{2}). The racial makeup of the village was 97.0% White, 0.9% Native American, 0.2% from other races, and 1.9% from two or more races. Hispanic or Latino of any race were 1.7% of the population.

There were 185 households, of which 36.8% had children under the age of 18 living with them, 49.2% were married couples living together, 13.0% had a female householder with no husband present, 10.3% had a male householder with no wife present, and 27.6% were non-families. 24.9% of all households were made up of individuals, and 11.3% had someone living alone who was 65 years of age or older. The average household size was 2.47 and the average family size was 2.85.

The median age in the village was 42.7 years. 21.7% of residents were under the age of 18; 6.5% were between the ages of 18 and 24; 24.2% were from 25 to 44; 22.8% were from 45 to 64; and 24.9% were 65 years of age or older. The gender makeup of the village was 50.9% male and 49.1% female.

=== 2000 census ===
As of the census of 2000, there were 533 people, 185 households, and 132 families residing in the village. The population density was 532.1 inhabitants per square mile (205.4/km^{2}). There were 197 housing units at an average density of 196.7 per square mile (75.9/km^{2}). The racial makeup of the village was 97.56% White, 0.38% Native American, 0.38% from other races, and 1.69% from two or more races. Hispanic or Latino of any race were 1.13% of the population.

There were 185 households, out of which 33.0% had children under the age of 18 living with them, 54.1% were married couples living together, 9.7% had a female householder with no husband present, and 28.6% were non-families. 25.9% of all households were made up of individuals, and 13.0% had someone living alone who was 65 years of age or older. The average household size was 2.44 and the average family size was 2.88.

In the village, the population was spread out, with 21.0% under the age of 18, 7.7% from 18 to 24, 26.1% from 25 to 44, 16.3% from 45 to 64, and 28.9% who were 65 years of age or older. The median age was 41 years. For every 100 females, there were 91.0 males. For every 100 females age 18 and over, there were 87.1 males. The median income for a household in the village was $34,583, and the median income for a family was $36,042. Males had a median income of $26,563 versus $21,875 for females. The per capita income for the village was $14,181. About 11.9% of families and 9.8% of the population were below the poverty line, including 12.0% of those under age 18 and 3.6% of those age 65 or over.

== Highways ==
- M-76
