= Mason Township, Arenac County, Michigan =

Mason Township, Michigan
- Civil township
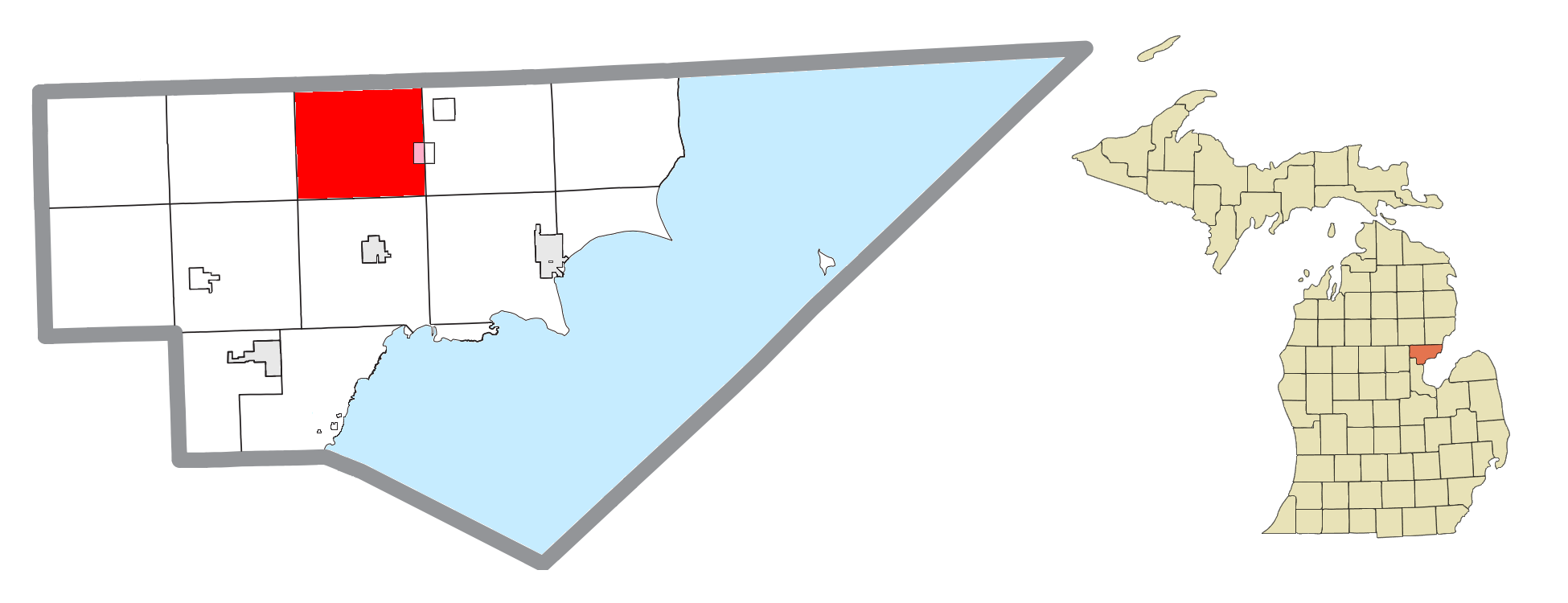
- Location within Arenac County (red) and an administered portion of the village of Twining (pink)

- Location within the state of Michigan Mason Township (the United States)
- Coordinates: 44°07′40″N 83°51′31″W
- Country: United States
- State: Michigan
- County: Arenac

Government
  - Supervisor: Mark Heideman

Area
  - Total: 32.1 sq mi (83.1 km^{2})
  - Land: 32.0 sq mi (83.0 km^{2})
  - Water: 0.039 sq mi (0.1 km^{2})
- Elevation: 745 ft (227 m)

Population (2020)
  - Total: 750
  - Density: 23/sq mi (9.0/km^{2})
- Time zone: UTC-5 (Eastern (EST))
  - Summer (DST): UTC-4 (EDT)
- ZIP code(s): 48766
- Area code: 989
- FIPS code: 26-52120
- GNIS feature ID: 1626704

Mason Township is a civil township of Arenac County in the U.S. state of Michigan. The population was 750 at the 2020 census. The western portion of the village of Twining is located within the township.

== Geography ==
According to the United States Census Bureau, the township has a total area of 32.1 square miles (83.1 km^{2}), of which 32.0 square miles (83.0 km^{2}) is land and 0.039 square miles (0.1 km^{2}), or 0.09%, is water.

== Demographics ==
As of the census of 2000, there were 994 people, 359 households, and 268 families residing in the township. The population density was 31.0 inhabitants per square mile (12.0/km^{2}). There were 442 housing units at an average density of 13.8 per square mile (5.3/km^{2}). The racial makeup of the township was 95.57% White, 0.20% African American, 1.21% Native American, 0.10% from other races, and 2.92% from two or more races. Hispanic or Latino of any race were 1.01% of the population.

There were 359 households, out of which 38.4% had children under the age of 18 living with them, 56.3% were married couples living together, 12.5% had a female householder with no husband present, and 25.3% were non-families. 21.2% of all households were made up of individuals, and 7.5% had someone living alone who was 65 years of age or older. The average household size was 2.77 and the average family size was 3.21.

In the township the population was spread out, with 31.5% under the age of 18, 7.4% from 18 to 24, 26.3% from 25 to 44, 24.1% from 45 to 64, and 10.7% who were 65 years of age or older. The median age was 36 years. For every 100 females, there were 100.4 males. For every 100 females age 18 and over, there were 104.5 males.

The median income for a household in the township was $30,357, and the median income for a family was $33,333. Males had a median income of $29,519 versus $19,821 for females. The per capita income for the township was $12,991. About 13.3% of families and 17.0% of the population were below the poverty line, including 22.5% of those under age 18 and 4.6% of those age 65 or over.
