= Standish, Michigan =

- City
- City of Standish
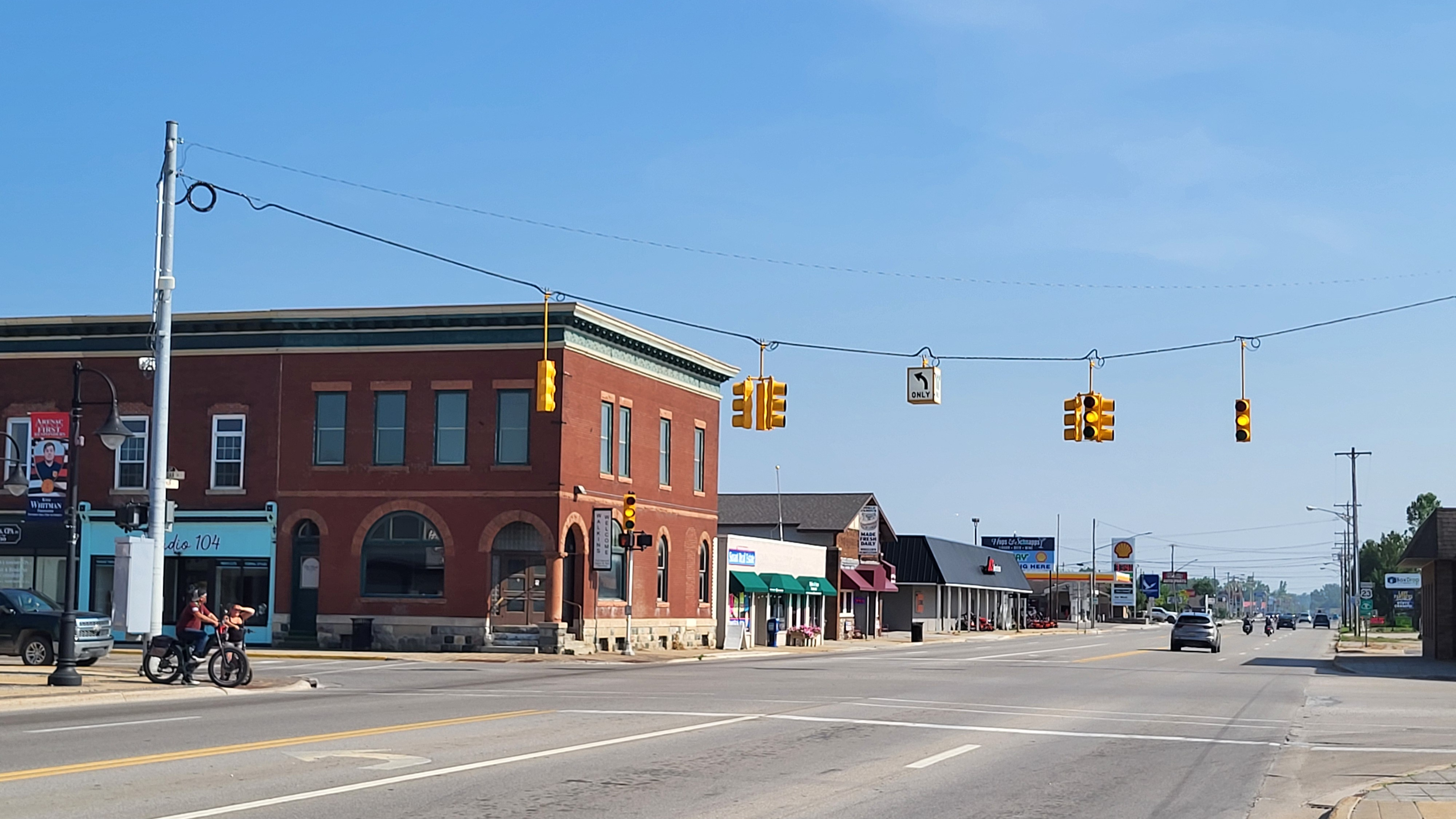
- Looking south along US 23 at Cedar Street

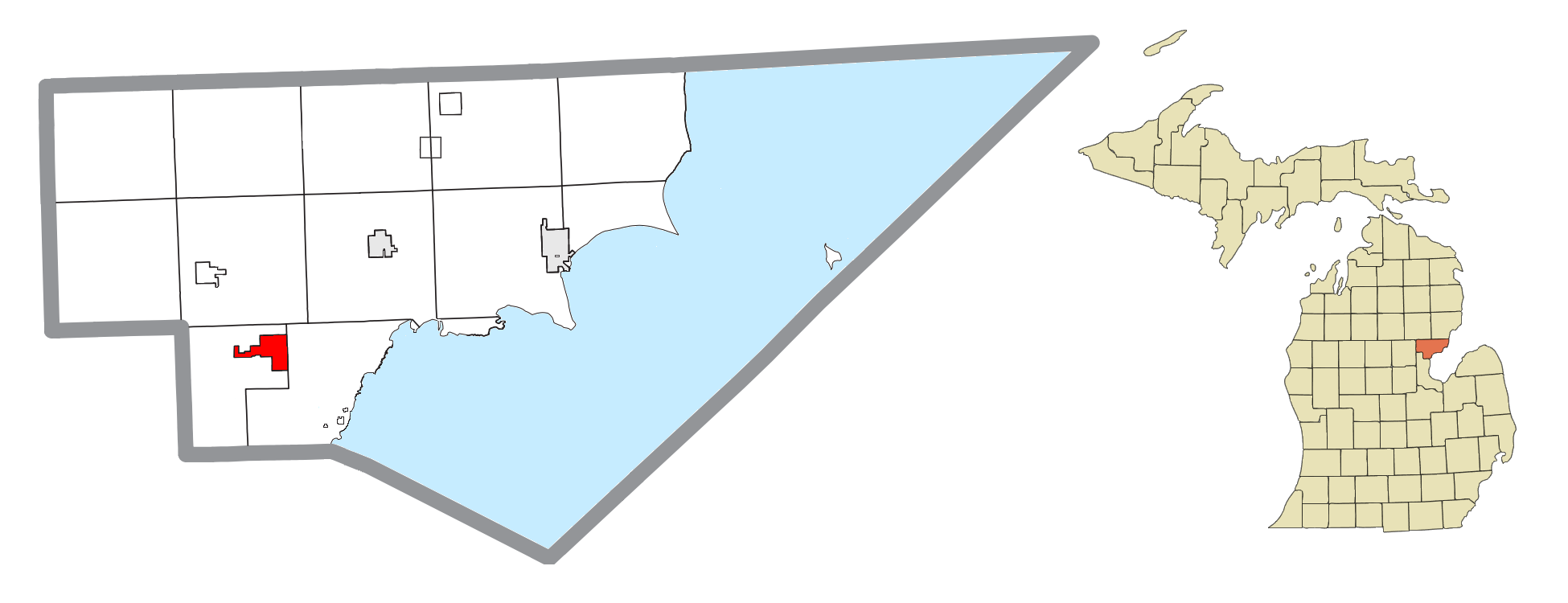
- Location within Arenac County

- Location within the state of Michigan Location within the United States
- Coordinates: 43°58′59″N 83°57′32″W
- Country: United States
- State: Michigan
- County: Arenac
- Incorporated: 1893 (village); 1903 (city)

Government
  - Type: Council–manager
  - Mayor: Kevin King
  - City manager: Gerald Nelson

Area
  - Total: 2.18 sq mi (5.64 km^{2})
  - Land: 2.18 sq mi (5.64 km^{2})
  - Water: 0 sq mi (0.00 km^{2})
- Elevation: 620 ft (190 m)

Population (2020)
  - Total: 1,458
  - Density: 669.4/sq mi (258.46/km^{2})
- Time zone: UTC-5 (Eastern (EST))
  - Summer (DST): UTC-4 (EDT)
- ZIP code(s): 48658
- Area code: 989
- FIPS code: 26-76120
- GNIS feature ID: 638715
- Website: Official website

Standish is a city in and the county seat of Arenac County, Michigan. The population was 1,458 at the 2020 census.

== History ==
The town was platted by John D. Standish in 1871, who owned all of the land in the vicinity. Before the plat was formally recorded, Standish sold off some of his land in the area. The town was initially named Granton. John Standish owned the town's first business, a sawmill. He later had the town name changed back to Standish. Jackson and Lansing Railroad reached the community in 1871. The first hotel was built in Standish in 1871 and named The Standish House, by a sheriff of Bay County. The hotel went through several owners before it burned down in March 1902. In 1888 the railroad depot was built by local farmers in the area, each bringing their own materials to help with the construction. In 1898 the State Bank of Standish opened, (now Citizens Bank). Standish was incorporated as a village in 1893 with James Austin as its president, and later a city in 1903, with Mr. H. Randall as its first mayor. In 1907 Standish got its first automobile dealership, a Buick dealership. By 1912 the city got its first commercial electric lighting for homes and businesses, with power being available between 7 a.m. and midnight. By 1926 the city was receiving 24-hour electricity service supplied by the Northern Power Company. In 1918, the first gravel road between Pinconning and Standish was built, being a loose dirt road beforehand. The same year that prohibition on alcohol took effect, 1920, three illegal moonshine stills were confiscated by the sheriff, and local arrests were made. By 1938 the population of Standish was 913. The city received the deed to Woodmere Cemetery in 1940. On September 22, 1970, the charter of the city of Standish was adopted, making Standish a home-rule city.

== Geography ==
According to the United States Census Bureau, the city has a total area of 2.15 square miles (5.57 km^{2}), all land.

Standish is located roughly 5.2 miles from the Saginaw Bay.

=== Climate ===
Climate data for Standish, Michigan (1991–2020 normals, extremes 1895–present)
Month	Jan	Feb	Mar	Apr	May	Jun	Jul	Aug	Sep	Oct	Nov	Dec	Year
Record high °F (°C)	59 (15)	63 (17)	85 (29)	89 (32)	96 (36)	100 (38)	100 (38)	100 (38)	99 (37)	91 (33)	79 (26)	67 (19)	100 (38)
Mean daily maximum °F (°C)	28.2 (−2.1)	30.3 (−0.9)	40.2 (4.6)	53.2 (11.8)	65.9 (18.8)	75.8 (24.3)	80.1 (26.7)	78.3 (25.7)	71.5 (21.9)	58.5 (14.7)	44.8 (7.1)	33.6 (0.9)	55.0 (12.8)
Daily mean °F (°C)	21.1 (−6.1)	22.2 (−5.4)	31.5 (−0.3)	43.1 (6.2)	55.1 (12.8)	65.0 (18.3)	69.2 (20.7)	67.5 (19.7)	60.2 (15.7)	48.8 (9.3)	37.6 (3.1)	27.8 (−2.3)	45.8 (7.7)
Mean daily minimum °F (°C)	14.0 (−10.0)	14.1 (−9.9)	22.9 (−5.1)	33.1 (0.6)	44.2 (6.8)	54.2 (12.3)	58.3 (14.6)	56.7 (13.7)	49.0 (9.4)	39.2 (4.0)	30.4 (−0.9)	22.1 (−5.5)	36.5 (2.5)
Record low °F (°C)	−27 (−33)	−28 (−33)	−21 (−29)	5 (−15)	19 (−7)	29 (−2)	36 (2)	31 (−1)	23 (−5)	12 (−11)	−11 (−24)	−22 (−30)	−28 (−33)
Average precipitation inches (mm)	1.61 (41)	1.43 (36)	1.50 (38)	3.31 (84)	3.52 (89)	3.55 (90)	2.92 (74)	3.53 (90)	2.63 (67)	2.68 (68)	2.41 (61)	1.58 (40)	30.67 (779)
Average precipitation days (≥ 0.01 in)	11.2	8.1	8.9	11.6	10.9	9.9	10.1	10.3	9.1	10.9	10.3	11.3	122.6
Source: NOAA

== Demographics ==
Historical population
Census	Pop.	Note	%±
1880	246		—
1890	611		148.4%
1900	829		35.7%
1910	828		−0.1%
1920	795		−4.0%
1930	803		1.0%
1940	981		22.2%
1950	1,186		20.9%
1960	1,214		2.4%
1970	1,184		−2.5%
1980	1,264		6.8%
1990	1,377		8.9%
2000	1,581		14.8%
2010	1,509		−4.6%
2020	1,458		−3.4%
U.S. Decennial Census

=== 2010 census ===
As of the census of 2010, there were 1,509 people, 619 households, and 353 families living in the city. The population density was 701.9 inhabitants per square mile (271.0/km^{2}). There were 682 housing units at an average density of 317.2 per square mile (122.5/km^{2}). The racial makeup of the city was 95.3% White, 0.5% African American, 1.5% Native American, 0.4% Asian, 0.7% from other races, and 1.6% from two or more races. Hispanic or Latino of any race were 2.6% of the population.

There were 619 households, of which 30.2% had children under the age of 18 living with them, 36.7% were married couples living together, 14.7% had a female householder with no husband present, 5.7% had a male householder with no wife present, and 43.0% were non-families. 36.7% of all households were made up of individuals, and 16.3% had someone living alone who was 65 years of age or older. The average household size was 2.27 and the average family size was 2.96.

The median age in the city was 40 years. 23.6% of residents were under the age of 18; 8.7% were between the ages of 18 and 24; 24.2% were from 25 to 44; 25.7% were from 45 to 64; and 17.8% were 65 years of age or older. The gender makeup of the city was 48.1% male and 51.9% female.

=== 2000 census ===
As of the census of 2000, there were 1,581 people, 619 households, and 362 families living in the city. The population density was 738.1 inhabitants per square mile (285.0/km^{2}). There were 672 housing units at an average density of 313.7 per square mile (121.1/km^{2}). The racial makeup of the city was 96.52% White, 0.25% African American, 0.63% Native American, 0.89% Asian, 0.82% from other races, and 0.89% from two or more races. Hispanic or Latino of any race were 2.02% of the population.

There were 619 households, out of which 32.1% had children under the age of 18 living with them, 39.4% were married couples living together, 14.2% had a female householder with no husband present, and 41.4% were non-families. 37.5% of all households were made up of individuals, and 20.2% had someone living alone who was 65 years of age or older. The average household size was 2.36 and the average family size was 3.08.

In the city, the population was spread out, with 26.2% under the age of 18, 9.2% from 18 to 24, 27.5% from 25 to 44, 19.0% from 45 to 64, and 18.2% who were 65 years of age or older. The median age was 37 years. For every 100 females, there were 82.6 males. For every 100 females age 18 and over, there were 78.4 males.

The median income for a household in the city was $22,212, and the median income for a family was $31,719. Males had a median income of $28,523 versus $20,333 for females. The per capita income for the city was $13,608. About 16.4% of families and 19.1% of the population were below the poverty line, including 18.5% of those under age 18 and 14.7% of those age 65 or over.

== Economy ==
=== Correctional Facility ===
Standish is home to the state Standish Maximum Correctional Facility, which operated from 1990 through 2009. In late 2009 the facility was briefly considered as a potential United States site for more than 220 prisoners to be relocated from the Guantanamo Bay detention camp, although neighbors and local residents expressed concern and opposition. At the time, Michigan public officials, including both of its senators (Carl Levin and Debbie Stabenow) and governor Jennifer Granholm, also objected to the idea.

== Infrastructure ==
=== Major highways ===
- I-75
- US 23
- M-13
- M-61

=== Bus ===
- Indian Trails provides daily intercity bus service between St. Ignace and Bay City, Michigan.

== Education ==
The city of Standish is in the Standish-Sterling Community Schools District. There is one elementary school: Standish-Sterling Elementary located in Sterling. Standish-Sterling Middle School operates in the former Standish-Sterling High School. A new high school, Standish-Sterling Central High School, opened in 2001.
