= Clayton Township, Arenac County, Michigan =

Clayton Township, Michigan
- Civil township
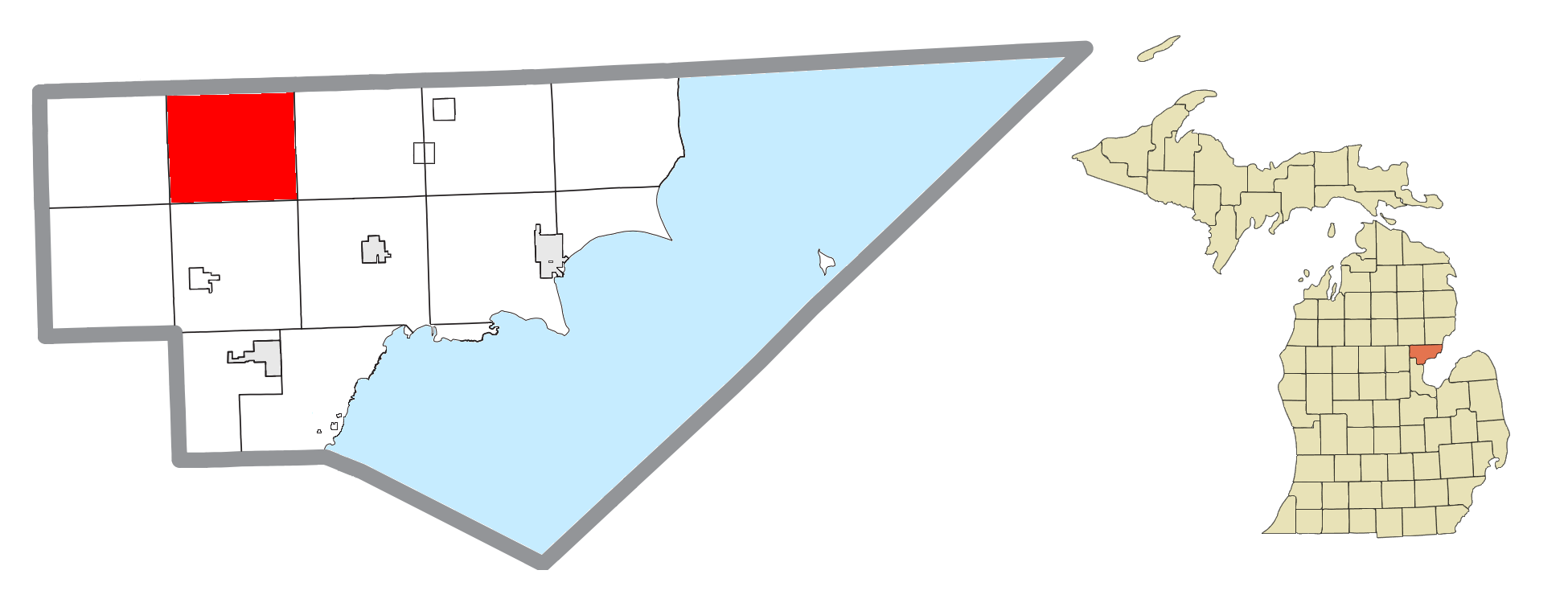
- Location within Arenac County

- Location within the state of Michigan Clayton Township (the United States)
- Coordinates: 44°08′04″N 83°59′51″W
- Country: United States
- State: Michigan
- County: Arenac

Government
  - Supervisor: Byron Fogarasi

Area
  - Total: 32.2 sq mi (83.3 km^{2})
  - Land: 32.0 sq mi (83.0 km^{2})
  - Water: 0.077 sq mi (0.2 km^{2})
- Elevation: 837 ft (255 m)

Population (2020)
  - Total: 1,001
  - Density: 31.2/sq mi (12.1/km^{2})
- Time zone: UTC-5 (Eastern (EST))
  - Summer (DST): UTC-4 (EDT)
- ZIP code(s): 48659, 48749, 48766
- Area code: 989
- FIPS code: 26-16240
- GNIS feature ID: 1626092
- Website: Official website

Clayton Township is a civil township of Arenac County in the U.S. state of Michigan. The population was 1,001 at the 2020 census.

== Geography ==
According to the United States Census Bureau, the township has a total area of 32.2 square miles (83.3 km^{2}), of which 32.0 square miles (83.0 km^{2}) is land and 0.077 square miles (0.2 km^{2}), or 0.26%, is water.

== Demographics ==
At the 2000 census, there were 1,101 people, 416 households and 311 families residing in the township. The population density was 34.3 inhabitants per square mile (13.2/km^{2}). There were 508 housing units at an average density of 15.8 per square mile (6.1/km^{2}). The racial makeup of the township was 98.82% White, 0.73% Native American, 0.09% Asian, and 0.36% from two or more races. Hispanic or Latino of any race were 0.36% of the population.

There were 416 households, of which 32.7% had children under the age of 18 living with them, 57.2% were married couples living together, 12.0% had a female householder with no husband present, and 25.2% were non-families. 21.6% of all households were made up of individuals, and 9.6% had someone living alone who was 65 years of age or older. The average household size was 2.65 and the average family size was 3.00.

Age distribution was 26.2% under the age of 18, 9.3% from 18 to 24, 27.2% from 25 to 44, 25.5% from 45 to 64, and 11.9% who were 65 years of age or older. The median age was 38 years. For every 100 females, there were 106.2 males. For every 100 females age 18 and over, there were 97.8 males.

The median household income was $32,500, and the median family income was $36,731. Males had a median income of $34,063 versus $17,500 for females. The per capita income for the township was $14,494. About 11.3% of families and 14.7% of the population were below the poverty line, including 22.5% of those under age 18 and 3.9% of those age 65 or over.
