= Rose Township, Michigan =

Rose Township may refer to the following places in the U.S. state of Michigan:

- Rose Township, Oakland County, Michigan
- Rose Township, Ogemaw County, Michigan

== See also ==
- Rose Lake Township, Michigan, in Osceola County
- Rose Township (disambiguation)
