= WMSD =

Coordinates: 44.433°N 84.009°W

- Rose Township, Michigan; United States
- Broadcast area
- Frequency: 90.9 MHz
- Branding: Bible Believing Radio

Programming
- Format: Fundamentalist Christianity

Ownership
- Owner: Bible Baptist Church

History
- First air date: August 11, 2000
- Call sign meaning: We Magnify Sound Doctrine

Technical information
- Licensing authority: FCC
- Class: A
- Power: 5,000 watts

Links
- Public license information: Public file; LMS

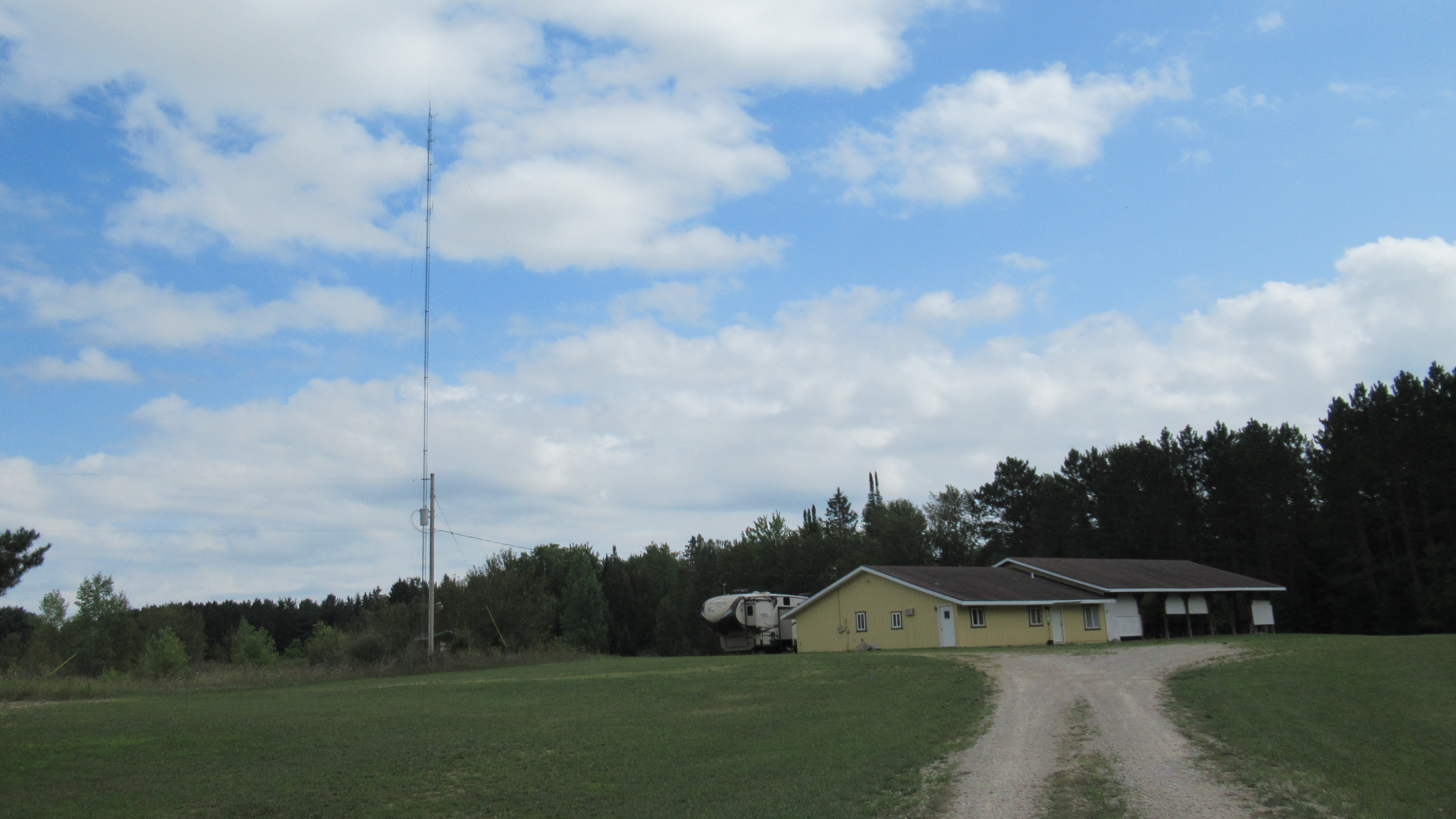
WMSD broadcasting tower near Lupton

WMSD (90.9 FM) is an FM radio station licensed to Rose Township, Michigan. The station proper is located in the town of Lupton, Michigan.

In July 2000, a construction permit was issued and by August 11, 2000 the station began broadcasting at 90.9 FM.

The station was originally an affiliate of the Fundamental Broadcasting Network, located in New Bern, North Carolina. In March 2005, the station began local programming via its own automation system, allowing the station to control its own programming schedule.

The station is a ministry of Bible Baptist Church of Lupton, Michigan.
