= Rosetown =

Rosetown may refer to:

== Places ==
- Rosetown, South Australia, locality in South Australia
- Rosetown, Saskatchewan, town in Saskatchewan, Canada
  - Rosetown Airport

== Electoral districts in Saskatchewan ==
- Rosetown (federal electoral district), former federal electoral district (1925-1935)
- Rosetown (provincial electoral district), former provincial electoral district (1912-1975)
- Rosetown—Biggar (federal electoral district), a federal electoral district in Saskatchewan, Canada
- Rosetown–Biggar (provincial electoral district), a provincial electoral district in Saskatchewan, Canada
- Rosetown-Elrose, provincial electoral district (since 2003)
- Saskatoon—Rosetown—Biggar, former federal electoral district (1997-2015)

== See also ==
- Rose Township (disambiguation)
- Rosemont (disambiguation)
