= Lupton, Michigan =

- Census-designated place (CDP) & unincorporated community
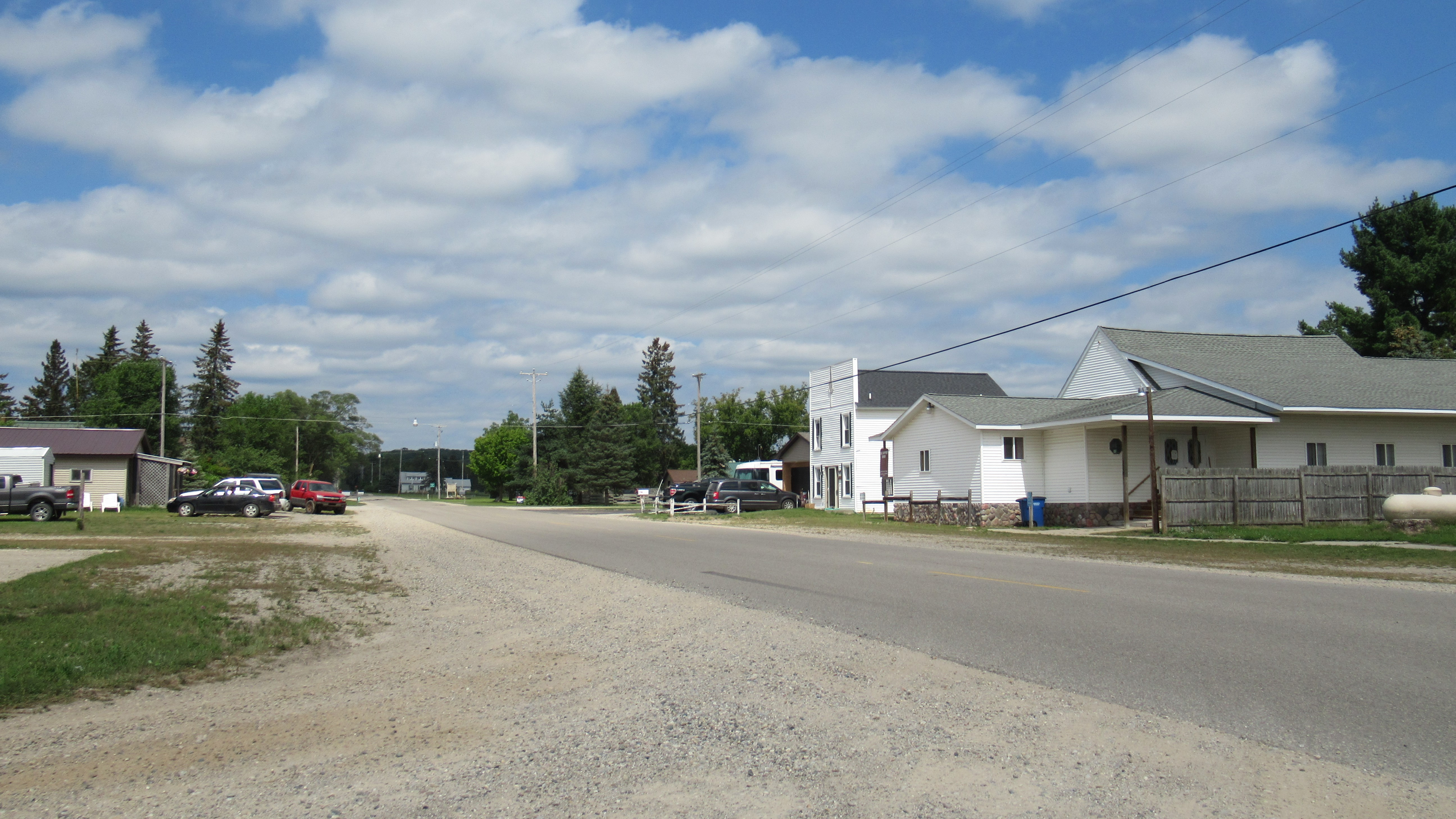
- Looking north along Main Street

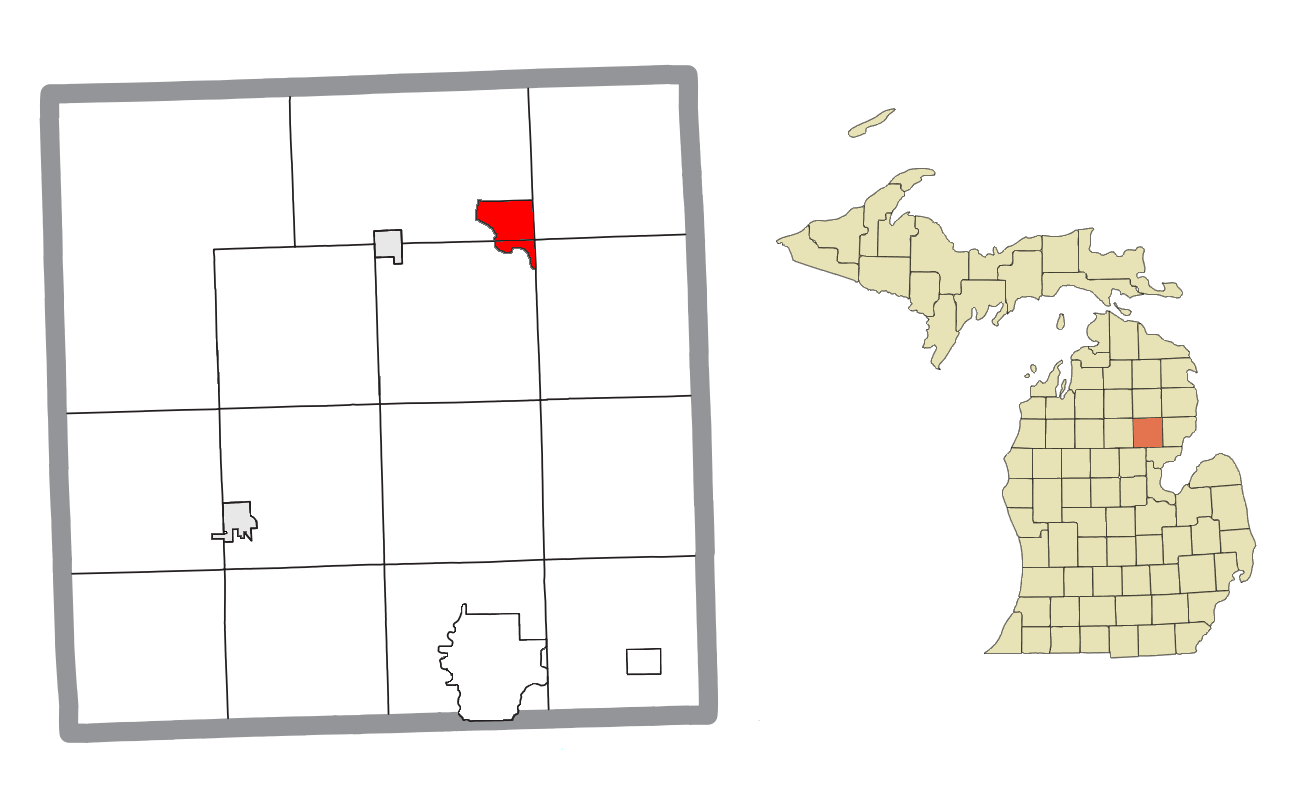
- Location within Ogemaw County

- Location within the state of Michigan Location within the United States
- Coordinates: 44°25′52″N 84°01′33″W
- Country: United States
- State: Michigan
- County: Ogemaw
- Townships: Cumming and Rose
- Settled: 1880

Area
  - Total: 3.26 sq mi (8.45 km^{2})
  - Land: 3.23 sq mi (8.37 km^{2})
  - Water: 0.031 sq mi (0.08 km^{2})
- Elevation: 922 ft (281 m)

Population (2020)
  - Total: 318
  - Density: 98.4/sq mi (37.99/km^{2})
- Time zone: UTC-5 (Eastern (EST))
  - Summer (DST): UTC-4 (EDT)
- ZIP code(s): 48635
- Area code: 989
- GNIS feature ID: 1620647

Lupton is an unincorporated community and census-designated place (CDP) in Ogemaw County in the U.S. state of Michigan. The population of the CDP was 318 at the 2020 census. Lupton is located mostly within Rose Township with a small portion extending south into Cumming Township.

== History ==
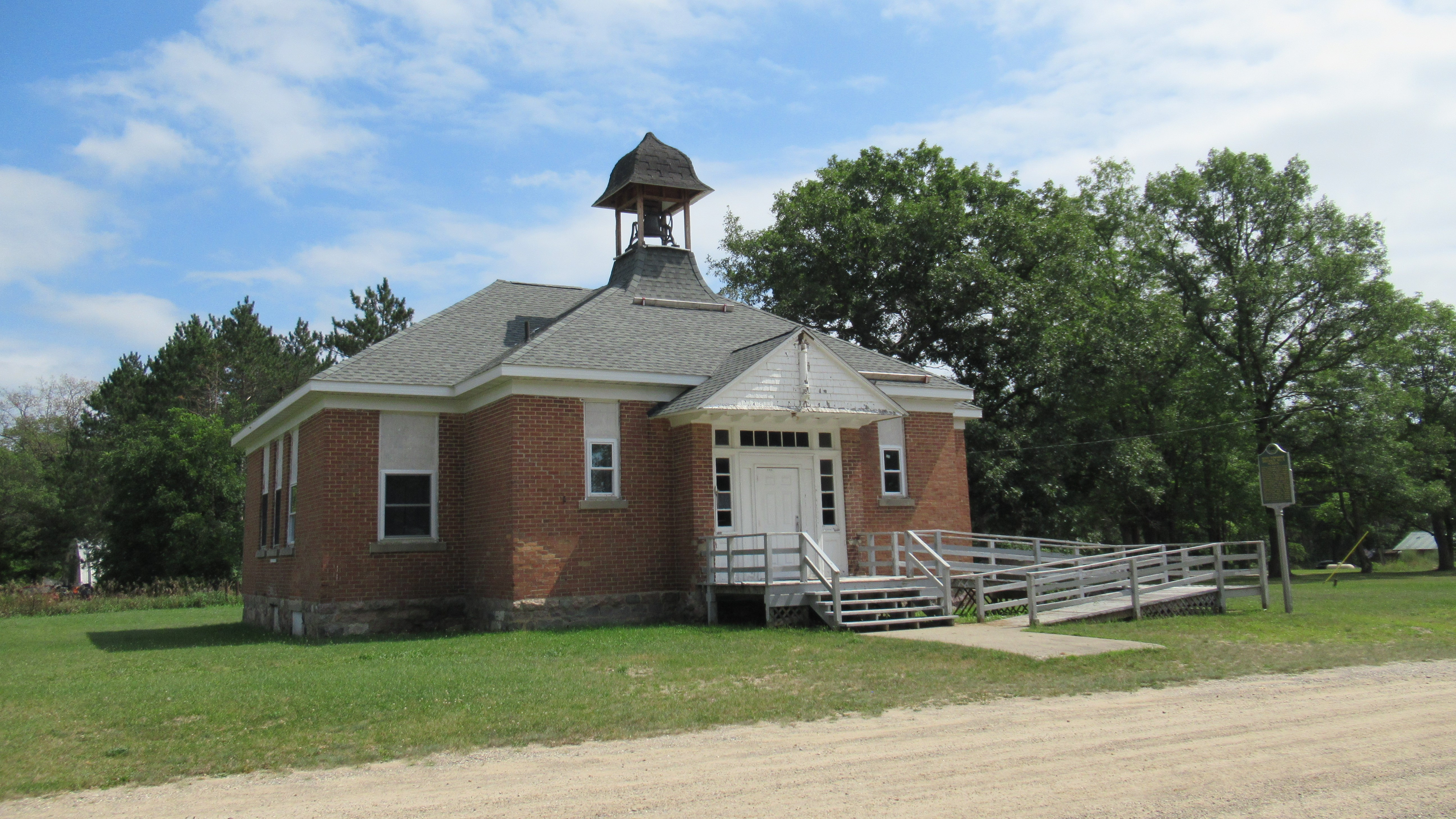
Rose Township District No. 5 School

Lupton was settled as early as 1880 by several Quaker families from Ohio, including that of Emmor Lupton. The community was first known as Lane Heights and given a post office under the name Lane on April 11, 1881. A depot on the Detroit, Bay City and Alpena Railroad was opened in January 1893. The post office was renamed Lupton in June 1893. The post office name changed to Lupton on June 8, 1893.

The Lupton Schoolhouse was constructed from 1903–1904 and served Lupton as the Rose Township District No. 5 School. The two-room schoolhouse remained in operation until 1963. The site was dedicated as a Michigan State Historic Site on April 20, 1995.

The community of Lupton was listed as a newly-organized census-designated place for the 2010 census, meaning it now has officially defined boundaries and population statistics for the first time.

The post office remained in operation until it was discontinued on November 5, 2011. Although the community contains no post office, the Lupton 48635 ZIP Code remains active is now served by the Rose City post office.

== Geography ==
According to the U.S. Census Bureau, the community has an area of 3.26 square miles (8.44 km^{2}), of which 3.23 square miles (8.37 km^{2}) is land and 0.03 square miles (0.08 km^{2}) (0.92%) is water.

The Rifle River flows through Lupton, and the Rifle River State Recreation Area is just to the south and use the Lupton ZIP Code.

=== Climate ===
Climate data for Lupton 1S, Michigan (1991–2020 normals, extremes 1951–present)
Month	Jan	Feb	Mar	Apr	May	Jun	Jul	Aug	Sep	Oct	Nov	Dec	Year
Record high °F (°C)	56 (13)	61 (16)	87 (31)	89 (32)	96 (36)	105 (41)	102 (39)	102 (39)	98 (37)	89 (32)	75 (24)	66 (19)	105 (41)
Mean daily maximum °F (°C)	27.0 (−2.8)	30.9 (−0.6)	41.0 (5.0)	54.4 (12.4)	67.5 (19.7)	76.9 (24.9)	81.0 (27.2)	79.1 (26.2)	72.1 (22.3)	57.7 (14.3)	43.8 (6.6)	32.5 (0.3)	55.3 (12.9)
Daily mean °F (°C)	18.5 (−7.5)	19.9 (−6.7)	29.1 (−1.6)	41.7 (5.4)	53.9 (12.2)	63.2 (17.3)	67.4 (19.7)	65.7 (18.7)	58.3 (14.6)	46.3 (7.9)	35.1 (1.7)	25.1 (−3.8)	43.7 (6.5)
Mean daily minimum °F (°C)	10.0 (−12.2)	8.9 (−12.8)	17.2 (−8.2)	29.0 (−1.7)	40.2 (4.6)	49.5 (9.7)	53.8 (12.1)	52.3 (11.3)	44.6 (7.0)	35.0 (1.7)	26.4 (−3.1)	17.7 (−7.9)	32.1 (0.1)
Record low °F (°C)	−34 (−37)	−41 (−41)	−29 (−34)	−4 (−20)	17 (−8)	25 (−4)	30 (−1)	26 (−3)	20 (−7)	11 (−12)	−12 (−24)	−25 (−32)	−41 (−41)
Average precipitation inches (mm)	1.83 (46)	1.58 (40)	1.94 (49)	3.11 (79)	3.49 (89)	3.80 (97)	3.52 (89)	3.33 (85)	2.90 (74)	3.28 (83)	2.49 (63)	2.14 (54)	33.41 (849)
Source: NOAA

== Demographics ==
Historical population
Census	Pop.	Note	%±
2020	318		—
U.S. Decennial Census
