= Cumming Township, Michigan =

- Civil township
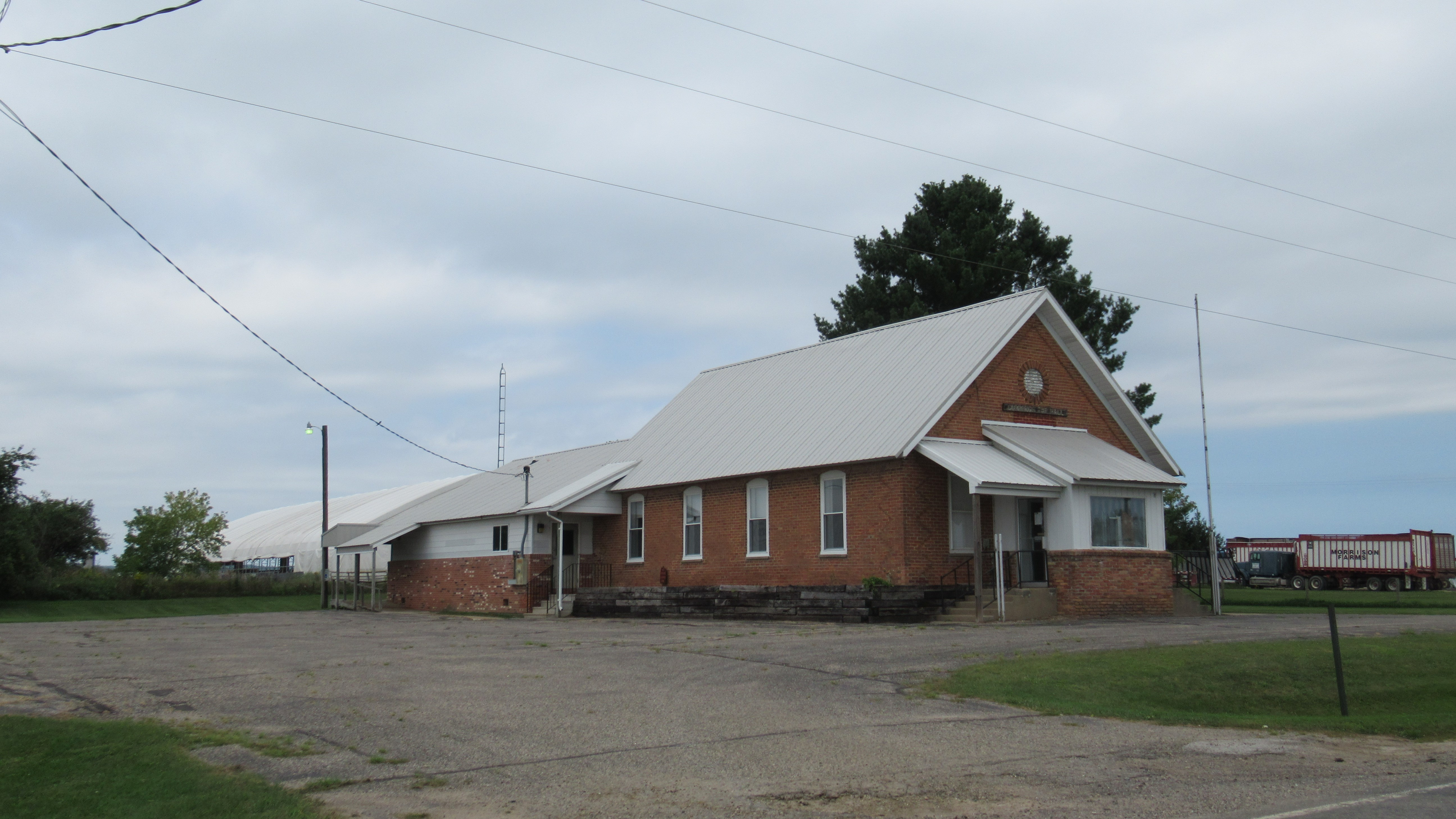
- Cumming Township Hall

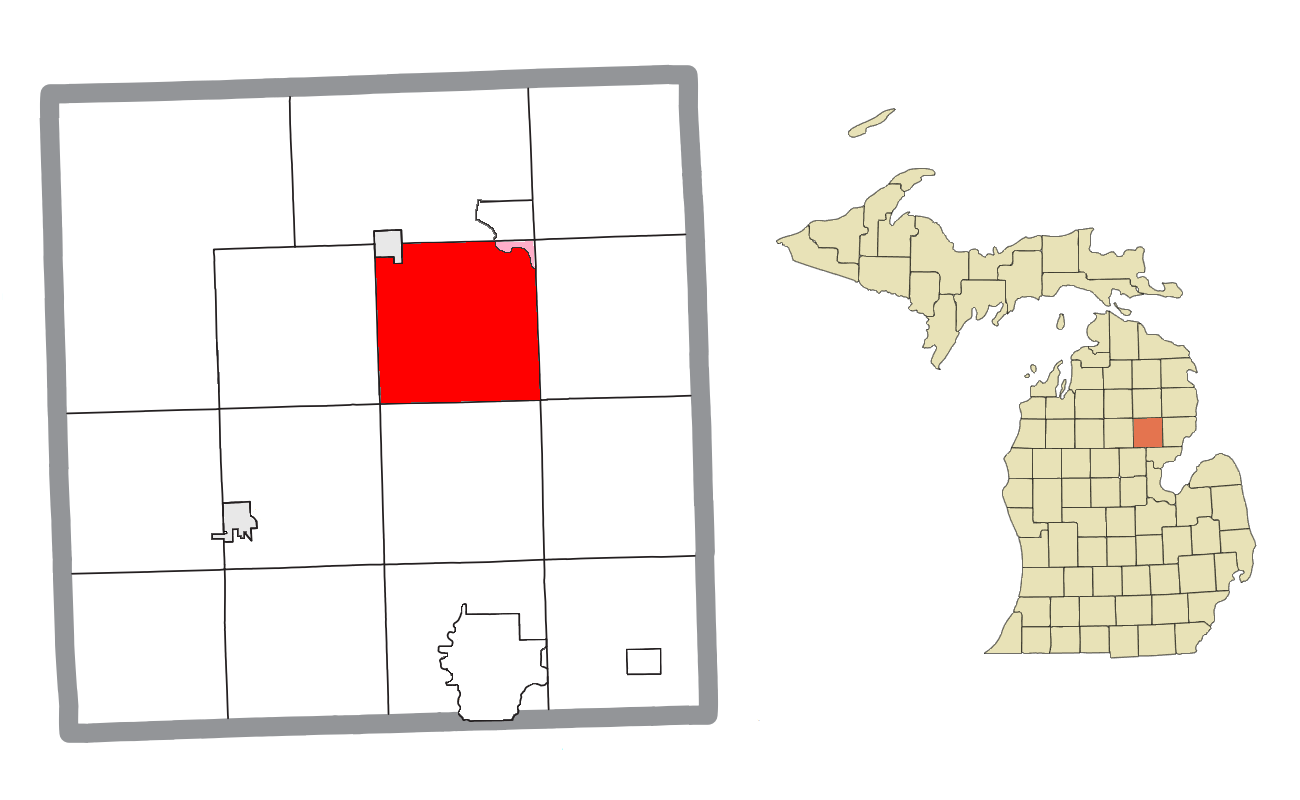
- Location within Ogemaw County (red) and an administered portion of the Lupton CDP (pink)

- Location within the state of Michigan Location within the United States
- Coordinates: 44°23′32″N 84°03′51″W
- Country: United States
- State: Michigan
- County: Ogemaw

Government
  - Supervisor: Ronald Quackenbush
  - Clerk: Robert Barber

Area
  - Total: 35.37 sq mi (91.61 km^{2})
  - Land: 34.49 sq mi (89.33 km^{2})
  - Water: 0.88 sq mi (2.28 km^{2})
- Elevation: 883 ft (269 m)

Population (2020)
  - Total: 717
  - Density: 20.8/sq mi (8.03/km^{2})
- Time zone: UTC-5 (Eastern (EST))
  - Summer (DST): UTC-4 (EDT)
- ZIP code(s): 48635 (Lupton); 48654 (Rose City); 48661 (West Branch)
- Area code: 989
- FIPS code: 26-19260
- GNIS feature ID: 1626149
- Website: https://cummingtwp.org/

Cumming Township is a civil township of Ogemaw County in the U.S. state of Michigan. The population was 717 at the 2020 census.

== Communities ==
- Camp Lu Lay Lea is an unincorporated community in the southeast corner of the township along Henderson Lake at 44°20′13″N 84°00′29″W.
- Fayettes Corner is an unincorporated community in the northwest portion of the township near Rose City.
- Lupton is an unincorporated community and census-designated place located along the northeastern edge of the township. Only a very small portion of Lupton is within Cumming Township, while the majority of the community is in Rose Township to the north.

== Geography ==
According to the U.S. Census Bureau, the township has a total area of 35.37 square miles (91.61 km^{2}), of which 34.49 square miles (89.33 km^{2}) is land and 0.88 square miles (2.28 km^{2}) (2.47%) is water.

=== Lakes ===
The township includes all or portions of the following lakes:

- Cummings Lake
- Devils Washbasin
- Devoe Lake
- Eagle Lake (also known as Houghton Lake)
- Grebe Lake
- Grousehaven Lake
- Henderson Lake
- Jewett Lake
- Lodge Lake
- Lost Lake
- Mallard Pond
- Pintail Pond
- South Pond
- Scaup Lake

=== Rivers ===
Most of the township is within the Rifle River drainage basin and the township includes all or portions of the following streams:

- Ammond Creek
- Bailor Creek
- Clear Creek
- Gamble Creek
- Houghton Creek
- Mayhue Creek
- Oyster Creek
- Prior Creek
- Rifle River
- Skunk Creek
- Vaughn Creek
- Wilkins Creek

== Demographics ==
Historical population
Census	Pop.	Note	%±
2000	796		—
2010	698		−12.3%
2020	717		2.7%
U.S. Decennial Census

As of the census of 2000, there were 796 people, 303 households, and 226 families residing in the township. The population density was 23.0 inhabitants per square mile (8.9/km^{2}). There were 530 housing units at an average density of 15.3 per square mile (5.9/km^{2}). The racial makeup of the township was 98.74% White, 0.13% African American, 0.13% Native American, and 1.01% from two or more races. Hispanic or Latino of any race were 0.63% of the population.

There were 303 households, out of which 32.3% had children under the age of 18 living with them, 64.7% were married couples living together, 6.6% had a female householder with no husband present, and 25.1% were non-families. 20.8% of all households were made up of individuals, and 10.9% had someone living alone who was 65 years of age or older. The average household size was 2.63 and the average family size was 3.06.

In the township the population was spread out, with 27.6% under the age of 18, 6.4% from 18 to 24, 25.9% from 25 to 44, 23.6% from 45 to 64, and 16.5% who were 65 years of age or older. The median age was 40 years. For every 100 females, there were 104.1 males. For every 100 females age 18 and over, there were 105.7 males.

The median income for a household in the township was $32,143, and the median income for a family was $38,594. Males had a median income of $33,229 versus $21,094 for females. The per capita income for the township was $15,971. About 10.1% of families and 14.8% of the population were below the poverty line, including 24.0% of those under age 18 and 13.3% of those age 65 or over.
