= Second Arenac County Courthouse =

- U.S. National Register of Historic Places
- Michigan State Historic Site
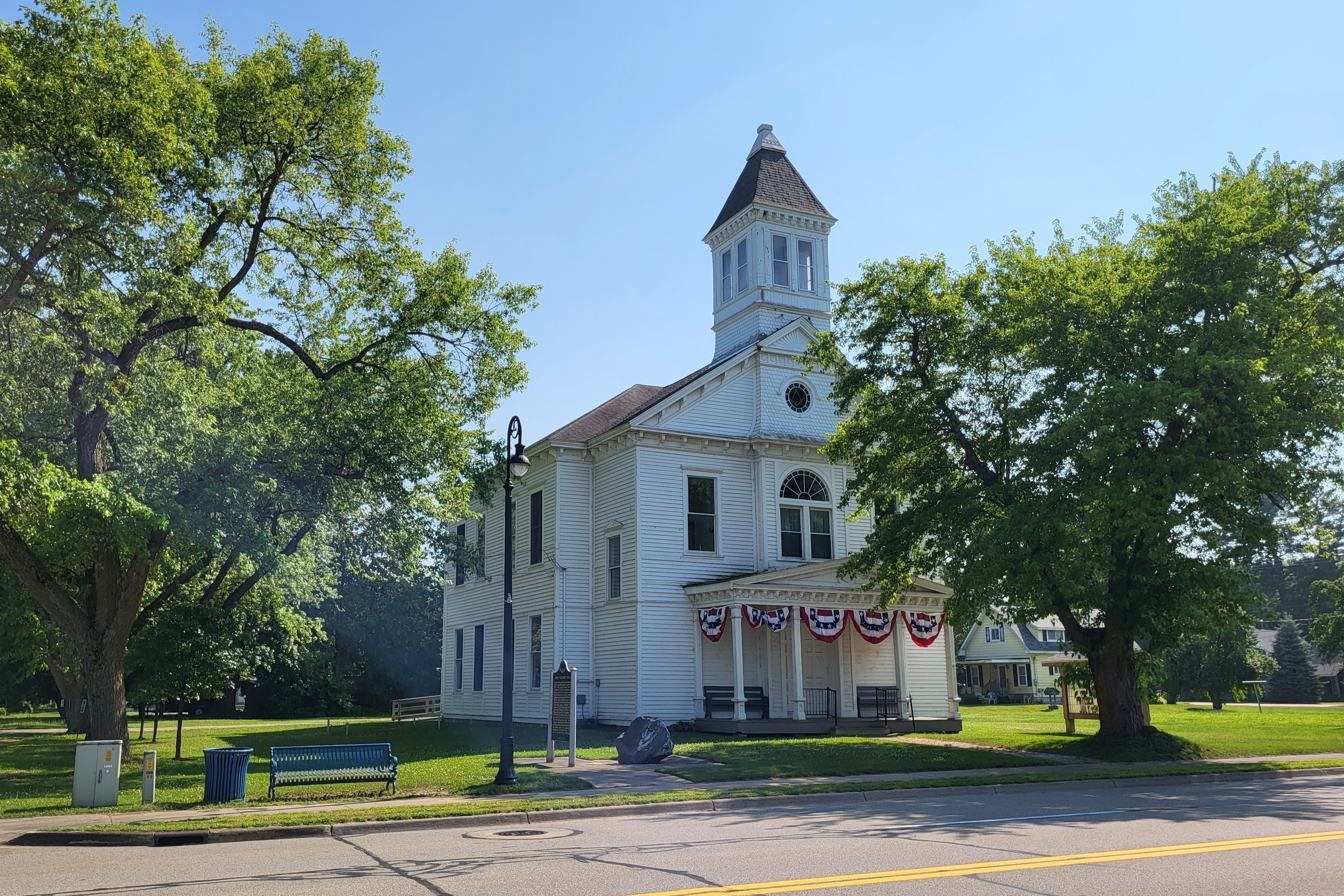

- Location within Michigan Location within the United States
- Interactive map
- Location: Central Ave., Omer, Michigan
- Coordinates: 44°2′50″N 83°51′14″W
- Area: 1 acre (0.40 ha)
- Built: 1889
- Built by: Angus McDonnell
- NRHP reference No.: 82002823

Significant dates
- Added to NRHP: April 15, 1982
- Designated MSHS: March 2, 1976

The Second Arenac County Courthouse, also known as Ye Olde Courthouse Masonic Hall and the Omer Masonic Hall, is a historic building located on Central Avenue in Omer, Michigan. The building is an outstanding example of a highly detailed vernacular frame building. It was designated a Michigan State Historic Site in 1976 and listed on the National Register of Historic Places in 1982.

== History ==
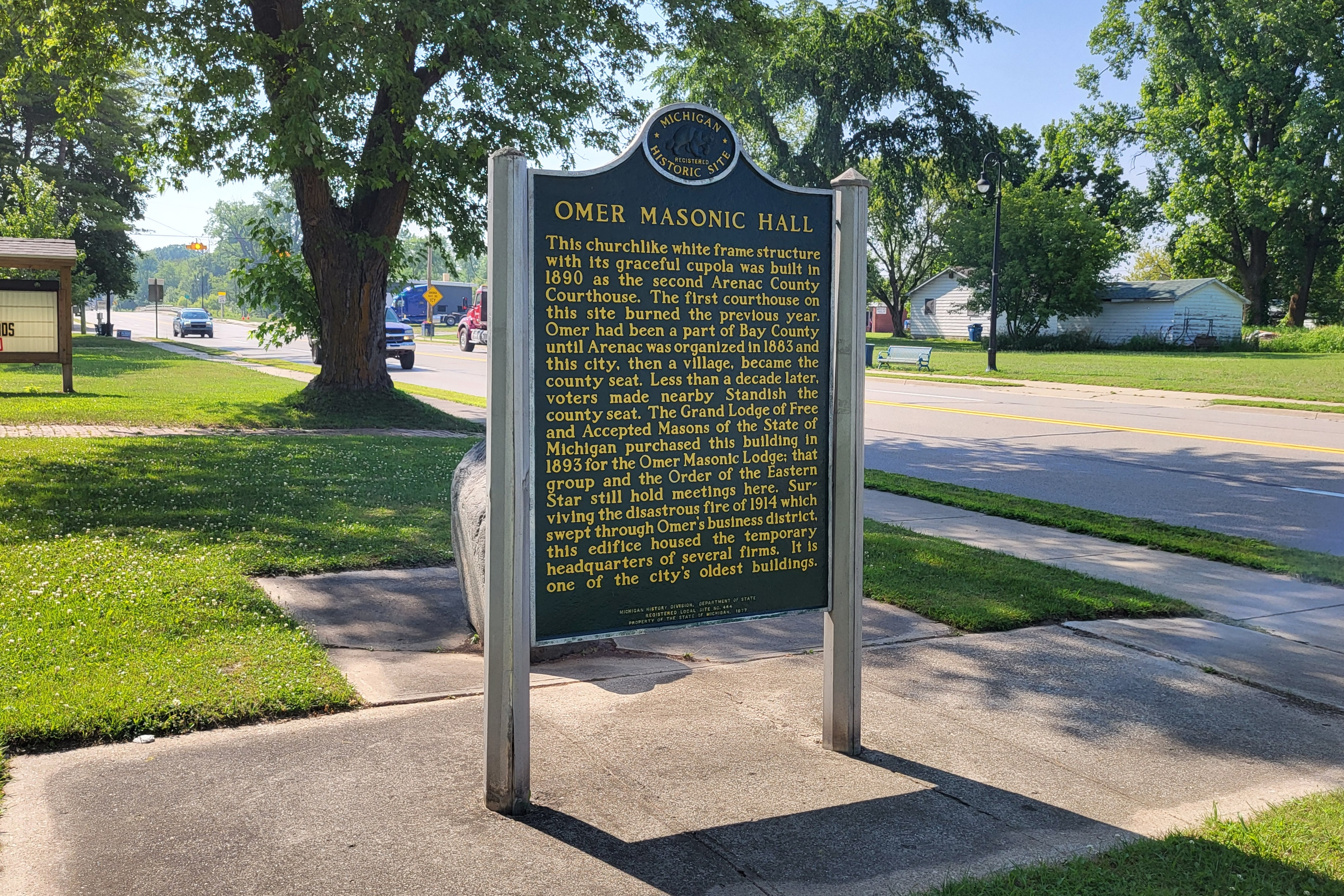
Omer Masonic Hall state historic marker

Arenac County was organized in 1883 from sections that had been part Bay County. Omer was selected as the county seat and a courthouse was built- In 1889 the courthouse burned down, and the county hired local contractor and sawmill owner Angus McDonnell to construct this building on the same site. The building was finished in 1890 at a cost of $2970.75. In 1891, a county-wide vote selected Standish as the county seat, and the county government was moved. In 1893, the vacated court building was sold to the Omer Lodge of the Free and Acceptable Order of Masons for $500. At various times, the Masonic Lodge allowed the village to use the structure as a village hall, fire station, and jail.

Facing heavy repair costs, the Masons moved out of the building for smaller quarters in 1997. The structure was purchased by Carol and Robert Britt, who completed some repairs and restoration work with the intention of converting the structure into a museum. In 2004, the Britts then sold the building to the Arenac County Historical Society. The building currently serves as the Society's Historical Courthouse Museum, known as "Ye Olde Courthouse Masonic Hall".

== Description ==
The Second Arenac County Courthouse is a rectangular symmetric two-story frame structure covered with clapboard with a hip roof. The entrance is through a porch supported with slender columns with a slightly projecting bay. An elaborate fanlight window sits above the entrance, and gable above features fishscale shingles and sunburst carving. A graceful cupola tops the structure.
