= Omer, Michigan =

- City
- City of Omer
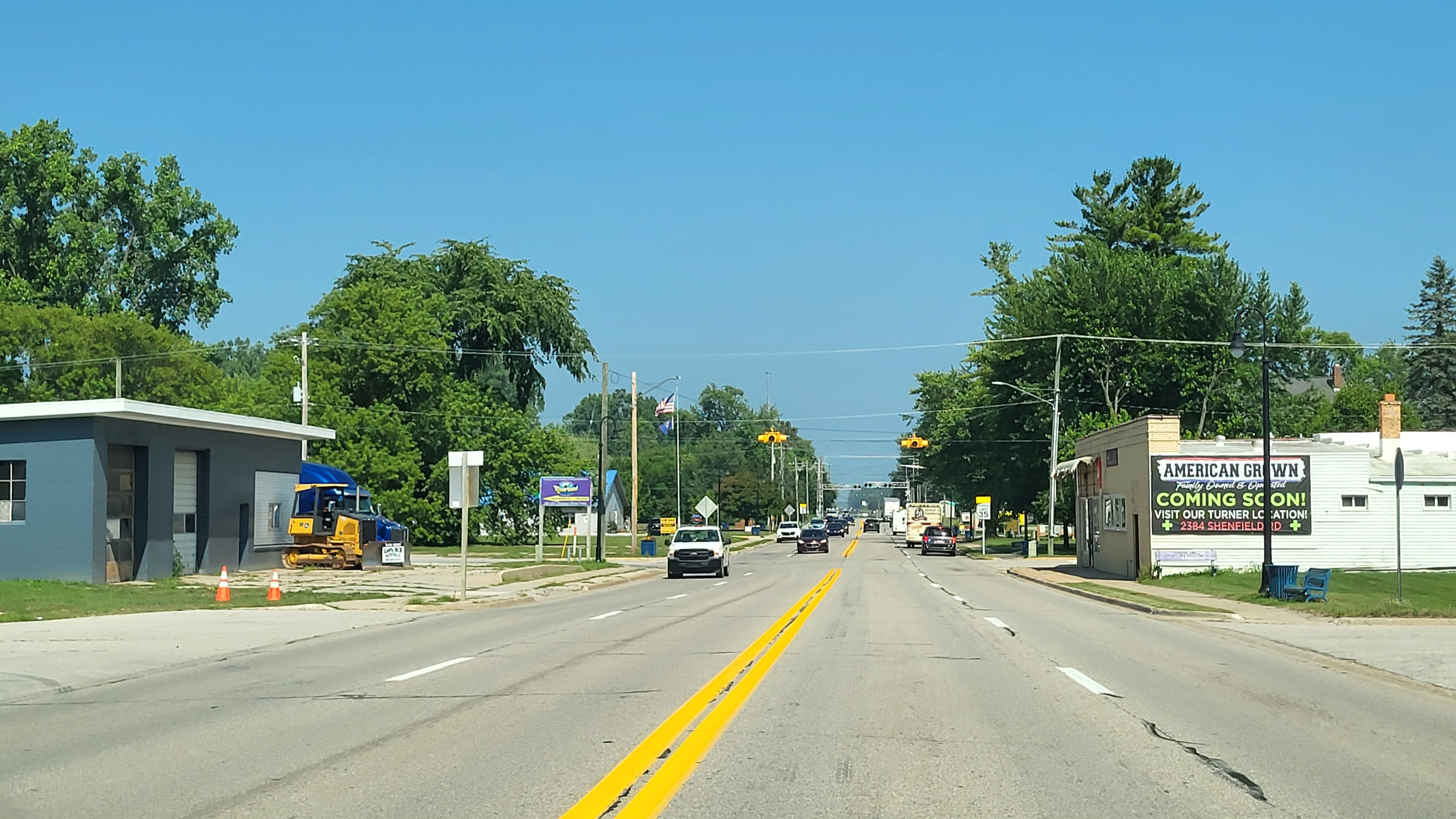
- Looking east along US 23 toward Main Street

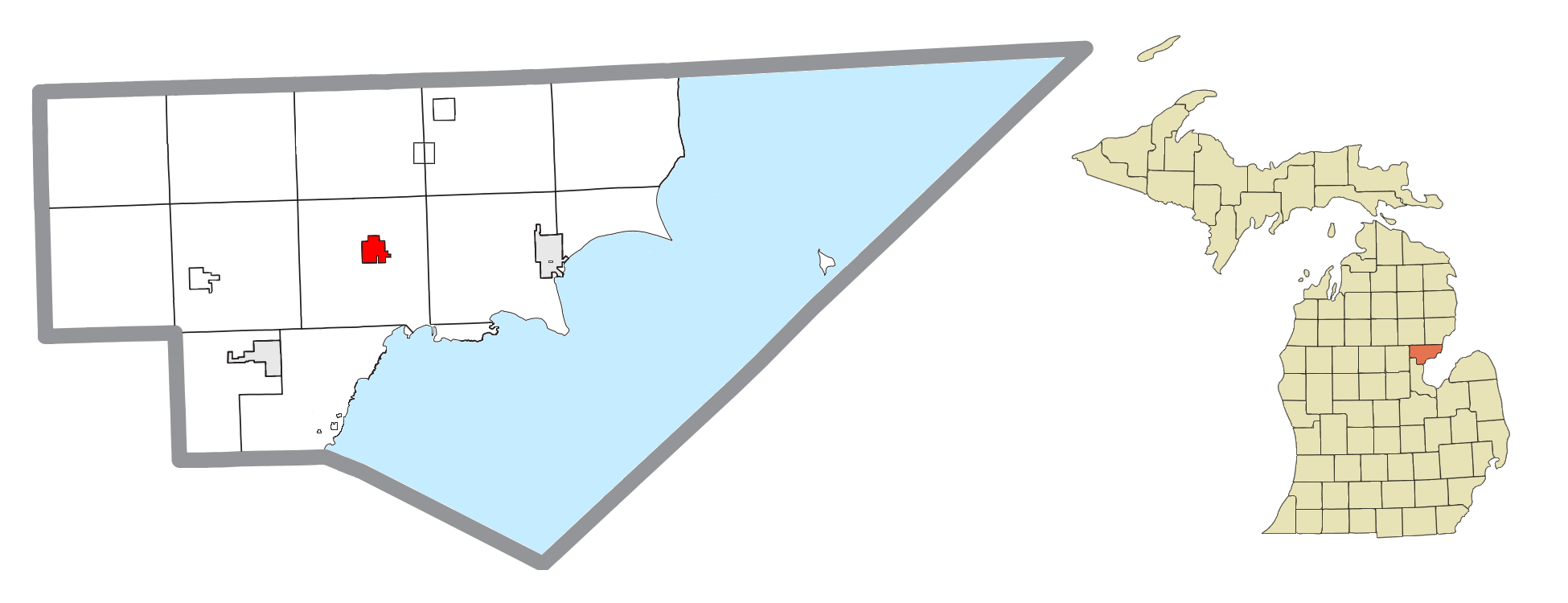
- Location within Arenac County

- Location within the state of Michigan Location within the United States
- Coordinates: 44°02′51″N 83°51′16″W
- Country: United States
- State: Michigan
- County: Arenac
- Settled: 1866
- Incorporated: 1903

Government
  - Type: Council–manager
  - Mayor: Lawrence Lee
  - Clerk: Susan Hegenauer

Area
  - Total: 1.16 sq mi (3.00 km^{2})
  - Land: 1.13 sq mi (2.93 km^{2})
  - Water: 0.027 sq mi (0.07 km^{2})
- Elevation: 610 ft (186 m)

Population (2020)
  - Total: 274
  - Density: 242.0/sq mi (93.42/km^{2})
- Time zone: UTC-5 (Eastern (EST))
  - Summer (DST): UTC-4 (EDT)
- ZIP code(s): 48749
- Area code: 989
- FIPS code: 26-60660
- GNIS feature ID: 0634057
- Website: https://www.cityofomer.com/

Omer is a city in Arenac County in the U.S. state of Michigan. The population was 274 at the 2020 census, which ranks it as the least-populated city in the state.

Omer is consistently ranked as "Michigan's Smallest City" in terms of population, although the city of Lake Angelus held this distinction when it recorded a lower population at the 2010 census. Lake Angelus recorded a higher population of 287 at the 2020 census, making Omer again the state's least-populated city.

== History ==
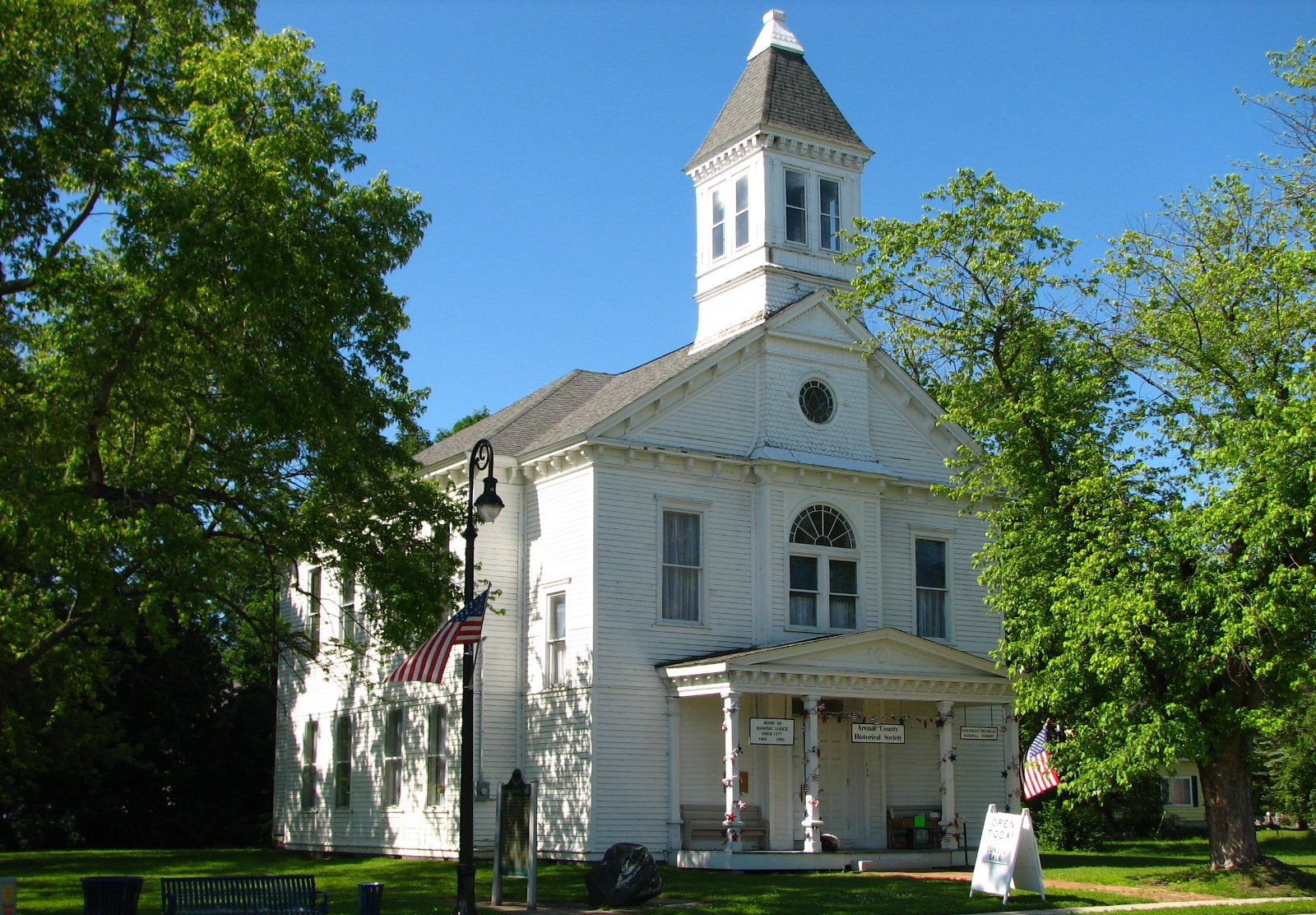
The Second Arenac County Courthouse is listed on the National Register of Historic Places and is now home to the Arenac County Historical Society.

Omer was founded by George Gorie and George Carscallen, who set up a sawmill along the Rifle River in 1866. The town was originally named Rifle River Mills, but Carscallen, the first postmaster, wanted to rename the town Homer. However, he found a post office in another town called Homer, Michigan and simply dropped the leading H, producing the final name. The community received a station on the Detroit and Mackinaw Railroad, while in 1872 the area was platted. In 1883, Omer was split off from Bay County into the newly formed Arenac County.

Omer was incorporated as a city in 1903. A fire in 1914 almost eliminated the city, destroying 40 buildings and ending the early thrive that Omer had. Two years later, a flood curtailed rebuilding efforts by washing out the local dam.

Omer is the location of the story of the "cussing canoeist", the man who received a ticket under a century-old law for shouting a long stream of expletives in the presence of a woman and her two young children after he fell out of a canoe on the Rifle River. The American Civil Liberties Union intervened on the canoeist's behalf and got the law struck down in court.

A second news story of note concerned the successful secession of two households from the city because the City of Omer was charging them a water tax while refusing to deliver water service to their property.

== Geography ==
According to the United States Census Bureau, the city has a total area of 1.16 square miles (3.00 km^{2}) of which 1.13 square miles (2.93 km^{2}) is land and 0.03 square miles (0.08 km^{2}) (2.59%) is water.

The Rifle River runs through the city, which is a prominent fishing location for sucker fish in the spring. An annual festival and fishing tournament are held in Omer.

=== Major highways ===
- US 23 runs west–east through the city.

== Demographics ==
Historical population
Census	Pop.	Note	%±
1910	367		—
1920	266		−27.5%
1930	216		−18.8%
1940	295		36.6%
1950	321		8.8%
1960	322		0.3%
1970	366		13.7%
1980	403		10.1%
1990	385		−4.5%
2000	337		−12.5%
2010	313		−7.1%
2020	274		−12.5%
U.S. Decennial Census

=== 2010 census ===
As of the census of 2010, there were 313 people, 131 households, and 82 families residing in the city. The population density was 277.0 inhabitants per square mile (107.0/km^{2}). There were 162 housing units at an average density of 143.4 per square mile (55.4/km^{2}). The racial makeup of the city was 94.2% White, 0.3% African American, 4.2% Native American, 0.3% from other races, and 1.0% from two or more races.

There were 131 households, of which 32.1% had children under the age of 18 living with them, 41.2% were married couples living together, 13.0% had a female householder with no husband present, 8.4% had a male householder with no wife present, and 37.4% were non-families. 28.2% of all households were made up of individuals, and 13.7% had someone living alone who was 65 years of age or older. The average household size was 2.39 and the average family size was 2.84.

The median age in the city was 40.8 years. 22.4% of residents were under the age of 18; 8.6% were between the ages of 18 and 24; 25% were from 25 to 44; 26.2% were from 45 to 64; and 17.9% were 65 years of age or older. The gender makeup of the city was 50.2% male and 49.8% female.

=== 2000 census ===
As of the census of 2000, there were 337 people, 143 households, and 98 families residing in the city. The population density was 272.2 inhabitants per square mile (105.1/km^{2}). There were 163 housing units at an average density of 131.7 per square mile (50.8/km^{2}). The racial makeup of the city was 95.85% White, 1.19% Native American, 0.59% from other races, and 2.37% from two or more races. Hispanic or Latino of any race were 1.78% of the population.

There were 143 households, out of which 26.6% had children under the age of 18 living with them, 54.5% were married couples living together, 10.5% had a female householder with no husband present, and 30.8% were non-families. 24.5% of all households were made up of individuals, and 13.3% had someone living alone who was 65 years of age or older. The average household size was 2.36 and the average family size was 2.82.

In the city, the population was spread out, with 22.6% under the age of 18, 7.1% from 18 to 24, 26.1% from 25 to 44, 25.2% from 45 to 64, and 19.0% who were 65 years of age or older. The median age was 40 years. For every 100 females, there were 97.1 males. For every 100 females age 18 and over, there were 96.2 males.

The median income for a household in the city was $28,125, and the median income for a family was $33,250. Males had a median income of $26,607 versus $21,250 for females. The per capita income for the city was $16,755. About 12.4% of families and 15.2% of the population were below the poverty line, including 15.8% of those under age 18 and 16.7% of those age 65 or over.
