= Rose Township =

Rose Township may refer to:

- Rose Township, Shelby County, Illinois
- Rose Township, Oakland County, Michigan
- Rose Township, Ogemaw County, Michigan
- Rose Township, Stutsman County, North Dakota, in Stutsman County, North Dakota
- Rose Township, Carroll County, Ohio
- Rose Township, Jefferson County, Pennsylvania
- Rose Township, Lyman County, South Dakota, in Lyman County, South Dakota
