= Rifle River =

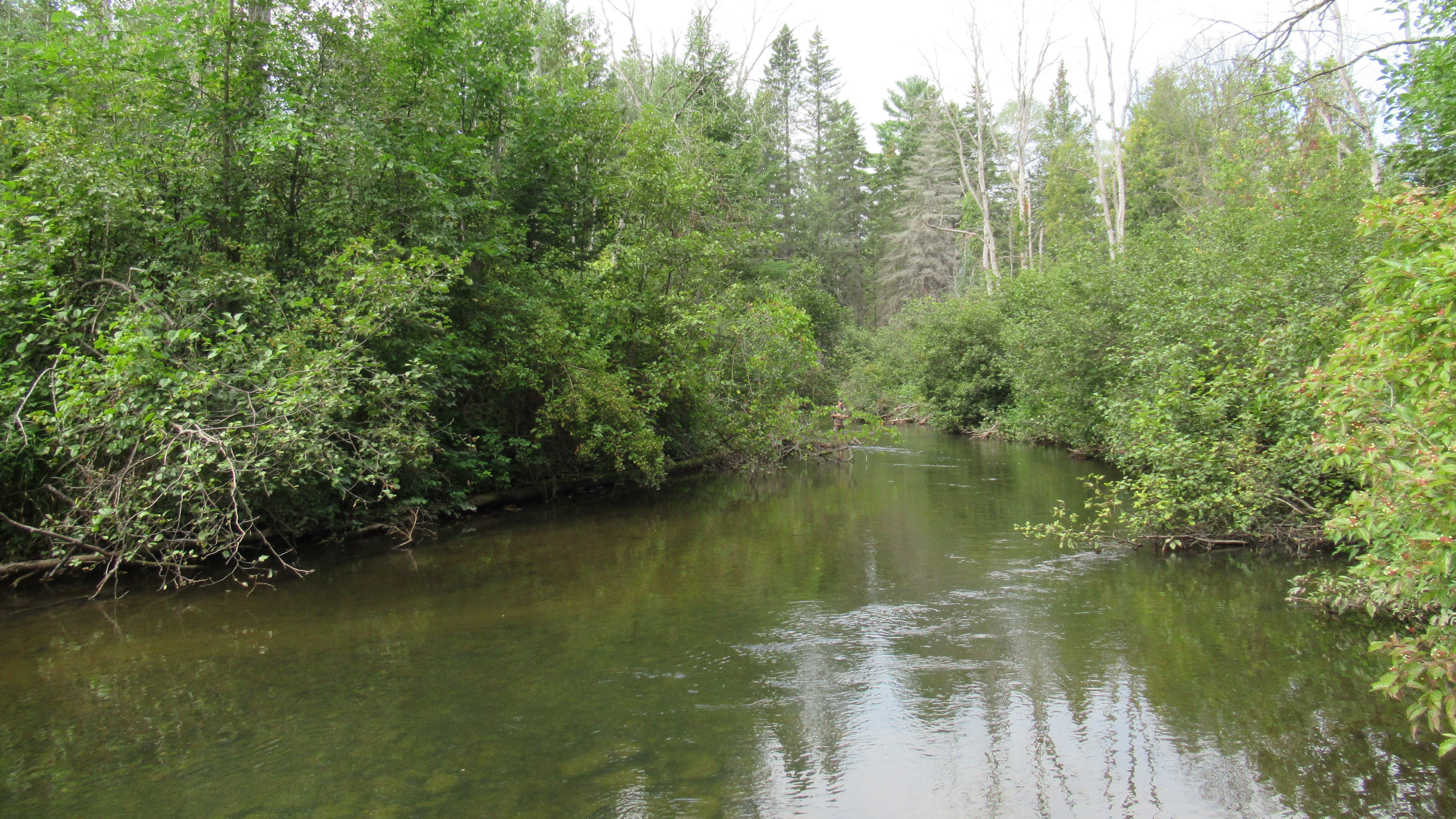
- View from Sage Lake Road in Cumming Township

- River mouth location within the state of Michigan

Location
- Country: United States
- State: Michigan
- Counties: Ogemaw, Arenac
- Cities: Selkirk, Omer

Physical characteristics
- Source
  - location: Ogemaw County
  - coordinates: 44°23′58″N 84°01′57″W
- Mouth: Saginaw Bay
  - location: Arenac County
  - coordinates: 43°59′34″N 83°49′15″W
  - elevation: 577 ft (176 m)
- Length: 60 mi (97 km)
- Basin size: 385 sq mi (1,000 km^{2})
- Discharge
  - location: Saginaw Bay
  - average: 181 cu ft/s (5.1 m^{3}/s)

Rifle River is a 60.3-mile-long (97.0 km) river in the U.S. state of Michigan. It rises in northeastern Ogemaw County and flows through Arenac County to enter Saginaw Bay of Lake Huron. Once a logging river during the Michigan forestry boom at the turn of the 20th century, the river is now primarily used for recreation, and is a state-designated natural river. It is a popular river for canoeing, with no portages or dams and an average depth of 18 inches, to 5 feet in downtown Omer. It is also known for having one of the best White Sucker (Catostomus commersonii) runs in the state of Michigan, in the spring.

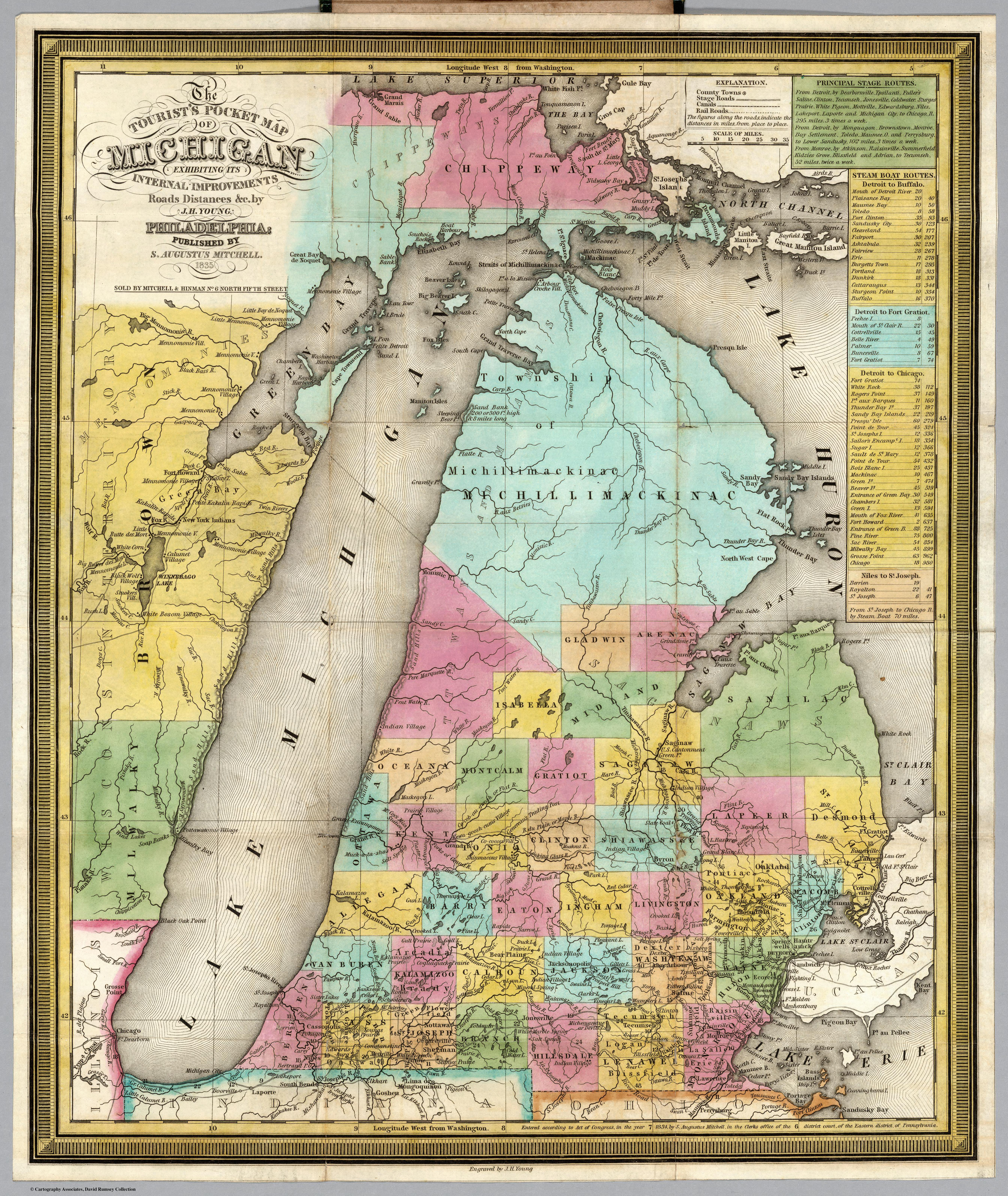
According to a historical map of Michigan originally published in 1831, the Rifle River may have previously been referred to as Grindstone Creek.

== Canoe liveries serving the Rifle River ==
Several private canoe operators provide equipment rental and transportation for river trips along the Rifle River.

Twining, Michigan

- Whispering Pines Campground and Canoe Livery.

Sterling, Michigan (Central portion of the Rifle River - Most Popular)

- Rifle River Campground & Canoe Livery
- River View Campground & Canoe Livery
- Whites Campground & Canoe Livery

Omer, Michigan (Lower portion of the Rifle River)

- Big Bend Campground & Canoe Rental
- Riverbend Campground & Canoe Rental
- Russell's Canoe Livery

== See also ==
- Rifle River Recreation Area
