= Rose Township, Ogemaw County, Michigan =

Rose Township, Michigan
- Civil township
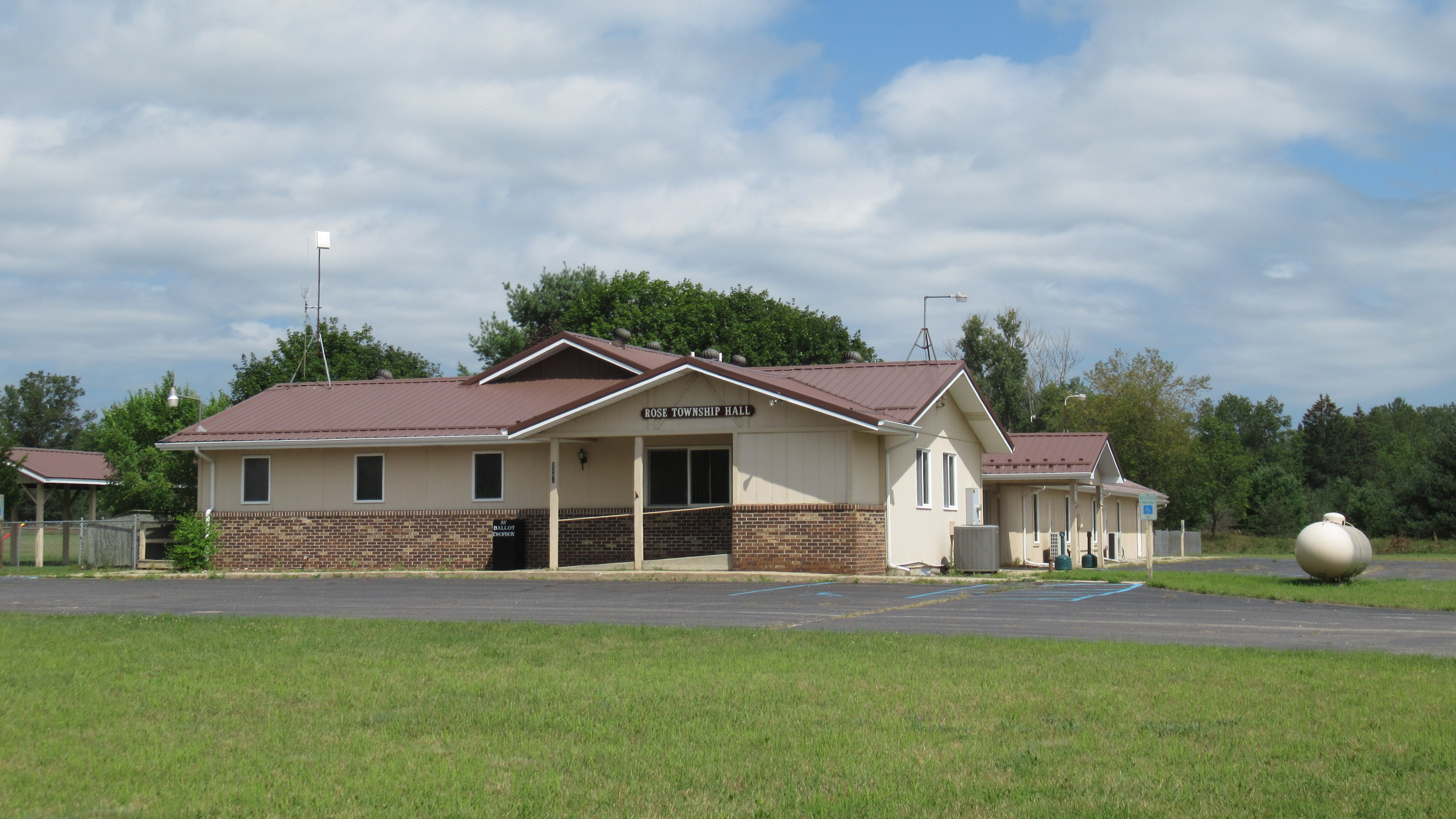
- Rose Township Hall in Lupton

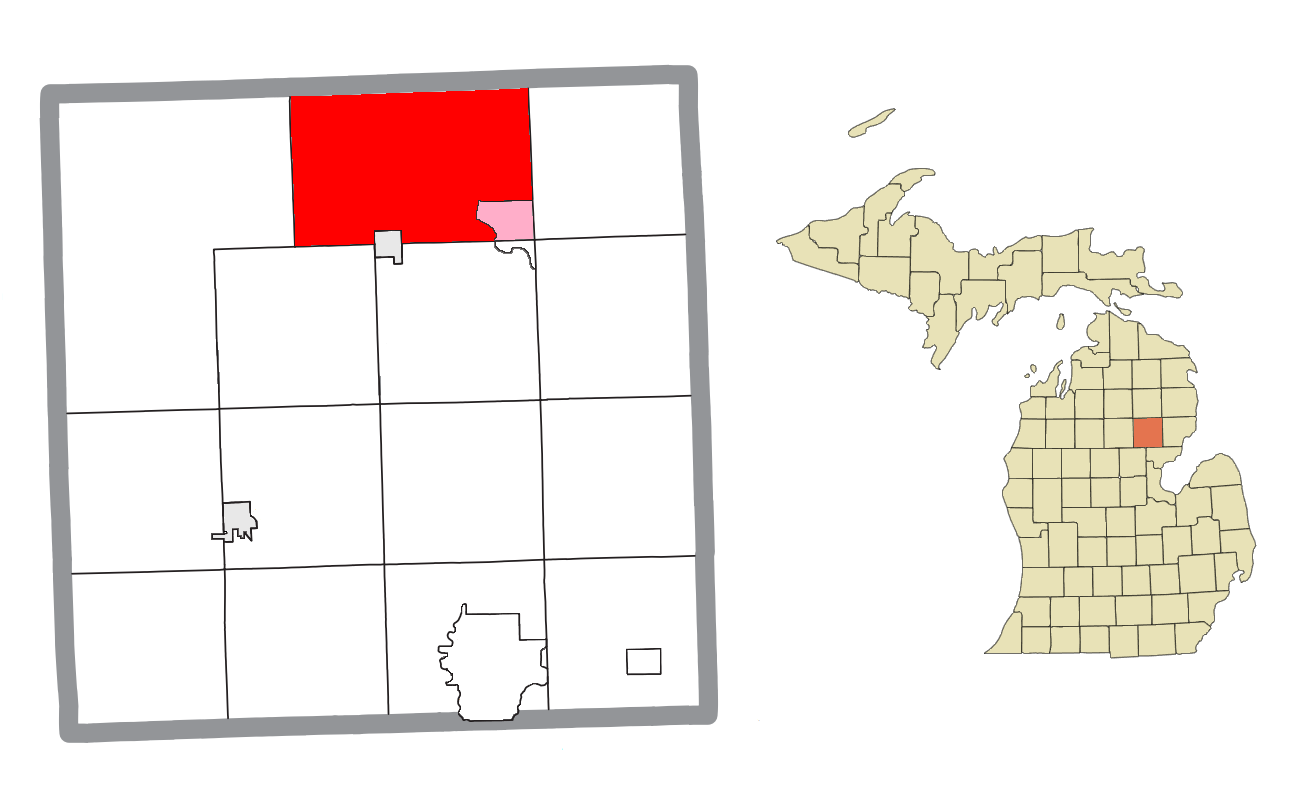
- Location within Ogemaw County (red) and an administered portion of the Lupton CDP (pink)

- Location within the state of Michigan Location within the United States
- Coordinates: 44°26′19″N 84°6′34″W
- Country: United States
- State: Michigan
- County: Ogemaw

Government
  - Supervisor: Aaron Gemmill
  - Clerk: Kelli Collins

Area
  - Total: 53.11 sq mi (137.55 km^{2})
  - Land: 52.86 sq mi (136.91 km^{2})
  - Water: 0.25 sq mi (0.65 km^{2})
- Elevation: 1,201 ft (366 m)

Population (2020)
  - Total: 1,241
  - Density: 23.48/sq mi (9.064/km^{2})
- Time zone: UTC-5 (Eastern (EST))
  - Summer (DST): UTC-4 (EDT)
- ZIP code(s): 48635 (Lupton); 48654 (Rose City)
- Area code: 989
- FIPS code: 26-69600
- GNIS feature ID: 1627005
- Website: Official website

Rose Township is a civil township of Ogemaw County in the U.S. state of Michigan. The population was 1,241 at the 2020 census.

== Communities ==
- Lupton is an unincorporated community and census-designated place located in the southeastern portion of the township. Most of Lupton is within Rose Township, while a small portion extends into Cumming Township to the south.

== Geography ==
According to the U.S. Census Bureau, the township has a total area of 53.11 square miles (137.55 km^{2}), of which 52.86 square miles (136.91 km^{2}) is land and 0.25 square miles (0.65 km^{2}) (0.47%) is water.

== Demographics ==
As of the census of 2000, there were 1,409 people, 558 households, and 402 families residing in the township. The population density was 26.7 inhabitants per square mile (10.3/km^{2}). There were 1,065 housing units at an average density of 20.1 per square mile (7.8/km^{2}). The racial makeup of the township was 98.37% White, 0.07% African American, 0.21% Native American, 0.14% Asian, 0.07% Pacific Islander, 0.28% from other races, and 0.85% from two or more races. Hispanic or Latino of any race were 1.70% of the population.

There were 558 households, out of which 27.6% had children under the age of 18 living with them, 61.8% were married couples living together, 6.5% had a female householder with no husband present, and 27.8% were non-families. 24.6% of all households were made up of individuals, and 11.1% had someone living alone who was 65 years of age or older. The average household size was 2.51 and the average family size was 2.97.

In the township the population was spread out, with 24.3% under the age of 18, 6.8% from 18 to 24, 22.4% from 25 to 44, 30.2% from 45 to 64, and 16.2% who were 65 years of age or older. The median age was 42 years. For every 100 females, there were 101.3 males. For every 100 females age 18 and over, there were 101.1 males.

The median income for a household in the township was $30,625, and the median income for a family was $33,472. Males had a median income of $29,028 versus $20,156 for females. The per capita income for the township was $17,168. About 8.7% of families and 11.8% of the population were below the poverty line, including 15.1% of those under age 18 and 10.9% of those age 65 or over.
